= List of countries by past and projected GDP (nominal) per capita =

This is an alphabetical list of countries by past and projected gross domestic product per capita, based on official exchange rates, not on the purchasing power parity (PPP) methodology. Values are given in USDs and have not been adjusted for inflation. These figures have been taken from the International Monetary Fund's World Economic Outlook (WEO) Database October 2026 edition), World Bank, or various sources.

== IMF estimates ==
=== 1980s ===
IMF estimates (1980s)
Country / territory	1980	1981	1982	1983	1984	1985	1986	1987	1988	1989
Afghanistan										
Albania	728	818	825	816	788	789	856	832	805	861
Algeria	2,462	2,502	2,447	2,514	2,640	2,989	2,929	2,936	2,327	2,309
Andorra										
Angola	1,074	978	953	968	1,000	1,093	995	1,109	1,171	1,326
Antigua and Barbuda	1,935	2,200	2,479	2,794	3,260	3,849	4,731	5,612	6,757	7,545
Argentina	8,361	6,671	3,258	3,963	4,375	3,249	3,857	3,910	4,524	2,867
Armenia										
Aruba										
Australia	11,021	12,544	12,250	11,606	12,591	10,981	11,259	13,015	16,266	18,232
Austria	10,673	9,230	9,217	9,366	8,834	9,041	12,816	16,005	17,536	17,452
Azerbaijan										
Bahamas	12,292	12,496	13,749	14,962	15,630	16,801	17,854	19,330	19,688	21,819
Bahrain	10,623	11,531	11,699	11,590	11,638	10,615	8,023	8,391	10,011	10,079
Bangladesh	311	322	294	277	303	318	318	339	356	378
Barbados	4,391	4,816	5,017	5,312	5,775	6,027	6,596	7,239	7,672	8,461
Belarus										
Belgium	12,529	10,366	9,129	8,626	8,245	8,569	11,874	14,741	16,009	16,098
Belize	1,524	1,584	1,554	1,593	1,731	1,670	1,768	2,015	2,335	2,623
Benin	597	390	375	321	332	349	436	504	513	463
Bhutan	311	326	335	353	357	359	393	460	511	497
Bolivia	690	611	663	615	626	664	636	678	707	710
Bosnia and Herzegovina										
Botswana	1,256	1,088	1,107	1,180	1,130	1,015	1,327	2,005	2,512	2,706
Brazil	1,230	1,383	1,446	1,135	1,106	1,720	1,955	2,087	2,289	3,088
Brunei						21,771	14,544	16,561	15,281	16,683
Bulgaria	4,286	4,609	4,794	4,914	5,211	4,458	3,947	4,581	7,507	7,679
Burkina Faso	338	287	261	233	203	218	278	315	339	330
Burundi	276	279	286	294	260	294	301	275	251	253
Cape Verde	569	669	522	494	494	542	685	836	997	1,007
Cambodia							29	19	37	45
Cameroon	1,045	1,151	1,073	1,053	1,084	1,103	1,399	1,575	1,554	1,345
Canada	11,281	12,397	12,544	13,493	13,947	14,186	14,540	16,408	19,041	20,842
Central African Republic	637	644	607	569	540	692	877	958	1,018	1,056
Chad	212	246	232	227	237	250	299	329	372	340
Chile	2,598	3,026	2,220	1,775	1,699	1,434	1,515	1,756	2,035	2,306
China	311	290	280	296	301	293	280	300	368	406
Colombia	1,682	1,793	1,879	1,828	1,768	1,624	1,593	1,624	1,715	1,694
Comoros	722	617	571	542	517	511	669	789	824	783
Democratic Republic of the Congo	2,731	2,301	2,422	1,891	1,222	1,081	1,174	1,076	1,207	1,189
Republic of the Congo	1,268	1,009	853	752	671	668	886	1,044	1,077	1,071
Costa Rica	2,109	1,111	1,072	1,257	1,421	1,478	1,611	1,613	1,598	1,763
Ivory Coast	1,765	1,430	1,235	1,061	1,029	1,010	1,301	1,378	1,380	1,269
Croatia										
Cyprus	4,550	4,352	4,453	4,399	4,576	4,825	6,058	7,188	8,204	8,636
Czech Republic										
Denmark	13,825	11,995	11,737	11,792	11,516	12,219	17,151	21,305	22,526	21,894
Djibouti										
Dominica		1,113	1,218	1,347	1,495	1,643	1,865	2,103	2,378	2,582
Dominican Republic	1,534	1,677	1,545	1,562	2,398	1,023	1,212	1,245	1,114	1,231
Ecuador	2,015	2,006	1,947	1,665	1,725	1,964	1,405	1,280	1,186	1,136
Egypt	580	618	711	846	926	1,049	1,132	1,585	1,858	2,266
El Salvador	802	699	685	652	474	457	456	458	527	593
Equatorial Guinea	123	110	121	126	130	206	241	284	297	253
Eritrea										
Estonia										
Eswatini	1,227	1,256	1,087	1,082	895	683	839	1,056	1,197	1,166
Ethiopia	228	228	233	251	230	261	262	272	272	277
Fiji	2,056	2,062	1,942	1,781	1,829	1,744	1,954	1,777	1,672	1,747
Finland	11,258	10,990	11,037	10,545	10,890	11,489	14,998	18,632	22,123	24,041
France	12,624	11,058	10,433	9,922	9,357	9,753	13,488	16,241	17,650	17,639
Gabon	6,094	5,377	4,931	4,619	4,346	4,478	5,735	4,246	4,581	4,899
Gambia	904	815	741	717	496	579	434	559	623	629
Georgia										
Germany	11,150	9,364	9,048	9,058	8,569	8,711	12,432	15,468	16,575	16,292
Ghana	3,239	5,006	5,612	3,786	1,346	1,169	1,080	888	927	914
Greece	5,866	5,347	5,546	4,980	4,827	4,765	5,592	6,486	7,526	7,770
Grenada	1,246	1,276	1,347	1,373	1,478	1,678	1,872	2,163	2,409	2,758
Guatemala	1,099	1,170	1,156	1,170	1,194	1,374	724	818	864	972
Guinea										
Guinea-Bissau	370	464	517	571	389	559	535	445	406	478
Guyana	1,102	1,056	905	922	861	924	1,054	982	1,126	1,146
Haiti	448	484	495	522	568	619	676	327	213	193
Honduras	1,075	1,062	1,086	1,106	1,177	1,226	1,281	1,356	1,462	1,627
Hong Kong	5,704	5,995	6,139	5,590	6,171	6,490	7,380	9,015	10,527	12,013
Hungary	2,159	2,214	2,257	2,053	1,996	2,030	2,346	2,591	2,848	2,919
Iceland	15,545	15,882	14,416	12,210	12,462	12,867	17,062	23,480	25,631	23,343
India	271	274	278	296	281	302	314	345	356	350
Indonesia	673	737	742	659	672	658	610	563	622	697
Iran	2,977	3,034	3,619	4,345	4,310	4,630	5,157	6,673	7,334	8,706
Iraq										
Ireland	6,254	5,888	6,080	5,842	5,594	5,936	7,996	9,422	10,369	10,758
Israel	6,368	6,699	7,053	7,702	7,199	6,574	7,969	9,365	11,411	11,414
Italy	8,512	7,707	7,610	7,892	7,797	8,049	11,397	14,306	15,846	16,469
Jamaica	1,246	1,345	1,518	1,323	973	901	1,062	1,189	1,408	1,630
Japan	9,893	10,828	10,006	10,899	11,467	12,083	17,856	21,632	26,089	25,852
Jordan	1,945	2,103	2,161	2,187	2,126	2,059	2,538	2,575	2,322	1,503
Kazakhstan										
Kenya	855	777	722	644	647	623	717	758	759	728
Kiribati	568	591	527	511	556	410	398	441	558	535
South Korea	1,745	1,918	2,032	2,246	2,469	2,543	2,911	3,658	4,889	5,989
Kosovo										
Kuwait										
Kyrgyzstan										
Laos	585	335	328	585	815	998	678	465	294	353
Latvia										
Lebanon	1,356	1,269	854	1,162	1,349	1,105	840	960	946	761
Lesotho	303	299	243	261	228	177	199	255	285	292
Liberia										
Libya	12,889	10,645	10,135	9,268	8,319	8,229	6,453	5,752	5,732	5,817
Liechtenstein										
Lithuania										
Luxembourg	17,667	15,190	12,464	12,235	11,984	12,394	17,950	22,150	24,876	26,227
Macau										
Madagascar	599	534	523	499	405	384	427	308	297	288
Malawi	460	448	416	420	400	359	354	328	355	384
Malaysia	1,927	1,920	2,006	2,190	2,420	2,154	1,864	2,070	2,214	2,381
Maldives	413	465	535	560	646	738	836	770	898	988
Mali	359	290	214	186	169	191	249	282	307	368
Malta										
Marshall Islands										
Mauritania										
Mauritius	1,285	1,203	1,140	1,196	1,095	1,100	1,474	1,852	2,133	2,175
Mexico	3,557	4,461	3,163	2,519	2,905	3,015	2,043	2,195	2,631	3,145
Federated States of Micronesia										
Moldova										
Mongolia										
Montenegro										
Morocco	1,225	969	954	842	752	742	957	1,031	1,193	1,200
Mozambique	397	301	300	264	270	354	414	187	165	172
Myanmar										
Namibia										1,766
Nauru										
Nepal	145	166	164	175	181	184	195	198	229	227
Netherlands	13,770	11,446	11,029	10,697	9,919	10,022	13,895	16,919	17,981	17,622
New Zealand	7,255	7,512	7,379	7,072	6,969	6,951	8,383	11,202	13,659	13,112
Nicaragua										
Niger	609	510	458	396	310	296	379	430	426	395
Nigeria										
North Macedonia										
Norway	15,682	15,435	15,149	14,856	14,923	15,679	18,792	22,370	24,048	24,149
Oman	5,358	6,020	6,317	6,148	6,324	7,026	5,214	5,145	5,001	5,279
Pakistan	479	550	584	530	560	545	544	553	621	631
Palau										
Panama	1,897	2,096	2,262	2,269	2,315	2,395	2,435	2,394	2,026	1,989
Papua New Guinea	1,381	1,319	1,223	1,195	1,080	976	1,040	1,160	1,565	1,455
Paraguay	1,344	1,664	1,693	1,824	1,439	1,194	1,386	1,129	1,453	1,024
Peru	1,151	1,356	1,316	999	1,006	851	1,248	2,016	1,560	1,885
Philippines	774	830	843	736	678	646	615	667	744	817
Poland	1,600	1,503	1,809	2,063	2,048	1,906	1,972	1,696	1,825	1,778
Portugal	3,339	3,297	3,095	2,839	2,596	2,717	3,775	4,724	5,533	5,978
Puerto Rico	4,507	4,941	5,147	5,257	5,777	6,059	6,495	6,987	7,579	8,094
Qatar	27,242	27,820	22,657	18,004	17,497	15,496	11,644	11,773	10,854	11,040
Romania	2,052	2,450	2,441	2,125	1,710	2,102	2,264	2,518	2,593	2,315
Russia										
Rwanda	293	321	330	339	317	365	399	428	443	447
Samoa										
San Marino										
São Tomé and Príncipe	751	901	848	775	787	811	1,106	1,076	894	864
Saudi Arabia	19,543	20,846	16,508	13,253	11,688	9,667	7,699	7,222	7,083	7,287
Senegal	768	678	645	560	530	563	773	902	866	828
Serbia										
Seychelles										
Sierra Leone	764	799	880	747	860	717	525	448	719	645
Singapore	5,005	5,672	6,000	6,718	7,160	6,788	6,871	7,795	9,329	10,726
Slovakia										
Slovenia										
Solomon Islands	940	963	927	843	819	724	627	641	709	675
Somalia										
South Africa	3,131	3,176	2,849	3,104	2,665	1,973	2,191	2,814	2,963	3,008
South Sudan										
Spain	6,119	5,374	5,164	4,495	4,465	4,688	6,468	8,175	9,584	10,550
Sri Lanka	334	343	365	390	452	443	470	485	502	498
Saint Kitts and Nevis	1,333	1,617	1,853	1,834	2,148	2,407	2,848	3,278	3,912	4,386
Saint Lucia	1,411	1,589	1,479	1,571	1,976	2,201	2,589	2,816	3,181	3,564
Saint Vincent and the Grenadines	903	1,110	1,227	1,309	1,435	1,537	1,686	1,828	2,078	2,211
Sudan	487	339	240	319	375	253	329	517	405	696
Suriname										
Sweden	16,849	15,371	13,559	12,446	12,943	13,512	17,811	21,608	24,337	25,395
Switzerland	19,720	17,989	18,321	18,151	17,273	17,459	24,913	31,010	33,287	31,918
Syria	1,422	1,763	1,785	1,849	1,840	1,965	2,284	2,823	1,390	801
Taiwan	2,367	2,691	2,675	2,882	3,203	3,294	4,008	5,325	6,338	7,576
Tajikistan										
Tanzania	567	657	732	726	639	558	682	325	302	253
Thailand	705	745	767	824	845	772	840	968	1,161	1,338
Timor-Leste										
Togo	695	566	471	439	393	401	544	620	670	638
Tonga	770	851	843	818	854	803	959	1,037	1,213	1,461
Trinidad and Tobago	5,848	6,454	7,393	6,939	6,831	6,411	4,121	4,086	3,799	3,626
Tunisia	1,466	1,375	1,295	1,308	1,272	1,258	1,298	1,367	1,396	1,371
Turkey	2,150	2,129	1,891	1,766	1,681	1,849	1,998	2,278	2,351	2,728
Turkmenistan										
Tuvalu										
Uganda	665	1,044	703	780	581	514	495	769	768	600
Ukraine										
United Arab Emirates	41,312	42,237	36,927	32,717	29,958	27,913	21,199	22,346	19,033	21,142
United Kingdom	10,692	10,411	9,911	9,440	8,932	9,479	11,534	14,311	17,371	17,643
United States	12,553	13,949	14,405	15,514	17,086	18,199	19,035	20,001	21,376	22,814
Uruguay	4,158	4,609	3,743	2,042	1,929	1,873	2,312	2,877	2,959	3,101
Uzbekistan										
Vanuatu	1,166	1,058	1,030	1,031	1,229	1,080	1,016	1,094	1,208	1,167
Venezuela	4,671	5,086	5,042	4,883	3,447	3,472	3,489	2,619	3,293	2,378
Vietnam	653	319	414	613	1,044	319	706	857	465	123
Palestine										
Yemen										
Zambia	756	756	707	591	472	434	290	349	571	591
Zimbabwe										

=== 1990s ===
IMF estimates (1990s)
Country / territory	1990	1991	1992	1993	1994	1995	1996	1997	1998	1999
Afghanistan										
Albania	676	408	260	453	736	904	1,010	707	817	1,038
Algeria	2,684	1,975	2,033	2,057	1,675	1,627	1,783	1,800	1,772	1,769
Andorra										
Angola	1,422	1,333	994	699	493	595	742	842	690	632
Antigua and Barbuda	7,943	8,300	8,503	8,957	9,647	9,258	9,930	10,443	10,932	11,286
Argentina	4,858	6,429	7,654	7,796	8,379	8,295	8,645	9,197	9,283	8,709
Armenia			31	248	199	396	493	507	586	573
Aruba						13,708	13,947	15,339	16,581	16,989
Australia	18,903	18,694	18,137	17,480	19,777	20,960	23,203	23,075	20,431	21,814
Austria	21,708	22,498	24,931	24,020	25,585	30,184	29,657	26,604	27,249	27,106
Azerbaijan			160	175	297	316	411	553	543	576
Bahamas	20,460	19,768	19,417	18,979	19,661	20,271	20,975	21,952	23,301	25,780
Bahrain	10,612	10,688	10,985	11,770	12,277	12,659	12,821	12,950	12,057	12,729
Bangladesh	398	402	401	396	412	450	471	479	488	491
Barbados	8,456	8,462	8,121	8,580	8,915	9,365	9,993	10,557	12,055	12,615
Belarus			1,253	1,114	1,534	1,035	1,429	1,396	1,515	1,211
Belgium	20,120	20,564	22,823	21,724	23,625	28,459	27,535	24,879	25,399	25,309
Belize	2,893	3,076	3,496	3,670	3,658	3,781	3,830	3,795	3,895	4,113
Benin	547	542	585	545	365	481	509	475	495	526
Bhutan	529	459	455	484	498	586	611	674	722	737
Bolivia	718	777	810	812	832	921	1,002	1,065	1,135	1,088
Bosnia and Herzegovina							952	1,225	1,415	1,541
Botswana	2,880	2,799	2,810	2,753	2,885	3,176	3,179	3,162	2,972	3,283
Brazil	3,106	2,678	2,524	2,787	3,495	4,852	5,205	5,321	5,124	3,501
Brunei	19,429	20,171	20,680	20,430	21,350	24,896	24,461	23,344	17,295	18,237
Bulgaria	3,407	337	1,381	758	1,349	2,285	1,495	1,386	1,854	1,693
Burkina Faso	381	375	392	365	214	258	273	252	281	293
Burundi	246	246	222	193	187	198	169	186	168	158
Cape Verde	1,224	1,285	1,356	1,190	1,247	1,541	1,611	1,569	1,632	1,709
Cambodia	113	243	285	274	299	343	325	298	260	286
Cameroon	1,306	1,412	1,256	1,272	841	776	841	827	803	796
Canada	21,572	21,886	20,985	20,210	20,025	20,707	21,326	21,930	21,047	22,341
Central African Republic	1,170	1,114	1,080	964	607	738	642	588	589	591
Chad	397	381	385	326	255	303	325	302	330	280
Chile	2,522	2,850	3,384	3,563	4,049	5,142	5,377	5,789	5,466	4,978
China	346	358	422	525	473	609	710	783	831	878
Colombia	1,691	1,712	1,987	2,209	2,727	3,035	3,137	3,399	3,091	2,674
Comoros	931	906	964	923	665	812	794	718	705	707
Democratic Republic of the Congo	1,192	1,121	973	1,222	640	602	751	643	461	410
Republic of the Congo	1,220	1,238	1,301	1,158	775	896	1,008	893	763	877
Costa Rica	1,881	2,305	2,684	2,927	3,110	3,337	3,278	3,451	3,653	3,715
Ivory Coast	1,349	1,260	1,289	1,162	849	1,092	1,171	1,092	1,134	1,083
Croatia			120	1,591	3,684	4,639	4,919	4,834	5,326	5,181
Cyprus	10,360	10,414	12,158	11,342	12,525	15,397	15,261	14,324	15,182	15,380
Czech Republic						5,861	6,569	6,066	6,521	6,374
Denmark	26,915	27,044	29,632	27,624	30,023	35,441	35,704	32,841	33,405	33,478
Djibouti	1,076	1,070	1,092	1,058	1,110	1,109	1,078	1,068	1,062	1,085
Dominica	2,820	3,087	3,288	3,449	3,713	3,855	4,104	4,254	4,527	4,658
Dominican Republic	1,123	1,365	1,574	1,742	1,916	2,141	2,310	2,495	2,659	2,675
Ecuador	1,127	1,236	1,322	1,511	1,786	1,903	1,957	2,165	2,170	1,536
Egypt	1,871	924	825	897	969	1,098	1,209	1,327	1,455	1,518
El Salvador	886	953	1,041	1,180	1,344	1,548	1,651	1,749	1,860	1,908
Equatorial Guinea	312	299	352	343	246	334	527	965	777	1,251
Eritrea			268	167	195	219	264	271	284	275
Estonia				1,194	1,711	2,721	3,380	3,687	4,096	4,151
Eswatini	1,376	1,373	1,467	1,496	1,621	1,933	1,794	1,888	1,711	1,661
Ethiopia	285	304	310	187	161	161	164	161	142	136
Fiji	1,959	2,012	2,209	2,340	2,591	2,780	2,976	2,900	2,270	2,639
Finland	28,491	25,651	22,497	17,641	20,406	26,322	25,806	24,750	26,065	26,236
France	21,736	21,675	23,776	22,358	23,506	26,927	26,884	24,309	25,025	24,756
Gabon	6,816	5,993	6,016	5,678	4,294	4,957	5,553	5,068	4,162	4,223
Gambia	709	719	745	754	721	731	741	734	733	732
Georgia					173	413	688	818	870	690
Germany	20,323	23,539	26,660	25,697	27,360	31,919	30,779	27,254	27,636	27,217
Ghana	1,032	1,127	1,091	876	790	902	934	933	991	1,001
Greece	9,545	10,140	11,078	10,306	10,968	12,817	13,459	13,071	13,076	13,370
Grenada	2,887	3,118	3,192	3,154	3,273	3,412	3,633	3,861	4,371	4,706
Guatemala	835	989	1,065	1,129	1,243	1,362	1,417	1,564	1,657	1,525
Guinea	690	739	760	716	701	734	747	724	682	655
Guinea-Bissau	572	787	844	637	344	726	676	628	518	496
Guyana	951	1,037	1,146	1,393	1,627	1,832	2,049	2,162	2,036	2,011
Haiti	240	212	125	147	397	618	626	707	774	848
Honduras	988	907	938	915	832	943	884	945	1,021	1,003
Hong Kong	13,374	15,298	17,711	20,066	22,194	23,071	24,699	27,215	25,649	24,969
Hungary	3,323	3,361	3,746	3,884	4,184	4,506	4,538	4,601	4,746	4,795
Iceland	26,434	28,040	28,273	24,540	24,942	27,615	28,686	28,594	31,712	33,033
India	371	306	319	303	348	375	401	416	414	442
Indonesia	771	848	908	1,013	1,116	1,254	1,394	1,308	572	830
Iran	13,012	6,646	1,087	1,368	1,670	2,370	3,212	3,685	4,046	5,371
Iraq										
Ireland	13,649	13,752	15,337	14,267	15,460	19,093	20,788	22,476	24,210	26,237
Israel	13,058	13,948	15,047	14,734	16,396	18,961	20,196	20,446	20,114	19,766
Italy	20,537	21,674	22,988	18,470	19,043	20,723	23,136	21,913	22,395	22,075
Jamaica	2,023	1,846	1,851	2,308	2,293	2,729	3,052	3,434	3,558	3,564
Japan	26,399	30,109	32,739	37,193	40,795	44,960	39,944	36,344	32,848	37,042
Jordan	1,334	1,305	1,553	1,553	1,687	1,751	1,778	1,811	1,950	1,962
Kazakhstan			169	305	752	1,061	1,359	1,459	1,480	1,132
Kenya	737	675	645	435	506	624	687	678	742	648
Kiribati	505	562	827	781	876	884	1,032	1,001	919	931
South Korea	6,813	7,873	8,387	9,181	10,730	13,002	13,865	12,841	8,573	11,057
Kosovo										
Kuwait				15,825	14,767	15,088	16,623	15,330	12,797	14,297
Kyrgyzstan			208	148	246	330	396	379	344	258
Laos	406	465	518	567	642	727	739	683	254	265
Latvia			613	990	1,671	2,096	2,348	2,597	2,882	3,053
Lebanon	779	1,198	1,461	1,947	2,312	2,771	3,179	3,782	4,082	4,041
Lesotho	351	403	460	455	474	529	495	517	475	468
Liberia										
Libya	7,115	7,701	7,642	6,742	6,163	6,876	7,384	7,444	6,015	7,115
Liechtenstein										
Lithuania						1,858	2,343	2,842	3,179	3,126
Luxembourg	33,067	35,347	39,061	39,483	43,307	50,705	49,719	44,203	45,637	49,341
Macau										
Madagascar	348	280	312	332	279	296	369	309	310	293
Malawi	421	524	422	483	278	320	512	583	373	368
Malaysia	2,586	2,886	3,379	3,717	4,029	4,671	5,176	5,012	3,521	3,763
Maldives	1,092	1,185	1,343	1,479	1,591	1,903	2,108	2,554	2,659	2,843
Mali	354	383	386	373	272	328	358	318	354	362
Malta						8,907	9,035	9,075	9,545	9,904
Marshall Islands								2,230	2,241	2,231
Mauritania	899	1,002	1,027	853	873	913	904	854	812	773
Mauritius	2,590	2,819	3,133	3,191	3,493	3,955	4,047	3,753	3,752	3,911
Mexico	3,640	4,282	4,873	5,933	6,087	4,110	4,597	5,485	5,759	6,436
Federated States of Micronesia						2,097	2,083	1,950	2,060	2,065
Moldova			290	374	390	485	572	654	576	398
Mongolia	1,289	1,325	722	352	419	647	592	512	481	446
Montenegro										
Morocco	1,351	1,418	1,454	1,341	1,482	1,601	1,739	1,553	1,634	1,604
Mozambique	272	289	203	201	198	198	253	297	330	364
Myanmar									116	142
Namibia	1,909	2,026	2,265	2,099	2,283	2,499	2,434	2,465	2,239	2,179
Nauru										
Nepal	228	243	214	224	228	242	244	260	253	255
Netherlands	21,612	22,089	24,226	23,389	24,971	29,394	29,141	26,853	28,057	28,440
New Zealand	13,425	12,426	11,751	12,538	14,612	16,933	18,506	18,207	14,889	15,349
Nicaragua					898	935	947	940	973	999
Niger	435	395	394	343	211	242	244	224	250	232
Nigeria	935	879	742	784	1,074	1,722	2,185	2,310	2,504	667
North Macedonia			1,264	1,384	1,824	2,387	2,348	1,980	1,889	1,932
Norway	28,082	28,345	30,238	27,710	29,051	34,573	36,977	36,257	34,445	36,059
Oman	7,268	6,806	7,213	6,995	7,011	7,285	7,869	7,984	6,921	7,555
Pakistan	616	684	713	736	723	824	839	808	785	725
Palau										
Panama	2,119	2,281	2,538	2,715	2,835	2,840	3,280	3,515	3,773	3,913
Papua New Guinea	1,266	1,444	1,547	1,714	1,835	1,582	1,640	1,527	1,138	1,013
Paraguay	1,207	1,674	1,671	1,650	1,747	1,963	2,071	2,061	1,873	1,749
Peru	1,286	1,512	1,528	1,456	1,815	2,119	2,157	2,230	2,092	1,863
Philippines	829	830	947	950	1,095	1,237	1,316	1,280	988	1,112
Poland	1,634	2,112	2,323	2,359	2,701	3,624	4,079	4,089	4,473	4,362
Portugal	7,957	9,026	10,863	9,548	9,978	11,787	12,188	11,595	12,217	12,488
Puerto Rico	8,676	9,093	9,687	10,256	10,943	11,668	12,305	12,968	14,430	15,293
Qatar	13,150	11,501	13,039	11,797	12,009	13,690	15,143	18,842	15,422	19,690
Romania	1,642	1,241	848	1,147	1,317	1,563	1,565	1,572	1,885	1,601
Russia			481	1,325	1,982	2,264	2,787	2,933	1,949	1,424
Rwanda	418	299	317	326	223	245	269	346	338	284
Samoa									1,656	1,509
San Marino										
São Tomé and Príncipe	1,017	891	763	1,000	1,025	794	1,017	679	524	550
Saudi Arabia	8,562	9,143	9,243	8,741	8,664	8,957	9,667	9,859	8,513	9,145
Senegal	936	894	931	853	561	693	707	643	686	690
Serbia										1,710
Seychelles										
Sierra Leone	349	417	363	413	492	471	507	455	357	348
Singapore	12,763	14,502	16,136	18,290	21,552	24,915	26,233	26,376	21,829	21,797
Slovakia				2,606	2,990	3,761	4,044	4,097	4,254	3,873
Slovenia			9,646	8,364	8,474	10,756	10,792	10,452	11,124	11,458
Solomon Islands	811	831	951	1,031	1,340	1,517	1,603	1,608	1,361	1,414
Somalia										
South Africa	3,425	3,585	3,801	3,715	3,786	4,144	3,867	3,931	3,500	3,415
South Sudan										
Spain	13,673	14,676	15,989	13,390	13,400	15,453	16,113	14,771	15,443	15,748
Sri Lanka	565	611	651	689	787	829	903	1,004	1,026	1,026
Saint Kitts and Nevis	4,998	5,004	5,508	5,929	6,541	6,957	7,325	8,140	8,376	8,776
Saint Lucia	4,201	4,394	4,756	4,761	4,888	5,143	5,240	5,280	5,667	5,879
Saint Vincent and the Grenadines	2,456	2,584	2,815	2,896	2,924	3,188	3,341	3,500	3,756	3,923
Sudan	87	95	113	187	206	240	293	351	367	352
Suriname	1,412	1,537	1,405	1,094	1,212	2,272	2,788	2,947	3,493	2,839
Sweden	30,184	31,434	32,494	24,316	25,940	30,218	33,009	30,319	30,594	30,956
Switzerland	40,437	40,413	41,494	39,999	43,896	51,039	48,920	42,218	43,241	42,352
Syria	967	972	984	995	1,061	1,133	1,186	1,081	1,028	1,043
Taiwan	8,167	9,082	10,716	11,257	12,100	13,066	13,588	13,949	12,767	13,753
Tajikistan			53	122	148	100	183	193	222	178
Tanzania	198	225	204	182	186	210	255	296	354	354
Thailand	1,564	1,769	1,999	2,209	2,491	2,847	3,044	2,468	1,846	2,033
Timor-Leste										
Togo	746	717	731	563	435	545	571	562	519	508
Tonga	1,499	1,751	1,833	1,884	1,948	2,123	2,228	2,264	2,153	1,994
Trinidad and Tobago	4,222	4,393	4,474	3,744	4,027	4,322	4,659	4,633	4,873	5,480
Tunisia	1,698	1,752	2,051	1,888	1,983	2,250	2,402	2,310	2,397	2,492
Turkey	3,766	3,719	3,847	4,294	3,049	3,910	4,130	4,254	4,446	4,013
Turkmenistan			215	1,203	993	1,256	499	554	583	776
Tuvalu										
Uganda	472	238	216	247	346	402	401	424	402	371
Ukraine		9,970	414	633	716	727	884	1,004	845	643
United Arab Emirates	27,485	25,577	25,834	25,033	25,737	26,309	29,821	29,910	26,572	27,834
United Kingdom	20,899	21,716	22,372	19,997	21,443	23,159	24,430	26,797	28,288	28,740
United States	23,848	24,303	25,393	26,364	27,674	28,671	29,947	31,440	32,834	34,496
Uruguay	3,588	4,299	4,911	5,684	6,558	7,207	7,613	7,960	8,365	7,848
Uzbekistan			233	351	407	624	838	858	859	965
Vanuatu	1,262	1,475	1,502	1,413	1,574	1,637	1,672	1,701	1,594	1,588
Venezuela	2,493	2,685	2,968	2,876	2,742	3,560	3,175	3,779	3,970	4,133
Vietnam	122	141	179	235	286	359	419	449	448	465
Palestine					1,227	1,322	1,296	1,351	1,417	1,442
Yemen										
Zambia	536	470	447	426	426	432	400	466	373	350
Zimbabwe	1,532	1,383	1,106	1,038	1,055	1,060	1,256	1,302	1,521	1,483

=== 2000s ===
IMF estimates (2000s)
Country / territory	2000	2001	2002	2003	2004	2005	2006	2007	2008	2009
Afghanistan			208	201	218	253	272	330	390	441
Albania	1,129	1,283	1,428	1,830	2,371	2,674	2,973	3,595	4,371	4,114
Algeria	1,948	1,919	1,958	2,305	2,840	3,258	3,691	4,208	5,215	4,262
Andorra										
Angola	781	739	999	1,134	1,451	2,146	2,930	3,515	4,578	3,645
Antigua and Barbuda	11,919	11,417	11,564	12,091	12,959	14,297	16,124	18,197	18,843	16,580
Argentina	8,639	8,085	2,998	3,761	4,314	5,164	5,976	7,316	9,147	8,338
Armenia	595	662	747	887	1,137	1,567	2,055	2,982	3,804	2,847
Aruba	18,403	18,615	18,990	19,484	21,184	22,019	22,734	24,606	26,167	23,394
Australia	20,952	19,539	21,740	27,337	32,915	36,320	38,048	45,295	49,335	45,926
Austria	24,498	24,431	26,316	32,115	36,609	38,190	40,388	46,630	51,575	47,816
Azerbaijan	656	675	761	880	1,040	1,567	2,453	3,814	5,564	4,965
Bahamas	26,601	26,971	28,358	27,896	28,057	30,031	30,595	31,499	30,788	28,793
Bahrain	14,819	14,485	14,075	15,102	16,642	18,730	20,086	21,797	24,289	20,292
Bangladesh	483	481	491	532	563	572	610	669	761	841
Barbados	12,967	12,907	13,092	13,503	14,524	16,245	18,066	20,178	20,581	19,214
Belarus	1,080	1,287	1,530	1,880	2,459	3,232	3,979	4,897	6,591	5,351
Belgium	23,137	23,067	25,044	30,708	35,498	36,945	38,842	44,497	48,493	45,056
Belize	4,557	4,577	4,736	4,857	5,066	5,198	5,464	5,710	5,666	5,357
Benin	488	492	546	676	758	780	809	912	1,060	1,023
Bhutan	780	790	837	976	1,086	1,246	1,314	1,587	1,991	1,844
Bolivia	1,089	1,040	999	1,001	1,064	1,148	1,355	1,539	1,937	2,004
Bosnia and Herzegovina	1,484	1,545	1,790	2,260	2,703	2,983	3,417	4,200	5,111	4,728
Botswana	3,388	3,189	3,092	4,206	4,880	5,344	5,292	5,529	5,503	5,083
Brazil	3,752	3,164	2,844	3,078	3,648	4,806	5,906	7,374	8,863	8,641
Brunei	20,473	18,646	19,038	20,976	24,760	29,460	34,869	36,678	42,530	31,287
Bulgaria	1,630	1,798	2,098	2,715	3,375	3,877	4,482	5,824	7,201	6,892
Burkina Faso	248	259	285	362	404	441	456	515	619	601
Burundi	153	148	133	120	130	147	162	166	190	198
Cape Verde	1,690	1,875	2,015	2,524	2,839	3,091	3,174	3,565	4,190	3,919
Cambodia	304	327	351	389	451	532	614	724	875	896
Cameroon	687	715	787	987	1,132	1,144	1,192	1,326	1,492	1,460
Canada	24,297	23,860	24,280	28,340	32,178	36,441	40,559	44,717	46,774	40,989
Central African Republic	371	384	402	446	491	508	542	612	664	638
Chad	244	289	325	429	667	858	929	1,004	1,197	1,064
Chile	5,093	4,601	4,473	4,817	6,176	7,551	9,405	10,448	10,770	10,192
China	966	1,062	1,160	1,303	1,526	1,773	2,124	2,729	3,516	3,889
Colombia	2,535	2,461	2,424	2,314	2,827	3,494	3,837	4,834	5,622	5,331
Comoros	633	681	764	959	1,071	1,106	1,139	1,290	1,454	1,408
Democratic Republic of the Congo	397	147	171	172	189	227	266	311	367	292
Republic of the Congo	1,156	934	1,000	1,128	1,440	1,812	2,117	2,220	2,848	2,281
Costa Rica	3,941	4,042	4,123	4,228	4,484	4,756	5,309	6,194	6,994	6,879
Ivory Coast	913	926	997	1,199	1,260	1,262	1,279	1,422	1,650	1,608
Croatia	5,055	5,365	6,215	8,190	9,714	10,449	11,502	13,758	15,884	14,460
Cyprus	14,465	14,905	16,188	20,389	23,970	25,527	27,448	31,774	36,009	32,650
Czech Republic	6,049	6,659	8,097	9,857	11,785	13,459	15,282	18,514	22,896	19,864
Denmark	30,777	30,823	33,304	40,572	46,685	48,998	52,214	58,786	64,827	58,537
Djibouti	1,088	1,107	1,121	1,160	1,213	1,271	1,359	1,478	1,692	1,722
Dominica	4,681	4,775	4,680	4,826	5,165	5,127	5,497	5,940	6,463	6,904
Dominican Republic	2,894	3,007	3,158	2,461	2,541	4,008	4,189	4,803	5,191	5,147
Ecuador	1,405	1,824	2,097	2,358	2,633	2,961	3,298	3,534	4,258	4,111
Egypt	1,637	1,566	1,355	1,252	1,196	1,331	1,564	1,862	2,271	2,579
El Salvador	1,983	2,058	2,115	2,208	2,286	2,447	2,666	2,831	2,983	2,910
Equatorial Guinea	1,886	2,617	3,106	5,374	8,188	10,816	12,744	15,785	22,832	16,579
Eritrea	239	245	227	259	316	301	321	340	301	416
Estonia	4,085	4,513	5,360	7,218	8,925	10,429	12,659	16,766	18,274	14,757
Eswatini	1,621	1,426	1,315	2,000	2,510	2,858	2,948	3,084	2,916	3,159
Ethiopia	137	134	124	133	152	182	218	273	361	425
Fiji	2,275	2,234	2,463	3,073	3,597	3,940	4,051	4,405	4,554	3,682
Finland	24,370	24,999	27,000	32,954	37,812	39,142	41,300	48,587	53,895	47,539
France	22,502	22,487	24,295	29,675	33,876	34,965	36,685	41,763	45,754	41,943
Gabon	4,477	4,066	4,210	5,016	5,838	6,943	7,271	8,652	10,418	7,857
Gambia	694	671	578	534	593	616	615	725	859	775
Georgia	764	820	875	1,035	1,338	1,683	2,052	2,700	3,420	2,891
Germany	24,158	24,122	25,753	31,074	35,001	35,592	37,530	43,022	47,147	43,174
Ghana	629	650	735	882	995	1,177	1,344	1,546	1,704	1,493
Greece	11,827	12,186	13,790	18,036	21,468	22,101	24,452	28,476	31,741	29,426
Grenada	5,057	5,046	5,192	5,641	5,722	6,658	6,673	7,227	7,844	7,333
Guatemala	1,549	1,649	1,790	1,844	1,950	2,153	2,342	2,566	2,888	2,673
Guinea	558	521	533	633	697	605	540	834	924	973
Guinea-Bissau	328	338	375	435	448	482	468	543	672	614
Guyana	2,017	2,024	2,093	2,144	2,233	2,306	2,552	2,982	3,330	3,457
Haiti	794	721	684	541	660	773	795	992	1,074	1,169
Honduras	1,080	1,132	1,132	1,156	1,215	1,304	1,426	1,578	1,733	1,781
Hong Kong	25,574	25,167	24,731	23,856	24,874	26,552	28,028	30,495	31,488	30,594
Hungary	4,625	5,275	6,647	8,400	10,281	11,200	11,472	13,920	15,752	13,040
Iceland	32,755	29,374	32,858	40,090	48,057	58,405	58,927	71,375	57,846	41,371
India	443	450	469	544	624	710	802	1,022	993	1,095
Indonesia	870	834	1,003	1,186	1,280	1,404	1,766	2,064	2,417	2,469
Iran	7,050	6,255	2,466	2,872	3,374	3,983	4,631	6,018	6,901	6,955
Iraq				609	1,374	1,829	2,321	3,091	4,472	3,702
Ireland	26,187	28,121	32,482	40,939	47,352	50,441	53,701	60,730	60,948	51,910
Israel	21,611	20,878	18,975	19,561	20,466	21,163	22,393	25,553	30,069	28,321
Italy	20,206	20,576	22,474	27,673	31,452	32,148	33,603	37,989	40,969	37,143
Jamaica	3,602	3,621	3,806	3,680	3,956	4,351	4,611	4,955	5,267	4,624
Japan	39,757	34,915	33,328	35,832	38,686	38,165	36,385	36,199	40,411	41,840
Jordan	1,984	2,057	2,161	2,234	2,323	2,520	2,943	3,248	4,074	4,232
Kazakhstan	1,229	1,491	1,658	2,068	2,874	3,771	5,292	6,771	8,514	7,165
Kenya	617	617	612	668	693	778	855	1,028	1,119	1,123
Kiribati	890	755	854	1,083	1,147	1,231	1,189	1,432	1,519	1,410
South Korea	12,717	11,983	13,637	15,211	17,108	20,163	22,597	25,075	22,291	19,933
Kosovo	1,506	1,704	1,807	2,206	2,275	2,318	2,400	2,866	3,025	2,878
Kuwait	17,639	15,993	16,857	20,585	24,864	35,991	43,618	47,539	53,059	38,156
Kyrgyzstan	281	310	323	383	436	479	547	725	972	877
Laos	317	318	329	397	460	526	662	787	969	1,032
Latvia	3,260	3,481	3,988	4,892	6,075	7,260	9,180	13,339	15,647	11,910
Lebanon	3,939	3,955	4,236	4,326	4,625	4,630	4,666	5,162	5,958	7,150
Lesotho	460	387	429	633	811	886	884	900	840	978
Liberia	303	306	312	232	286	293	333	388	464	470
Libya	7,445	6,515	3,836	4,809	5,936	8,338	10,049	11,174	13,921	9,544
Liechtenstein	82,744	81,268	86,422	97,243	108,640	114,293	124,150	142,493	155,978	136,253
Lithuania	3,298	3,532	4,148	5,505	6,725	7,861	9,217	12,306	15,010	11,885
Luxembourg	48,984	48,719	53,228	66,161	77,031	81,728	91,478	108,344	121,616	110,249
Macau		15,724	16,734	18,462	23,006	25,110	28,970	34,269	38,286	39,826
Madagascar	307	351	335	387	299	335	355	460	562	489
Malawi	353	338	384	345	366	377	401	432	505	571
Malaysia	4,348	4,189	4,442	4,740	5,245	5,678	6,351	7,481	8,766	7,544
Maldives	2,967	2,780	2,952	3,691	4,238	3,960	5,269	6,128	7,338	7,451
Mali	301	340	377	435	489	545	578	669	768	772
Malta	10,398	10,403	11,307	13,655	15,277	15,873	16,748	19,655	22,488	21,319
Marshall Islands	2,247	2,427	2,657	2,625	2,634	2,695	2,781	2,905	2,794	2,893
Mauritania	673	642	635	712	797	963	1,357	1,425	1,647	1,476
Mauritius	4,158	4,081	4,253	5,073	5,702	5,590	5,773	6,663	8,138	7,417
Mexico	7,468	7,902	7,935	7,390	7,807	8,626	9,457	10,064	10,438	8,347
Federated States of Micronesia	2,176	2,251	2,256	2,289	2,234	2,341	2,376	2,422	2,511	2,678
Moldova	448	506	569	680	894	1,031	1,179	1,526	2,103	1,891
Mongolia	473	521	566	639	790	989	1,322	1,616	2,109	1,688
Montenegro	1,594	1,891	2,078	2,742	3,375	3,674	4,423	5,981	7,389	6,719
Morocco	1,477	1,481	1,566	1,909	2,159	2,233	2,427	2,760	3,189	3,163
Mozambique	335	310	317	341	399	433	451	499	580	536
Myanmar	169	154	148	188	226	254	282	369	523	629
Namibia	2,192	1,945	1,811	2,611	3,458	3,748	3,897	4,354	4,181	4,324
Nauru					3,165	3,066	2,930	2,462	3,553	4,730
Nepal	266	269	269	281	319	355	388	440	530	540
Netherlands	26,339	27,056	29,505	35,960	40,652	42,226	45,159	52,182	58,383	53,258
New Zealand	14,022	13,669	15,707	20,460	24,849	27,385	26,221	31,908	31,819	28,341
Nicaragua	1,031	1,055	1,012	1,010	1,078	1,153	1,225	1,327	1,499	1,445
Niger	197	208	227	267	285	321	335	389	477	462
Nigeria	765	801	1,000	1,064	1,310	1,656	2,113	2,454	3,002	2,631
North Macedonia	1,878	1,840	1,974	2,441	2,810	3,120	3,440	4,204	5,027	4,799
Norway	37,909	38,410	42,962	50,119	57,763	67,235	74,868	86,372	98,613	81,703
Oman	9,266	9,088	9,285	9,793	11,043	13,563	15,946	17,716	25,061	19,236
Pakistan	733	697	690	772	885	949	1,032	1,146	1,228	1,109
Palau	7,818	8,269	8,369	7,889	8,424	9,326	9,766	10,225	10,581	9,970
Panama	3,935	3,950	4,045	4,216	4,591	4,961	5,467	6,248	7,270	7,720
Papua New Guinea	1,008	862	815	995	1,112	1,270	1,412	1,576	1,884	1,833
Paraguay	1,718	1,622	1,356	1,434	1,776	1,964	2,437	3,217	4,405	3,973
Peru	1,908	1,911	1,997	2,149	2,408	2,671	3,138	3,639	4,249	4,298
Philippines	1,087	1,004	1,050	1,063	1,137	1,261	1,471	1,765	2,012	1,924
Poland	4,499	5,003	5,222	5,719	6,715	8,046	9,065	11,271	14,052	11,563
Portugal	11,531	11,735	12,928	15,794	18,056	18,791	19,840	22,814	24,946	23,126
Puerto Rico	16,192	18,244	18,973	19,820	20,989	21,959	22,936	23,665	24,898	25,769
Qatar	30,461	28,600	30,701	35,920	42,548	54,358	60,592	65,934	72,485	53,823
Romania	1,668	1,801	2,108	2,672	3,488	4,609	5,745	8,274	10,446	8,541
Russia	1,897	2,248	2,536	3,166	4,362	5,655	7,362	9,686	12,371	9,091
Rwanda	266	249	242	258	278	335	363	437	539	578
Samoa	1,551	1,548	1,631	1,921	2,339	2,705	2,860	3,128	3,738	3,350
San Marino					59,313	61,151	64,499	72,992	79,110	67,012
São Tomé and Príncipe	533	489	533	621	663	774	805	852	1,082	1,128
Saudi Arabia	10,449	9,898	9,937	11,028	12,891	15,943	17,827	19,196	23,404	18,837
Senegal	614	648	681	832	932	993	1,028	1,198	1,404	1,308
Serbia	1,388	1,819	2,400	3,158	3,580	3,782	4,509	6,113	7,363	6,413
Seychelles										
Sierra Leone	327	363	400	428	437	498	559	600	666	627
Singapore	23,853	21,700	22,160	23,730	27,608	29,961	33,768	39,433	40,009	38,927
Slovakia	3,836	3,976	4,620	6,300	8,009	9,104	10,698	14,379	18,066	16,581
Slovenia	10,194	10,398	11,666	14,736	17,125	18,023	19,614	23,819	27,610	24,563
Solomon Islands	1,175	1,109	908	896	974	1,118	1,213	1,329	1,445	1,461
Somalia										
South Africa	3,377	2,974	2,778	4,191	5,393	6,008	6,251	6,752	6,338	6,538
South Sudan										
Spain	14,714	15,299	16,937	21,335	24,698	26,251	28,177	32,340	35,380	32,159
Sri Lanka	1,065	1,017	1,062	1,163	1,260	1,478	1,698	1,929	2,411	2,472
Saint Kitts and Nevis	9,735	10,516	10,870	10,484	11,399	12,376	14,427	15,376	16,627	16,510
Saint Lucia	5,876	5,566	5,564	6,055	6,491	6,859	7,732	8,079	8,481	8,243
Saint Vincent and the Grenadines	3,973	4,285	4,518	4,710	5,082	5,354	5,934	6,573	6,740	6,564
Sudan	422	493	555	636	773	997	1,250	1,600	1,701	1,401
Suriname	2,902	2,466	3,078	3,550	4,034	4,773	5,546	6,123	7,267	7,865
Sweden	29,597	27,219	29,905	37,220	42,673	43,291	46,364	53,365	55,596	46,497
Switzerland	39,416	40,326	43,285	50,135	55,502	57,233	60,126	66,482	75,686	73,162
Syria	1,203	1,237	1,305	1,209	1,361	1,510	1,726	2,016	2,557	2,557
Taiwan	14,844	13,357	13,651	14,041	15,290	16,427	16,893	17,724	18,054	16,905
Tajikistan	159	167	188	236	309	337	402	519	702	666
Tanzania	361	358	363	382	409	438	469	526	653	672
Thailand	2,006	1,890	2,090	2,348	2,642	2,868	3,331	3,919	4,309	4,135
Timor-Leste	514	615	553	539	477	495	472	548	636	695
Togo	421	408	458	554	577	569	570	654	771	769
Tonga	2,046	1,818	1,829	2,015	2,289	2,582	2,865	2,920	3,361	3,040
Trinidad and Tobago	6,546	7,040	7,204	8,977	10,488	12,539	14,351	16,838	21,561	14,839
Tunisia	2,307	2,345	2,434	2,859	3,218	3,301	3,485	3,909	4,462	4,281
Turkey	4,257	3,115	3,616	4,751	6,040	7,405	8,008	9,791	11,089	9,108
Turkmenistan	999	1,364	1,694	2,201	2,707	3,239	3,990	4,785	3,918	3,636
Tuvalu			1,740	2,074	2,384	2,347	2,462	2,863	3,184	2,757
Uganda	355	348	362	362	431	483	528	634	784	816
Ukraine	665	815	919	1,096	1,427	1,910	2,408	3,220	4,095	2,655
United Arab Emirates	32,496	30,878	30,969	32,167	34,945	39,389	45,240	46,090	48,549	37,428
United Kingdom	28,328	27,910	30,083	34,454	40,388	42,110	44,597	50,477	48,010	39,093
United States	36,313	37,101	37,946	39,405	41,642	44,034	46,217	47,943	48,471	47,102
Uruguay	7,432	6,804	4,441	3,942	4,477	5,664	6,377	7,623	9,857	10,232
Uzbekistan	780	653	535	555	650	766	901	1,165	1,471	1,692
Vanuatu	1,573	1,457	1,453	1,706	1,928	2,018	2,196	2,554	2,810	2,787
Venezuela	4,821	4,964	3,778	3,266	4,312	5,422	6,647	8,615	10,954	9,331
Vietnam	499	513	547	610	757	873	996	1,152	1,447	1,481
Palestine	1,413	1,276	1,103	1,197	1,351	1,461	1,481	1,564	1,913	2,062
Yemen										
Zambia	359	397	394	446	549	711	1,052	1,119	1,376	1,136
Zimbabwe	1,433	1,424	1,364	1,215	1,192	1,130	1,002	955	818	1,168

=== 2010s ===
IMF estimates (2010s)
Country / territory	2010	2011	2012	2013	2014	2015	2016	2017	2018	2019
Afghanistan	544	612	666	639	630	594	520	530	500	500
Albania	4,098	4,440	4,274	4,496	4,585	4,182	4,473	4,988	5,861	6,022
Algeria	4,941	5,946	6,058	5,998	6,109	4,692	4,427	4,554	4,568	4,453
Andorra	49,030	51,957	45,714	45,630	46,299	38,877	39,595	40,018	42,230	40,688
Angola	4,102	5,184	5,702	5,876	6,055	4,676	3,991	4,694	3,689	2,941
Antigua and Barbuda	15,343	15,045	15,724	15,051	15,423	15,839	16,164	16,401	17,471	17,899
Argentina	10,413	12,788	13,890	14,489	13,209	14,895	12,773	14,618	11,786	9,942
Armenia	3,066	3,354	3,622	3,690	3,864	3,527	3,540	3,883	4,205	4,599
Aruba	22,460	24,440	24,335	25,458	25,945	27,328	27,470	28,425	30,083	30,707
Australia	56,757	67,510	68,733	65,525	61,890	51,652	51,985	55,996	56,575	54,544
Austria	46,662	51,127	48,302	50,321	51,343	43,987	45,033	47,056	50,963	50,010
Azerbaijan	5,881	7,239	7,546	7,927	7,939	5,525	3,898	4,218	4,760	4,841
Bahamas	28,725	28,366	29,895	29,019	30,664	32,101	31,838	33,011	33,669	34,568
Bahrain	21,819	25,033	26,439	26,990	26,452	23,734	23,800	24,785	26,324	27,260
Bangladesh	936	1,032	1,058	1,176	1,340	1,496	1,679	1,840	1,992	2,154
Barbados	19,418	19,826	19,484	20,035	20,061	20,054	19,927	20,465	20,950	21,474
Belarus	6,033	6,486	6,951	7,995	8,333	5,954	5,038	5,785	6,358	6,838
Belgium	44,461	47,916	45,029	47,056	48,129	41,032	41,918	44,111	47,627	46,858
Belize	5,424	5,578	5,737	5,957	6,124	6,148	6,151	6,102	6,035	6,167
Benin	974	1,059	1,072	1,169	1,205	1,003	1,010	1,060	1,158	1,155
Bhutan	2,191	2,665	2,756	2,766	2,691	2,929	3,025	3,278	3,501	3,435
Bolivia	2,229	2,697	2,990	3,367	3,623	3,635	3,721	4,078	4,238	4,234
Bosnia and Herzegovina	4,646	5,100	4,781	5,150	5,272	4,665	4,877	5,240	5,865	5,868
Botswana	6,216	7,287	6,596	6,667	7,122	6,141	6,749	7,105	7,408	7,159
Brazil	11,341	13,326	12,465	12,407	12,231	8,893	8,813	10,056	9,282	9,011
Brunei	35,446	47,089	47,782	44,865	41,935	31,361	27,329	28,448	31,068	29,872
Bulgaria	6,769	7,878	7,457	7,709	7,938	7,104	7,596	8,410	9,452	9,856
Burkina Faso	625	725	732	760	765	630	664	708	779	768
Burundi	217	230	232	235	251	281	263	276	256	245
Cape Verde	3,819	4,259	3,958	4,175	4,178	3,561	3,749	4,030	4,432	4,505
Cambodia	946	1,091	1,188	1,297	1,440	1,541	1,672	1,812	2,018	2,183
Cameroon	1,400	1,514	1,450	1,576	1,650	1,415	1,441	1,496	1,612	1,555
Canada	47,626	52,286	52,745	52,711	51,025	43,628	42,382	45,192	46,618	46,431
Central African Republic	707	830	742	522	635	574	593	633	668	676
Chad	1,177	1,350	1,398	1,351	1,331	1,032	898	883	980	929
Chile	12,748	14,602	15,371	15,787	14,614	13,507	13,705	14,970	15,752	14,604
China	4,619	5,689	6,381	7,129	7,756	8,154	8,231	8,964	10,064	10,341
Colombia	6,499	7,518	8,237	8,410	8,312	6,337	6,037	6,577	6,924	6,540
Comoros	1,385	1,527	1,485	1,596	1,609	1,323	1,357	1,414	1,519	1,502
Democratic Republic of the Congo	339	388	428	481	512	520	477	455	548	533
Republic of the Congo	2,965	3,414	3,756	3,720	3,625	2,456	2,107	2,227	2,716	2,481
Costa Rica	8,269	9,271	10,107	10,765	10,854	11,635	11,987	12,185	12,458	12,757
Ivory Coast	1,598	1,603	1,624	1,843	2,026	1,846	1,896	2,000	2,167	2,174
Croatia	13,743	14,687	13,518	14,135	14,189	12,284	12,816	13,898	15,466	15,567
Cyprus	31,522	32,911	29,075	27,768	27,013	23,130	24,359	26,370	29,326	29,431
Czech Republic	20,184	22,069	20,024	20,257	20,063	17,945	18,732	20,882	23,662	24,013
Denmark	58,240	61,920	58,560	61,512	62,701	53,317	54,699	57,684	61,457	59,490
Djibouti	1,837	2,039	2,190	2,315	2,471	2,653	2,804	2,926	3,038	3,173
Dominica	6,981	7,160	6,995	7,153	7,389	7,596	8,089	7,507	7,981	8,466
Dominican Republic	5,683	6,055	6,262	6,401	6,789	7,120	7,506	7,784	8,286	8,615
Ecuador	4,579	5,210	5,682	6,144	6,422	5,975	5,908	6,221	6,293	6,199
Egypt	2,923	3,077	3,569	3,584	3,705	3,934	3,862	2,593	2,710	3,214
El Salvador	3,040	3,331	3,498	3,582	3,666	3,790	3,901	4,020	4,184	4,320
Equatorial Guinea	17,167	21,476	21,570	20,253	19,276	11,219	9,200	9,621	10,130	8,356
Eritrea	501	643	694	597	787	603	655	558	581	567
Estonia	14,697	17,552	17,579	19,311	20,587	17,735	18,661	20,844	23,629	24,025
Eswatini	3,876	4,191	4,221	3,952	3,774	3,418	3,237	3,857	3,973	3,913
Ethiopia	381	396	524	562	639	725	814	876	883	983
Fiji	4,011	4,803	5,022	5,277	5,622	5,397	5,658	6,050	6,270	5,968
Finland	46,648	51,175	47,694	49,804	50,181	42,625	43,503	46,110	49,698	48,396
France	40,989	44,198	41,150	42,952	43,277	36,776	37,081	38,757	41,540	40,487
Gabon	8,933	10,893	9,903	9,761	9,747	7,453	7,082	7,370	8,199	8,111
Gambia	801	711	693	654	568	609	644	640	693	734
Georgia	3,270	4,101	4,518	4,711	4,834	4,090	4,142	4,420	4,801	4,739
Germany	43,220	47,627	44,791	47,332	49,174	42,207	43,320	46,057	49,623	48,455
Ghana	1,784	2,055	2,087	2,295	1,950	1,723	1,912	2,012	2,195	2,187
Greece	26,680	25,458	21,584	21,545	21,477	17,987	17,982	18,707	20,005	19,495
Grenada	7,340	7,300	7,434	7,760	8,334	9,056	9,572	10,099	10,419	10,779
Guatemala	2,862	3,206	3,307	3,444	3,688	3,893	4,059	4,323	4,353	4,511
Guinea	864	906	1,041	1,113	1,161	1,084	1,060	1,274	1,348	1,505
Guinea-Bissau	644	775	688	712	713	708	748	864	895	837
Guyana	3,837	4,445	5,440	5,617	5,604	5,795	6,006	6,255	6,053	6,174
Haiti	1,175	1,269	1,316	1,409	1,409	1,359	1,263	1,337	1,442	1,277
Honduras	1,893	2,074	2,125	2,080	2,180	2,271	2,307	2,413	2,465	2,502
Hong Kong	32,421	34,955	36,624	38,233	40,185	42,325	43,488	46,026	48,310	48,278
Hungary	13,171	14,191	12,935	13,709	14,328	12,759	13,189	14,716	16,593	17,003
Iceland	43,833	49,365	47,716	51,437	56,463	54,796	64,667	75,367	77,963	71,496
India	1,348	1,445	1,426	1,426	1,543	1,569	1,687	1,922	1,933	2,002
Indonesia	3,177	3,690	3,740	3,667	3,533	3,373	3,605	3,886	3,946	4,193
Iran	8,072	9,609	6,406	6,421	6,824	5,972	5,975	6,264	4,187	3,035
Iraq	4,474	5,849	6,693	7,021	6,704	5,045	4,657	5,117	6,038	6,049
Ireland	48,551	52,518	49,282	52,402	57,055	64,056	63,841	71,801	80,431	81,492
Israel	31,233	34,309	33,110	36,815	38,099	35,971	37,394	40,825	42,101	43,929
Italy	35,964	38,476	34,926	35,723	36,023	30,610	31,358	32,797	35,043	33,767
Jamaica	5,021	5,471	5,590	5,374	5,238	5,489	5,486	5,769	6,139	6,218
Japan	45,547	49,123	49,657	41,406	39,221	35,711	40,252	39,751	40,747	41,560
Jordan	4,509	4,668	4,700	4,674	4,611	4,441	4,465	4,536	4,608	4,615
Kazakhstan	9,071	11,634	12,387	13,891	12,808	10,511	7,715	9,248	9,813	9,813
Kenya	1,176	1,179	1,396	1,490	1,613	1,625	1,689	1,805	1,987	2,108
Kiribati	1,609	1,878	1,957	1,887	1,845	1,742	1,846	1,960	2,022	1,987
South Korea	24,069	26,178	26,601	28,449	30,667	30,172	30,826	33,297	35,364	33,827
Kosovo	3,013	3,518	3,413	3,711	3,920	3,553	3,727	3,991	4,390	4,433
Kuwait	39,342	47,440	50,784	48,544	43,459	29,195	26,796	28,552	31,369	31,550
Kyrgyzstan	885	1,131	1,190	1,295	1,293	1,133	1,132	1,255	1,322	1,467
Laos	1,187	1,397	1,566	1,814	1,983	2,124	2,308	2,437	2,552	2,603
Latvia	11,086	12,934	13,271	14,407	15,131	13,266	13,769	15,066	17,196	17,242
Lebanon	7,695	7,914	8,500	8,253	7,661	7,797	8,088	8,656	9,240	8,798
Lesotho	1,180	1,276	1,212	1,140	1,191	1,046	1,036	1,124	1,132	1,052
Liberia	505	583	647	717	709	691	710	706	677	624
Libya	11,601	7,594	14,976	11,952	8,928	7,459	7,526	9,965	11,196	9,961
Liechtenstein	153,152	171,012	160,395	168,957	174,842	163,585	161,807	167,258	174,385	166,126
Lithuania	11,847	14,267	14,297	15,642	16,474	14,272	14,928	16,796	19,259	19,612
Luxembourg	112,049	120,527	113,953	121,423	125,200	106,710	107,948	111,211	118,135	113,830
Macau	51,139	66,117	74,216	84,871	86,342	69,481	69,724	77,013	82,524	80,967
Madagascar	493	553	539	561	549	482	489	528	536	532
Malawi	623	695	506	447	484	498	415	467	501	544
Malaysia	9,047	10,398	10,807	10,852	11,165	9,663	9,523	9,965	11,080	11,228
Maldives	8,087	8,078	8,720	9,766	10,787	11,839	12,436	13,374	14,762	15,374
Mali	780	939	874	902	949	839	874	925	999	974
Malta	21,990	23,585	23,029	25,618	27,773	25,847	26,738	30,817	34,035	33,145
Marshall Islands	3,043	3,241	3,438	3,596	3,652	3,681	4,144	4,548	4,851	5,275
Mauritania	1,716	2,013	1,946	2,072	1,827	1,668	1,691	1,759	1,882	1,945
Mauritius	8,108	9,321	9,449	9,805	10,417	9,559	10,024	10,911	11,724	11,489
Mexico	9,633	10,554	10,631	11,099	11,272	9,915	9,000	9,543	9,971	10,251
Federated States of Micronesia	2,835	3,043	3,247	3,200	3,285	3,316	3,551	4,006	4,494	4,614
Moldova	2,428	2,930	3,031	3,307	3,277	2,734	2,826	3,423	4,121	4,372
Mongolia	2,602	3,702	4,281	4,294	4,081	3,800	3,575	3,613	4,078	4,309
Montenegro	6,684	7,264	6,557	7,103	7,344	6,422	6,966	7,672	8,678	8,750
Morocco	3,135	3,367	3,225	3,464	3,520	3,236	3,235	3,401	3,616	3,623
Mozambique	485	604	671	673	684	599	434	463	510	512
Myanmar	771	1,077	1,171	1,247	1,290	1,161	1,220	1,273	1,291	1,430
Namibia	5,390	5,842	6,009	5,473	5,449	4,888	4,455	5,211	5,381	4,798
Nauru	4,937	6,793	9,873	8,482	9,050	6,977	8,926	9,626	11,427	10,793
Nepal	668	790	788	803	821	876	877	1,034	1,179	1,203
Netherlands	51,473	54,815	50,580	52,681	53,584	45,905	46,937	49,640	54,138	53,755
New Zealand	33,481	38,108	39,748	42,103	44,271	38,171	39,427	42,274	42,729	42,352
Nicaragua	1,506	1,630	1,735	1,790	1,917	2,037	2,100	2,156	2,016	1,948
Niger	476	511	529	552	563	484	498	518	571	554
Nigeria	3,161	3,451	3,734	4,059	4,363	3,651	2,918	2,642	2,898	3,190
North Macedonia	4,837	5,419	5,053	5,629	5,933	5,264	5,605	5,971	6,720	6,720
Norway	89,674	103,130	104,222	105,985	100,036	76,971	72,976	78,573	85,386	79,198
Oman	21,678	23,519	24,129	23,328	23,220	18,925	17,020	17,732	19,885	19,069
Pakistan	1,138	1,302	1,378	1,391	1,424	1,535	1,567	1,653	1,698	1,501
Palau	10,173	10,978	12,320	12,917	13,954	16,037	17,183	16,434	16,342	15,993
Panama	8,256	9,584	10,982	12,192	13,142	14,028	14,803	15,697	16,187	16,540
Papua New Guinea	2,129	2,472	2,853	2,776	2,954	2,695	2,510	2,680	2,769	2,770
Paraguay	4,786	5,907	5,784	6,658	6,894	6,125	6,046	6,469	6,609	6,172
Peru	5,202	5,908	6,639	6,870	6,877	6,453	6,535	7,106	7,273	7,353
Philippines	2,237	2,473	2,721	2,903	2,996	3,039	3,108	3,153	3,280	3,512
Poland	12,574	13,868	13,087	13,614	14,263	12,623	12,455	13,918	15,658	15,869
Portugal	22,570	23,205	20,574	21,642	22,087	19,174	19,915	21,352	23,436	23,192
Puerto Rico	26,415	27,170	27,742	28,212	28,576	29,242	29,978	30,329	30,680	31,830
Qatar	69,796	96,828	101,933	99,180	93,054	66,347	57,965	59,128	66,422	63,008
Romania	8,393	9,547	8,919	9,482	10,026	8,952	9,379	10,717	12,388	12,880
Russia	11,346	14,208	15,188	15,825	14,137	9,337	8,785	10,775	11,289	11,572
Rwanda	605	667	721	718	739	750	745	776	798	850
Samoa	3,659	3,974	4,093	4,188	4,146	4,253	4,320	4,491	4,422	4,558
San Marino	60,426	57,513	50,336	51,987	51,235	43,069	44,309	45,888	49,477	48,044
São Tomé and Príncipe	1,049	1,229	1,220	1,393	1,500	1,307	1,443	1,571	1,841	1,950
Saudi Arabia	22,028	27,127	28,733	27,865	27,805	23,256	22,268	23,929	29,360	29,567
Senegal	1,273	1,367	1,319	1,373	1,397	1,219	1,270	1,361	1,459	1,436
Serbia	5,907	7,085	6,264	7,040	6,887	5,820	5,982	6,548	7,560	7,756
Seychelles										
Sierra Leone	671	751	877	1,003	948	959	838	789	846	843
Singapore	47,237	53,891	55,548	56,967	57,565	55,646	57,204	61,436	67,033	66,069
Slovakia	16,916	18,487	17,539	18,322	18,785	16,451	16,645	17,652	19,595	19,421
Slovenia	23,367	24,968	22,475	23,250	24,030	20,706	21,451	23,300	25,988	25,910
Solomon Islands	1,583	1,824	1,978	2,090	2,116	2,021	2,081	2,165	2,325	2,278
Somalia			438	482	515	532	559	607	563	607
South Africa	8,118	8,785	8,186	7,432	6,952	6,223	5,721	6,647	6,956	6,583
South Sudan		1,685	1,047	1,339	1,300	1,358	261	267	253	388
Spain	30,624	31,768	28,511	29,297	29,738	25,987	26,726	28,326	30,527	29,664
Sri Lanka	2,894	3,320	3,446	3,737	3,970	4,058	4,150	4,401	4,360	4,083
Saint Kitts and Nevis	16,592	17,716	17,857	18,710	20,171	19,674	20,536	21,395	21,323	21,684
Saint Lucia	8,657	9,111	9,255	9,580	10,051	10,336	10,638	11,341	11,640	11,764
Saint Vincent and the Grenadines	6,613	6,545	6,686	6,988	7,028	7,155	7,390	7,643	8,002	8,232
Sudan	1,637	2,034	1,396	1,463	1,628	1,679	1,639	1,199	800	728
Suriname	8,734	8,756	9,767	9,937	9,967	9,036	5,762	6,159	6,772	6,716
Sweden	52,334	60,165	57,529	60,563	59,270	50,919	51,331	52,881	53,728	51,405
Switzerland	78,283	92,377	87,749	89,447	91,081	85,705	83,881	83,950	87,344	86,219
Syria	2,807									
Taiwan	19,181	20,839	21,256	21,945	22,844	22,753	23,071	25,102	25,889	25,993
Tajikistan	738	835	950	1,040	1,105	919	801	845	852	893
Tanzania	712	747	837	936	993	912	925	970	954	994
Thailand	4,974	5,374	5,726	6,018	5,801	5,689	5,834	6,413	7,100	7,606
Timor-Leste	823	950	1,034	1,217	1,237	1,333	1,348	1,278	1,231	1,578
Togo	751	834	814	886	922	814	843	872	943	918
Tonga	3,561	4,015	4,153	4,420	4,337	4,325	4,181	4,574	4,830	5,035
Trinidad and Tobago	17,031	19,330	20,270	21,187	21,715	19,661	17,222	17,286	17,225	16,815
Tunisia	4,292	4,421	4,297	4,369	4,459	4,015	3,848	3,619	3,628	3,529
Turkey	10,706	11,362	11,738	12,639	12,222	11,100	10,978	10,757	9,917	9,388
Turkmenistan	4,047	5,181	6,442	7,050	7,686	6,208	6,165	6,355	6,721	7,303
Tuvalu	3,131	3,774	3,606	3,612	3,601	3,434	3,864	4,355	4,623	5,378
Uganda	809	872	951	965	1,008	849	827	838	880	950
Ukraine	3,097	3,723	4,024	4,210	3,121	2,136	2,201	2,655	3,118	3,687
United Arab Emirates	44,180	50,925	52,099	52,204	51,370	43,712	41,801	43,305	46,974	45,615
United Kingdom	39,808	42,309	42,733	43,722	47,822	45,287	41,428	41,053	43,892	43,387
United States	48,586	50,008	51,737	53,364	55,264	57,007	58,180	60,293	63,165	65,561
Uruguay	12,944	15,341	16,320	18,262	18,091	16,765	16,517	18,608	18,656	17,740
Uzbekistan	1,984	2,316	2,548	2,757	2,994	3,125	3,082	2,170	1,878	2,070
Vanuatu	3,008	3,327	3,246	3,347	3,356	3,244	3,310	3,584	3,506	3,613
Venezuela	10,653	10,522	11,535	7,571	4,263	2,753	2,557	1,962	1,597	773
Vietnam	1,629	1,950	2,198	2,370	2,567	2,582	2,720	2,958	3,216	3,439
Palestine	2,406	2,712	2,889	3,123	3,159	3,084	3,326	3,407	3,353	3,443
Yemen					1,046	732	688	701	749	813
Zambia	1,451	1,625	1,710	1,821	1,708	1,296	1,239	1,483	1,464	1,259
Zimbabwe	1,399	1,616	1,851	1,992	2,050	1,998	2,036	2,115	3,602	2,605

=== 2020s ===
IMF estimates (2020s)
Country / territory	2020	2021	2022	2023	2024	2025	2026	2027	2028	2029
Afghanistan	517	356	357	416	418	450				
Albania	6,024	7,191	7,816	9,803	11,391	12,814	13,968	14,957	15,977	17,054
Algeria	3,724	4,136	4,946	5,353	5,749	5,997	6,910	6,975	6,875	6,780
Andorra	36,974	41,807	41,379	44,484	46,410	50,425	53,988	55,175	55,986	56,685
Angola	1,977	2,404	3,905	3,079	3,156	3,588	3,876	4,047	3,777	3,571
Antigua and Barbuda	14,420	16,128	18,429	20,100	20,888	21,676	22,504	23,308	24,047	24,809
Argentina	8,489	10,610	13,702	14,020	13,550	14,399	16,021	15,741	15,559	15,875
Armenia	4,267	4,674	6,539	7,973	8,456	9,496	10,662	11,045	11,739	12,584
Aruba	22,558	26,463	30,467	34,314	37,169	40,534	42,934	44,957	46,772	48,394
Australia	53,319	64,411	65,778	64,849	65,685	66,379	75,172	78,039	80,039	82,164
Austria	48,764	53,827	52,749	56,764	58,373	63,180	67,020	69,579	71,622	73,506
Azerbaijan	4,280	5,468	7,831	7,152	7,262	7,322	8,497	8,641	8,763	9,041
Bahamas	26,579	30,587	34,827	38,114	39,306	41,728	43,858	45,473	46,826	47,988
Bahrain	24,343	27,148	30,471	29,290	29,717	30,541	28,147	31,511	32,538	33,219
Bangladesh	2,270	2,498	2,731	2,652	2,619	2,636	2,886	3,219	3,345	3,334
Barbados	18,768	20,611	23,799	24,877	26,076	27,246	28,245	29,680	30,978	32,339
Belarus	6,537	7,332	7,990	7,822	8,634	10,575	11,963	12,238	12,961	13,897
Belgium	45,934	51,833	50,952	55,435	56,764	61,014	64,774	66,699	68,322	70,180
Belize	5,209	6,081	7,162	7,552	7,796	7,954	8,078	8,211	8,302	8,395
Benin	1,199	1,320	1,267	1,395	1,486	1,661	1,799	1,904	2,009	2,123
Bhutan	3,370	3,392	3,683	3,726	3,989	4,439	4,933	5,531	6,095	6,761
Bolivia	3,607	4,040	4,250	4,306	4,453	5,185	4,223			
Bosnia and Herzegovina	5,811	6,805	7,078	7,969	8,607	9,750	10,845	11,637	12,359	13,090
Botswana	6,311	7,808	8,329	7,826	7,693	7,802	8,563	9,050	9,459	10,269
Brazil	7,057	7,952	9,256	10,350	10,282	10,683	12,397	13,016	13,457	14,146
Brunei	27,179	31,785	37,459	33,514	33,665	32,634	40,613	38,861	37,423	37,138
Bulgaria	10,207	12,347	14,069	15,862	17,610	20,399	23,000	25,190	27,157	28,840
Burkina Faso	830	896	829	874	982	1,150	1,316	1,378	1,420	1,484
Burundi	245	259	295	314	343	469	510	551	568	585
Cape Verde	3,647	4,072	4,445	4,913	5,306	5,961	6,556	7,011	7,451	7,931
Cambodia	2,063	2,131	2,294	2,434	2,613	2,838	3,001	3,164	3,361	3,587
Cameroon	1,558	1,673	1,608	1,721	1,830	1,980	2,115	2,211	2,307	2,427
Canada	43,573	52,908	56,609	55,002	55,209	55,796	60,105	63,354	66,127	68,621
Central African Republic	721	762	715	767	774	841	891	919	947	979
Chad	902	1,004	1,037	1,040	1,120	1,158	1,295	1,345	1,371	1,425
Chile	13,211	16,275	15,379	17,003	16,539	17,837	19,961	20,415	21,158	21,905
China	10,625	12,880	12,996	13,029	13,441	13,970	15,371	16,402	17,372	18,443
Colombia	5,363	6,231	6,688	7,027	7,980	8,617	10,726	11,817	12,282	12,788
Comoros	1,511	1,549	1,439	1,527	1,621	1,768	1,859	1,924	1,981	2,033
Democratic Republic of the Congo	514	630	727	699	743	872	1,111	1,151	1,185	1,225
Republic of the Congo	1,877	2,344	2,602	2,418	2,406	2,378	2,867	2,767	2,694	2,708
Costa Rica	12,244	12,661	13,576	16,582	18,165	19,162	21,282	22,779	23,838	24,929
Ivory Coast	2,209	2,478	2,351	2,598	2,724	3,037	3,264	3,432	3,614	3,828
Croatia	14,797	17,801	18,479	22,189	24,044	27,106	29,860	31,424	32,897	34,294
Cyprus	28,296	33,235	33,603	36,968	38,933	41,916	44,477	46,566	48,592	50,714
Czech Republic	23,464	27,668	27,876	31,801	31,784	36,288	39,614	41,514	43,371	45,123
Denmark	61,076	69,539	68,123	68,046	72,642	78,587	82,714	85,536	88,048	91,091
Djibouti	3,182	3,385	3,506	3,786	3,981	4,251	4,556	4,842	5,103	5,383
Dominica	6,872	7,530	8,193	8,853	9,204	9,895	10,428	10,788	11,271	11,739
Dominican Republic	7,525	9,023	10,715	11,280	11,542	11,749	13,245	14,348	15,229	16,110
Ecuador	5,470	6,085	6,556	6,773	6,891	7,199	7,575	7,839	8,103	8,390
Egypt	3,802	4,146	4,587	3,744	3,594	3,379	4,024	4,331	4,502	4,842
El Salvador	3,997	4,643	5,075	5,320	5,503	5,751	6,124	6,453	6,736	7,039
Equatorial Guinea	7,046	8,416	9,155	8,123	8,336	7,850	8,484	7,983	7,745	7,718
Eritrea	567									
Estonia	23,916	27,970	28,474	30,118	31,447	34,636	37,310	39,490	41,267	43,173
Eswatini	3,468	3,984	3,894	3,755	3,907	4,148	4,775	5,009	5,191	5,371
Ethiopia	1,080	1,092	1,218	1,549	1,937	1,142	1,131	1,277	1,428	1,604
Fiji	4,693	4,589	5,460	5,983	6,501	6,708	7,034	7,334	7,638	7,973
Finland	48,827	53,204	50,463	53,017	53,322	56,753	60,156	61,984	63,718	65,588
France	39,231	43,848	41,096	44,807	46,298	49,129	51,448	52,681	54,012	55,517
Gabon	7,289	9,114	9,478	9,079	9,258	9,491	11,034	10,948	10,801	10,862
Gambia	717	791	805	858	895	974	1,030	1,087	1,150	1,204
Georgia	4,308	5,055	6,774	8,237	8,701	9,705	11,234	12,538	13,694	14,975
Germany	48,328	53,595	51,215	55,256	56,838	61,255	65,699	68,093	70,148	72,296
Ghana	2,195	2,445	2,230	2,384	2,419	3,271	3,604	3,623	3,693	3,840
Greece	18,017	20,696	20,854	23,363	24,688	27,041	29,413	30,989	32,133	33,342
Grenada	9,223	9,864	10,698	11,619	12,056	12,648	13,298	13,863	14,467	15,079
Guatemala	4,478	4,912	5,357	5,754	6,150	6,599	6,980	7,444	7,916	8,423
Guinea	1,680	1,756	2,048	2,349	2,487	2,675	2,797	3,011	3,304	3,584
Guinea-Bissau	839	928	908	1,035	1,105	1,315	1,429	1,509	1,583	1,665
Guyana	6,363	9,201	16,425	18,428	25,797	26,104	38,572	40,806	41,621	42,637
Haiti	1,235	1,765	1,643	1,603	2,041	2,557	3,095	3,611	3,994	4,107
Honduras	2,307	2,735	3,003	3,227	3,417	3,598	3,663	3,830	4,007	4,178
Hong Kong	46,446	49,849	47,998	50,580	54,439	56,876	60,322	62,878	64,980	67,616
Hungary	16,356	18,991	18,500	22,198	23,266	25,850	27,884	29,260	30,690	32,308
Iceland	62,237	73,221	79,953	84,376	86,452	98,783	107,464	112,036	114,250	117,594
India	1,866	2,186	2,285	2,442	2,591	2,670	2,750	3,036	3,327	3,662
Indonesia	3,919	4,351	4,784	4,920	4,958	5,078	5,153	5,550	6,035	6,490
Iran	2,493	3,656	4,761	4,940	4,834	4,263	3,548	3,574	3,634	3,718
Iraq	4,547	5,117	6,818	6,251	6,388	5,803	5,258	5,982	6,280	6,343
Ireland	85,987	103,630	105,229	105,704	112,191	123,789	127,837	133,763	138,526	143,002
Israel	44,404	51,892	54,474	51,649	54,291	60,899	72,441	76,153	78,603	80,978
Italy	31,957	36,813	35,672	39,282	40,405	43,270	45,886	47,145	48,202	49,355
Jamaica	5,509	5,832	6,820	7,755	7,965	8,206	8,674	8,923	9,237	9,539
Japan	41,234	41,652	35,542	35,261	33,963	36,119	35,400	36,620	38,305	39,561
Jordan	4,442	4,592	4,742	4,880	5,003	5,169	5,598	5,796	6,004	6,223
Kazakhstan	9,122	10,374	11,484	13,158	14,459	15,006	19,311	20,814	21,669	22,787
Kenya	2,068	2,209	2,266	2,099	2,276	2,548	2,785	2,941	3,031	3,147
Kiribati	1,855	2,354	2,202	2,326	2,695	2,701	3,058	3,147	3,196	3,263
South Korea	33,653	37,549	34,888	35,658	36,343	36,408	43,512	49,277	52,100	54,604
Kosovo	4,298	5,309	5,320	6,531	7,063	7,796	8,902	9,782	10,535	11,287
Kuwait	25,611	33,825	38,289	33,679	32,963	31,573	28,928	33,852	35,305	35,135
Kyrgyzstan	1,271	1,391	1,806	2,191	2,568	3,131	3,620	3,988	4,310	4,593
Laos	2,529	2,496	2,022	1,979	1,963	2,171	2,331	2,464	2,580	2,690
Latvia	17,484	20,182	20,276	22,579	23,416	26,116	28,630	30,423	32,019	33,654
Lebanon	4,120	3,467	4,049	4,490	5,248	5,897				
Lesotho	936	1,080	995	963	1,075	1,170	1,298	1,332	1,373	1,417
Liberia	590	667	740	799	851	910	976	1,023	1,069	1,120
Libya	6,656	4,936	5,991	6,017	6,686	5,998	7,557	7,323	6,683	6,397
Liechtenstein	163,998	201,298	187,183	205,907	207,034	218,978	230,417	233,421	240,346	248,045
Lithuania	20,407	23,894	24,963	27,996	29,596	32,916	36,135	38,076	40,439	42,384
Luxembourg	117,571	136,190	125,295	134,403	138,757	148,247	155,733	158,868	161,810	165,209
Macau	37,008	44,839	37,053	66,735	71,869	74,465	77,049	80,712	84,164	87,495
Madagascar	477	509	530	539	575	619	649	684	735	788
Malawi	568	581	567	591	504	627	740	785	789	828
Malaysia	10,400	11,474	12,490	12,107	12,625	13,965	15,981	17,044	18,043	19,099
Maldives	9,803	13,632	15,782	16,637	17,454	18,886	19,507	20,416	21,271	22,192
Mali	957	1,030	981	1,045	1,096	1,238	1,343	1,409	1,466	1,525
Malta	31,837	38,301	36,525	41,732	44,322	48,505	52,149	54,308	56,492	58,977
Marshall Islands	5,502	6,159	6,247	6,553	7,289	7,894	9,085	10,065	10,796	11,447
Mauritania	2,041	2,152	2,207	2,421	2,416	2,723	3,015	3,059	3,180	3,287
Mauritius	9,083	9,146	10,317	11,273	11,994	12,935	13,671	14,689	15,581	16,464
Mexico	8,744	10,207	11,288	13,686	13,870	13,759	16,191	17,095	17,789	18,501
Federated States of Micronesia	4,478	4,834	5,272	5,839	6,386	6,699	7,010	7,454	7,663	7,896
Moldova	4,361	5,214	5,662	6,705	7,514	8,542	9,497	10,391	11,369	12,540
Mongolia	3,954	4,470	4,945	5,780	6,694	7,060	8,570	9,196	9,396	9,882
Montenegro	7,549	9,322	10,046	12,262	13,259	14,784	16,211	17,208	18,100	19,038
Morocco	3,375	3,911	3,579	3,961	4,346	4,878	5,141	5,408	5,768	6,186
Mozambique	457	504	573	617	654	659	673	692	706	725
Myanmar	1,453	1,035	1,254	1,234	1,408	1,501	1,507	1,542	1,650	1,791
Namibia	3,938	4,477	4,407	4,274	4,549	4,924	5,742	6,127	6,308	6,514
Nauru	10,722	12,762	15,301	13,588	14,026	14,584	16,076	17,458	18,006	18,576
Nepal	1,154	1,253	1,386	1,382	1,460	1,536	1,540	1,576	1,743	1,915
Netherlands	53,529	60,380	59,541	63,769	67,256	73,264	78,535	81,245	83,740	86,061
New Zealand	41,589	49,079	48,149	48,788	48,976	48,749	51,043	53,636	55,700	57,760
Nicaragua	1,930	2,132	2,346	2,673	2,955	3,337	3,732	4,197	4,419	4,653
Niger	569	594	593	626	703	730	774	810	841	876
Nigeria	2,798	2,789	2,893	2,139	1,084	1,223	1,594	1,889	1,918	1,979
North Macedonia	6,673	7,625	7,619	8,679	9,293	10,546	11,762	12,689	13,606	14,483
Norway	70,990	96,321	112,748	90,755	89,684	94,360	115,188	113,474	112,870	112,166
Oman	17,076	19,459	22,265	20,553	20,529	20,619	22,425	22,801	22,156	22,319
Pakistan	1,377	1,566	1,651	1,454	1,576	1,697	1,836			
Palau	14,697	13,395	14,056	15,624	18,074	20,041	21,308	22,737	23,921	25,052
Panama	13,336	15,538	17,400	18,822	19,187	19,814	20,877	21,960	23,148	24,437
Papua New Guinea	2,602	2,777	3,281	3,104	3,020	3,183	3,418	3,484	3,572	3,651
Paraguay	5,713	6,392	6,658	6,819	7,020	7,679	9,907	10,721	11,239	11,801
Peru	6,407	6,923	7,432	8,084	8,669	9,938	11,498	11,783	12,269	12,720
Philippines	3,313	3,580	3,645	3,905	4,090	4,278	4,360	4,690	5,026	5,396
Poland	15,963	18,592	18,860	22,119	25,168	28,510	31,186	33,274	35,261	37,357
Portugal	22,093	24,619	24,559	27,643	29,319	32,064	34,815	36,618	38,176	39,787
Puerto Rico	31,427	32,619	35,354	36,981	39,344	40,620	41,851	43,808	45,204	46,664
Qatar	50,962	65,401	80,385	70,946	69,492	67,894	63,634	76,453	82,233	85,950
Romania	12,984	14,857	15,538	18,254	20,199	22,543	24,741	26,403	28,347	30,050
Russia	10,167	12,541	15,774	13,990	15,094	17,864	19,953	18,701	18,493	18,419
Rwanda	828	868	1,038	1,097	1,090	1,156	1,290	1,364	1,426	1,495
Samoa	4,303	4,204	4,303	5,008	5,585	6,063	6,303	6,644	6,953	7,300
San Marino	45,641	54,733	53,876	59,415	60,964	65,621	70,662	72,545	74,210	76,161
São Tomé and Príncipe	2,188	2,381	2,412	3,014	3,529	4,084	4,582	4,997	5,365	5,711
Saudi Arabia	24,318	31,921	38,510	36,157	35,528	35,370	36,577	38,111	38,618	39,351
Senegal	1,467	1,601	1,575	1,690	1,724	1,934				
Serbia	8,099	9,632	10,025	12,282	13,678	15,284	17,126	18,684	20,021	21,514
Seychelles			16,682	18,130	18,365	19,007	19,157	19,972	20,711	21,569
Sierra Leone	844	885	860	757	805	874	946	962	992	1,018
Singapore	61,773	80,885	91,228	86,383	94,897	99,365	109,117	114,543	118,997	123,789
Slovakia	19,723	22,087	21,323	24,613	25,972	28,498	30,884	32,483	34,294	36,050
Slovenia	25,451	29,200	28,459	32,759	34,377	37,720	41,631	43,481	45,262	47,098
Solomon Islands	2,119	2,107	1,945	1,959	2,022	2,166	2,295	2,412	2,523	2,626
Somalia	589	630	660	705	748	780	850	893	951	1,012
South Africa	5,631	6,924	6,640	6,133	6,365	6,769	7,659	8,009	8,213	8,408
South Sudan	507	547	683	659	386	454	642	683	659	653
Spain	27,188	30,792	30,155	33,286	35,209	38,595	41,756	43,508	45,033	46,416
Sri Lanka	3,846	3,999	3,363	3,816	4,545	5,004	5,062	5,149	5,417	5,701
Saint Kitts and Nevis	17,155	16,562	18,760	20,154	20,427	20,897	22,237	23,493	24,641	25,811
Saint Lucia	8,537	10,481	12,976	13,617	14,440	14,632	15,091	15,647	16,191	16,742
Saint Vincent and the Grenadines	7,803	8,022	8,748	9,433	10,138	10,866	11,404	11,969	12,524	13,105
Sudan	794	772	717	701	551	724	597	512	548	589
Suriname	4,782	5,028	6,057	5,434	6,599	7,212	8,965	9,621	12,813	18,403
Sweden	52,438	60,436	54,656	54,872	57,585	63,368	69,244	70,894	74,100	76,760
Switzerland	87,811	96,900	98,210	105,725	109,132	117,191	124,478	126,606	131,519	135,633
Syria	2,807									
Taiwan	28,728	33,239	32,909	32,339	34,252	39,512	43,951	47,414	50,685	53,762
Tajikistan	858	925	1,089	1,223	1,416	1,693	2,005	2,154	2,280	2,412
Tanzania	1,039	1,082	1,146	1,176	1,156	1,270	1,325	1,394	1,493	1,600
Thailand	6,983	7,055	6,910	7,211	7,387	8,057	8,372	8,367	8,622	8,996
Timor-Leste	1,646	2,708	2,356	1,511	1,341	1,464	1,520	1,602	1,684	1,765
Togo	963	1,074	1,065	1,170	1,252	1,371	1,480	1,558	1,634	1,717
Tonga	5,108	5,197	5,535	6,010	6,510	6,972	7,343	7,847	8,108	8,359
Trinidad and Tobago	14,911	17,217	20,031	17,700	18,154	18,068	18,603	19,159	19,852	20,423
Tunisia	3,549	3,885	3,680	3,980	4,183	4,637	5,053	5,038	5,105	5,173
Turkey	8,759	9,836	10,882	13,516	15,914	18,676	21,079	22,513	23,824	25,015
Turkmenistan	7,272	7,802	8,813	9,640	10,408	11,587	12,291	13,251	13,793	14,437
Tuvalu	5,425	6,336	5,363	5,761	6,518	7,125	8,367	8,857	9,193	9,539
Uganda	919	1,008	1,079	1,151	1,223	1,384	1,453	1,548	1,648	1,756
Ukraine	3,781	4,873	4,695	5,322	5,713	6,519	7,075	7,463	7,732	7,974
United Arab Emirates	38,449	42,840	49,704	48,941	51,439	54,151	57,109	59,499	61,924	65,063
United Kingdom	40,979	47,917	47,386	50,197	53,602	57,741	61,108	64,030	66,770	69,784
United States	64,518	71,426	77,964	82,579	86,417	90,267	95,212	100,208	104,104	107,770
Uruguay	15,257	17,314	20,347	22,656	23,576	24,549	27,339	28,923	29,940	31,147
Uzbekistan	2,029	2,301	2,618	2,922	3,232	3,846	4,575	5,109	5,606	6,089
Vanuatu	3,779	3,473	3,618	3,751	3,871	3,907	4,052	4,191	4,315	4,425
Venezuela	704	1,386	2,819	2,712	3,651	3,559	4,355	4,581		
Vietnam	3,549	3,757	4,133	4,316	4,536	4,829	5,259	5,659	6,115	6,609
Palestine	3,045	3,464	3,579	3,398	2,853	2,992				
Yemen	663	611	646	528	442	418	567	535	513	496
Zambia	952	1,127	1,447	1,331	1,187	1,310	1,882	1,970	2,046	2,240
Zimbabwe	2,565	3,296	2,993	2,669	2,899	3,358	3,718	3,828	3,842	3,824

=== 2030s ===
IMF estimates (2030s)
Country / territory	2030	2031
Afghanistan	450	
Albania	18,217	19,465
Algeria	6,744	6,780
Andorra	57,344	57,480
Angola	3,593	3,647
Antigua and Barbuda	25,596	26,410
Argentina	16,476	16,974
Armenia	13,502	14,485
Aruba	49,975	51,619
Australia	84,573	87,131
Austria	75,390	77,065
Azerbaijan	9,382	9,756
Bahamas	49,179	50,784
Bahrain	33,971	34,916
Bangladesh	3,460	3,680
Barbados	33,767	35,265
Belarus	14,744	15,586
Belgium	71,973	73,636
Belize	8,490	8,585
Benin	2,246	2,380
Bhutan	7,420	8,058
Bolivia		4,223
Bosnia and Herzegovina	13,873	14,641
Botswana	11,167	11,971
Brazil	14,880	15,657
Brunei	38,824	39,682
Bulgaria	30,686	32,422
Burkina Faso	1,552	1,616
Burundi	594	602
Cape Verde	8,450	8,973
Cambodia	3,840	4,124
Cameroon	2,551	2,651
Canada	71,069	73,696
Central African Republic	1,014	1,047
Chad	1,491	1,557
Chile	22,772	23,676
China	19,524	20,650
Colombia	13,342	13,931
Comoros	2,089	2,139
Democratic Republic of the Congo	1,267	1,310
Republic of the Congo	2,743	2,798
Costa Rica	26,046	27,265
Ivory Coast	4,054	4,282
Croatia	35,776	37,232
Cyprus	52,926	55,112
Czech Republic	46,936	48,634
Denmark	94,198	97,385
Djibouti	5,690	6,015
Dominica	12,180	12,634
Dominican Republic	17,058	18,105
Ecuador	8,706	9,036
Egypt	5,094	5,315
El Salvador	7,352	7,682
Equatorial Guinea	7,803	7,855
Eritrea	567	
Estonia	45,121	47,019
Eswatini	5,572	5,787
Ethiopia	1,796	2,022
Fiji	8,337	8,957
Finland	67,946	70,110
France	57,083	58,480
Gabon	10,977	11,085
Gambia	1,267	1,340
Georgia	16,384	17,923
Germany	74,395	76,306
Ghana	4,028	4,227
Greece	34,633	36,051
Grenada	15,716	16,380
Guatemala	8,980	9,581
Guinea	3,858	4,133
Guinea-Bissau	1,753	1,827
Guyana	43,860	45,098
Haiti	4,170	4,377
Honduras	4,358	4,547
Hong Kong	70,446	73,503
Hungary	34,084	35,832
Iceland	120,653	123,777
India	4,019	4,389
Indonesia	6,944	7,433
Iran	3,821	3,925
Iraq	6,463	6,592
Ireland	147,862	152,079
Israel	83,398	85,869
Italy	50,582	51,693
Jamaica	9,858	10,187
Japan	40,693	41,953
Jordan	6,460	6,708
Kazakhstan	24,157	25,539
Kenya	3,295	3,460
Kiribati	3,330	3,391
South Korea	57,112	59,919
Kosovo	12,040	12,771
Kuwait	35,173	35,292
Kyrgyzstan	4,770	4,880
Laos	2,794	2,902
Latvia	35,296	36,887
Lebanon	5,897	
Lesotho	1,463	1,508
Liberia	1,178	1,243
Libya	6,142	5,879
Liechtenstein	255,990	264,026
Lithuania	44,548	46,719
Luxembourg	168,681	171,677
Macau	91,182	93,654
Madagascar	842	896
Malawi	859	877
Malaysia	20,196	21,320
Maldives	23,153	24,162
Mali	1,587	1,647
Malta	61,728	64,744
Marshall Islands	12,031	12,646
Mauritania	3,322	3,351
Mauritius	17,412	18,424
Mexico	19,230	20,014
Federated States of Micronesia	8,130	8,348
Moldova	13,827	15,324
Mongolia	10,467	11,106
Montenegro	20,010	20,976
Morocco	6,632	7,100
Mozambique	794	894
Myanmar	1,842	1,895
Namibia	6,713	6,918
Nauru	19,125	19,703
Nepal	2,107	2,311
Netherlands	88,396	90,517
New Zealand	59,793	61,937
Nicaragua	4,900	5,171
Niger	914	951
Nigeria	2,057	2,148
North Macedonia	15,320	16,116
Norway	111,915	111,995
Oman	22,623	22,905
Pakistan	1,836	
Palau	26,179	27,363
Panama	25,760	27,139
Papua New Guinea	3,749	3,888
Paraguay	12,394	13,022
Peru	13,190	13,744
Philippines	5,793	6,216
Poland	39,491	41,697
Portugal	41,420	42,961
Puerto Rico	48,220	49,855
Qatar	89,884	92,725
Romania	31,892	33,704
Russia	18,509	18,671
Rwanda	1,570	1,665
Samoa	7,611	7,935
San Marino	78,170	80,235
São Tomé and Príncipe	6,080	6,475
Saudi Arabia	40,276	41,320
Senegal	1,934	
Serbia	23,100	24,834
Seychelles	22,417	23,158
Sierra Leone	1,046	1,077
Singapore	128,682	133,693
Slovakia	37,693	39,146
Slovenia	49,150	51,101
Solomon Islands	2,737	2,854
Somalia	1,070	1,135
South Africa	8,619	8,836
South Sudan	655	655
Spain	47,947	49,410
Sri Lanka	6,000	6,314
Saint Kitts and Nevis	27,000	28,228
Saint Lucia	17,298	17,870
Saint Vincent and the Grenadines	13,713	14,349
Sudan	628	685
Suriname	18,546	18,702
Sweden	79,614	82,527
Switzerland	140,712	145,009
Syria	2,807	
Taiwan	57,151	60,048
Tajikistan	2,558	2,740
Tanzania	1,712	1,853
Thailand	9,399	9,837
Timor-Leste	1,848	1,933
Togo	1,808	1,903
Tonga	8,676	9,029
Trinidad and Tobago	20,904	21,364
Tunisia	5,284	5,491
Turkey	26,281	27,578
Turkmenistan	15,238	16,110
Tuvalu	9,886	10,223
Uganda	1,858	1,953
Ukraine	8,404	8,970
United Arab Emirates	67,570	70,216
United Kingdom	72,977	76,309
United States	111,371	114,955
Uruguay	32,622	34,185
Uzbekistan	6,592	7,126
Vanuatu	4,537	4,648
Venezuela	4,581	
Vietnam	7,105	7,609
Palestine	2,992	
Yemen	484	475
Zambia	2,362	2,491
Zimbabwe	3,805	3,786

== CIA estimates in 1990 ==
GDP (Nominal) per Capita data in 1990, with some countries only GNP (Nominal) was provided by the CIA World Factbook.

Country / territory	GDP per capita (1990)
Bermuda	$23,000
United States	$21,082
Canada	$19,600
Norway	$17,900
Switzerland	$17,800
Luxembourg	$17,200
Qatar	$17,070
Iceland	$16,200
Sweden	$15,700
Japan	$15,600
Germany	$15,300
Finland	$15,000
France	$14,600
Denmark	$14,300
United Kingdom	$14,300
Australia	$14,300
Italy	$14,000
Faroe Islands	$14,000
Netherlands	$13,900
Belgium	$13,700
Austria	$13,600
United Arab Emirates	$11,680
New Zealand	$11,600
Kuwait	$10,500
Singapore	$10,300
Spain	$10,100
Aruba	$10,000
Hong Kong	$10,000
Nauru	$10,000
Cayman Islands	$10,000
Bahamas	$9,875
East Germany	$9,679
Brunei	$9,600
Soviet Union	$9,211
Northern Mariana Islands	$9,170
U.S. Virgin Islands	$9,030
Greenland	$9,000
British Virgin Islands	$8,900
Ireland	$8,900
Israel	$8,700
Czechoslovakia	$7,878
Guam	$7,675
Isle of Man	$7,573
Bahrain	$7,550
Portugal	$6,900
French Polynesia	$6,400
Macau	$6,300
Hungary	$6,108
Cyprus	$6,100
Oman	$6,006
Taiwan	$6,000
New Caledonia	$5,810
Bulgaria	$5,710
Greece	$5,605
Puerto Rico	$5,574
Antigua and Barbuda	$5,550
Netherlands Antilles	$5,500
Yugoslavia	$5,464
Libya	$5,410
Barbados	$5,250
American Samoa	$5,210
Malta	$5,100
Turks and Caicos Islands	$5,000
Saudi Arabia	$4,720
South Korea	$4,600
Poland	$4,565
Gibraltar	$4,450
Réunion	$4,290
Montserrat	$3,780
Seychelles	$3,720
Martinique	$3,650
Romania	$3,445
Anguilla	$3,350
Guadeloupe	$3,300
Saint Kitts and Nevis	$3,240
French Guiana	$3,230
Suriname	$3,215
Gabon	$3,200
Trinidad and Tobago	$3,070
Uruguay	$2,950
Venezuela	$2,700
Brazil	$2,500
South Africa	$2,380
Malaysia	$2,270
Trust Territory of the Pacific Islands	$2,260
Algeria	$2,235
Argentina	$2,217
Cook Islands	$2,200
Mexico	$2,165
Cuba	$2,000
Chile	$1,970
Paraguay	$1,970
Iraq	$1,940
Mauritius	$1,910
Iran	$1,800
Jordan	$1,760
Fiji	$1,750
Panama	$1,648
Costa Rica	$1,630
Botswana	$1,600
Syria	$1,540
Grenada	$1,535
Jamaica	$1,529
Federated States of Micronesia	$1,500
Marshall Islands	$1,500
Dominica	$1,408
Turkey	$1,350
Saint Vincent and the Grenadines	$1,305
Belize	$1,285
Saint Lucia	$1,258
Namibia	$1,245
North Korea	$1,240
Albania	$1,200
Guatemala	$1,185
Thailand	$1,160
Colombia	$1,110
Tunisia	$1,105
Djibouti	$1,070
El Salvador	$1,020
Congo	$1,000
Niue	$1,000
Palestine	$1,000
Cameroon	$955
Ecuador	$935
Ivory Coast	$900
Papua New Guinea	$890
Honduras	$890
Morocco	$880
Mongolia	$880
Peru	$880
Tonga	$850
Vanuatu	$820
Yemen Arab Republic	$820
Tokelau	$800
Dominican Republic	$790
Swaziland	$750
Egypt	$700
Lebanon	$700
Senegal	$680
Maldives	$670
Bolivia	$660
Gaza Strip	$650
Philippines	$625
Western Samoa	$615
Angola	$600
Tuvalu	$530
Zambia	$530
Mauritania	$520
Kiribati	$500
Solomon Islands	$500
South Yemen	$495
Cape Verde	$494
Wallis and Futuna	$484
Comoros	$475
Nicaragua	$470
Zimbabwe	$470
Central African Republic	$453
Indonesia	$430
Guyana	$420
Pakistan	$409
Togo	$405
India	$400
Ghana	$400
Liberia	$395
Haiti	$380
China	$370
Sri Lanka	$370
Kenya	$360
Guinea	$350
São Tomé and Príncipe	$340
Sudan	$340
Benin	$335
Niger	$330
Rwanda	$325
Uganda	$300
Equatorial Guinea	$293
Burma	$280
Nigeria	$270
Burundi	$255
Gambia	$250
Sierra Leone	$250
Lesotho	$245
Tanzania	$235
Mali	$220
Vietnam	$215
Somalia	$210
Afghanistan	$200
Bhutan	$199
Zaire	$195
Chad	$190
Malawi	$180
Bangladesh	$180
Burkina Faso	$170
Guinea-Bissau	$160
Nepal	$158
Madagascar	$155
Laos	$150
Cambodia	$130
Ethiopia	$130
Mozambique	$110

GDP (nominal)
GNP (nominal)

== UN estimates ==
=== 1970s ===
The following Table is based from UN data.

Country / territory	1970	1971	1972	1973	1974	1975	1976	1977	1978	1979
Afghanistan	157	160	136	144	175	188	199	226	250	278
Albania	13	1,058	1,064	1,070	1,076	1,082	1,090	1,096	1,105	903
Algeria	354	359	467	584	816	931	1,033	1,187	1,448	1,770
Andorra	4,097	4,426	5,336	6,761	7,998	9,070	9,049	9,808	11,549	14,956
Angola	604	623	623	743	813	584	545	579	628	677
Anguilla	610	711	833	935	1,023	1,112	1,060	1,179	1,356	1,564
Antigua and Barbuda	518	620	839	1,153	1,217	1,233	1,017	1,151	1,298	1,597
Argentina	987	1,668	1,530	1,645	1,858	1,985	2,061	2,294	2,341	2,672
Aruba	2,990	3,130	3,274	3,427	3,592	3,776	3,981	4,209	4,452	4,700
Australia	3,496	3,829	4,435	6,318	7,435	7,835	8,346	8,178	9,438	10,331
Austria	908	2,362	2,906	3,875	4,608	5,239	5,616	6,743	8,127	9,698
Bahamas	3,356	3,480	3,506	3,901	4,087	4,723	5,036	5,894	6,628	7,666
Bahrain	980	2,061	2,507	3,420	4,455	4,442	6,005	7,070	7,569	8,517
Bangladesh	95	84	92	99	116	119	130	133	166	186
Barbados	904	1,011	1,150	1,394	1,656	1,935	2,088	2,362	2,631	3,175
Belgium	976	3,093	3,850	4,931	5,777	6,759	7,305	8,492	10,360	11,881
Belize	206	256	327	523	686	784	609	772	870	999
Benin	111	115	138	166	174	207	215	229	271	321
Bermuda	5,079	5,692	6,280	7,116	8,174	8,942	9,932	10,701	11,495	13,275
Bhutan	212	220	224	243	276	249	244	261	243	263
Bolivia	224	238	272	260	428	479	537	528	565	599
Botswana	96	123	155	221	297	333	348	431	494	620
Brazil	367	400	502	694	868	996	1,150	1,307	1,449	1,559
British Virgin Islands	2,023	1,717	1,765	1,971	2,330	2,537	2,747	2,827	3,263	4,023
Brunei	908	1,828	2,398	3,674	8,734	9,125	10,684	12,520	13,521	18,853
Bulgaria	19	1,041	1,211	1,435	1,553	1,364	1,441	1,469	1,586	1,064
Burkina Faso	80	80	101	114	124	145	136	161	203	267
Burundi	71	72	69	85	95	113	122	142	156	197
Cape Verde	270	301	340	420	422	491	457	426	485	514
Cambodia	110	107	103	87	88	95	102	95	106	102
Cameroon	171	187	234	310	322	412	436	496	635	820
Canada	4,100	4,556	5,107	5,840	7,028	7,512	8,813	8,920	9,112	10,020
Cayman Islands	2,578	3,080	3,872	4,749	5,203	5,830	6,537	7,337	8,261	9,355
Central African Republic	151	158	177	204	208	274	319	351	413	462
Chad	97	104	106	114	130	184	169	168	196	174
Chile	798	1,175	1,246	1,746	1,664	762	1,024	1,368	1,553	2,060
China	111	117	129	154	157	175	166	182	227	272
Colombia	462	489	531	614	721	748	856	1,062	1,240	1,457
Comoros	86	93	108	141	155	234	223	237	295	380
DR Congo	238	259	279	346	411	426	390	485	670	638
Congo	196	218	254	328	384	439	442	428	517	683
Cook Islands	478	476	498	652	780	781	759	911	1,095	1,286
Costa Rica	635	676	758	912	970	1,114	1,336	1,658	1,852	2,066
Ivory Coast	286	291	326	422	487	589	674	866	1,044	1,155
Cuba	653	780	901	1,088	1,224	1,380	1,445	1,474	1,838	2,003
Cyprus	1,004	1,162	1,397	1,681	1,818	1,571	1,832	2,337	3,045	3,961
Czechoslovakia	1,136	1,183	1,348	1,582	1,685	1,844	1,804	2,567	2,806	2,996
Denmark	3,464	3,848	4,657	6,127	6,778	7,997	8,775	9,769	11,815	13,749
Djibouti	414	441	501	588	688	699	752	726	717	785
Dominica	324	360	386	443	525	551	533	587	721	701
Dominican Republic	413	450	523	600	729	875	936	1,061	1,069	1,212
Ecuador	471	441	495	588	970	1,106	1,266	1,495	1,574	1,823
Egypt	234	243	254	259	300	328	379	474	567	369
El Salvador	92	94	98	111	128	142	177	218	229	252
Equatorial Guinea	77	81	81	108	120	156	169	194	225	255
Ethiopia	85	87	92	104	114	111	118	132	139	150
Fiji	424	465	584	769	990	1,188	1,185	1,204	1,363	1,643
Finland	2,467	2,712	3,177	4,174	5,300	6,260	6,743	7,074	7,639	9,342
France	870	3,174	3,857	4,966	5,317	6,673	6,846	7,513	9,248	11,171
French Polynesia	897	2,687	2,855	3,646	4,542	5,468	6,004	6,268	7,695	9,281
Gabon	695	803	889	1,465	3,071	4,206	5,741	5,241	4,356	5,393
Gambia	215	220	277	458	580	675	603	619	715	761
Germany	680	3,169	3,795	5,041	5,636	6,213	6,587	7,618	9,406	11,212
Ghana	413	439	373	339	384	359	358	383	437	453
Greece	899	1,654	1,906	2,511	2,830	3,160	3,412	3,908	4,714	5,727
Greenland	999	1,845	2,170	2,827	3,393	4,188	4,755	5,567	7,019	8,280
Grenada	204	258	346	428	445	551	558	634	793	923
Guatemala	313	317	327	388	464	521	607	743	801	888
Guinea	182	199	211	225	256	287	325	333	378	401
Guinea-Bissau	395	384	442	535	577	652	577	488	554	595
Guyana	614	643	643	677	936	1,087	946	923	1,025	1,061
Haiti	93	100	101	125	149	176	223	235	237	257
Honduras	306	315	337	372	409	431	502	602	674	762
Hong Kong	963	1,114	1,404	1,936	2,212	2,307	2,870	3,393	3,826	4,569
Hungary	615	666	779	961	1,050	1,192	1,374	1,526	1,775	2,042
Iceland	2,598	3,264	4,034	5,452	7,089	6,508	7,645	10,023	11,304	12,730
India	108	113	120	140	154	157	154	175	198	214
Indonesia	90	92	106	152	236	271	324	388	426	416
Iran	385	469	570	876	1,453	1,594	2,025	2,313	2,167	2,425
Iraq	238	258	251	305	347	420	518	542	665	865
Ireland	897	1,710	2,089	2,434	2,527	2,985	2,926	3,425	4,391	5,413
Israel	2,133	2,190	2,785	3,464	4,560	4,385	4,498	4,762	4,596	5,801
Italy	700	2,306	2,668	3,202	3,619	4,107	4,033	4,603	5,609	6,986
Jamaica	847	913	1,095	1,105	1,353	1,607	1,645	1,782	1,435	1,304
Japan	2,040	2,272	2,968	3,977	4,358	4,683	5,207	6,347	8,841	9,127
Jordan	358	364	389	431	483	615	772	926	1,193	1,405
Kenya	224	239	259	295	339	358	368	458	522	577
Kiribati	395	412	514	829	1,480	1,405	1,034	960	1,101	1,035
North Korea	384	413	443	477	515	558	571	587	604	622
South Korea	786	308	331	414	571	625	844	1,068	1,422	1,805
Kuwait	3,829	4,804	5,131	5,832	13,158	11,431	11,762	11,973	12,426	18,815
Laos	43	46	48	54	59	68	72	74	80	83
Lebanon	866	950	1,154	1,466	1,843	1,691	734	1,371	1,528	1,766
Lesotho	65	61	71	106	118	120	115	147	198	209
Liberia	182	187	198	225	268	312	315	342	364	406
Libya	200	2,210	2,534	3,322	5,577	5,206	6,489	7,326	6,955	9,230
Liechtenstein	4,734	5,394	6,301	8,217	9,430	11,747	12,725	13,872	19,555	22,092
Luxembourg	708	4,582	5,689	7,738	9,359	9,108	9,912	10,898	13,491	15,699
Macau	664	786	962	1,320	1,533	1,791	1,799	2,322	3,054	3,469
Madagascar	137	144	160	191	210	243	226	237	261	329
Malawi	104	127	142	133	160	173	184	214	244	254
Malaysia	354	380	440	653	790	758	877	1,019	1,240	1,571
Maldives	363	393	443	526	644	391	346	314	356	547
Mali	59	69	77	88	81	118	138	157	179	222
Malta	852	899	1,001	1,170	1,270	1,596	1,765	2,077	2,615	3,269
Marshall Islands	416	432	451	500	626	658	690	742	789	876
Mauritania	282	294	333	368	486	571	619	619	592	717
Mauritius	238	264	326	402	658	651	796	915	1,110	1,303
Mexico	850	908	1,013	1,201	1,516	1,799	1,766	1,585	1,935	2,473
Federated States of Micronesia	343	372	427	593	782	775	771	759	834	906
Monaco	12,097	13,393	16,199	20,710	22,004	27,399	27,907	30,408	37,155	44,508
Mongolia	156	166	174	194	215	243	259	288	323	356
Montserrat	670	774	894	993	1,083	1,221	1,064	1,168	1,331	1,608
Morocco	290	303	357	429	516	591	616	694	812	953
Mozambique	391	425	466	536	547	552	490	482	489	500
Myanmar	99	99	90	114	133	120	130	130	142	159
Namibia	811	879	853	1,049	1,244	1,291	1,209	1,314	1,482	1,792
Nauru	2,364	2,544	2,942	3,743	4,793	4,750	4,767	4,720	5,063	5,165
Nepal	87	87	99	90	112	121	110	107	123	137
Netherlands	930	3,359	4,079	5,337	6,253	7,300	7,900	9,158	11,122	12,654
Netherlands Antilles	1,394	1,494	1,678	1,864	2,324	2,739	3,053	3,445	4,195	4,961
New Caledonia	798	3,998	4,465	4,569	5,192	6,369	6,059	6,218	6,165	7,505
New Zealand	2,304	2,764	3,295	4,249	4,687	4,484	4,473	4,870	5,902	6,697
Nicaragua	477	492	509	613	826	838	944	1,110	1,029	715
Niger	95	99	121	125	140	173	199	228	300	382
Nigeria	426	483	574	643	1,015	1,256	1,489	1,681	1,819	2,137
Norway	3,306	3,735	4,414	5,691	6,813	8,207	8,929	10,270	11,470	13,056
Oman	371	421	495	627	2,047	2,489	2,891	2,936	2,780	3,582
Pakistan	226	234	135	140	180	220	251	279	319	341
Palau	875	946	1,021	1,103	1,196	1,305	1,430	1,574	1,743	1,922
Palestine	158	178	250	300	452	438	500	501	508	576
Panama	755	828	884	984	1,094	1,193	1,234	1,276	1,475	1,647
Papua New Guinea	448	487	566	831	914	821	860	921	1,090	1,221
Paraguay	212	232	262	331	433	479	525	630	751	976
Peru	437	474	512	597	733	871	809	711	594	739
Philippines	207	223	234	286	380	400	446	499	561	661
Poland	862	947	1,039	1,220	1,357	1,433	1,583	1,740	1,953	2,166
Portugal	935	1,056	1,276	1,691	1,934	2,107	2,183	2,271	2,457	2,754
Puerto Rico	608	2,085	2,303	2,506	2,704	2,835	3,048	3,310	3,664	4,117
Qatar	4,929	5,984	7,901	10,577	12,599	15,028	18,453	19,244	20,476	27,445
Romania	619	727	830	956	991	1,057	1,176	1,260	1,472	1,576
Rwanda	61	71	77	93	119	139	150	170	199	236
Samoa	281	328	377	494	553	549	496	570	624	705
San Marino	4,171	4,547	5,271	6,346	7,180	8,123	7,917	8,931	10,732	13,179
São Tomé and Príncipe	477	467	508	674	682	692	583	535	581	675
Saudi Arabia	921	1,179	1,514	2,232	6,446	6,296	8,158	8,943	9,136	11,998
Senegal	226	226	265	296	324	424	419	418	454	553
Seychelles	425	494	672	788	897	969	975	1,247	1,619	2,361
Sierra Leone	181	190	205	230	259	271	247	275	348	392
Singapore	925	1,075	1,371	1,929	2,360	2,559	2,649	2,892	3,439	4,092
Solomon Islands	200	208	219	282	391	335	359	392	456	584
Somalia	99	100	128	137	157	195	205	94	95	90
South Africa	829	891	911	1,215	1,487	1,498	1,402	1,520	1,706	2,055
Soviet Union	1,789	1,863	2,090	2,479	2,452	2,704	2,691	2,861	3,228	3,435
Spain	1,205	1,355	1,700	2,234	2,732	3,187	3,256	3,600	4,322	5,722
Sri Lanka	225	226	248	264	323	328	306	340	229	275
Saint Kitts and Nevis	556	674	793	836	1,088	1,153	978	1,017	1,123	1,342
Saint Lucia	327	370	419	467	628	720	730	805	928	1,109
Saint Vincent and the Grenadines	234	251	342	370	399	398	383	435	545	627
Sudan	89	94	113	140	166	200	242	275	286	305
Suriname	960	1,044	1,142	1,263	1,539	1,758	1,918	2,434	2,788	2,961
Swaziland	347	419	447	563	676	766	760	819	889	1,022
Sweden	897	5,066	5,943	7,189	7,967	9,974	10,720	11,295	12,447	14,665
Switzerland	4,044	4,677	5,692	7,604	8,723	9,976	10,436	11,171	15,671	17,658
Syria	275	313	349	361	559	702	817	864	1,002	1,165
Tanzania	179	185	204	236	275	306	321	372	432	443
Thailand	200	202	218	281	346	366	407	463	550	614
Togo	125	136	155	176	230	248	231	273	330	385
Tonga	203	226	269	395	525	481	441	495	596	633
Trinidad and Tobago	869	938	1,119	1,332	2,048	2,415	2,438	3,019	3,380	4,305
Tunisia	312	358	465	555	704	841	856	948	1,082	1,272
Turkey	703	648	794	974	1,311	1,601	1,790	1,995	2,154	2,874
Turks and Caicos Islands	1,736	1,915	2,094	2,279	2,481	2,709	2,972	3,268	3,592	3,933
Tuvalu	354	372	406	502	527	501	490	454	489	502
Uganda	151	162	171	195	230	258	264	276	275	253
United Arab Emirates	4,475	5,246	6,706	11,004	25,705	27,709	30,887	34,408	28,736	33,674
United Kingdom	890	2,655	3,039	3,436	3,673	4,303	4,138	4,679	5,974	7,809
United States	5,136	5,525	6,014	6,641	7,137	7,713	8,496	9,350	10,463	11,574
Uruguay	903	1,082	868	1,109	1,535	1,351	1,410	1,571	1,870	2,658
Vanuatu	445	467	601	710	686	804	753	765	906	1,159
Venezuela	194	1,272	1,362	1,577	2,350	2,404	2,675	2,998	3,166	3,784
Vietnam	64	68	71	72	76	80	91	106	126	134
North Yemen	85	99	141	126	150	178	190	212	226	240
South Yemen	106	95	105	84	88	87	111	133	157	164
Yugoslavia	721	776	803	1,037	1,422	1,579	1,768	2,131	2,513	3,128
Zambia	369	363	413	506	602	533	545	518	560	668
Zimbabwe	388	434	518	616	716	760	728	712	689	791

=== 1980s ===
Country / territory	1980	1981	1982	1983	1984	1985	1986	1987	1988	1989
Afghanistan	276	268	271	277	282	286	290	255	234	288
Albania	799	810	818	811	784	783	788	762	770	904
Algeria	2,185	2,219	2,192	2,294	2,413	2,564	2,707	2,690	2,385	2,191
Andorra	15,662	13,124	12,161	10,152	9,780	9,838	13,112	15,962	18,101	19,191
Angola	871	787	759	765	782	936	854	959	1,008	1,143
Anguilla	1,810	2,103	2,451	2,850	3,301	4,040	5,094	6,076	7,226	8,552
Antigua and Barbuda	1,912	2,181	2,444	2,756	3,170	3,723	4,496	5,311	6,374	7,081
Argentina	2,912	2,965	3,002	3,198	3,325	3,144	3,718	3,764	4,325	2,574
Aruba	4,941	5,163	5,370	5,578	5,817	6,107	6,473	7,886	9,765	11,392
Australia	11,770	13,537	12,696	12,546	13,258	11,506	11,903	13,907	17,325	18,964
Austria	10,775	9,334	9,369	9,479	8,932	9,107	12,982	16,249	17,404	17,313
Bahamas	7,504	8,417	8,291	7,959	8,445	9,614	10,586	11,550	12,667	14,214
Bahrain	10,459	11,358	11,575	11,545	11,753	10,669	8,629	8,464	8,970	9,308
Bangladesh	206	203	180	179	204	206	212	234	246	261
Barbados	4,058	4,451	4,637	4,910	5,337	5,569	6,096	6,690	7,090	7,813
Belgium	12,938	10,672	9,378	8,873	8,477	8,766	12,183	15,146	16,429	16,589
Belize	1,351	1,307	1,183	1,213	1,315	1,269	1,344	1,586	1,759	1,979
Benin	399	367	348	293	273	263	327	371	373	336
Bermuda	15,835	17,204	19,066	21,094	22,058	24,239	26,731	29,060	30,839	32,481
Bhutan	312	341	350	384	368	367	421	490	512	480
Bolivia	630	680	676	657	663	664	647	667	697	701
Botswana	856	943	798	837	847	708	916	1,223	1,375	2,254
Brazil	1,564	1,803	1,865	1,301	1,310	1,370	1,613	1,735	1,902	2,540
British Virgin Islands	4,923	5,234	5,951	6,444	6,780	6,754	7,021	7,993	8,591	9,826
Brunei	32,066	27,539	26,118	22,893	21,904	19,841	11,762	13,136	12,150	13,247
Bulgaria	1,223	1,399	1,516	1,626	1,737	1,840	1,957	2,131	2,454	2,477
Burkina Faso	283	256	230	205	178	203	259	294	316	308
Burundi	230	234	239	246	217	245	249	227	206	207
Cape Verde	566	546	540	521	487	499	680	829	918	912
Cambodia	107	116	120	125	131	137	140	170	199	200
Cameroon	993	905	881	892	852	813	964	1,019	967	864
Canada	11,170	12,363	12,531	13,475	13,911	14,112	14,416	16,250	18,847	20,701
Cayman Islands	10,666	12,246	14,136	19,095	20,739	21,542	22,566	25,033	28,950	31,421
Central African Republic	511	444	405	346	322	344	436	457	471	450
Chad	175	201	184	192	202	194	232	255	288	264
Chile	2,700	3,191	2,246	1,826	1,783	1,548	1,638	1,882	2,160	2,423
China	312	293	285	302	306	297	283	302	370	406
Colombia	1,702	1,813	1,897	1,844	1,782	1,590	1,560	1,590	1,681	1,662
Comoros	400	359	326	330	309	320	441	517	530	493
DR Congo	593	511	497	411	241	251	282	234	260	425
Congo	947	1,074	1,131	1,066	1,083	1,037	863	1,043	978	1,043
Cook Islands	1,448	1,507	1,508	1,482	1,529	1,592	2,052	2,617	3,344	3,386
Costa Rica	2,409	1,274	1,232	1,447	1,639	1,711	1,873	1,880	1,866	2,062
Ivory Coast	1,231	977	841	729	700	687	868	922	904	912
Cuba	2,025	2,039	2,111	2,228	2,400	2,273	2,383	2,455	2,646	2,577
Cyprus	4,750	4,527	4,643	4,589	4,767	5,011	6,329	7,501	8,563	9,015
Czechoslovakia	3,120	3,301	3,319	3,291	2,971	2,968	3,478	3,898	3,846	3,764
Denmark	13,883	12,074	11,793	11,847	11,555	12,254	17,224	21,385	22,562	21,914
Djibouti	839	853	868	859	883	872	879	840	827	790
Dominica	930	1,041	1,136	1,267	1,435	1,587	1,819	2,058	2,406	2,604
Dominican Republic	1,428	1,530	1,640	1,736	2,040	866	1,026	940	841	1,188
Ecuador	2,241	2,664	2,373	1,992	1,916	1,895	1,651	1,467	1,339	1,392
Egypt	464	303	345	404	450	482	488	525	557	596
El Salvador	256	245	250	279	316	383	521	603	704	818
Equatorial Guinea	269	240	264	274	255	282	333	388	399	341
Ethiopia	157	160	160	170	195	221	223	231	218	217
Fiji	1,897	1,901	1,789	1,641	1,684	1,606	1,799	1,634	1,538	1,734
Finland	11,233	10,933	10,947	10,511	10,847	11,406	14,952	18,562	22,033	23,966
France	12,713	11,111	10,506	10,006	9,433	9,775	13,557	16,324	17,696	17,704
French Polynesia	10,271	9,328	9,104	9,185	9,215	9,795	14,553	15,656	15,478	15,253
Gabon	7,435	6,543	5,975	5,458	5,580	5,589	5,149	4,904	4,781	5,004
Gambia	834	854	827	787	740	894	580	618	740	736
Germany	12,113	10,225	9,942	9,887	9,313	9,408	13,420	16,609	17,862	17,751
Ghana	484	497	475	455	495	519	541	565	601	591
Greece	5,909	5,394	5,588	5,031	4,867	4,826	5,669	6,578	7,613	7,864
Greenland	9,328	8,469	7,734	7,894	7,100	7,632	11,020	14,238	16,099	16,532
Grenada	996	1,050	1,129	1,157	1,226	1,368	1,536	1,794	2,009	2,227
Guatemala	987	1,050	1,035	1,046	1,067	1,228	905	741	801	839
Guinea	444	480	507	521	532	561	574	590	629	618
Guinea-Bissau	552	589	473	465	497	440	477	506	468	552
Guyana	1,199	1,150	979	991	915	963	1,096	736	898	835
Haiti	323	323	328	353	386	417	455	389	384	393
Honduras	842	897	895	920	963	1,025	1,041	1,101	1,191	1,293
Hong Kong	5,711	6,028	6,176	5,652	6,263	6,593	7,486	9,097	10,578	12,022
Hungary	2,357	2,419	2,471	2,252	2,194	2,232	2,582	2,850	3,063	3,115
Iceland	14,943	15,276	13,867	11,823	12,101	12,462	16,475	22,544	24,669	22,674
India	257	268	267	285	276	281	301	326	353	342
Indonesia	573	710	712	629	632	617	554	515	591	663
Iran	2,473	2,553	3,038	3,621	3,645	1,613	1,496	1,713	1,742	1,663
Iraq	920	802	820	761	770	775	836	1,001	1,044	966
Ireland	6,345	5,965	6,140	5,893	5,674	5,980	8,060	9,520	10,610	11,029
Israel	6,461	6,727	7,221	7,916	7,304	6,778	8,268	9,775	11,746	11,453
Italy	8,443	7,599	7,520	7,782	7,679	7,920	11,206	14,094	15,592	16,239
Jamaica	1,417	1,552	1,687	1,823	1,178	1,029	1,232	1,463	1,702	1,945
Japan	9,487	10,405	9,599	10,395	10,977	11,674	17,213	20,775	25,122	25,054
Jordan	1,760	1,809	1,848	1,853	1,815	1,840	2,144	2,188	1,960	1,286
Kenya	647	587	544	487	486	463	527	560	577	546
Kiribati	1,040	657	639	595	642	468	442	501	628	587
North Korea	639	653	808	794	745	722	805	836	764	811
South Korea	1,735	1,904	2,011	2,215	2,420	2,476	2,814	3,514	4,680	5,724
Kuwait	20,725	17,384	14,210	13,157	13,090	12,359	9,820	11,662	10,331	11,835
Laos	98	122	135	143	155	163	170	167	164	190
Lebanon	2,091	1,990	1,349	1,419	991	850	1,049	816	1,303	1,066
Lesotho	269	266	238	253	211	169	194	243	278	288
Liberia	404	449	448	430	413	401	392	414	446	466
Libya	11,966	10,076	9,520	8,873	7,790	7,782	6,139	5,554	6,104	6,300
Liechtenstein	23,094	21,801	22,001	21,872	20,792	21,685	31,638	42,316	46,207	44,053
Luxembourg	17,071	14,302	13,013	12,785	12,526	12,879	18,721	23,149	25,990	27,435
Macau	4,095	4,220	4,333	4,129	4,556	4,553	4,907	6,016	6,755	7,700
Madagascar	373	323	309	300	303	286	317	243	225	223
Malawi	300	292	270	274	259	233	231	226	237	271
Malaysia	1,770	1,763	1,843	2,033	2,214	1,979	1,710	1,927	2,050	2,194
Maldives	583	596	731	735	817	869	936	900	1,040	1,133
Mali	254	230	198	170	164	176	253	294	300	296
Malta	4,042	3,978	3,905	3,645	3,406	3,417	4,340	5,243	5,986	6,220
Marshall Islands	881	981	1,057	1,207	1,246	1,155	1,405	1,508	1,619	1,604
Mauritania	975	915	806	796	673	614	702	775	793	788
Mauritius	1,201	1,197	1,118	1,119	1,058	1,086	1,465	1,821	2,044	2,074
Mexico	3,345	4,194	2,851	2,391	2,761	2,841	1,952	2,073	2,487	2,968
Federated States of Micronesia	933	1,075	1,088	1,106	1,079	1,262	1,353	1,380	1,492	1,536
Monaco	50,171	43,362	40,510	38,140	35,630	36,723	50,859	61,356	66,765	67,024
Mongolia	402	464	521	558	597	634	688	710	752	794
Montserrat	2,376	2,810	3,136	3,369	3,638	3,850	4,138	4,538	5,203	5,904
Morocco	1,101	872	859	758	678	669	862	932	1,079	1,095
Mozambique	480	452	463	422	471	439	453	265	226	244
Myanmar	171	168	168	170	171	172	127	123	111	118
Namibia	2,500	2,220	1,994	2,061	1,674	1,338	1,460	1,784	1,873	1,825
Nauru	5,597	5,882	5,501	5,185	5,007	4,043	3,990	4,337	4,923	5,090
Nepal	140	156	161	156	157	164	165	180	198	193
Netherlands	13,661	11,426	10,976	10,574	9,868	9,813	13,628	16,530	17,561	17,212
Netherlands Antilles	5,476	6,261	6,628	6,518	6,506	6,558	8,429	8,739	8,996	10,035
New Caledonia	8,335	6,758	6,171	5,530	5,257	5,553	7,676	9,348	12,793	13,232
New Zealand	7,425	7,956	7,866	7,739	7,384	7,376	9,207	11,617	13,886	13,283
Nicaragua	836	937	960	1,016	1,010	975	962	958	849	849
Niger	452	384	340	296	233	224	282	317	320	290
Nigeria	2,693	2,424	2,321	2,278	2,204	2,131	1,050	631	738	650
Norway	15,784	15,530	15,251	14,957	15,012	15,769	18,898	22,536	24,263	24,324
Oman	5,419	6,187	6,157	6,170	6,467	6,861	5,212	5,265	4,939	5,321
Pakistan	397	456	430	422	439	421	425	439	485	470
Palau	2,104	2,282	2,455	2,631	2,916	3,241	3,616	4,044	4,526	5,057
Palestine	711	639	659	663	632	571	887	946	965	883
Panama	2,049	2,253	2,331	2,393	2,474	2,580	2,666	2,691	2,353	2,310
Papua New Guinea	1,319	1,260	1,162	1,127	1,086	1,001	1,076	1,247	1,415	1,340
Paraguay	1,236	1,519	1,535	1,656	1,319	1,094	1,265	1,031	1,335	940
Peru	959	1,143	1,135	860	881	743	1,080	1,730	1,478	1,626
Philippines	759	811	822	715	658	627	593	642	713	781
Poland	1,652	1,550	1,864	2,134	2,118	1,956	2,025	1,743	1,871	2,229
Portugal	3,372	3,255	3,092	2,751	2,542	2,731	3,904	4,861	5,694	6,129
Puerto Rico	4,592	5,009	5,200	5,301	5,822	6,106	6,552	7,062	7,678	8,221
Qatar	35,035	34,962	27,454	20,968	20,131	16,583	12,686	12,866	13,563	14,011
Romania	1,613	1,946	2,259	2,077	1,773	2,196	2,381	2,650	2,729	2,424
Rwanda	258	280	271	276	285	296	318	338	349	346
Samoa	720	673	686	629	611	532	560	618	734	675
San Marino	15,724	13,993	13,705	14,045	13,726	14,017	19,632	24,438	26,746	27,533
São Tomé and Príncipe	818	819	774	712	730	760	1,046	1,028	862	841
Saudi Arabia	16,599	17,457	13,625	10,799	9,439	7,776	6,199	5,845	5,784	6,022
Senegal	584	472	478	445	407	436	617	731	768	691
Seychelles	2,686	2,743	2,610	2,564	2,632	2,922	3,604	4,302	4,900	5,250
Sierra Leone	432	453	498	424	507	397	271	222	339	312
Singapore	5,003	5,831	6,298	6,969	7,386	6,850	6,781	7,654	9,206	10,665
Solomon Islands	622	678	662	484	663	591	520	510	597	553
Somalia	94	107	116	108	117	133	133	149	151	155
South Africa	2,886	2,892	2,585	2,809	2,425	1,808	2,019	2,593	2,729	2,780
Soviet Union	3,551	3,396	3,563	3,653	3,420	3,302	3,042	2,831	2,743	2,711
Spain	6,156	5,326	5,115	4,438	4,448	4,655	6,451	8,161	9,611	10,577
Sri Lanka	325	340	358	381	430	425	444	456	482	476
Saint Kitts and Nevis	1,567	1,839	1,973	2,001	2,267	2,524	3,004	3,403	4,038	4,531
Saint Lucia	1,283	1,449	1,547	1,656	1,801	1,970	2,348	2,523	2,822	3,138
Saint Vincent and the Grenadines	696	847	974	1,083	1,170	1,277	1,430	1,587	1,821	1,963
Sudan	333	388	284	247	323	294	387	489	473	452
Suriname	3,002	3,353	3,445	3,315	3,221	3,221	3,238	3,497	4,059	1,889
Swaziland	1,336	1,435	1,294	1,335	1,057	764	925	1,171	1,309	1,300
Sweden	16,856	15,368	13,548	12,435	12,919	13,473	17,711	21,445	24,130	25,261
Switzerland	18,832	17,214	17,572	17,412	16,524	16,651	23,731	29,548	31,770	30,457
Syria	1,468	1,818	1,835	1,887	1,873	942	884	895	1,018	851
Tanzania	500	559	573	560	499	534	366	249	281	291
Thailand	706	746	768	825	846	773	841	968	1,161	1,339
Togo	416	338	282	244	222	228	312	360	423	403
Tonga	848	876	910	915	912	779	930	1,115	1,533	1,597
Trinidad and Tobago	5,746	6,342	7,264	6,818	6,712	6,299	4,049	4,014	3,732	3,562
Tunisia	1,507	1,414	1,326	1,283	1,237	1,261	1,318	1,384	1,408	1,378
Turkey	2,106	2,125	1,886	1,761	1,675	1,838	2,028	2,290	2,343	2,714
Turks and Caicos Islands	4,276	4,614	4,951	5,304	5,697	6,144	6,659	7,236	7,886	8,547
Tuvalu	534	579	457	475	509	407	500	602	847	917
Uganda	259	285	317	340	325	324	357	386	426	363
United Arab Emirates	42,879	45,131	40,245	35,136	32,655	30,067	23,728	23,953	22,477	24,219
United Kingdom	10,049	9,616	9,156	8,699	8,191	8,672	10,642	13,153	16,025	16,275
United States	12,468	13,854	14,298	15,405	16,949	18,059	18,887	19,844	21,191	22,600
Uruguay	3,650	4,048	3,293	1,895	1,789	1,735	2,142	2,668	2,736	2,785
Vanuatu	1,073	911	884	922	1,097	1,020	968	1,005	1,156	1,106
Venezuela	4,507	4,922	4,895	4,755	3,396	3,425	3,259	2,521	3,082	2,137
Vietnam	44	34	38	56	85	79	81	83	89	94
North Yemen	260	275	300	301	298	304	307	311	315	321
South Yemen	195	217	251	256	264	249	210	209	213	233
Yugoslavia	3,181	3,108	2,810	2,857	3,059	3,249	3,518	3,750	3,891	4,197
Zambia	728	654	673	608	470	395	291	282	451	499
Zimbabwe	981	1,136	1,164	1,017	799	852	905	946	1,060	1,086

=== 1990s ===
Country / territory	1990	1991	1992	1993	1994	1995	1996	1997	1998	1999
Afghanistan	300	261	253	180	133	193	179	167	157	143
Albania	654	488	468	533	599	770	1,035	719	823	1,034
Algeria	2,383	1,754	1,807	1,830	1,493	1,452	1,592	1,608	1,585	1,577
Andorra	23,885	24,713	25,992	20,889	20,532	23,358	24,090	23,289	24,003	24,451
Angola	1,229	1,411	1,569	1,100	1,096	509	650	741	607	563
Anguilla	9,071	8,966	9,405	9,940	10,772	10,578	10,886	11,904	13,147	13,643
Antigua and Barbuda	7,422	7,718	7,871	8,250	8,857	8,446	9,022	9,423	9,809	10,076
Argentina	4,680	6,194	7,367	7,522	8,081	7,993	8,330	8,861	8,944	8,388
Armenia	650	599	363	347	383	426	537	557	648	636
Aruba	12,308	13,496	14,047	14,938	17,342	16,441	16,586	17,927	19,082	19,356
Australia	18,940	19,015	18,591	17,888	20,205	21,634	23,777	23,600	20,826	22,547
Austria	21,549	22,356	24,906	24,117	25,606	30,162	29,590	26,489	27,131	26,979
Azerbaijan	905	914	712	552	446	396	405	500	557	569
Bahamas	14,436	13,927	13,656	13,328	13,806	14,309	16,034	17,127	18,998	20,506
Bahrain	9,899	10,198	10,392	11,101	11,673	12,039	12,174	12,237	11,322	11,831
Bangladesh	265	277	277	279	291	320	329	333	338	348
Barbados	7,815	7,725	7,441	7,821	8,194	8,585	9,120	9,604	10,788	11,264
Belarus	1,845	1,878	1,737	1,647	1,489	1,364	1,432	1,397	1,514	1,213
Belgium	20,688	21,140	23,487	22,386	24,304	28,496	27,624	24,977	25,507	25,416
Belize	2,162	2,264	2,408	2,684	2,738	2,834	3,001	2,953	2,991	3,064
Benin	398	390	425	414	281	392	413	385	405	399
Bermuda	33,398	34,483	34,861	36,918	38,194	40,782	43,087	46,362	49,290	52,141
Bhutan	511	436	444	426	508	568	597	684	675	733
Bolivia	710	764	791	788	806	887	958	1,007	1,059	1,013
Bosnia and Herzegovina	1,713	1,378	1,101	877	706	524	742	1,027	1,149	1,270
Botswana	2,697	2,723	2,786	2,721	2,767	3,001	3,008	3,050	2,855	3,210
Brazil	2,706	2,476	2,334	2,579	3,622	4,781	5,140	5,250	5,007	3,431
British Virgin Islands	8,894	8,099	10,151	13,342	17,001	21,547	23,840	27,089	30,467	33,340
Brunei	15,181	15,513	17,048	16,264	15,757	17,780	18,741	18,590	14,162	15,739
Bulgaria	2,350	961	1,095	1,395	1,265	1,727	1,222	1,365	1,799	1,674
Burkina Faso	356	350	365	338	195	238	252	232	258	267
Burundi	204	202	184	162	174	160	137	152	137	122
Cape Verde	1,027	1,045	1,137	1,116	1,228	1,434	1,437	1,369	1,424	1,580
Cambodia	188	241	248	243	258	309	318	304	269	294
Cameroon	981	916	907	931	525	640	667	620	650	646
Canada	21,471	21,786	20,892	20,124	19,938	20,615	21,242	21,854	20,960	22,224
Cayman Islands	37,182	37,040	37,559	38,588	39,938	40,930	41,941	43,033	53,251	54,735
Central African Republic	513	479	478	422	274	350	309	280	283	286
Chad	308	296	299	252	198	235	254	234	258	216
Chile	2,624	2,951	3,510	3,670	4,139	5,225	5,416	5,839	5,523	5,014
China	345	355	417	518	466	600	700	774	823	869
Colombia	1,661	1,669	1,755	1,995	2,588	2,946	3,044	3,291	2,994	2,584
Comoros	587	574	605	582	398	484	468	419	414	417
DR Congo	424	391	344	432	226	212	211	211	216	187
Congo	1,173	1,112	1,166	1,040	670	778	909	808	652	776
Cook Islands	3,777	4,091	4,186	4,630	5,452	5,786	5,854	5,427	4,780	5,149
Costa Rica	2,197	2,114	2,467	2,704	2,889	3,128	3,087	3,266	3,509	3,848
Ivory Coast	978	915	922	826	596	771	817	766	804	778
Croatia	3,479	2,847	2,585	2,761	3,726	4,849	5,176	5,256	5,662	5,248
Cuba	2,707	2,280	2,057	2,071	2,621	2,790	2,284	2,306	2,331	2,560
Cyprus	10,802	10,860	12,680	11,801	13,013	15,265	15,154	14,225	15,083	15,283
Czech Republic	3,905	2,862	3,344	3,913	4,581	5,760	6,466	5,975	6,445	6,295
Denmark	26,895	27,012	29,570	27,587	29,966	35,357	35,710	32,888	33,403	33,456
Djibouti	777	764	768	754	786	771	737	716	713	754
Dominica	2,794	2,966	3,202	3,336	3,578	3,639	3,935	4,104	4,374	4,539
Dominican Republic	1,326	1,347	1,532	1,706	1,818	1,995	2,127	2,407	2,516	2,594
Ecuador	1,491	1,623	1,689	1,729	2,027	2,135	2,158	2,360	2,299	1,584
Egypt	639	679	777	842	923	1,053	1,163	1,260	1,322	1,369
El Salvador	914	998	1,104	1,270	1,463	1,700	1,828	1,956	2,093	2,158
Equatorial Guinea	389	372	437	426	305	415	657	1,208	979	1,586
Eritrea	106	121	138	160	200	202	234	240	243	231
Estonia	3,589	3,450	2,831	2,793	2,855	3,086	3,346	3,594	3,991	4,084
Ethiopia	233	257	198	138	129	133	139	140	123	114
Fiji	1,838	1,885	2,062	2,172	2,388	2,571	2,695	2,678	2,100	2,442
Finland	28,380	25,524	22,369	17,634	20,312	26,271	25,771	24,671	25,991	26,182
France	21,795	21,683	23,826	22,392	23,488	26,859	26,823	24,174	24,901	24,617
French Polynesia	17,987	18,236	19,446	18,219	18,547	20,542	19,429	18,208	18,582	18,031
Gabon	6,342	6,147	6,196	5,834	4,406	5,080	5,684	5,203	4,275	4,293
Gambia	772	727	729	749	720	738	774	713	725	683
Georgia	1,548	1,268	730	538	501	534	614	713	744	583
Germany	22,353	23,424	26,515	25,639	27,164	31,753	30,582	27,059	27,353	26,839
Ghana	682	746	713	601	534	618	647	629	667	673
Greece	9,662	10,290	11,260	10,429	11,060	12,864	13,599	13,257	13,300	13,670
Greenland	18,018	17,915	18,270	16,324	17,718	21,298	21,088	18,865	20,207	19,849
Grenada	2,467	2,582	2,611	2,579	2,676	2,793	2,978	3,196	3,506	3,768
Guatemala	745	893	968	1,031	1,145	1,261	1,326	1,458	1,553	1,431
Guinea	647	648	658	618	615	669	677	645	577	549
Guinea-Bissau	578	601	620	635	653	677	444	334	298	315
Guyana	877	775	831	1,033	1,202	1,364	1,541	1,628	1,552	1,497
Haiti	436	414	286	240	277	345	373	400	455	486
Honduras	742	726	788	786	751	845	850	961	1,049	1,058
Hong Kong	13,277	15,188	17,630	20,145	22,453	23,542	25,484	27,663	25,746	24,782
Hungary	3,564	3,341	3,726	3,860	4,152	4,473	4,503	4,575	4,732	4,786
Iceland	25,592	27,065	27,468	23,894	24,318	26,852	27,776	27,845	30,730	32,084
India	364	316	311	298	335	373	385	411	406	425
Indonesia	735	809	863	964	1,062	1,195	1,325	1,239	540	785
Iran	1,716	1,835	1,887	2,027	1,922	1,896	2,011	1,825	1,733	1,757
Iraq	977	333	382	265	206	172	292	310	383	648
Ireland	13,852	13,960	15,626	14,577	15,786	18,986	20,651	22,347	24,069	26,071
Israel	13,195	14,643	15,824	15,333	16,822	18,808	20,041	20,375	20,116	19,893
Italy	20,653	21,779	23,060	18,589	19,182	20,498	22,928	21,721	22,212	21,890
Jamaica	2,021	1,794	1,593	2,034	2,013	2,629	2,933	3,318	3,417	3,423
Japan	25,685	29,161	31,643	36,120	39,541	43,774	38,733	35,304	32,191	36,357
Jordan	1,197	1,185	1,421	1,417	1,501	1,558	1,558	1,594	1,712	1,737
Kazakhstan	1,798	1,656	1,611	1,510	1,362	1,291	1,339	1,433	1,453	1,120
Kenya	540	493	471	317	392	491	489	519	544	485
Kiribati	552	643	643	621	715	720	847	838	805	834
North Korea	735	663	593	503	384	222	479	462	456	452
South Korea	6,501	7,513	8,009	8,773	10,275	12,454	13,301	12,311	8,207	10,570
Kosovo	2,731	2,030	1,486	1,098	1,093	2,351	1,531	1,448	1,325	932
Kuwait	8,972	5,488	10,407	13,372	14,693	16,221	19,227	17,999	14,690	16,255
Kyrgyzstan	594	559	489	420	340	325	392	373	340	255
Laos	204	235	252	277	313	352	363	331	239	266
Latvia	3,632	3,386	2,285	2,025	2,117	2,173	2,428	2,680	2,972	3,146
Lebanon	1,091	1,582	2,032	2,726	3,148	3,793	4,439	5,043	5,430	5,388
Lesotho	341	374	434	426	438	490	459	477	440	436
Liberia	232	213	140	101	83	82	92	145	163	184
Libya	7,068	7,648	7,929	7,028	6,430	5,800	6,294	6,557	5,801	6,413
Liechtenstein	55,252	56,962	61,773	62,475	71,682	88,001	89,306	80,647	85,624	90,630
Lithuania	2,774	2,702	2,181	1,879	1,742	1,847	2,328	2,832	3,171	3,122
Luxembourg	34,553	36,964	40,933	41,431	45,412	52,745	52,513	46,894	47,470	51,478
Macau	8,954	10,109	12,915	14,611	15,993	17,558	17,577	17,502	16,099	15,256
Madagascar	267	225	244	267	228	235	288	247	253	244
Malawi	278	315	281	308	182	208	236	243	245	237
Malaysia	2,417	2,626	3,080	3,396	3,686	4,286	4,743	4,593	3,228	3,456
Maldives	1,247	1,377	1,562	1,723	1,856	2,211	2,442	2,699	2,813	3,012
Mali	352	336	373	361	260	329	329	310	327	320
Malta	7,407	7,921	8,622	7,659	8,401	9,929	10,133	9,969	10,412	10,642
Marshall Islands	1,674	1,717	1,861	2,005	2,156	2,378	2,177	2,056	2,093	2,073
Mauritania	802	836	824	684	704	720	707	667	565	535
Mauritius	2,481	2,626	3,018	3,009	3,240	3,625	3,920	3,673	3,622	3,695
Mexico	3,427	4,020	4,556	4,954	5,071	3,384	3,858	4,571	4,719	5,300
Federated States of Micronesia	1,639	1,780	1,865	1,988	2,015	2,063	2,019	1,905	2,029	2,046
Moldova	911	775	562	570	403	407	392	450	399	277
Monaco	82,625	82,117	89,966	84,180	87,872	100,012	99,416	89,175	91,428	89,995
Mongolia	787	726	665	654	679	730	691	613	560	519
Montenegro	3,491	2,849	2,400	1,325	1,364	1,958	1,410	1,369	1,394	1,361
Montserrat	7,026	5,979	6,204	6,165	6,823	6,729	5,858	5,356	5,665	6,398
Morocco	1,215	1,286	1,291	1,196	1,332	1,426	1,561	1,404	1,486	1,458
Mozambique	264	238	165	165	163	162	215	251	281	298
Myanmar	124	125	139	149	161	174	186	197	127	140
Namibia	1,893	1,939	2,135	2,090	2,319	2,425	2,344	2,368	2,150	2,087
Nauru	5,377	4,869	4,469	3,787	3,720	3,496	3,364	3,075	2,387	2,447
Nepal	202	180	190	186	208	212	215	232	214	231
Netherlands	21,070	21,527	23,687	22,904	24,388	28,899	28,668	26,361	27,509	27,960
Netherlands Antilles	10,520	10,975	11,454	12,175	13,088	13,560	14,318	14,951	15,329	15,443
New Caledonia	15,008	15,404	16,584	15,632	16,436	19,178	18,643	17,921	17,616	17,703
New Zealand	13,374	12,722	12,008	12,805	14,784	17,185	18,695	18,470	15,113	15,696
Nicaragua	861	865	898	937	854	896	916	917	952	981
Niger	333	306	308	273	163	191	197	175	193	183
Nigeria	715	652	577	549	445	452	468	477	484	481
North Macedonia	1,459	1,466	1,386	1,508	1,820	2,409	2,370	1,987	1,898	1,932
Norway	28,250	28,592	30,530	27,979	29,331	34,871	37,282	36,564	34,721	36,334
Oman	6,377	5,927	6,220	5,979	5,971	6,228	6,806	7,031	6,261	6,979
Pakistan	480	506	554	533	560	630	613	601	590	575
Palau	5,633	5,992	6,242	5,588	6,060	6,729	7,455	7,616	7,721	7,329
Palestine	921	953	1,125	1,159	1,137	1,254	1,243	1,309	1,356	1,369
Panama	2,459	2,648	2,949	3,156	3,297	3,302	3,335	3,535	3,755	3,857
Papua New Guinea	1,187	1,363	1,506	1,669	1,788	1,542	1,599	1,489	1,109	985
Paraguay	1,104	1,277	1,285	1,338	1,492	1,694	1,797	1,781	1,555	1,405
Peru	1,334	1,542	1,578	1,494	1,891	2,220	2,262	2,342	2,202	1,964
Philippines	793	792	902	904	1,040	1,176	1,285	1,249	967	1,088
Poland	1,727	2,234	2,458	2,500	2,875	3,683	4,144	4,124	4,524	4,406
Portugal	7,960	9,006	10,822	9,515	9,937	11,721	12,118	11,521	12,158	12,450
Puerto Rico	8,822	9,219	9,790	10,336	11,005	11,721	12,362	13,042	14,549	15,489
Qatar	15,448	14,189	15,615	14,542	14,892	16,243	17,699	21,389	18,693	21,718
Romania	1,728	1,306	889	1,203	1,381	1,640	1,630	1,583	1,869	1,623
Russia	3,869	3,786	3,305	3,087	2,752	2,694	2,648	2,740	1,838	1,333
Rwanda	335	256	285	294	190	208	218	275	273	240
Samoa	688	681	712	709	1,174	1,151	1,287	1,394	1,301	1,321
San Marino	34,580	35,971	37,538	32,821	35,067	39,410	44,808	41,797	44,357	46,423
São Tomé and Príncipe	999	882	762	990	1,013	785	1,005	672	520	546
Saudi Arabia	7,180	7,818	7,869	7,422	7,347	7,593	8,197	8,367	7,230	7,765
Senegal	826	773	821	718	468	559	567	510	536	535
Serbia	5,121	4,860	3,568	2,538	2,656	2,861	2,986	3,178	2,416	2,441
Seychelles	6,306	6,327	7,207	7,651	7,726	8,005	7,769	8,668	9,280	9,387
Sierra Leone	224	268	234	267	320	307	333	299	235	229
Singapore	12,896	14,668	16,335	18,426	21,768	25,237	27,002	27,418	22,944	22,572
Slovakia	3,179	2,218	2,402	2,578	2,974	3,722	4,016	4,068	4,236	3,861
Slovenia	9,029	6,578	6,508	6,602	7,513	10,683	10,798	10,437	11,128	11,410
Solomon Islands	667	687	790	833	916	1,015	1,091	1,075	918	947
Somalia	157	97	93	159	179	177	194	222	279	266
South Africa	3,172	3,323	3,518	3,429	3,488	3,800	3,548	3,612	3,210	3,137
Spain	13,653	14,651	15,970	13,252	13,348	15,414	16,075	14,719	15,368	15,676
Sri Lanka	542	603	642	682	766	838	899	967	1,000	988
Saint Kitts and Nevis	5,112	5,118	5,547	5,968	6,552	6,988	7,346	8,132	8,214	8,670
Saint Lucia	3,365	3,570	3,916	3,873	3,989	4,199	4,413	4,433	4,800	4,989
Saint Vincent and the Grenadines	2,179	2,327	2,554	2,609	2,661	2,887	3,047	3,215	3,477	3,616
Sudan	490	426	442	442	407	426	270	320	332	317
Suriname	1,844	1,921	1,938	1,819	1,889	1,894	2,322	2,445	2,884	2,349
Swaziland	1,454	1,500	1,624	1,611	1,685	1,974	1,822	1,914	1,725	1,651
Sweden	30,161	31,377	32,302	24,029	25,724	29,915	32,556	29,854	30,109	30,557
Switzerland	38,572	38,644	39,789	38,269	41,943	48,705	46,690	40,422	41,467	40,619
Syria	897	971	1,095	1,147	890	945	1,028	1,068	1,122	1,115
Tajikistan	537	504	359	302	239	211	176	154	217	176
Tanzania (mainland)	277	303	261	230	230	260	313	358	384	384
Tanzania (Zanzibar)	201	220	214	202	199	235	295	438	325	314
Thailand	1,561	1,766	1,997	2,209	2,494	2,852	3,052	2,476	1,853	2,040
Timor-Leste	282	315	386	431	475	527	613	574	661	460
Togo	472	455	465	346	262	338	360	357	329	321
Tonga	1,703	2,049	2,019	1,991	2,032	2,120	2,291	2,206	1,953	2,006
Trinidad and Tobago	4,148	4,316	4,396	3,678	3,957	4,246	4,577	4,551	4,787	5,384
Tunisia	1,642	1,697	1,978	1,826	1,916	2,172	2,323	2,211	2,295	2,389
Turkey	3,751	3,698	3,832	4,277	3,049	3,889	4,103	4,226	4,389	4,009
Turkmenistan	839	804	679	686	565	523	558	618	651	867
Turks and Caicos Islands	9,170	9,757	10,285	11,086	11,780	12,424	13,404	14,238	15,494	16,489
Tuvalu	1,059	1,120	1,176	1,047	1,244	1,275	1,349	1,441	1,391	1,470
Uganda	248	195	202	203	309	350	344	360	335	309
Ukraine	1,823	1,720	1,586	1,395	1,102	991	914	1,037	874	665
United Arab Emirates	27,989	26,946	26,864	26,141	26,496	27,974	29,813	30,377	27,681	29,279
United Kingdom	19,142	19,956	20,546	18,436	19,752	22,802	23,986	26,380	27,773	28,168
United States	23,649	24,177	25,355	26,403	27,758	28,782	30,058	31,547	32,890	34,535
Uruguay	2,971	3,543	4,508	5,213	6,028	6,609	6,976	7,328	7,711	7,247
Uzbekistan	719	723	643	630	599	594	604	661	629	706
Vanuatu	1,169	1,355	1,372	1,372	1,464	1,621	1,649	1,630	1,459	1,461
Venezuela	2,368	2,544	2,811	2,732	2,631	3,375	3,014	3,715	3,876	4,078
Vietnam	95	110	139	182	220	276	323	347	347	361
Yemen	337	333	339	343	341	389	460	477	431	502
Zambia	466	404	386	372	405	411	379	441	353	330
Zimbabwe	1,120	1,018	820	779	804	820	981	994	687	645

=== 2000s ===
Country / territory	2000	2001	2002	2003	2004	2005	2006	2007	2008	2009
Afghanistan	179	176	199	219	238	271	298	401	406	462
Albania	1,117	1,257	1,395	1,784	2,312	2,612	2,916	3,546	4,340	4,111
Algeria	1,753	1,743	1,776	2,095	2,600	3,102	3,468	3,940	4,912	3,876
Andorra	21,933	22,088	24,395	32,074	37,476	40,084	42,497	47,324	46,808	42,824
Angola	811	768	949	1,067	1,362	2,064	2,825	3,402	4,462	3,565
Anguilla	13,545	13,624	13,465	14,121	16,300	18,130	22,031	27,028	26,511	20,817
Antigua and Barbuda	10,630	10,079	10,118	10,509	11,181	12,293	13,766	15,432	15,931	14,110
Argentina	8,315	7,775	2,919	3,666	4,285	5,145	5,951	7,282	9,094	8,282
Armenia	663	738	832	986	1,260	1,733	2,268	3,286	4,180	3,109
Aruba	20,620	20,672	20,434	20,835	22,567	23,303	24,046	25,836	27,089	24,640
Australia	21,398	20,181	22,293	28,305	33,925	37,574	39,706	46,990	49,395	46,457
Austria	24,398	24,379	26,246	31,968	36,585	38,208	40,425	46,552	51,327	47,549
Azerbaijan	650	696	753	869	1,025	1,547	2,422	3,771	5,508	4,932
Bahamas	21,241	21,497	22,505	22,008	21,996	23,406	23,721	24,306	23,657	22,043
Bahrain	13,591	12,917	13,226	14,542	16,275	18,418	19,669	21,168	23,043	19,167
Bangladesh	346	340	346	373	397	403	483	545	618	681
Barbados	11,568	11,514	11,675	12,028	12,869	14,223	15,646	16,462	16,570	16,523
Belarus	1,047	1,249	1,485	1,827	2,387	3,134	3,853	4,738	6,377	5,177
Belgium	23,169	23,066	24,977	30,595	35,349	36,676	38,543	44,073	48,116	44,638
Belize	3,364	3,419	3,557	3,680	3,832	3,933	4,187	4,325	4,470	4,259
Benin	370	374	412	509	571	587	609	686	795	768
Bermuda	54,349	57,221	60,935	64,532	68,934	74,753	82,507	90,881	95,607	92,354
Bhutan	778	820	897	1,009	1,108	1,258	1,346	1,755	1,811	1,787
Bolivia	1,007	958	914	917	978	1,046	1,234	1,390	1,737	1,777
Bosnia and Herzegovina	1,501	1,565	1,811	2,283	2,722	2,928	3,352	4,108	4,975	4,586
Botswana	3,333	3,115	3,044	4,149	4,879	5,328	5,342	5,667	5,562	5,177
Brazil	3,711	3,143	2,828	3,044	3,596	4,731	5,808	7,247	8,707	8,475
British Virgin Islands	36,380	38,412	36,507	32,364	33,100	37,550	39,401	40,873	38,744	33,119
Brunei	20,117	18,412	18,856	20,786	24,523	29,184	34,524	36,241	41,884	30,723
Bulgaria	1,643	1,782	2,079	2,700	3,370	3,882	4,499	5,915	7,276	6,941
Burkina Faso	227	237	261	332	371	407	420	475	569	552
Burundi	105	95	88	80	89	141	155	159	183	194
Cape Verde	1,398	1,431	1,551	2,001	2,241	2,331	2,634	3,146	3,698	3,517
Cambodia	301	321	338	362	407	472	538	629	743	735
Cameroon	583	589	648	791	893	915	965	1,071	1,192	1,165
Canada	24,177	23,761	24,224	28,244	32,056	36,253	40,337	44,417	46,431	40,631
Cayman Islands	54,633	53,935	54,459	54,893	56,274	62,558	64,105	68,299	67,033	61,474
Central African Republic	257	257	269	304	333	348	373	418	475	465
Chad	189	224	251	331	517	664	715	779	931	812
Chile	5,101	4,594	4,453	4,841	6,242	7,645	9,501	10,514	10,791	10,217
China	957	1,052	1,150	1,294	1,514	1,768	2,114	2,706	3,471	3,840
Colombia	2,472	2,396	2,356	2,245	2,740	3,386	3,709	4,674	5,434	5,148
Comoros	372	392	429	539	610	615	641	712	786	769
DR Congo	174	169	171	170	190	213	247	273	311	286
Congo	1,036	878	927	1,049	1,362	1,738	2,145	2,001	2,655	2,364
Cook Islands	5,140	5,346	6,074	8,174	9,358	9,411	9,557	11,478	11,661	10,653
Costa Rica	3,808	3,982	4,062	4,168	4,425	4,697	5,245	6,121	6,911	6,809
Ivory Coast	647	664	718	875	930	942	963	1,079	1,258	1,233
Croatia	4,917	5,283	6,113	7,894	9,481	10,374	11,545	13,789	16,218	14,464
Cuba	2,750	2,841	3,003	3,201	3,399	3,787	4,678	5,194	5,386	5,495
Cyprus	14,364	14,816	16,042	20,240	23,773	25,311	27,172	31,353	35,392	32,104
Czech Republic	5,989	6,577	7,990	9,724	11,651	13,292	15,111	18,278	22,620	19,668
Denmark	30,751	30,775	33,271	40,516	46,563	48,815	51,994	58,428	64,302	58,157
Djibouti	769	787	800	829	868	910	974	1,061	1,206	1,235
Dominica	4,612	4,710	4,636	4,814	5,329	5,251	5,627	6,056	6,618	7,028
Dominican Republic	2,798	2,898	2,905	2,274	2,442	3,844	4,048	4,596	4,932	4,903
Ecuador	1,451	1,904	2,184	2,440	2,709	3,022	3,351	3,591	4,275	4,256
Egypt	1,400	1,304	1,220	1,025	1,076	1,260	1,413	1,703	2,087	2,337
El Salvador	2,260	2,363	2,435	2,550	2,666	2,874	3,109	3,358	3,569	3,431
Equatorial Guinea	2,582	3,488	4,171	5,550	9,536	14,482	15,621	19,633	28,781	21,251
Eritrea	200	206	193	222	273	262	281	299	307	404
Estonia	4,067	4,487	5,295	7,163	8,844	10,330	12,578	16,539	18,035	14,716
Ethiopia	121	116	109	117	133	159	190	235	308	331
Fiji	2,105	2,066	2,289	2,871	3,375	3,627	3,718	4,047	4,179	3,370
Finland	24,252	24,911	26,835	32,810	37,633	38,966	41,116	48,280	53,396	47,090
France	22,340	22,434	24,197	29,602	33,797	34,833	36,523	41,588	45,401	41,604
French Polynesia	15,835	15,306	16,044	19,806	22,053	22,374	22,786	25,435	27,039	24,709
Gabon	4,609	4,111	4,191	4,975	5,821	6,952	7,324	8,633	10,523	7,755
Gambia	637	543	442	361	415	433	440	520	609	550
Georgia	645	687	733	872	1,133	1,433	1,749	2,319	2,946	2,505
Germany	23,810	23,844	25,450	30,718	34,628	35,218	37,040	42,543	46,519	42,447
Ghana	424	441	499	602	683	804	930	1,099	1,234	1,096
Greece	12,025	12,395	13,971	18,307	21,772	22,383	24,626	28,611	31,758	29,517
Greenland	18,693	18,957	20,336	24,727	28,470	28,969	31,799	35,854	40,534	40,851
Grenada	5,149	5,138	5,332	5,826	5,867	6,804	6,826	7,375	8,008	7,453
Guatemala	1,471	1,562	1,693	1,743	1,861	2,064	2,241	2,472	2,774	2,617
Guinea	485	455	448	513	531	420	426	619	668	627
Guinea-Bissau	276	283	297	340	371	401	396	456	554	518
Guyana	1,531	1,528	1,558	1,596	1,693	1,772	1,961	2,334	2,570	2,698
Haiti	429	404	364	315	401	448	518	625	660	660
Honduras	1,151	1,201	1,209	1,243	1,314	1,418	1,558	1,733	1,912	1,976
Hong Kong	25,307	24,779	24,268	23,559	24,716	26,536	28,229	30,762	31,732	30,801
Hungary	4,617	5,266	6,644	8,386	10,249	11,152	11,391	13,831	15,650	12,951
Iceland	31,812	28,680	32,070	39,003	46,756	56,248	56,643	69,725	56,898	40,998
India	431	437	449	517	616	710	791	991	1,048	1,069
Indonesia	831	797	958	1,135	1,225	1,345	1,693	1,981	2,308	2,409
Iran	1,664	1,793	2,189	2,241	2,650	3,135	3,647	4,705	5,476	5,438
Iraq	717	729	699	645	995	1,342	1,968	2,636	3,527	3,659
Ireland	25,993	27,967	32,243	40,653	47,061	50,356	54,066	61,530	61,366	51,716
Israel	22,004	21,311	19,380	19,948	20,922	21,573	22,780	25,827	30,439	28,545
Italy	19,979	20,264	21,968	27,061	30,822	31,584	32,970	37,250	40,304	36,743
Jamaica	3,463	3,512	3,689	3,559	3,819	4,199	4,433	4,733	5,045	4,440
Japan	38,878	34,162	32,595	35,137	37,983	37,450	35,634	35,483	39,570	41,082
Jordan	1,775	1,851	1,940	2,022	2,207	2,361	2,723	2,971	3,656	3,801
Kazakhstan	1,223	1,483	1,641	2,037	2,821	3,697	5,192	6,655	8,384	7,163
Kenya	466	468	462	510	536	608	712	858	939	943
Kiribati	885	760	844	1,060	1,131	1,215	1,152	1,358	1,413	1,297
North Korea	462	476	468	471	473	548	575	597	551	494
South Korea	12,155	11,465	13,022	14,466	16,164	18,866	21,122	23,290	20,660	18,480
Kosovo	871	1,339	1,554	1,835	2,022	2,108	2,213	2,669	3,233	3,201
Kuwait	19,548	17,532	18,674	22,841	27,436	35,694	42,502	45,157	54,479	36,779
Kyrgyzstan	277	306	319	380	436	481	549	727	970	872
Laos	312	311	320	361	420	473	569	709	874	908
Latvia	3,347	3,560	4,121	5,137	6,369	7,597	9,753	14,232	16,600	12,361
Lebanon	5,155	5,079	5,312	5,350	5,473	5,390	5,435	6,088	7,112	8,484
Lesotho	415	377	348	510	645	711	736	817	827	860
Liberia	183	174	183	139	165	186	207	232	250	268
Libya	7,208	6,275	3,971	4,677	5,838	7,834	9,324	10,414	15,569	11,087
Liechtenstein	83,385	82,703	88,364	100,057	111,647	117,279	127,180	145,102	158,939	139,781
Lithuania	3,310	3,542	4,159	5,520	6,707	7,819	9,139	12,172	14,875	11,801
Luxembourg	49,014	47,824	52,531	65,290	76,014	80,762	90,026	106,004	113,686	101,527
Macau	15,560	15,548	16,486	18,181	23,084	25,830	30,829	37,200	41,235	41,188
Macedonia	1,875	1,835	1,981	2,432	2,788	3,064	3,351	4,064	4,822	4,566
Madagascar	246	279	263	317	246	275	293	379	472	417
Malawi	226	217	238	213	225	231	245	264	308	429
Malaysia	4,005	3,879	4,133	4,431	4,925	5,564	6,195	7,241	8,487	7,312
Maldives	3,135	3,084	3,122	3,537	4,009	3,672	4,755	5,534	6,573	6,578
Mali	267	305	332	389	436	485	518	592	686	693
Malta	10,469	10,445	11,421	13,785	15,309	16,100	16,962	19,675	22,091	20,826
Marshall Islands	2,127	2,208	2,394	2,440	2,521	2,647	2,758	2,878	2,926	2,908
Mauritania	477	463	459	525	616	693	938	1,009	1,181	1,046
Mauritius	3,935	3,864	4,028	4,810	5,411	5,310	5,483	6,320	7,788	7,108
Mexico	6,308	6,662	6,860	6,674	7,113	7,880	8,666	9,220	9,579	7,648
Federated States of Micronesia	2,171	2,239	2,257	2,293	2,257	2,360	2,403	2,448	2,522	2,698
Moldova	307	354	398	475	624	719	822	1,066	1,473	1,328
Monaco	81,357	81,460	87,654	106,942	121,524	124,319	133,280	167,440	181,264	149,993
Mongolia	550	608	663	749	925	1,158	1,547	1,894	2,479	1,991
Montenegro	1,611	1,902	2,100	2,793	3,392	3,686	4,395	5,970	7,341	6,714
Montserrat	7,252	7,976	9,101	9,231	9,492	10,231	10,647	11,062	11,703	12,069
Morocco	1,344	1,355	1,438	1,756	1,988	2,058	2,247	2,549	2,951	2,929
Mozambique	275	254	260	281	333	366	382	419	500	461
Myanmar	153	158	213	202	207	239	275	360	507	641
Namibia	2,059	1,837	1,717	2,490	3,236	3,513	3,815	4,196	4,011	4,124
Nauru	2,163	1,894	1,892	2,387	2,731	2,599	2,514	2,294	4,135	5,409
Nepal	241	244	241	260	289	324	349	420	444	479
Netherlands	25,972	26,687	28,949	35,370	40,026	41,546	44,303	50,986	56,675	51,757
Netherlands Antilles	16,020	16,434	16,777	17,344	17,785	17,312	17,889	18,422	19,373	18,997
New Caledonia	16,246	15,403	17,099	22,151	26,146	27,270	30,019	37,346	37,725	35,693
New Zealand	14,111	13,850	15,781	20,872	25,117	27,746	26,653	32,402	31,101	28,029
Nicaragua	1,016	1,049	1,010	1,016	1,091	1,175	1,245	1,351	1,518	1,479
Niger	154	162	178	211	223	250	261	295	358	344
Nigeria	607	563	736	821	1,038	1,293	1,632	1,819	2,214	1,756
Norway	38,141	38,540	43,070	50,154	57,603	66,760	74,012	84,995	96,811	79,990
Oman	8,685	8,560	8,670	9,070	10,115	12,399	14,575	16,226	22,963	17,519
Pakistan	556	519	557	618	694	768	871	952	926	970
Palau	7,621	7,832	8,218	8,255	8,273	9,037	9,680	9,695	9,721	9,600
Palestine	1,338	1,210	1,052	1,152	1,234	1,350	1,341	1,466	1,731	1,835
Panama	3,837	3,825	3,903	4,038	4,349	4,659	5,072	6,095	7,009	7,471
Papua New Guinea	978	836	810	963	1,057	1,201	1,332	1,478	1,766	1,726
Paraguay	1,338	1,192	1,148	1,175	1,409	1,507	1,810	2,312	3,060	2,600
Peru	1,997	1,982	2,060	2,181	2,449	2,755	3,172	3,612	4,211	4,167
Philippines	1,040	958	1,001	1,011	1,080	1,197	1,395	1,679	1,929	1,837
Poland	4,466	4,953	5,167	5,657	6,634	7,959	8,960	11,144	13,856	11,408
Portugal	11,515	11,777	12,954	15,857	18,118	18,826	19,831	22,762	24,771	23,015
Puerto Rico	16,479	18,472	19,140	20,047	21,288	22,311	23,276	23,946	25,117	25,921
Qatar	29,926	28,577	30,523	35,222	43,347	53,207	61,593	67,612	82,990	61,464
Romania	1,692	1,852	2,113	2,756	3,532	4,657	5,825	8,176	10,037	8,163
Russia	1,774	2,103	2,379	2,976	4,102	5,320	6,906	9,077	11,604	8,542
Rwanda	216	201	196	213	237	287	337	398	492	530
Samoa	1,323	1,363	1,495	1,810	2,152	2,414	2,488	3,514	3,581	3,147
San Marino	41,604	43,270	46,091	58,041	67,216	69,333	73,234	83,268	91,241	77,642
São Tomé and Príncipe	528	516	566	658	704	824	859	911	1,193	1,172
Saudi Arabia	8,859	8,367	8,364	9,239	10,756	13,274	14,827	15,947	19,437	15,655
Senegal	475	482	513	643	732	773	808	949	1,095	1,016
Serbia	870	1,635	2,149	2,832	3,331	3,528	4,130	5,458	6,702	5,821
Seychelles	9,203	9,044	9,964	9,869	9,608	10,357	11,307	11,379	10,555	9,175
Sierra Leone	212	258	283	298	297	325	360	400	454	435
Singapore	24,459	22,192	22,229	22,800	26,098	28,343	32,027	38,029	39,638	38,752
Slovakia	3,840	3,969	4,601	6,300	7,997	9,093	10,595	14,267	17,899	16,464
Slovenia	10,230	10,499	11,853	14,937	17,314	18,204	19,738	23,848	27,377	24,595
Solomon Islands	820	790	630	704	794	915	980	1,195	1,266	1,240
Somalia	278	171	156	189	241	273	275	279	285	215
South Africa	3,083	2,708	2,501	3,731	4,796	5,331	5,540	6,025	5,696	5,804
Spain	14,611	15,182	16,864	21,349	24,778	26,388	28,391	32,720	35,687	32,379
Sri Lanka	1,019	971	1,027	1,124	1,221	1,430	1,645	1,869	2,336	2,398
Saint Kitts and Nevis	9,219	9,967	10,283	9,760	10,378	11,054	12,771	13,356	14,463	13,984
Saint Lucia	4,984	4,652	4,630	4,981	5,416	5,656	6,364	6,721	6,782	6,716
Saint Vincent and the Grenadines	3,673	3,982	4,271	4,447	4,808	5,064	5,610	6,220	6,370	6,177
Sudan	377	439	493	564	684	878	1,097	1,400	1,464	1,348
Suriname	2,406	2,109	2,754	3,195	3,690	4,457	5,296	5,862	6,973	7,562
Swaziland	1,603	1,418	1,300	1,995	2,523	2,813	2,844	2,963	2,809	3,047
Sweden	29,282	26,991	29,615	37,025	42,495	43,083	46,222	53,294	55,706	46,183
Switzerland	37,911	38,693	41,580	48,285	53,578	55,009	57,375	63,150	72,131	69,728
Syria	1,202	1,258	1,281	1,205	1,389	1,566	1,768	2,073	2,615	2,631
Tajikistan	139	172	191	238	311	340	407	524	711	672
Tanzania (mainland)	394	391	396	416	444	476	468	533	657	665
Tanzania (Zanzibar)	325	336	337	342	380	408	445	514	600	580
Thailand	2,012	1,893	2,094	2,349	2,643	2,874	3,351	3,963	4,385	4,231
Timor-Leste	534	548	543	545	1,149	1,869	2,799	2,847	4,358	3,261
Togo	265	266	286	317	357	378	387	430	523	509
Tonga	1,933	1,695	1,833	2,082	2,374	2,593	2,873	2,985	3,326	3,154
Trinidad and Tobago	6,431	6,936	7,050	8,805	10,291	12,323	14,096	16,530	21,188	14,509
Tunisia	2,214	2,255	2,346	2,762	3,113	3,194	3,371	3,778	4,310	4,130
Turkey	4,215	3,054	3,570	4,587	5,855	7,117	7,728	9,309	10,382	8,624
Turkmenistan	1,096	1,484	1,891	2,424	2,588	2,987	3,378	3,807	4,398	4,060
Turks and Caicos Islands	16,923	17,772	16,868	17,502	19,405	21,877	26,116	27,009	29,262	23,248
Tuvalu	1,302	1,356	1,536	1,912	2,241	2,259	2,353	2,768	3,095	2,763
Uganda	285	287	292	299	346	398	422	502	587	594
Ukraine	664	814	918	1,095	1,426	1,907	2,406	3,216	4,087	2,652
United Arab Emirates	34,208	32,106	32,355	34,295	37,180	40,299	42,952	42,914	45,720	32,905
United Kingdom	27,781	27,304	29,637	34,066	39,921	41,656	44,161	50,091	46,615	38,043
United States	36,355	37,166	38,054	39,555	41,818	44,215	46,362	47,994	48,341	46,931
Uruguay	6,872	6,281	4,089	3,622	4,117	5,221	5,878	7,010	9,062	9,415
Uzbekistan	561	376	394	401	472	555	662	841	1,100	1,238
Vanuatu	1,432	1,347	1,362	1,580	1,788	1,886	2,047	2,393	2,698	2,643
Venezuela	4,785	4,928	3,657	3,230	4,273	5,436	6,740	8,325	11,225	11,535
Vietnam	388	403	428	478	593	684	781	903	1,145	1,212
Yemen	611	614	650	700	784	929	1,081	1,181	1,362	1,240
Zambia	340	377	376	429	531	692	1,030	1,103	1,366	1,135
Zimbabwe	604	595	560	525	499	479	465	453	407	594

=== 2010s ===
Country / territory	2010	2011	2012	2013	2014	2015	2016	2017	2018	2019
Afghanistan	535	611	648	629	595	553	525	533	513	512
Albania	4,072	4,428	4,234	4,394	4,556	3,928	4,093	4,492	5,237	5,339
Algeria	4,455	5,420	5,553	5,460	5,454	4,147	3,918	4,080	4,115	4,143
Andorra	42,747	46,657	41,500	42,470	44,370	38,655	40,130	40,673	42,820	41,258
Angola	3,597	4,616	5,086	5,225	5,365	4,127	3,465	4,039	3,238	2,568
Anguilla	20,009	21,570	21,424	21,620	23,028	23,247	22,238	19,333	21,651	25,612
Antigua and Barbuda	14,809	14,844	15,208	15,052	15,534	16,081	16,557	16,924	18,273	18,883
Argentina	10,329	12,704	13,790	14,403	13,180	14,833	12,700	14,533	11,753	9,956
Armenia	3,369	3,700	3,634	3,805	3,973	3,613	3,613	3,955	4,281	4,690
Aruba	24,508	26,122	25,699	26,598	26,998	28,439	28,422	29,248	30,782	31,714
Australia	58,769	68,862	69,651	66,447	62,048	52,010	53,703	57,086	57,921	54,060
Austria	46,602	51,107	48,241	50,296	51,306	43,908	45,055	47,157	51,188	49,881
Azerbaijan	5,784	7,125	7,432	7,803	7,812	5,442	3,837	4,100	4,693	4,765
Bahamas	27,473	27,091	28,552	27,433	28,706	30,289	30,266	31,337	32,124	32,980
Bahrain	21,194	23,847	25,281	25,883	25,432	22,670	22,548	23,936	25,241	26,018
Bangladesh	809	880	926	1,113	1,266	1,435	1,645	1,782	1,934	2,119
Barbados	18,860	19,346	19,034	19,308	19,278	18,954	19,066	19,693	20,056	20,584
Belarus	6,030	6,520	6,941	7,980	8,320	5,951	5,024	5,763	6,332	6,826
Belgium	44,032	47,759	44,872	46,961	47,991	40,890	41,850	44,030	47,481	46,710
Belize	5,465	5,592	5,716	5,954	6,129	6,198	6,184	6,113	6,070	6,227
Benin	973	1,059	1,072	1,169	1,204	1,002	1,011	1,055	1,152	1,131
Bermuda	104,112	99,049	100,213	101,704	100,962	104,855	108,747	111,981	113,205	115,798
Bhutan	2,436	2,788	2,751	2,680	2,849	2,954	3,152	3,435	3,400	3,577
Bolivia	1,930	2,316	2,576	2,870	3,041	2,996	3,036	3,306	3,501	3,504
Bosnia and Herzegovina	4,506	4,983	4,694	5,035	5,206	4,662	4,929	5,345	6,048	6,122
Botswana	6,216	7,287	6,596	6,667	7,122	6,141	6,749	7,105	7,408	7,159
Brazil	11,403	13,397	12,522	12,459	12,275	8,936	8,836	10,081	9,301	9,030
British Virgin Islands	40,381	37,402	36,805	35,705	36,479	37,154	41,495	40,053	40,018	41,589
Brunei	34,938	46,383	46,969	44,003	41,027	30,625	26,663	28,024	30,988	30,427
Bulgaria	6,815	7,816	7,421	7,684	7,902	7,073	7,566	8,362	9,431	9,839
Burkina Faso	625	725	731	760	765	630	664	709	777	765
Burundi	217	230	231	235	251	254	261	287	280	275
Cape Verde	3,579	4,002	3,737	3,961	3,986	3,415	3,609	3,893	4,295	4,381
Cambodia	947	1,092	1,188	1,297	1,432	1,539	1,670	1,809	2,016	2,183
Cameroon	1,399	1,514	1,449	1,576	1,649	1,415	1,442	1,496	1,611	1,555
Canada	47,295	51,897	52,355	52,321	50,675	43,282	42,032	44,807	46,261	46,151
Cayman Islands	76,837	75,281	75,102	75,114	75,845	76,379	77,802	80,054	83,866	88,254
Central African Republic	477	534	544	364	410	366	387	432	455	449
Chad	990	1,153	1,227	1,192	1,234	984	865	854	951	896
Chile	12,636	14,478	15,251	15,675	14,521	13,436	13,647	14,891	15,635	14,490
China	4,504	5,552	6,230	6,940	7,548	7,923	8,001	8,716	9,792	10,031
Colombia	6,398	7,401	8,109	8,279	8,187	6,249	5,960	6,480	6,817	6,473
Comoros	1,387	1,531	1,490	1,603	1,616	1,329	1,365	1,424	1,541	1,519
DR Congo	315	365	400	431	458	468	480	432	524	509
Congo	2,947	3,396	3,732	3,697	3,601	2,439	2,093	2,212	2,694	2,488
Cook Islands	14,184	15,581	16,952	16,427	18,221	17,320	17,878	20,274	21,855	22,121
Costa Rica	8,266	9,276	10,127	10,803	10,911	11,715	12,091	12,317	12,590	12,885
Ivory Coast	1,169	1,246	1,342	1,621	1,888	1,815	1,863	1,964	2,131	2,142
Croatia	14,175	14,884	13,545	14,030	13,939	12,072	12,731	13,869	15,568	15,670
Cuba	5,694	6,151	6,471	6,828	7,147	7,734	8,111	8,611	8,911	9,232
Curaçao	18,797	18,479	18,726	18,598	18,539	18,359	18,028	18,001	16,777	15,965
Cyprus	31,105	32,486	28,992	27,798	27,244	23,486	24,714	26,697	29,600	29,908
Czech Republic	20,180	22,050	20,021	20,266	20,054	17,968	18,815	21,019	23,888	24,329
Denmark	58,103	61,807	58,440	61,373	62,517	53,092	54,499	57,520	61,323	59,402
Djibouti	1,337	1,533	1,764	2,074	2,210	2,376	2,510	2,619	2,718	2,837
Dominica	7,172	7,256	7,031	7,148	7,392	7,680	8,278	7,602	8,138	9,009
Dominican Republic	5,485	5,835	6,026	6,149	6,513	6,820	7,175	7,500	7,935	8,164
Ecuador	4,520	5,154	5,634	6,109	6,406	5,976	5,918	6,233	6,304	6,205
Egypt	2,406	2,537	2,968	2,840	3,086	3,190	2,659	1,983	2,485	3,102
El Salvador	3,040	3,331	3,498	3,582	3,666	3,790	3,901	4,020	4,184	4,320
Equatorial Guinea	13,720	17,198	17,309	16,304	15,549	9,069	7,453	7,809	8,102	6,804
Eritrea	540	689	742	637	841	648	696	604	628	612
Estonia	14,673	17,557	17,569	19,312	20,583	17,733	18,666	20,851	23,618	24,023
Ethiopia	291	327	441	473	536	607	676	700	712	800
Fiji	3,449	4,140	4,341	4,572	5,293	5,098	5,364	5,827	6,085	5,951
Finland	46,506	51,061	47,552	49,690	50,072	42,559	43,450	46,083	49,652	48,357
France	40,394	43,599	40,548	42,339	42,807	36,411	36,729	38,371	41,083	40,090
French Polynesia	22,495	22,832	20,847	21,956	22,259	19,167	19,690	20,827	21,926	21,583
Gabon	8,357	10,219	9,297	9,198	9,201	7,047	6,677	6,922	7,624	7,441
Gambia	801	711	693	654	568	620	650	643	695	738
Georgia	3,190	4,000	4,400	4,599	4,737	4,015	4,073	4,343	4,718	4,647
Germany	42,906	47,303	44,464	46,989	48,734	41,711	42,747	45,282	48,604	47,358
Ghana	1,673	1,995	2,043	2,294	1,954	1,722	1,913	2,013	2,197	2,186
Greece	26,645	25,496	21,618	21,569	21,473	17,981	17,920	18,634	19,877	19,341
Greenland	44,215	47,233	45,963	47,510	50,595	44,610	48,289	50,857	54,496	53,443
Grenada	6,910	6,947	7,093	7,425	7,986	8,694	9,221	9,751	10,083	10,463
Guatemala	2,806	3,170	3,286	3,444	3,689	3,894	4,060	4,325	4,353	4,512
Guinea	659	637	699	748	765	747	712	834	933	1,031
Guinea-Bissau	543	684	599	617	606	587	644	719	743	694
Guyana	4,582	4,947	5,444	5,557	5,473	5,640	5,871	6,179	6,048	6,406
Haiti	1,225	1,305	1,349	1,452	1,441	1,350	1,255	1,411	1,435	1,267
Honduras	1,893	2,074	2,126	2,081	2,180	2,271	2,307	2,413	2,465	2,502
Hong Kong	32,195	34,791	36,471	37,952	39,820	42,000	43,313	45,840	48,417	48,502
Hungary	13,217	14,247	12,955	13,716	14,309	12,729	13,147	14,648	16,491	16,881
Iceland	43,221	47,696	45,978	49,786	54,556	52,930	61,963	71,983	74,424	68,426
India	1,343	1,484	1,455	1,479	1,557	1,617	1,704	1,930	2,010	2,055
Indonesia	3,066	3,579	3,632	3,567	3,441	3,288	3,521	3,799	3,861	4,107
Iran	6,766	8,287	8,170	7,182	5,796	5,050	5,561	5,924	3,680	3,587
Iraq	4,462	5,776	6,478	6,650	6,249	4,440	4,331	4,759	5,647	5,672
Ireland	48,691	52,698	49,405	52,609	57,272	64,305	64,317	72,456	81,161	82,523
Israel	32,668	35,885	34,647	38,515	39,890	37,685	39,213	42,869	44,219	46,311
Italy	35,651	38,215	34,658	35,500	35,824	30,465	31,203	32,633	34,830	33,587
Jamaica	4,810	5,233	5,341	5,124	4,975	5,063	5,010	5,259	5,578	5,607
Japan	44,928	48,660	49,030	40,809	38,412	34,924	39,349	38,806	39,719	40,395
Jordan	3,718	3,947	4,169	4,311	4,191	4,043	3,987	4,066	4,145	4,170
Kazakhstan	8,793	11,287	12,019	13,478	12,428	10,196	7,476	8,943	9,472	9,457
Kenya	1,092	1,096	1,294	1,371	1,483	1,489	1,554	1,667	1,836	1,960
Kiribati	1,522	1,771	1,844	1,772	1,737	1,640	1,743	1,853	1,913	1,751
North Korea	573	642	648	672	702	654	671	691	693	644
South Korea	24,459	26,606	26,922	28,653	30,793	30,190	30,784	33,217	35,326	33,825
Kosovo	2,988	3,539	3,412	3,706	3,911	3,539	3,793	4,061	4,457	4,501
Kuwait	39,212	49,170	52,156	49,652	44,370	29,883	27,324	29,049	32,069	31,709
Kyrgyzstan	873	1,108	1,160	1,265	1,266	1,125	1,140	1,280	1,363	1,443
Laos	1,155	1,386	1,564	1,813	1,981	2,121	2,303	2,432	2,545	2,589
Latvia	11,191	13,013	13,330	14,480	15,183	13,320	13,836	15,130	17,248	17,291
Lebanon	7,626	7,835	8,407	8,162	7,578	7,714	8,090	8,609	9,174	9,189
Lesotho	1,119	1,281	1,218	1,150	1,174	1,121	992	1,069	1,171	1,082
Liberia	341	396	436	483	509	657	674	661	656	627
Libya	11,601	7,594	14,976	11,952	8,926	7,458	7,526	9,966	11,197	9,963
Liechtenstein	156,145	175,024	164,893	173,170	179,142	167,607	165,819	171,052	175,524	167,453
Lithuania	11,831	14,275	14,297	15,649	16,483	14,296	14,977	16,879	19,362	19,721
Luxembourg	110,786	118,971	112,584	120,001	123,688	105,475	106,626	110,164	116,758	112,697
Macau	50,180	64,009	73,521	86,075	89,960	72,404	71,055	77,927	83,778	82,093
Macedonia	4,585	5,143	4,807	5,373	5,687	5,082	5,442	5,826	6,607	6,643
Madagascar	450	506	494	515	506	445	454	492	500	500
Malawi	469	551	402	379	437	481	406	496	533	581
Malaysia	8,899	10,217	10,601	10,714	11,013	9,649	9,477	9,863	10,902	10,920
Maldives	7,174	7,425	7,461	8,236	8,939	9,645	9,948	10,510	11,423	11,740
Mali	670	789	734	758	797	705	731	776	835	820
Malta	21,524	23,054	22,525	25,200	27,361	25,486	26,415	30,266	33,337	32,415
Marshall Islands	3,080	3,305	3,498	3,660	3,719	3,750	4,207	4,571	4,843	5,274
Mauritania	1,660	1,931	1,859	1,934	1,713	1,555	1,566	1,615	1,723	1,767
Mauritius	7,799	8,955	9,051	9,522	10,119	9,292	9,749	10,625	11,433	11,223
Mexico	9,729	10,664	10,744	11,217	11,391	10,021	9,098	9,649	10,085	10,370
Federated States of Micronesia	2,916	3,220	3,496	3,481	3,579	3,550	3,768	3,957	4,161	4,115
Moldova	1,920	2,365	2,501	2,786	2,813	2,372	2,465	2,979	3,568	3,771
Monaco	161,855	179,364	165,446	184,941	195,694	170,437	173,605	170,663	188,298	193,747
Mongolia	2,661	3,792	4,397	4,412	4,197	3,904	3,677	3,698	4,160	4,395
Montenegro	6,554	7,183	6,452	7,053	7,276	6,455	7,012	7,832	8,943	9,061
Montserrat	11,579	13,210	13,228	12,515	12,514	13,135	13,548	12,963	13,590	14,821
Morocco	2,970	3,222	3,117	3,383	3,483	3,190	3,186	3,344	3,553	3,560
Mozambique	496	618	686	687	697	611	441	471	518	519
Myanmar	845	1,171	1,224	1,236	1,308	1,224	1,234	1,243	1,325	1,364
Namibia	5,418	5,835	5,943	5,347	5,378	4,774	4,396	5,141	5,309	4,732
Nauru	5,902	8,706	11,740	11,237	12,365	9,526	10,328	11,346	12,719	12,138
Nepal	672	767	749	759	827	851	869	1,051	1,130	1,206
Netherlands	50,829	54,189	49,996	52,098	52,939	45,345	46,334	48,987	53,368	52,967
New Caledonia	35,799	38,836	35,560	36,671	37,817	30,859	30,797	32,352	34,903	33,411
New Zealand	33,699	38,400	39,942	42,864	44,514	38,601	40,065	42,921	43,227	42,660
Nicaragua	1,527	1,680	1,785	1,835	1,958	2,074	2,132	2,183	2,035	1,959
Niger	462	501	514	548	567	486	503	522	577	563
Nigeria	2,249	2,444	2,648	2,877	3,095	2,622	2,070	1,876	2,058	2,265
Norway	88,165	101,224	102,178	103,544	97,664	74,793	70,848	76,134	82,795	76,433
Oman	23,570	25,188	24,642	23,458	23,161	18,808	17,110	17,820	19,902	19,180
Pakistan	972	1,122	1,152	1,167	1,290	1,363	1,419	1,510	1,418	1,265
Palau	9,960	10,747	11,988	12,720	13,727	15,782	16,803	16,035	15,992	15,841
Palestine	2,410	2,718	2,896	3,132	3,168	3,090	3,325	3,401	3,356	3,456
Panama	8,193	9,514	10,931	12,155	13,122	14,019	14,799	15,678	16,146	16,464
Papua New Guinea	1,867	2,288	2,635	2,561	2,723	2,485	2,316	2,478	2,566	2,576
Paraguay	4,728	5,802	5,646	6,461	6,652	5,879	5,775	6,152	6,258	5,821
Peru	5,072	5,861	6,519	6,747	6,667	6,232	6,217	6,736	6,978	7,036
Philippines	2,163	2,384	2,615	2,781	2,867	2,910	2,985	3,038	3,169	3,401
Poland	12,550	13,815	13,024	13,544	14,168	12,545	12,369	13,811	15,549	15,766
Portugal	22,540	23,248	20,597	21,674	22,110	19,193	19,940	21,379	23,446	23,215
Puerto Rico	26,483	27,242	27,853	28,405	28,734	29,353	30,016	30,679	30,686	31,972
Qatar	73,204	92,645	97,966	97,768	92,962	66,633	58,373	59,518	66,398	63,037
Romania	8,323	9,497	8,885	9,460	10,002	8,952	9,369	10,673	12,423	12,905
Russia	10,698	14,203	15,304	15,853	14,209	9,383	8,758	10,768	11,318	11,554
Rwanda	593	651	706	705	724	734	729	758	772	810
Samoa	3,620	4,000	3,942	4,026	4,089	4,091	4,276	4,292	4,307	4,350
San Marino	69,927	63,932	53,799	55,489	54,775	41,869	42,983	44,465	47,941	46,640
São Tomé and Príncipe	1,086	1,256	1,333	1,568	1,773	1,589	1,706	1,829	1,976	2,018
Saudi Arabia	20,996	25,919	27,413	26,898	26,436	22,335	21,681	23,227	27,880	27,518
Senegal	1,276	1,375	1,327	1,380	1,399	1,218	1,266	1,357	1,453	1,431
Serbia	5,655	6,686	5,914	6,651	6,512	5,525	5,710	6,246	7,214	7,395
Seychelles	10,382	10,714	10,908	13,386	13,259	13,358	14,283	14,902	15,511	15,884
Sierra Leone	414	461	580	733	729	675	670	705	846	844
Singapore	47,234	53,907	55,748	57,111	57,690	55,743	57,199	61,251	66,892	66,478
Sint Maarten	26,528	27,317	30,443	33,371	36,494	36,481	36,650	33,063	31,709	36,147
Slovakia	16,898	18,470	17,526	18,323	18,783	16,453	16,647	17,657	19,586	19,419
Slovenia	23,375	24,990	22,484	23,277	24,055	20,733	21,486	23,348	25,943	25,875
Solomon Islands	1,685	1,924	2,066	2,161	2,165	2,045	2,083	2,144	2,278	2,224
Somalia	219	235	324	382	435	480	515	553	509	540
South Africa	7,973	8,646	8,077	7,328	6,852	6,108	5,651	6,613	6,914	6,534
South Sudan	1,531	1,671	825	1,140	1,330	636	946	303	348	375
Spain	30,486	31,652	28,308	29,069	29,543	25,837	26,598	28,201	30,400	29,588
Sri Lanka	2,808	3,225	3,328	3,605	3,830	3,918	4,017	4,273	4,246	3,972
Saint Kitts and Nevis	16,623	17,832	17,549	18,588	20,242	20,329	21,388	22,465	22,901	23,595
Saint Lucia	8,556	9,131	9,260	9,577	10,045	10,335	10,638	11,333	11,643	11,794
Saint Vincent and the Grenadines	6,552	6,528	6,714	7,072	7,169	7,354	7,657	7,988	8,428	8,741
Sudan	1,546	1,890	1,687	1,692	2,011	2,097	2,362	2,858	1,093	771
Suriname	8,150	8,226	9,237	9,519	9,670	8,814	5,644	6,050	6,666	7,024
Swaziland	3,993	4,312	4,348	4,069	3,892	3,552	3,320	3,803	3,994	3,810
Sweden	52,542	60,379	57,749	60,843	59,582	51,196	51,819	53,300	54,181	51,772
Switzerland	76,523	90,454	85,814	87,284	88,708	83,791	82,138	82,237	85,196	84,105
Syria	2,731	2,941	2,058	1,247	1,156	1,039	704	909	1,174	1,391
Tajikistan	737	834	961	1,053	1,125	957	789	829	834	871
Tanzania (mainland)	732	768	861	962	1,021	937	951	984	981	1,022
Tanzania (Zanzibar)	732	768	861	962	1,021	937	951	984	981	1,022
Thailand	4,974	5,374	5,726	6,018	5,801	5,689	5,834	6,413	7,100	7,606
Timor-Leste	813	939	1,023	1,205	1,225	1,324	1,345	1,277	1,227	1,558
Togo	705	784	762	827	856	751	773	793	851	826
Tonga	3,457	4,083	3,914	4,124	4,059	3,805	3,991	4,375	4,550	4,641
Trinidad and Tobago	16,854	19,261	19,338	20,218	20,740	18,781	16,440	16,501	16,245	15,885
Tunisia	4,092	4,258	4,188	4,300	4,428	4,015	3,848	3,619	3,628	3,529
Turkey	10,593	11,302	11,710	12,536	12,032	10,802	10,651	10,339	9,228	8,915
Turkmenistan	4,059	5,144	6,054	6,600	7,164	5,800	5,687	5,828	6,125	6,648
Turks and Caicos Islands	23,094	23,627	22,634	22,412	23,996	25,736	26,946	25,615	26,785	27,740
Tuvalu	2,958	3,548	3,402	3,410	3,422	3,301	3,775	4,167	4,469	5,118
Uganda	948	852	898	664	1,071	804	786	786	820	878
Ukraine	2,928	3,523	3,804	3,974	2,904	1,988	2,047	2,467	2,895	3,423
United Arab Emirates	43,265	50,120	51,301	51,101	50,275	42,685	40,888	42,290	45,689	44,572
United Kingdom	39,448	41,944	42,324	43,250	47,247	44,782	40,810	40,393	43,018	42,488
United States	48,379	49,664	51,256	52,734	54,495	56,098	57,127	59,036	61,651	63,767
Uruguay	12,139	14,617	15,800	17,924	18,021	16,948	17,010	19,185	19,250	18,316
Uzbekistan	1,762	2,099	2,321	2,462	2,675	2,803	2,753	1,951	1,633	1,829
Vanuatu	2,815	3,163	3,005	2,980	2,973	2,855	2,956	3,160	3,207	3,207
Venezuela	13,668	10,844	12,901	12,414	12,001	11,240	9,355	8,083	6,815	5,158
Vietnam	1,683	1,951	2,185	2,360	2,546	2,578	2,735	2,956	3,222	3,441
Yemen	1,155	1,127	1,128	1,186	1,099	797	583	556	782	370
Zambia	1,451	1,696	1,666	1,726	1,679	1,272	1,218	1,485	1,464	1,259
Zimbabwe	902	1,037	1,239	1,362	1,372	1,386	1,407	1,488	1,573	1,480

=== 2020s ===
Country / territory	2020	2021	2022	2023
Afghanistan	511	379	349	396
Albania	5,280	6,292	6,690	8,172
Algeria	3,610	4,161	4,962	5,364
Andorra	37,361	42,426	42,414	46,812
Angola	1,639	2,024	3,180	2,464
Anguilla	17,609	21,087	27,431	28,850
Antigua and Barbuda	15,360	17,342	20,118	21,787
Argentina	8,536	10,738	13,936	14,187
Armenia	4,373	4,835	6,774	8,228
Aruba	23,109	27,236	30,426	33,802
Australia	55,759	67,441	67,972	67,129
Austria	48,692	53,581	52,045	56,042
Azerbaijan	4,193	5,357	7,655	7,012
Bahamas	25,156	28,682	33,044	35,896
Bahrain	23,298	26,115	28,936	28,453
Bangladesh	2,246	2,475	2,556	2,464
Barbados	18,347	18,697	22,164	23,804
Belarus	6,563	7,531	8,042	7,883
Belgium	45,900	51,724	50,975	55,049
Belize	5,259	6,154	7,051	7,489
Benin	1,200	1,319	1,266	1,394
Bermuda	106,973	112,757	120,897	125,842
Bhutan	3,192	3,571	3,711	3,839
Bolivia	3,100	3,385	3,644	3,686
Bosnia and Herzegovina	6,130	7,295	7,656	8,639
Botswana	6,311	7,808	8,329	7,820
Brazil	7,074	7,973	9,281	10,378
British Virgin Islands	38,474	38,618	38,394	38,627
Brunei	26,834	31,007	36,633	32,963
Bulgaria	10,175	12,274	13,260	15,068
Burkina Faso	825	896	836	883
Burundi	274	289	329	289
Cape Verde	3,539	3,971	4,432	4,961
Cambodia	2,058	2,130	2,303	2,458
Cameroon	1,556	1,672	1,605	1,737
Canada	43,374	52,204	55,678	54,517
Cayman Islands	82,339	86,438	92,202	97,583
Central African Republic	463	492	467	496
Chad	849	895	881	913
Chile	13,106	16,223	15,451	17,068
China	10,299	12,493	12,547	12,509
Colombia	5,340	6,223	6,675	6,948
Comoros	1,526	1,584	1,553	1,703
DR Congo	472	533	607	655
Congo	1,994	2,271	2,309	2,291
Cook Islands	18,116	16,268	19,680	25,750
Costa Rica	12,394	12,838	13,626	16,942
Ivory Coast	2,180	2,456	2,309	2,528
Croatia	14,621	17,612	18,212	21,661
Cuba	9,605	11,391	13,302	18,329
Curaçao	13,698	14,783	16,592	17,697
Cyprus	28,778	33,898	34,239	37,077
Czech Republic	23,802	27,631	28,279	31,750
Denmark	60,984	69,727	68,093	68,440
Djibouti	2,878	3,020	3,232	3,469
Dominica	7,497	8,263	9,090	9,786
Dominican Republic	7,162	8,472	10,110	10,718
Ecuador	5,464	6,076	6,541	6,610
Egypt	3,571	3,838	3,634	2,895
El Salvador	3,997	4,643	5,094	5,391
Equatorial Guinea	5,764	6,946	7,478	6,558
Eritrea	642	660	699	656
Estonia	23,931	27,937	28,425	30,201
Ethiopia	813	813	949	1,241
Fiji	4,844	4,696	5,405	5,889
Finland	48,828	53,099	50,319	52,762
France	38,881	43,438	40,830	44,451
French Polynesia	20,746	21,983	20,739	22,759
Gabon	6,606	8,181	8,409	8,071
Gambia	720	795	836	890
Georgia	4,219	4,975	6,584	8,020
Germany	47,115	51,953	49,516	53,528
Ghana	2,197	2,446	2,240	2,260
Greece	17,885	20,634	21,021	23,772
Greenland	54,973	57,740	52,261	54,374
Grenada	8,969	9,622	10,474	11,246
Guatemala	4,478	4,914	5,358	5,763
Guinea	1,054	1,186	1,390	1,597
Guinea-Bissau	694	768	749	855
Guyana	6,779	9,865	17,913	20,189
Haiti	1,472	1,674	1,630	1,705
Honduras	2,308	2,735	3,003	3,232
Hong Kong	46,052	49,295	48,042	51,166
Hungary	16,254	18,879	18,337	21,954
Iceland	58,999	69,303	75,640	80,827
India	1,910	2,257	2,405	2,487
Indonesia	3,854	4,287	4,731	4,876
Iran	3,727	4,048	4,446	4,432
Iraq	4,296	4,822	5,995	5,149
Ireland	87,616	105,661	107,352	106,106
Israel	46,952	55,082	57,968	55,488
Italy	31,838	36,485	35,274	38,672
Jamaica	4,879	5,165	6,022	6,840
Japan	40,027	40,059	34,052	33,806
Jordan	4,022	4,183	4,322	4,442
Kazakhstan	8,782	9,984	11,255	13,000
Kenya	1,928	2,061	2,110	1,952
Kiribati	1,752	2,222	2,070	2,178
North Korea	623	656	592	640
South Korea	33,631	37,461	34,748	35,538
Kosovo	4,416	5,405	5,453	6,157
Kuwait	25,237	34,044	40,078	33,832
Kyrgyzstan	1,241	1,356	1,745	1,977
Laos	2,602	2,559	2,032	1,958
Latvia	17,558	20,251	20,211	22,444
Lebanon	4,056	4,315	4,647	4,757
Lesotho	919	1,067	1,030	916
Liberia	672	784	849	917
Libya	6,650	4,936	5,987	6,027
Liechtenstein	165,219	202,659	187,658	201,150
Lithuania	20,535	23,989	25,217	27,956
Luxembourg	116,872	133,668	124,966	128,936
Macau	37,103	44,599	35,492	64,158
Macedonia	6,603	7,563	7,571	8,606
Madagascar	451	483	504	509
Malawi	603	617	607	598
Malaysia	9,958	10,904	11,731	11,377
Maldives	7,394	10,176	11,786	12,530
Mali	804	862	814	869
Malta	31,673	37,600	36,417	41,676
Marshall Islands	5,660	6,274	6,582	6,952
Mauritania	1,796	1,948	1,960	2,121
Mauritius	8,890	8,975	10,131	11,304
Mexico	8,841	10,314	11,402	13,826
Federated States of Micronesia	4,016	4,422	4,450	4,708
Moldova	3,757	4,528	4,778	5,393
Monaco	176,892	223,823	226,052	256,581
Mongolia	4,046	4,577	5,064	5,790
Montenegro	7,864	9,705	10,149	11,885
Montserrat	14,829	15,750	16,228	18,197
Morocco	3,317	3,843	3,508	3,830
Mozambique	462	510	578	623
Myanmar	1,508	1,828	1,212	1,147
Namibia	3,879	4,413	4,349	4,168
Nauru	12,710	17,430	14,406	14,812
Nepal	1,134	1,250	1,338	1,363
Netherlands	52,876	59,472	58,452	63,803
New Caledonia	33,270	35,312	33,516	34,981
New Zealand	41,953	49,659	47,962	48,750
Nicaragua	1,932	2,129	2,325	2,613
Niger	579	609	610	643
Nigeria	2,009	2,009	2,129	1,646
Norway	68,343	93,077	108,805	87,932
Oman	16,785	19,403	23,224	20,972
Pakistan	1,250	1,431	1,335	1,212
Palau	14,557	13,257	14,392	15,899
Palestine	3,064	3,492	3,613	3,216
Panama	13,297	15,512	17,388	18,701
Papua New Guinea	2,430	2,608	3,098	2,986
Paraguay	5,365	5,977	6,206	6,276
Peru	6,133	6,827	7,363	7,907
Philippines	3,228	3,484	3,548	3,805
Poland	15,874	18,117	18,122	20,876
Portugal	22,141	24,642	24,661	27,718
Puerto Rico	31,483	32,714	35,041	36,367
Qatar	51,513	63,848	81,491	71,499
Romania	12,996	14,889	15,462	18,348
Russia	10,201	12,640	15,582	13,809
Rwanda	779	829	975	1,010
Samoa	3,912	4,010	3,982	4,765
San Marino	44,428	53,668	53,731	58,917
São Tomé and Príncipe	2,191	2,380	2,408	2,963
Saudi Arabia	23,693	27,903	34,454	32,094
Senegal	1,461	1,598	1,565	1,682
Serbia	7,724	9,231	9,360	11,101
Seychelles	11,494	12,092	16,395	16,735
Sierra Leone	845	885	860	758
Singapore	62,185	78,271	88,227	86,616
Sint Maarten	30,245	33,308	37,230	39,237
Slovakia	19,749	22,156	21,181	24,086
Slovenia	25,392	29,113	28,332	32,642
Solomon Islands	2,063	1,997	2,005	2,042
Somalia	518	549	573	597
South Africa	5,586	6,831	6,497	5,976
South Sudan	412	393	395	395
Spain	27,051	30,611	30,244	33,814
Sri Lanka	3,743	3,903	3,266	3,673
Saint Kitts and Nevis	18,859	18,361	21,012	22,625
Saint Lucia	8,411	10,459	13,104	13,555
Saint Vincent and the Grenadines	8,351	8,641	9,694	10,767
Sudan	733	732	756	680
Suriname	6,792	5,386	5,811	5,976
Swaziland	3,339	3,801	3,702	3,717
Sweden	52,653	61,173	55,295	55,439
Switzerland	85,862	93,638	94,232	100,831
Syria	1,009	1,526	1,574	1,230
Tajikistan	834	897	1,052	1,161
Tanzania (mainland)	1,069	1,112	1,172	1,209
Tanzania (Zanzibar)	1,069	1,112	1,172	1,209
Thailand	6,986	7,058	6,909	7,182
Timor-Leste	1,631	2,685	2,343	1,503
Togo	863	951	909	997
Tonga	4,722	4,941	4,814	4,859
Trinidad and Tobago	14,174	16,251	19,059	16,960
Tunisia	3,553	3,875	3,680	3,979
Turkey	8,367	9,458	10,420	12,814
Turkmenistan	6,593	7,051	7,820	8,132
Turks and Caicos Islands	20,831	23,115	26,802	30,349
Tuvalu	4,977	6,124	6,359	6,880
Uganda	856	933	1,002	1,049
Ukraine	3,505	4,510	3,946	4,737
United Arab Emirates	36,987	42,413	49,085	48,311
United Kingdom	40,040	46,452	45,674	49,224
United States	62,911	69,618	76,147	80,706
Uruguay	15,790	17,888	20,690	22,796
Uzbekistan	1,793	2,033	2,322	2,549
Vanuatu	3,043	3,212	3,375	3,492
Venezuela	3,722	3,960	4,586	4,925
Vietnam	3,534	3,704	4,116	4,282
Yemen	261	243	287	222
Zambia	948	1,128	1,446	1,331
Zimbabwe	1,395	1,527	1,644	1,858

== Centre for Economics and Business Research estimate for 2040 ==
The following table is a nominal GDP per capita estimate for the top 190 largest economies in 2040 made by British think tank Centre for Economics and Business Research in December 2025. Total GDP figures have been divided by UN population projections for the year 2040.

Largest economies by GDP per capita in 2040
Country	GDP per capita	GDP (billions USD)	Population
Luxembourg	204,064	179	762,757
Ireland	195,979	1,234	5,672,630
Switzerland	165,672	1,639	9,306,308
Singapore	156,744	1,058	6,352,645
United States	144,627	52,852	362,685,952
Qatar	141,226	500	3,474,059
Macau	134,158	105	658,829
Norway	129,409	806	5,795,898
Iceland	126,638	63	418,311
Denmark	114,557	751	6,096,822
Netherlands	110,539	2,142	18,679,362
United Arab Emirates	108,217	1,412	13,470,551
Australia	100,419	3,289	30,668,762
Hong Kong	96,925	758	6,841,257
Malta	95,935	66	572,532
Austria	95,152	894	9,395,494
San Marino	94,760	3.4	34,370
Germany	94,098	7,783	79,497,160
Finland	92,280	516	5,438,792
Belgium	89,469	1,106	11,943,662
United Kingdom	89,100	6,784	73,484,672
Sweden	87,303	1,019	10,987,637
Canada	83,873	3,818	44,110,976
Israel	81,360	1,063	12,238,294
Cyprus	81,356	83	1,484,849
New Zealand	78,714	476	5,658,654
Guyana	78,685	67	907,506
Lithuania	74,238	193	2,506,043
France	73,203	5,203	69,385,936
Slovenia	71,651	153	2,044,485
Estonia	70,552	92	1,249,939
Taiwan	67,113	1,521	23,000,000
Aruba	66,500	7.2	104,278
Italy	66,178	3,771	54,601,860
South Korea	65,229	3,297	48,574,336
Brunei	65,045	34	505,976
Puerto Rico	64,133	198	2,783,742
Spain	62,073	3,373	47,209,992
Czech Republic	61,188	630	10,286,990
Saudi Arabia	60,597	2,890	44,045,372
Andorra	60,265	7.1	85,668
Latvia	58,798	103	1,636,175
Bahamas	58,107	27	420,346
Croatia	56,215	209	3,474,467
Portugal	55,999	588	10,274,446
Slovakia	55,650	289	5,102,848
Poland	53,357	1,828	33,297,892
Japan	52,208	5,922	111,581,160
Bahrain	49,676	106	1,914,988
Greece	48,913	484	9,660,546
Kuwait	48,309	322	5,756,196
Hungary	45,125	413	8,939,447
Romania	44,608	764	17,202,350
Uruguay	44,151	152	3,336,459
Barbados	43,490	13.0	276,346
Seychelles	43,432	5.1	131,930
Palau	42,798	0.7	16,602
Panama	40,804	218	5,286,592
Saint Kitts and Nevis	40,492	2.2	46,313
Bulgaria	40,424	221	5,611,630
Costa Rica	37,726	226	5,369,806
Argentina	37,599	2,009	47,817,645
Serbia	36,411	213	5,834,853
China	35,375	47,877	1,327,848,192
Maldives	34,969	17	564,798
Antigua and Barbuda	33,401	4.1	97,133
Trinidad and Tobago	31,501	48	1,338,552
Oman	30,078	260	6,931,974
Montenegro	29,118	18	558,057
Dominican Republic	28,302	347	12,579,320
Georgia	27,856	102	3,622,271
Mauritius	27,755	34	1,179,759
Chile	27,471	597	20,542,103
Kazakhstan	27,243	650	24,246,823
Malaysia	26,674	1,060	41,509,644
Albania	26,353	62	2,050,130
Grenada	24,299	3.0	116,493
Armenia	23,905	69	2,732,210
Russia	23,469	3,247	138,213,600
Saint Lucia	22,921	4.5	179,293
Marshall Islands	22,558	0.6	26,597
Turkey	22,454	2,053	88,876,672
Mexico	21,988	3,268	144,624,323
North Macedonia	21,902	36	1,640,264
Saint Vincent and the Grenadines	21,876	2.4	92,650
Moldova	20,350	39	1,992,135
Suriname	19,696	15.7	707,160
Bosnia and Herzegovina	19,247	62	2,745,010
Nauru	18,879	0.3	14,039
Dominica	18,502	1.4	63,799
Kosovo	18,214	28	1,583,747
Brazil	17,644	3,943	219,237,084
Turkmenistan	15,994	127	8,932,231
Mongolia	15,731	66	4,147,692
Thailand	14,774	1,037	69,535,002
Botswana	14,354	50	3,126,640
Peru	14,335	572	38,794,649
Colombia	14,009	827	58,576,446
Gabon	13,865	44	3,452,988
Cape Verde	13,791	7.7	557,374
Belarus	13,529	113	8,120,727
Jamaica	13,048	36	2,676,100
Indonesia	12,955	4,182	311,797,395
Fiji	12,832	12.9	983,858
Azerbaijan	12,634	152	10,918,934
Paraguay	12,578	104	8,087,572
Vietnam	12,559	1,407	108,437,635
Ukraine	12,319	435	35,270,911
Ecuador	12,064	246	20,434,220
Bhutan	12,051	10.6	862,129
Guatemala	11,918	271	22,626,870
Libya	11,910	97	8,651,417
Philippines	11,340	1,500	129,546,659
Belize	11,009	5.7	491,595
El Salvador	10,821	74	6,640,752
Iraq	10,948	699	62,223,211
Djibouti	10,795	13.6	1,406,635
Tuvalu	10,240	0.1	9,140
Western Samoa	9,821	2.3	247,196
Tonga	9,292	0.9	102,565
Algeria	9,125	526	54,873,476
Morocco	9,095	389	42,168,205
Equatorial Guinea	9,068	22	2,665,586
South Africa	8,856	693	74,035,624
Jordan	8,715	115	14,471,297
India	8,498	14,092	1,622,580,039
Sri Lanka	8,019	201	23,159,442
Federated States of Micronesia	7,917	0.8	121,681
Eswatini	7,661	10.6	1,429,781
Namibia	7,179	29	3,962,405
Bangladesh	7,177	1,448	202,589,429
Uzbekistan	6,753	342	46,044,152
Cambodia	6,481	131	20,540,682
Ivory Coast	6,480	318	45,743,925
Tunisia	6,267	85	12,953,864
Honduras	6,243	87	13,484,653
Iran	5,913	594	99,524,277
Egypt	5,942	869	145,213,654
Kyrgyzstan	5,695	54	8,786,095
São Tomé and Príncipe	5,232	1.7	315,842
Nicaragua	5,065	42	8,189,914
Kenya	4,960	343	74,108,863
Bolivia	4,645	70	14,899,397
Ghana	4,408	201	44,568,350
Nepal	3,972	119	32,909,537
Papua New Guinea	3,947	68	13,376,160
Mauritania	3,908	26	7,681,908
Vanuatu	3,892	2.2	451,512
Kiribati	3,645	0.6	164,700
Guinea	3,540	80	20,160,750
Congo	3,480	33	9,083,971
Solomon Islands	3,445	3.7	1,135,455
Senegal	3,173	89	25,797,510
Ethiopia	3,158	461	188,450,902
Zimbabwe	3,156	74	22,250,109
Cameroon	3,142	141	42,208,003
Benin	3,104	70	20,445,760
Angola	3,063	197	58,965,321
Tajikistan	2,969	39	13,713,947
Laos	2,957	28	9,169,002
Rwanda	2,881	55	19,440,770
Timor-Leste	2,841	4.9	1,718,249
Comoros	2,802	3.5	1,133,778
Tanzania	2,653	275	103,999,359
Uganda	2,611	202	72,020,418
Pakistan	2,576	812	324,937,697
Togo	2,219	31	13,121,352
Haiti	2,131	32	13,733,853
Zambia	2,130	68	31,550,402
Nigeria	2,125	688	312,710,416
Guinea-Bissau	2,092	5.7	2,969,702
Myanmar	1,844	108	58,169,858
Liberia	1,798	14.1	7,681,688
Burkina Faso	1,784	60	32,193,645
Mali	1,714	67	37,413,643
Chad	1,685	49	31,307,342
Gambia	1,576	6.6	3,732,798
Sierra Leone	1,520	18	11,398,400
Somalia	1,424	37	29,896,287
Niger	1,349	66	42,316,740
Lesotho	1,335	3.8	2,757,876
DR Congo	1,178	202	172,595,582
Sudan	1,159	85	71,730,599
Mozambique	1,119	60	52,124,215
Madagascar	1,021	47	44,846,895
Central African Republic	766	6.9	8,526,455
Malawi	576	21	31,302,098
Burundi	489	10.7	20,131,318
Yemen	408	25	59,181,526
South Sudan	335	7.8	16,101,480

== Other sources 1965 ==
GDP (nominal) per capita in 1965 based on a West-German school book (published in 1971).

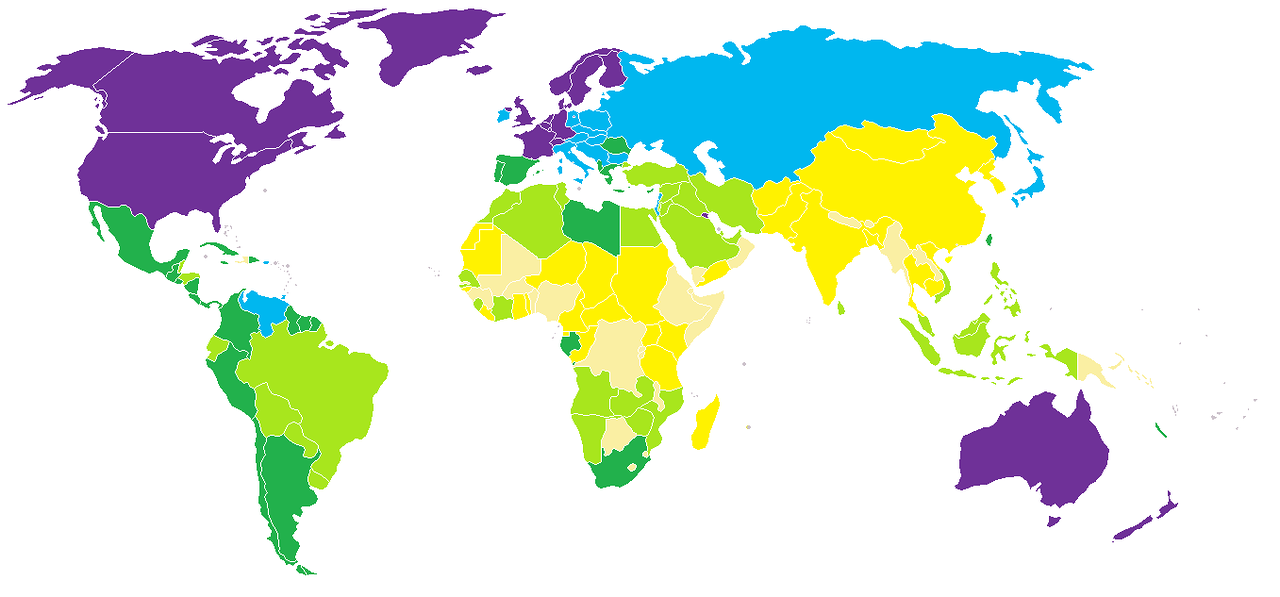

> 5,000 DM 2,500–5,000 DM 1,000–2,500 DM	500–1,000 DM 250–500 DM < 250 DM

== See also ==
- List of countries by GDP (nominal)
- List of countries by GDP (nominal) per capita
- List of countries by past and projected GDP (nominal)
- List of countries by GDP (PPP)
- List of countries by GDP (PPP) per capita
- List of countries by past and projected GDP (PPP)
- List of countries by past and projected GDP (PPP) per capita

== Sources ==
- International Monetary Fund (IMF), World Economic Outlook (WEO) database, October 2026 edition, gross domestic product (nominal) per capita, current prices, (millions of) U.S. dollars.
