= List of Oceanian countries by GDP =

Australia is the largest economy in Oceania, comprising over 85% of the continent's gross domestic product (nominal).
1. Australia (85.6%)
2. New Zealand (12.3%)
3. Papua New Guinea (1.50%)
4. Other (0.60%)

This is a list of Oceanian countries ranked by nominal Gross Domestic Product (GDP). Countries are sorted by their 2024 GDP (PPP) estimates based on data from the World Economic Outlook, which is released biannually by the International Monetary Fund.

Each country's GDP per capita is also included as well as the Purchasing Power Parity (PPP) equivalents for both measures.

== GDP statistics for Oceanian countries ==
Country	GDP US Dollars ($mil)	GDP per capita US Dollars	PPP Int'l Dollars ($mil)	PPP per capita Int'l Dollars
Australia	2,123,963	75,648	2,098,888	74,755
New Zealand	278,636	52,023	312,297	58,308
Papua New Guinea	34,403	2,632	52,105	3,986
Fiji	6,802	6,447	16,070	17,209
Solomon Islands	1,836	2,258	2,190	2,694
Vanuatu	1,396	4,085	1,402	4,100
Samoa	1,376	6,455	1,897	8,894
Tonga	716	7,238	840	8,488
Federated States of Micronesia	521	5,514	478	5,052
Kiribati	401	3,051	515	3,921
Palau	377	21,571	361	20,641
Marshall Islands	342	9,677	301	8,504
Nauru	196	16,053	150	12,323
Tuvalu	65	6,581	64	6,447

== See also ==
- List of countries by GDP (PPP)
- List of countries by GDP (PPP) per capita
- List of countries by GDP (nominal)
- List of countries by GDP (nominal) per capita
