= GDP density =

Measure of economic activity per a given unit of area

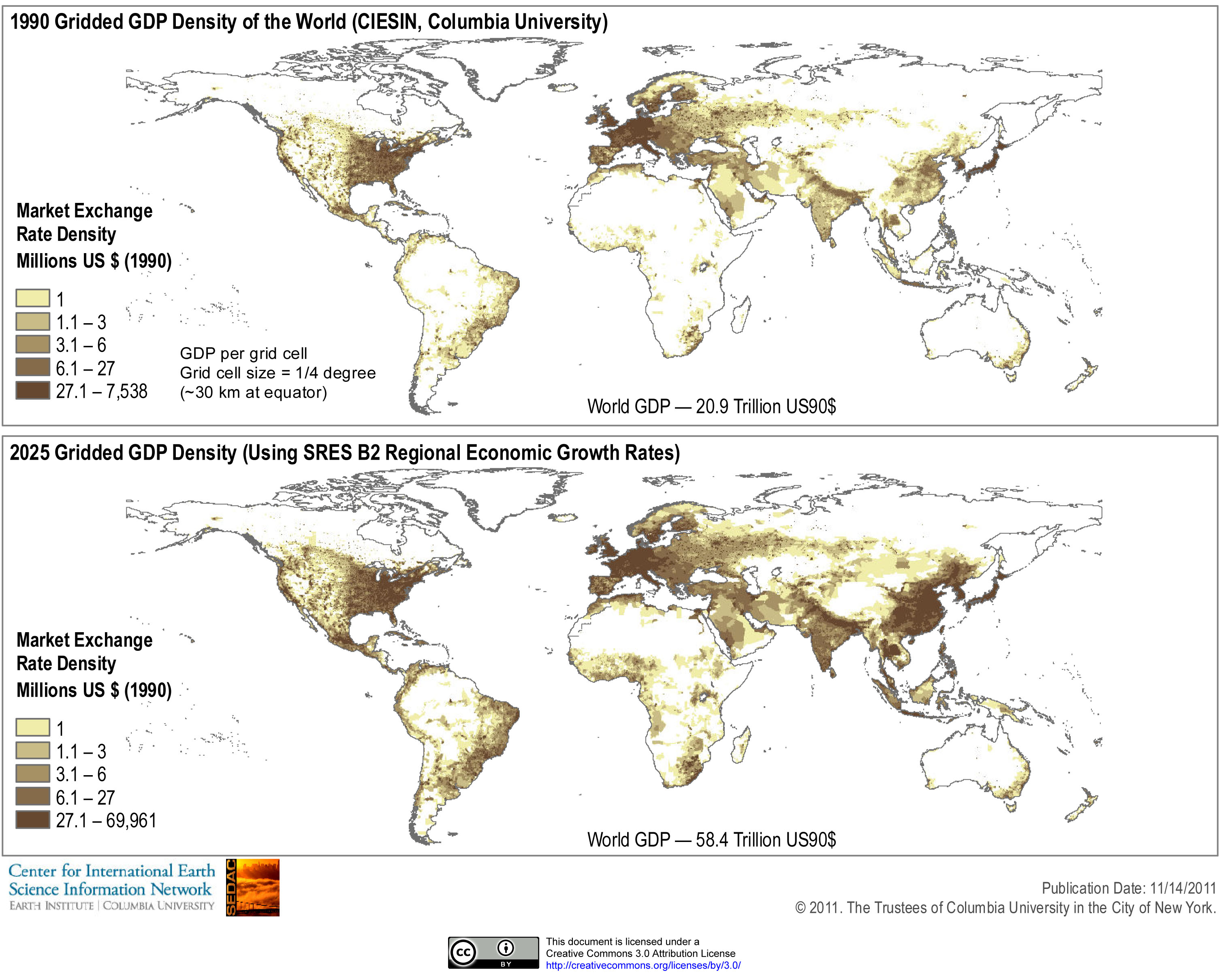
Gridded GDP density of the world (1990 and 2011)

GDP density is a measure of economic activity by area. It is expressed as gross domestic product per square kilometer and can be calculated by multiplying GDP per capita of an area by the population density of that area. Amongst other uses it demonstrates the effects of geography on economy.

== GDP density ==
=== What is GDP density? ===
GDP density refers to the distribution or intensity of Gross Domestic Product (GDP) within a particular area or population. GDP density could be interpreted as a measure of economic activity or output relative to the size of a region or population, often expressed as GDP per capita or GDP per unit of area.

==== GDP per capita ====
The GDP per capita is a commonly utilized indicator to assess a nation's economic performance. It is calculated by dividing the total value of products and services produced in a nation during a given time period by the average population of that nation. This measure, which is frequently used to compare the economic success of various countries, sheds light on the average economic output per person in a specific nation. GDP per capita typically denotes a higher standard of life because it shows that the nation's citizens have more resources and GDP density.

==== GDP per unit area ====
GDP per unit area refers to the geographical distribution of Gross Domestic Product within a country. It analyzes how economic output is spread across different regions, provinces, states, or territories within a nation. Understanding GDP geographic distribution is essential for policymakers, businesses, and researchers as it provides insights into regional disparities in economic development and helps identify areas that may require targeted interventions or investment. Policymakers can identify economically underperforming regions and may need to implement tailored policies to promote growth and development by analyzing the geographic distribution of GDP. By identifying the areas of concentrated economic activity, it also assists firms in making well-informed decisions regarding the allocation of resources and market prospects. Additionally, trends of urbanization, economic resiliency, and regional growth are studied by scholars using geographic GDP density data.

== Fluctuations in GDP density ==
Academic discussions have highlighted two significant reasons why typical households might not benefit proportionally from economic growth. These reasons revolve around discrepancies between GDP per capita and median household income, shedding light on challenges in accurately measuring and interpreting economic indicators. The first reason centers on differences in measurement between GDP per capita, derived from national accounts, and median household income, based on household surveys. Despite efforts by organizations like the OECD and EU to align income measures with national accounts concepts, disparities persist due to methodological variations and mismeasurement. Empirical studies reveal substantial disparities between mean per capita income from national accounts and household surveys across various countries. The second reason gaining attention is the widening income inequality, where a significant portion of national income growth concentrates at the top of the income distribution. This trend results in minimal increases in the median income. Empirical studies, primarily focused on countries like the USA and the UK, underscore the impact of income inequality on household income dynamics.

=== Effect on poverty levels ===
Geographical detectors have been used, especially in rural poverty contexts, to systematically measure the individual and interacting influences of numerous factors on changes in GDP density. This investigation has found the ideal qualities of important variables that support GDP density growth. Furthermore, a better comprehension of the GDP density differentiation mechanism in rural poverty has been gained. Sufficient reasons for changes in GDP density in rural poverty have been established, based on variables like elevation, average yearly temperature, land use, normalized differential vegetation index (NDVI), and distance to main roadways. Crucially, it has been noted that these impact factors have interactive impacts on GDP density, with synergistic effects frequently producing nonlinear consequences and mutual enhancement.

== List of countries by GDP density ==
GDP forecast or estimate (million US$) by country
Country/Territory	IMF GDP 2025 (million)	Land area (km)	GDP per km2
United States	30,615,743	9,525,067	3,214,229
China (Note: Figures for China exclude Taiwan, and the special administrative regions of Hong Kong and Macau.)	19,398,577	9,596,960	2,021,325
Germany	5,013,574	357,581	14,020,806
Japan	4,279,828	377,915	11,324,843
India	4,125,213	3,287,263	1,254,908
United Kingdom	3,958,780	244,376	16,199,545
France	3,361,557	551,500 (metropolitan)	6,095,298
Italy	2,543,677	302,068	8,420,875
Russia	2,540,656	17,098,246	148,592
Canada	2,283,599	9,984,670	228,711
Brazil	2,256,910	8,510,346	265,196
Spain	1,891,371	505,370	3,742,547
Mexico	1,862,740	1,964,375	948,261
South Korea	1,858,572	100,432	18,505,775
Australia	1,829,508	7,741,220	236,333
Turkey	1,565,471	783,562	1,997,890
Indonesia	1,443,256	1,904,569	757,786
Netherlands	1,320,635	41,865	31,545,085
Saudi Arabia	1,268,535	2,149,690	590,101
Poland	1,039,619	312,685	3,324,813
Switzerland	1,002,666	41,291	24,282,919
Taiwan	884,387	35,980	24,579,961
Belgium	716,980	30,528	23,485,980
Ireland	708,771	70,273	10,085,965
Argentina	683,371	2,780,400	245,782
Sweden	662,318	450,295	1,470,854
Israel	610,752	21,937	27,841,182
Singapore	574,185	740	775,925,676
United Arab Emirates	569,097	83,600	6,807,380
Austria	566,456	83,878	6,753,332
Thailand	558,573	513,120	1,088,582
Norway	517,102	386,224	1,338,866
Philippines	494,158	300,000	1,647,193
Vietnam	484,726	331,340	1,462,926
Bangladesh	475,011	148,460	3,199,589
Malaysia	470,572	330,621	1,423,297
Denmark	459,612	42,947	10,701,842
Colombia	438,121	1,138,910	384,684
Hong Kong	428,233	1,114	384,410,233
South Africa	426,383	1,219,090	349,755
Romania	422,508	238,398	1,772,280
Pakistan	410,495	882,363	465,222
Czech Republic	383,384	78,871	4,860,899
Iran	356,513	1,648,195	216,305
Egypt	349,264	1,001,450	348,758
Chile	347,174	756,102	459,163
Portugal	337,936	92,225	3,664,256
Peru	318,480	1,285,216	247,803
Finland	314,724	338,145	930,737
Kazakhstan	300,052	2,724,910	110,114
Algeria	288,013	2,381,741	120,925
Nigeria	285,003	923,768	308,522
Greece	282,019	131,957	2,137,204
Iraq	265,455	438,317	605,623
New Zealand	262,909	268,838	977,946
Hungary	247,759	93,025	2,663,359
Qatar	222,119	11,586	19,171,327
Ukraine	209,713	575,627	364,321
Cuba	201,986 (2023)	109,884	1,838,175
Morocco	179,612	446,550	402,221
Kuwait	157,469	17,818	8,837,636
Slovakia	154,587	50,310	7,625,265
Uzbekistan	137,480	447,400	307,287
Kenya	136,014	580,367	234,359
Ecuador	130,529	283,561	460,321
Dominican Republic	129,748	48,670	2,665,872
Bulgaria	127,924	110,879	1,153,726
Puerto Rico	126,546	9,100	13,906,154
Guatemala	120,850	108,889	1,109,846
Angola	115,167	1,246,700	92,377
Ghana	111,963	238,537	469,374
Ethiopia	109,492	1,104,300	99,151
Oman	105,190	309,500	339,871
Croatia	103,901	56,594	1,835,901
Costa Rica	102,637	51,180	2,005,412
Luxembourg	100,642	2,586	38,918,020
Serbia	100,048	88,499	1,130,499
Ivory Coast	99,207	322,462	307,655
Sri Lanka	98,964 (2024)	67,240	1,471,802
Lithuania	95,274	65,286	1,459,333
Panama	90,408	75,320	1,200,319
Tanzania	87,444	947,303	92,308
Belarus	85,739	207,600	413,001
Uruguay	84,986	176,215	482,286
Venezuela	82,767	912,050	90,748
DR Congo	82,262	2,344,858	35,082
Slovenia	79,221	20,273	3,907,710
Azerbaijan	76,390	86,600	882,102
Turkmenistan	72,119	488,100	147,755
Uganda	64,993	241,550	269,066
Cameroon	60,577	475,650	127,356
Myanmar	60,561	676,578	89,511
Tunisia	59,069	163,610	361,035
Bolivia	57,086	1,098,581	51,963
Jordan	56,157	89,318	628,731
Zimbabwe	53,310	390,757	136,427
Macau	52,379	33	1,587,242,424
Cambodia	48,802	181,035	269,572
Libya	47,941	1,759,540	27,246
Latvia	47,880	64,594	741,245
Paraguay	47,398	406,752	116,528
Bahrain	47,391	778	60,913,882
Estonia	46,763	45,339	1,031,408
Nepal	45,513	147,181	309,231
Cyprus	39,943	9,251	4,317,695
Honduras	39,445	112,492	350,647
Iceland	38,386	103,000	372,680
Georgia	37,403	69,700	536,628
Senegal	36,839	196,712	187,274
El Salvador	36,587	21,041	1,738,843
Sudan	35,897	1,861,484	19,284
Bosnia and Herzegovina	33,237	51,209	649,046
Papua New Guinea	32,714	462,840	70,681
Haiti	30,908	27,750	1,113,802
Albania	29,939	28,748	1,041,429
Zambia	29,369	752,612	39,023
Lebanon	28,280 (2024)	10,452	2,705,702
Armenia	27,859	29,743	936,657
Malta	27,745	315	88,079,365
Guinea	27,515	245,857	111,915
Burkina Faso	26,866	274,200	97,980
Trinidad and Tobago	26,002	5,127	5,071,582
Mali	25,591	1,240,192	20,635
Mongolia	25,105	1,564,116	16,051
Guyana	25,064	214,969	116,594
Mozambique	24,726	799,380	30,931
Benin	24,402	114,763	212,630
Jamaica	23,137	10,991	2,105,086
Niger	22,969	1,267,000	18,129
Chad	21,592	1,284,000	16,816
Gabon	21,455	267,668	80,155
Nicaragua	20,689	130,373	158,691
Kyrgyzstan	20,160	199,949	100,826
Syria	19,993 (2024)	185,180	107,965
Moldova	19,620	33,847	579,667
Madagascar	19,377	587,041	33,008
Botswana	19,186	582,000	32,966
North Macedonia	18,783	25,713	730,487
Afghanistan	18,080 (2024)	652,864	27,693
Tajikistan	17,032	144,100	118,196
Laos	16,934	236,800	71,512
North Korea	16,447 (2023)	120,538	136,447
Bahamas	16,393	13,880	1,181,052
Mauritius	15,730	2,096	7,504,771
Congo	15,695	342,000	45,892
Brunei	15,565	5,765	2,699,913
Malawi	14,975	118,484	126,388
Rwanda	14,771	26,338	560,825
Namibia	14,686	824,292	17,817
Palestine	13,711 (2024)	6,020	2,277,575
Equatorial Guinea	13,467	28,051	480,090
Somalia	12,944	637,657	20,299
Kosovo	12,672	10,887	1,163,957
Mauritania	11,953	1,030,700	11,597
Togo	10,951	56,785	192,850
Monaco	9,995 (2024)	2	4,997,500,000
New Caledonia	9,623 (2024)	18,575	518,062
Liechtenstein	9,424	160	58,900,000
Montenegro	9,353	13,812	677,165
Bermuda	8,980 (2024)	54	166,296,296
Yemen	8,758 (2023)	455,503	19,227
Sierra Leone	8,639	72,300	119,488
Maldives	7,676	300	25,586,667
Barbados	7,559	431	17,538,283
Isle of Man	7,431 (2024)	572	12,991,259
Cayman Islands	7,139 (2024)	264	27,041,667
Burundi	7,025	27,834	252,389
Guam	6,910 (2024)	541	12,772,643
French Polynesia	6,402 (2024)	4,167	1,536,357
Fiji	6,336	18,272	346,760
Eswatini	5,201	17,363	299,545
Liberia	5,182	111,369	46,530
South Sudan	4,979	644,329	7,727
U.S. Virgin Islands	4,672 (2024)	347	13,463,977
Djibouti	4,613	23,200	198,836
Suriname	4,496	163,820	27,445
Andorra	4,408	468	9,418,803
Aruba	4,319	180	23,994,444
Faroe Islands	3,907 (2024)	1,393	2,804,738
Bhutan	3,408	38,394	88,764
Greenland	3,327 (2024)	2,166,086	1,536
Central African Republic	3,300	622,984	5,297
Belize	3,297	22,965	143,566
Curaçao	3,281 (2024)	444	7,389,640
Cape Verde	2,915	4,033	722,787
Saint Lucia	2,659	616	4,316,558
Gambia	2,497	11,295	221,071
Guinea-Bissau	2,474	36,125	68,484
Lesotho	2,390	30,355	78,735
Antigua and Barbuda	2,340	442	5,294,118
Eritrea	2,275 (2023)	117,600	19,345
San Marino	2,241	61	36,737,705
Seychelles	2,230	457	4,879,650
Timor-Leste	2,125	14,874	142,867
Solomon Islands	1,904	28,896	65,891
Turks and Caicos Islands	1,745 (2024)	948	1,840,717
Sint Maarten	1,735 (2024)	34	51,029,412
Comoros	1,613	1,861	866,738
British Virgin Islands	1,506 (2023)	151	9,973,510
Grenada	1,458	345	4,226,087
Samoa	1,248	2,842	439,127
Saint Vincent and the Grenadines	1,238	389	3,182,519
Saint Kitts and Nevis	1,141	261	4,371,648
Vanuatu	1,119	12,189	91,804
Northern Mariana Islands	1,096 (2024)	457	2,398,249
São Tomé and Príncipe	976	964	1,012,448
American Samoa	871 (2024)	199	4,376,884
Dominica	748	750	997,333
Saint Martin	649 (2024)	53	12,245,283
Tonga	587	747	785,810
Federated States of Micronesia	495	702	705,128
Anguilla	416 (2023)	91	4,571,429
Cook Islands	366 (2023)	236	1,550,847
Palau	341	459	742,919
Kiribati	321	811	395,808
Marshall Islands	302	181	1,668,508
Nauru	172	21	8,190,476
Montserrat	80 (2023)	103	776,699
Tuvalu	58	25	2,320,000
