= Lists of countries by GDP =

This is a list of lists of countries by GDP.

== General ==
- List of countries by GDP (nominal)
- List of countries by GDP (nominal) per capita
- List of countries by GDP (PPP)
- List of countries by GDP (PPP) per capita
- List of countries by GDP (PPP) per person employed
- List of countries by GDP sector composition
- List of countries by past and projected GDP (nominal)
- List of countries by past and projected GDP (nominal) per capita
- List of countries by past and projected GDP (PPP)
- List of countries by past and projected GDP (PPP) per capita
- List of countries by past GDP growth
- List of countries by largest historical GDP
- List of countries by real GDP growth rate
- List of countries by real GDP per capita growth
- List of countries by GNI (nominal) per capita
- List of countries by GNI (PPP) per capita
- List of countries by GNI per capita growth

== Specific regions ==
- List of Arab League countries by GDP (nominal), a list using the current exchange rates for national currencies
- List of Arab League countries by GDP (PPP), a list using purchasing power parity to derive GDP estimates
- List of Commonwealth of Nations countries by GDP (nominal), a list using the current exchange rates for national currencies
- List of Commonwealth of Nations countries by GDP (PPP), a list using purchasing power parity to derive GDP estimates
- List of first-level administrative divisions by GRDP
- List of first-level administrative country subdivisions by nominal GDP per capita
