= List of Commonwealth of Nations countries by GDP (PPP) =

This is a list of Commonwealth of Nations countries by gross domestic product (GDP) at purchasing power parity (PPP). Gross domestic product is the value of all final goods and services produced within a nation in a given year. The GDP dollar estimates presented here are calculated at market or government official exchange rates. Values are given in millions of international dollars. Dependent territories are shown in italics and are not ranked, and their flags are shown alongside the country of which they are a territory.

The table below shows the latest PPP and PPP per capita data for Commonwealth countries and territories of the member countries. Most figures (including for the world) are 2019 estimates from the International Monetary Fund. Other figures are estimates from The World Factbook of the Central Intelligence Agency (for GDP and GDP per capita), and are noted beside the figures along with the year of estimate.

Click on one of the small triangles in the headings to re-order the list according to that category.

Note: The figures for the dependent territories are slightly outdated (e.g. the GDP per capita figure for the Cayman Islands is from 2004), therefore they may not be easily compared with more recent figures for sovereign states.

Pie chart showing member countries by share of GDP (PPP) within the Commonwealth in 2018. Territories of member countries are not included.

Rank	Country/Territory	GDP (millions of Int$)	GDP per capita (Int$)
–	World	219,220,067	18,391
1	India	19,143,371	12,964
2	United Kingdom	4,592,101	65,215
3	Canada	2,814,459	67,714
4	Australia	2,060,651	73,361
5	Nigeria	2,391,986	9,861
6	Pakistan	1,762,305	7,176
7	Malaysia	1,564,902	45,712
8	Bangladesh	1,902,856	10,847
9	South Africa	1,056,982	16,283
10	Singapore	988,800	161,546
11	Sri Lanka	342,604	14,994
12	Ghana	314,592	8,813
13	New Zealand	309,050	57,481
14	Tanzania	317,858	4,595
15	Kenya	430,321	7,929
16	Uganda	205,344	4,131
17	Cameroon	183,323	5,960
18	Zambia	105,854	4,750
19	Trinidad and Tobago	53,069	36,814
20	Botswana	54,823	19,536
21	Mozambique	65,410	1,776
22	Cyprus	64,385	68,029
23	Brunei	45,283	97,445
24	Papua New Guinea	50,746	3,882
25	Mauritius	43,676	34,830
26	Rwanda	63,538	4,391
27	Jamaica	39,624	14,378
28	Namibia	39,781	9,835
29	Malawi	44,223	1,083
30	Malta	46,873	41,386
31	Sierra Leone	34,834	1,476
32	(The Bahamas) Bahamas	18,014	29,101
33	Eswatini	16,717	9,744
34	Fiji	15,944	10,605
35	Lesotho	7,592	3,156
36	Guyana	94,169	7,939
–	(United Kingdom) Isle of Man (Note: The Isle of Man is a Crown Dependency of the United Kingdom.)	6,792 (Note: 2015 estimate from the CIA World Factbook)	84,600 (Note: 2014 estimate from the CIA World Factbook)
37	(The Gambia) Gambia	6,448	2,397
–	(United Kingdom) Bermuda (Note: Bermuda is an overseas territory of the United Kingdom.)	6,127 (Note: 2016 estimate from the CIA World Factbook)	99,400
–	(United Kingdom) Jersey (Note: The Bailiwick of Jersey is a Crown Dependency of the United Kingdom.)	5,569	56,600
38	Barbados	5,434	16,519
39	Belize	3,520	7,564
–	(United Kingdom) Guernsey (Note: The Bailiwick of Guernsey is a Crown Dependency of the United Kingdom.)	3,465	52,500
40	Seychelles	3,056	27,669
41	Antigua and Barbuda	2,735	25,620
42	Saint Lucia	2,606	12,652
–	(United Kingdom) Cayman Islands (Note: The Cayman Islands are an overseas territory of the United Kingdom.)	2,507	43,800 (Note: 2004 estimate from the CIA World Factbook)
–	(United Kingdom) Gibraltar (Note: Gibraltar is an overseas territory of the United Kingdom.)	2,044	61,700
43	Grenada	1,819	14,595
44	Saint Kitts and Nevis	1,729	26,695
45	Solomon Islands	1,476	2,010
46	Saint Vincent and the Grenadines	1,375	10,873
47	Samoa	1,237	5,371
48	Vanuatu	862	2,581
49	Dominica	849	10,483
50	Tonga	650	5,662
–	(United Kingdom) Turks and Caicos Islands (Note: The Turks and Caicos Islands are an overseas territory of the United Kingdom.)	632 (Note: 2007 estimate from the CIA World Factbook)	29,100
–	(United Kingdom) British Virgin Islands (Note: The British Virgin Islands are an overseas territory of the United Kingdom.)	500 (Note: 2017 estimate from the CIA World Factbook)	34,200
–	(New Zealand) Cook Islands (Note: The Cook Islands are in free association with New Zealand.)	299.9	16,700
51	Kiribati	250	1,866
–	(United Kingdom) Falkland Islands (Note: The Falkland Islands are an overseas territory of the United Kingdom.)	206.4	70,800
–	(United Kingdom) Anguilla (Note: Anguilla is an overseas territory of the United Kingdom.)	175.4 (Note: 2009 estimate from the CIA World Factbook)	12,200 (Note: 2008 estimate from the CIA World Factbook)
–	(United Kingdom) Montserrat (Note: Montserrat is an overseas territory of the United Kingdom.)	167.4 (Note: 2011 estimate from the CIA World Factbook)	34,000
52	Nauru	117	7,856
53	Tuvalu	47	3,734
–	(United Kingdom) (Ascension Island) Saint Helena, Ascension and Tristan da Cunha (Note: Saint Helena, Ascension and Tristan da Cunha is an overseas territory of the United Kingdom.)	31.1 (Note: Financial year of 2009/10 estimate from the CIA World Factbook)	7,800

== See also ==
- List of countries by leading trade partners
- List of national and international statistical services
