= List of Commonwealth of Nations countries by GDP (nominal) =

This is a list of Commonwealth of Nations countries by GDP in nominal values. Gross domestic product is the value of all final goods and services produced within a nation in a given year. The GDP dollar estimates presented here are calculated at market or government official exchange rates. Values are given in millions of US dollars. Dependent territories are shown in italics and are not ranked, and their flags are shown alongside the country of which they are a territory.

The following lists show the latest figures for GDP and GDP per capita. Most figures are 2024 data from the International Monetary Fund; figures for dependent territories (both GDP and GDP per capita) are 2024 data from the United Nations. Figures from other sources and years are noted as such.

Click on one of the small triangles in the headings to re-order the list according to that category.

Rank	Country/Region	GDP (millions of US$)	GDP per capita (US$)
	World	128,003,776	14,217
	Commonwealth of Nations	17,321,323	6,265
1	United Kingdom	4,268,446	61,108
2	India	4,060,207	2,749
3	Canada	2,490,256	60,105
4	Australia	2,110,657	75,172
5	Singapore	667,889	109,117
6	Malaysia	547,100	15,981
7	Bangladesh	506,357	2,887
8	South Africa	489,083	7,659
9	Pakistan	450,134	1,836
10	Nigeria	386,671	1,594
11	New Zealand	273,395	51,043
12	Kenya	151,151	2,785
13	Ghana	128,638	3,604
14	Sri Lanka	110,680	5,062
15	Tanzania	94,889	1,325
16	Uganda	73,370	1,453
17	Cameroon	65,135	2,115
18	Cyprus	45,171	44,477
19	Zambia	41,243	1,883
20	Papua New Guinea	34,403	3,419
21	Guyana	33,961	38,572
22	Malta	30,712	52,149
23	Trinidad and Tobago	26,836	18,603
24	Gabon	23,363	11,034
25	Mozambique	23,275	673
26	Jamaica	23,028	8,674
27	Botswana	21,937	8,563
28	Rwanda	18,673	1,291
29	Malawi	18,309	740
30	Namibia	17,314	5,742
31	Mauritius	17,119	13,671
32	(The Bahamas) Bahamas	17,042	43,858
33	Brunei	16,863	40,613
34	Togo	13,437	1,480
—	(United Kingdom) Bermuda (Note: Bermuda is an overseas territory of the United Kingdom. Figures taken from UN (2024))	8,840	136,766
34	Fiji	6,352	7,034
35	Sierra Leone	8,270	947
36	Eswatini	5,792	4,775
—	(United Kingdom) Cayman Islands (Note: The Cayman Islands are an overseas territory of the United Kingdom. Figures taken from UN (2024))	7,657	102,833
38	Lesotho	2,972	1,298
39	Belize	3,450	8,078
40	Saint Lucia	2,765	15,091
41	Antigua and Barbuda	2,385	22,504
42	Seychelles	2,251	19,157
43	Solomon Islands	1,836	2,295
44	Grenada	1,483	13,208
45	(The Gambia) Gambia	2,792	1,030
46	Saint Kitts and Nevis	1,143	22,237
—	(United Kingdom) British Virgin Islands (Note: The Virgin Islands are an overseas territory of the United Kingdom. Figures taken from UN (2024))	1,830	38,627
47	Samoa	1,376	6,303
48	Vanuatu	1,396	4,052
49	Saint Vincent and the Grenadines	1,236	11,405
—	(United Kingdom) Turks and Caicos Islands (Note: The Turks and Caicos Islands are an overseas territory of the United Kingdom. Figure taken from UN (2024))	1,757	37,760
50	Dominica	791	10,428
51	Tonga	716	7,343
—	(United Kingdom) Anguilla (Note: Anguilla is an overseas territory of the United Kingdom. Figure taken from UN (2024))	456	31,269
—	(New Zealand) Cook Islands (Note: The Cook Islands are in free association with New Zealand. Figure taken from UN (2024))	414	30,161
52	Kiribati	401	3,058
53	Nauru	196	16,076
—	(United Kingdom) Montserrat (Note: Montserrat is an overseas territory of the United Kingdom. Figure taken from UN (2024))	81	18,451
54	Tuvalu	65	8,367

== See also ==
- Commonwealth free trade
- Commonwealth banknote-issuing institutions
- Organisation of African, Caribbean and Pacific States
- Lomé Convention / Cotonou Agreement
- List of countries by leading trade partners
- List of stock exchanges in the Commonwealth of Nations
- List of stock exchanges in the United Kingdom, the British Crown Dependencies and United Kingdom Overseas Territories
- List of national and international statistical services
