= Aquaculture in Kiribati =

Aquaculture in Kiribati is promoted by the country's Ministry of Natural Resource Development. Black pearls have been cultivated by way of longlines holding up to 5000 oysters each. Seaweed and milkfish cultivation also play key roles in Kiribati's economy.
