= List of countries by GDP (nominal) =

Largest economies in the world by nominal GDP in 2026
according to International Monetary Fund projections (Note: Figures for China exclude Taiwan, and the special administrative regions of Hong Kong and Macau.)

Countries by nominal GDP projected for 2026: (Note: Based on the first available nominal-GDP figure for each country or territory, using sources in this order: International Monetary Fund, World Bank, then United Nations Statistics Division. Within each source, the most recent observation containing a value is selected; IMF projections are included through its reported projection year. Source years may therefore differ. Entities with no figure from any of the three sources receive no GDP color.): > $20 trillion $10–20 trillion $5–10 trillion $1–5 trillion $750 billion – $1 trillion $500–750 billion / $250–500 billion $100–250 billion $50–100 billion $25–50 billion $5–25 billion < $5 billion

Gross domestic product (GDP) is the market value of all final goods and services from a nation in a given year. Countries are sorted by nominal GDP estimates from financial and statistical institutions, which are calculated at market or government official exchange rates. Nominal GDP does not take into account differences in the cost of living in different countries, and the results can vary greatly from one year to another based on fluctuations in the exchange rates of the country's currency. Such fluctuations may change a country's ranking from one year to the next, even though they often make little or no difference in the standard of living of its population.

Comparisons of national wealth are also frequently made based on purchasing power parity (PPP), to adjust for differences in the cost of living in different countries. Other metrics, nominal GDP per capita and a corresponding GDP (PPP) per capita, are used for comparing national standard of living. On the whole, PPP per capita figures are less spread than nominal GDP per capita figures.

The rankings of national economies have changed significantly over time. For instance, the United States overtook the British Empire around 1916; Japan rose rapidly in the post-World War II period to become the world’s second-largest economy by the 1970s; China moved from ninth place in 1978 to second in 2010 following market reforms. These shifts reflect long-term changes in global economic output.

The first list includes estimates compiled by the International Monetary Fund's World Economic Outlook, the second list shows the World Bank's data, and the third list includes data compiled by the United Nations Statistics Division. The IMF's definitive data for the past year and estimates for the current year are published twice a year in April and October. Non-sovereign entities (the world, continents, and some dependent territories) and states with limited international recognition (such as Kosovo and Taiwan) are included in the list where they appear in the sources.

== Table ==
The table initially ranks each IMF member including sovereign states not part of the IMF, non-sovereign nations and territories, and countries with limited recognition

GDP forecast or estimate (million US$) by country
Country/Territory	IMF (2026)	World Bank (2025)	United Nations (2024)
World	128,003,776	118,350,166	111,565,144
United States	32,642,373	30,769,700	29,298,000
China	21,546,403	19,498,039	18,743,802
Germany	5,471,299	5,050,923	4,659,929
Japan	4,341,986	4,435,163	4,026,211
United Kingdom	4,268,446	4,002,588	3,685,881
India	4,060,207	3,956,067	3,952,244
France	3,554,155	3,366,316	3,160,443
Russia	2,861,156	2,561,310	2,173,386
Italy	2,701,737	2,551,557	2,380,825
Brazil	2,654,761	2,279,920	2,185,822
Canada	2,490,256	2,319,900	2,270,076
South Korea	2,245,847	1,872,375	1,875,388
Mexico	2,176,236	1,832,641	1,852,723
Australia	2,110,657	1,798,519	1,830,610
Spain	2,085,276	1,906,453	1,722,746
Turkey	1,817,987	1,597,293	1,323,255
Indonesia	1,479,954	1,445,643	1,396,300
Netherlands	1,423,856	1,332,768	1,214,928
Saudi Arabia	1,343,346	1,276,943	1,254,141
Switzerland	1,135,739	1,043,530	936,564
Poland	1,133,088	1,035,492	914,696
Taiwan (Note: The name used in the IMF report is "Taiwan Province of China".)	1,019,696	—N/a	—N/a
Belgium	772,699	725,466	664,564
Argentina	768,206	683,098	638,365
Israel	746,982	610,778	542,286
Sweden	745,081	668,999	604,899
Ireland	709,972	721,701	577,389
Singapore	667,889	603,870	547,387
United Arab Emirates	661,018	552,325 (2024)	552,325
Norway	651,712	530,756	483,593
Austria	616,896	579,470	534,791
Thailand	599,115	577,010	526,518
Colombia	572,735	457,410	418,542
Malaysia	547,100	472,193	421,972
Vietnam	542,130	514,697	476,388
Bangladesh	506,357	456,319	432,742
Philippines	501,692	487,086	461,618
Denmark	499,354	462,527	424,525
South Africa	489,083	427,184	401,145
Romania	470,091	428,678	382,770
Hong Kong (Note: The name used in the IMF report is "Hong Kong SAR".)	455,156	427,310	406,863
Pakistan	450,134	407,307	379,120
Egypt	442,886	365,255	306,907
Czech Republic	427,953	391,027	345,037
Chile	402,243	357,371	330,267
Peru	399,593	334,855	289,329
Kazakhstan	397,921	306,239	291,480
Nigeria	386,671	290,794	252,084
Portugal	375,197	346,640	313,271
Finland	338,564	317,039	298,697
Algeria	331,894	287,031	266,972
Iran	311,950	362,682	448,092
Greece	304,627	280,636	257,145
New Zealand	273,395	264,057	260,172
Hungary	265,911	246,490	222,905
Cuba	—N/a	107,352 (2020)	252,063
Iraq	245,234	254,367	279,641
Ukraine (Note: Figures exclude the Autonomous Republic of Crimea and Sevastopol.)	229,406	214,233	190,741
Qatar	203,044	215,560	219,163
Morocco	195,632	182,374	160,606
Uzbekistan	178,167	147,038	114,965
Slovakia	167,062	154,530	141,776
Angola	157,297	122,175	117,159
Kenya	151,151	135,941	120,340
Kuwait	146,911	157,209	160,227
Bulgaria	146,507	130,777	113,343
Dominican Republic	146,362	127,407	124,282
Ecuador	138,199	130,321	124,676
Puerto Rico	133,222	129,368	125,842
Guatemala	132,270	123,306	113,200
Ghana	128,638	114,210	82,938
Ethiopia	127,145	126,359	142,275
DR Congo	122,281	91,031	75,322
Oman	121,397	109,605	107,137
Croatia	115,915	105,060	92,662
Ivory Coast	112,115	99,774	85,894
Serbia	112,025	99,953	89,074
Venezuela	111,303	99,661	150,494
Luxembourg	110,417	101,158	93,280
Costa Rica	109,931	102,905	95,350
Sri Lanka	98,964 (2024)	108,825	98,714
Lithuania	105,907	95,210	84,869
Belarus	102,042	93,397	75,962
Uruguay	96,092	85,348	80,962
Panama	95,024	90,463	86,260
Tanzania (Note: The UN figure excludes the autonomous region of Zanzibar.)	94,889	90,143	79,236
Slovenia	86,732	79,648	72,485
Myanmar	83,832	81,666	64,796
Turkmenistan	83,065	49,829	68,655
Bolivia	80,743	64,769	46,627
Azerbaijan	78,372	75,938	74,316
Uganda	73,370	61,986	56,369
Cameroon	65,135	58,933	53,297
Jordan	64,909	61,610	53,352
Tunisia	60,745	57,503	53,493
Paraguay	60,542	49,278	44,739
Zimbabwe	56,713	51,216	45,719
Macau (Note: The name used in the IMF report is "Macao SAR".)	54,228	52,061	49,467
Latvia	53,686	48,619	43,684
Libya	52,453	48,099	48,484
Cambodia	52,379	51,267	45,913
Estonia	51,634	47,031	42,765
Bahrain	48,849	48,966	47,110
Nepal	45,844	45,490	42,692
Cyprus (Note: Data are for the area controlled by the Government of the Republic of Cyprus.)	45,171	41,226	37,635
Sudan	44,688	60,163	25,574
Iceland	43,800	38,583	33,222
Georgia (Note: Excludes Abkhazia and South Ossetia)	42,716	38,144	34,192
Honduras	41,505	39,601	37,094
Zambia	41,243	28,880	25,303
Senegal	40,469	37,007	36,715
El Salvador	39,838	36,708	35,365
Haiti	39,180	32,077	25,312
Bosnia and Herzegovina	36,771	32,600	30,478
Lebanon	34,497 (2025)	25,972 (2024)	37,990
Papua New Guinea	34,403	32,499	32,262
Guyana	33,961	27,097	24,659
Mali	33,847	30,069	26,588
Albania	33,333	30,540	27,037
Burkina Faso	32,513	27,627	23,250
Armenia	31,873	29,243	25,955
Malta	30,712	27,772	25,030
Guinea	29,930	28,346	36,465
Mongolia	28,450	25,369	23,586
Benin	27,786	24,566	21,483
Trinidad and Tobago	26,836	25,943	25,634
Chad	25,628	21,473	19,906
Niger	24,813	21,646	17,491
Nicaragua	24,227	22,237	19,694
Kyrgyzstan	23,606	22,624	17,478
Gabon	23,363	21,427	20,867
Mozambique	23,275	22,338	22,745
Jamaica	23,028	22,705	22,014
Botswana	21,937	19,928	19,401
Moldova (Note: Excludes data for Transnistria)	21,889	20,352	18,200
North Macedonia	21,605	19,101	16,952
Madagascar	21,185	19,620	17,421
Tajikistan	20,418	17,661	13,949
Afghanistan	19,662 (2025)	17,779 (2024)	18,283
Laos	18,959	18,303	16,129
Rwanda	18,673	16,372	15,111
Malawi	18,309	14,918	11,734
Namibia	17,314	15,080	13,372
Syria	60,043 (2010)	23,738 (2022)	17,254
North Korea	—N/a	—N/a	17,199
Palestine (Note: The name used in the IMF and World Bank reports is "West Bank and Gaza".) (Note: The name used by the UN is "State of Palestine".)	16,017 (2024)	17,167	16,017
Mauritius	17,119	16,158	14,953
Bahamas	17,042	15,833 (2024)	15,833
Congo	17,028	16,307	16,412
Brunei	16,863	15,032	15,463
Mauritania	14,352	11,680	10,912
Somalia	14,174	12,995	11,966
Kosovo	14,053	12,456	11,154
Equatorial Guinea	13,722	12,823	12,288
Togo	13,437	11,890	10,163
Channel Islands	—N/a	12,507 (2023)	—N/a
Monaco	—N/a	11,126 (2024)	11,126
Montenegro	10,227	9,233	8,274
Liechtenstein	9,442	8,906 (2024)	8,628
Bermuda	—N/a	9,194 (2024)	8,840
New Caledonia	—N/a	8,549 (2024)	8,549
Barbados	8,483	8,017	7,598
Sierra Leone	8,270	7,464	6,792
Burundi	8,137	3,365	4,431
Maldives	8,130	7,741	7,062
Cayman Islands	—N/a	7,765 (2024)	7,657
Isle of Man	—N/a	7,576 (2023)	—N/a
Yemen	7,435	21,606 (2018)	14,304
Guam	—N/a	6,910 (2022)	—N/a
Fiji	6,352	6,198	5,968
French Polynesia	—N/a	6,324 (2024)	6,323
South Sudan	6,069	11,998 (2015)	3,522
Suriname	5,908	4,524	4,435
Eswatini	5,792	5,161	4,947
Liberia	5,642	5,246	5,251
Andorra	4,879	4,501	4,040
Djibouti	4,725	4,625	4,152
U.S. Virgin Islands	—N/a	4,672 (2022)	—N/a
Aruba	4,671	4,168 (2024)	4,192
Faroe Islands	—N/a	4,053 (2024)	—N/a
Bhutan	3,856	3,579	3,347
Curaçao	—N/a	3,561 (2024)	3,561
Central African Republic	3,492	3,066	2,752
Greenland	—N/a	3,327 (2023)	3,466
Belize	3,450	3,327	3,204
Cape Verde	3,448	3,057	2,768
Guinea-Bissau	2,985	2,528	2,008
Lesotho	2,972	2,574	2,391
Gambia	2,792	2,594	2,372
Saint Lucia	2,765	2,656	2,574
Zanzibar	—N/a	—N/a	2,530
San Marino	2,417	2,027 (2023)	2,082
Antigua and Barbuda	2,385	2,338	2,162
Seychelles	2,251	2,387	2,162
Timor-Leste	2,170	1,902	1,866
Eritrea	1,982 (2019)	2,065 (2011)	1,917
Sint Maarten	—N/a	1,888	1,670
Solomon Islands	1,836	1,750	1,584
British Virgin Islands	—N/a	—N/a	1,830
Comoros	1,814	1,815	1,567
Turks and Caicos Islands	—N/a	1,745 (2024)	1,757
Grenada	1,483	1,420	1,372
Vanuatu	1,396	1,354	1,092
Samoa	1,376	1,288	1,253
Saint Vincent and the Grenadines	1,236	1,255	1,136
São Tomé and Príncipe	1,161	981	828
Saint Kitts and Nevis	1,143	1,184	1,122
Northern Mariana Islands	—N/a	1,096 (2022)	—N/a
American Samoa	—N/a	871 (2022)	—N/a
Dominica	791	724	689
Tonga	716	679	648
Saint Martin	—N/a	649 (2021)	—N/a
Federated States of Micronesia	521	502	471
Anguilla	—N/a	—N/a	456
Cook Islands	—N/a	—N/a	414
Kiribati	401	349	343
Palau	377	345	310
Marshall Islands	342	308	281
Nauru	196	176	187
Montserrat	—N/a	—N/a	81
Tuvalu	65	57	56

== Nominal GDP of regional groupings ==
In addition to the national GDP values stated in the previous section, the IMF and World Bank statistics include GDP estimates for various regional grouping and trade blocks. The table below provides a list of these groupings, including the 13 IMF regions and, where available, the equivalent value from World Bank sources.

GDP forecast or estimate (million US$) by region or grouping
Regional groupings	IMF (2026)	World Bank (2024)
World	128,003,776	110,983,000
Advanced Economies/High Income (Note: The IMF category for Advanced Economies includes the following states: Andorra, Australia, Austria, Belgium, Canada, Croatia, Cyprus, Czech Republic, Denmark, Estonia, Finland, France, Germany, Greece, Hong Kong SAR, Iceland, Ireland, Israel, Italy, Japan, Korea, Latvia, Lithuania, Luxembourg, Macao SAR, Malta, The Netherlands, New Zealand, Norway, Portugal, Puerto Rico, San Marino, Singapore, Slovak Republic, Slovenia, Spain, Sweden, Switzerland, Taiwan Province of China, United Kingdom, United States)	74,234,689	71,321,000 (Note: The World Bank High Income category includes: American Samoa, Andorra, Antigua and Barbuda, Aruba, Australia, Austria, Bahamas, The, Bahrain, Barbados, Belgium, Bermuda, British Virgin Islands, Brunei Darussalam, Bulgaria, Canada, Cayman Islands, Channel Islands, Chile, Costa Rica, Croatia, Curacao, Cyprus, Czechia, Denmark, Estonia, Faroe Islands, Finland, France, French Polynesia, Germany, Gibraltar, Greece, Greenland, Guam, Guyana, Hong Kong SAR, China, Hungary, Iceland, Ireland, Isle of Man, Israel, Italy, Japan, Korea, Rep., Kuwait, Latvia, Liechtenstein, Lithuania, Luxembourg, Macao SAR, China, Malta, Monaco, Nauru, Netherlands, New Caledonia, New Zealand, Northern Mariana Islands, Norway, Oman, Palau, Panama, Poland, Portugal, Puerto Rico (US), Qatar, Romania, Russian Federation, San Marino, Saudi Arabia, Seychelles, Singapore, Sint Maarten (Dutch part), Slovak Republic, Slovenia, Spain, St. Kitts and Nevis, St. Martin (French part), Sweden, Switzerland, Trinidad and Tobago, Turks and Caicos Islands, United Arab Emirates, United Kingdom, United States, Uruguay, Virgin Islands (U.S.))
G7 (Note: The G7 group of countries includes: Canada, France, Germany, Italy, Japan, United Kingdom, United States)	55,470,253	-
Emerging Market and Developing Economies (Note: The IMF category for Emerging Markets and Developing Economies include the following states: Afghanistan, Albania, Algeria, Angola, Antigua and Barbuda, Argentina, Armenia, Aruba, Azerbaijan, The Bahamas, Bahrain, Bangladesh, Barbados, Belarus, Belize, Benin, Bhutan, Bolivia, Bosnia and Herzegovina, Botswana, Brazil, Brunei Darussalam, Bulgaria, Burkina Faso, Burundi, Cape Verde, Cambodia, Cameroon, Central African Republic, Chad, Chile, China, Colombia, Comoros, Democratic Republic of the Congo, Republic of Congo, Costa Rica, Côte d'Ivoire, Djibouti, Dominica, Dominican Republic, Ecuador, Egypt, El Salvador, Equatorial Guinea, Eritrea, Eswatini, Ethiopia, Fiji, Gabon, The Gambia, Georgia, Ghana, Grenada, Guatemala, Guinea, Guinea-Bissau, Guyana, Haiti, Honduras, Hungary, India, Indonesia, Iran, Iraq, Jamaica, Jordan, Kazakhstan, Kenya, Kiribati, Kosovo, Kuwait, Kyrgyzstan, Lao P.D.R., Lebanon, Lesotho, Liberia, Libya, Madagascar, Malawi, Malaysia, Maldives, Mali, Marshall Islands, Mauritania, Mauritius, Mexico, Micronesia, Moldova, Mongolia, Montenegro, Morocco, Mozambique, Myanmar, Namibia, Nauru, Nepal, Nicaragua, Niger, Nigeria, North Macedonia, Oman, Pakistan, Palau, Panama, Papua New Guinea, Paraguay, Peru, Philippines, Poland, Qatar, Romania, Russia, Rwanda, Samoa, São Tomé and Príncipe, Saudi Arabia, Senegal, Serbia, Seychelles, Sierra Leone, Solomon Islands, Somalia, South Africa, South Sudan, Sri Lanka, St. Kitts and Nevis, St. Lucia, St. Vincent and the Grenadines, Sudan, Suriname, Syria, Tajikistan, Tanzania, Thailand, Timor-Leste, Togo, Tonga, Trinidad and Tobago, Tunisia, Türkiye, Turkmenistan, Tuvalu, Uganda, Ukraine, United Arab Emirates, Uruguay, Uzbekistan, Vanuatu, Venezuela, Vietnam, Palestine, Yemen, Zambia, Zimbabwe)	53,769,087	-
Emerging and Developing Asia (Note: The IMF definition for Emerging and Developing Asia includes these states: Bangladesh, Bhutan, Brunei Darussalam, Cambodia, China, Fiji, India, Indonesia, Kiribati, Lao P.D.R., Malaysia, Maldives, Marshall Islands, Micronesia, Mongolia, Myanmar, Nauru, Nepal, Palau, Papua New Guinea, Philippines, Samoa, Solomon Islands, Sri Lanka, Thailand, Timor-Leste, Tonga, Tuvalu, Vanuatu, Vietnam)	30,209,314	22,261,000 (Note: The World Bank category of 'East Asia and Pacific (excluding high income)' includes: Cambodia, China, Fiji, Indonesia, Kiribati, Korea, Dem. People's Rep., Lao PDR, Malaysia, Marshall Islands, Micronesia, Fed. Sts., Mongolia, Myanmar, Papua New Guinea, Philippines, Samoa, Solomon Islands, Thailand, Timor-Leste, Tonga, Tuvalu, Vanuatu, Viet Nam)
European Union	22,806,152	19,497,000
Euro Area	19,256,912	16,485,000
Other Advanced Economies (Note: The IMF category for Other Advanced Economies includes these states: Andorra, Australia, Czech Republic, Denmark, Hong Kong SAR, Iceland, Israel, Korea, Macao SAR, New Zealand, Norway, Puerto Rico, San Marino, Singapore, Sweden, Switzerland, Taiwan Province of China)	11,226,953	-
Latin America & Caribbean	8,225,264	7,110,000
Emerging and Developing Europe (Note: The IMF category for Emerging and Developing Europe includes these states: Albania, Belarus, Bosnia and Herzegovina, Bulgaria, Hungary, Kosovo, Moldova, Montenegro, North Macedonia, Poland, Romania, Russia, Serbia, Türkiye, Ukraine)	7,134,720	-
Middle East and Central Asia (Note: The IMF category for Middle East and Central Asia includes these states: Afghanistan, Algeria, Armenia, Azerbaijan, Bahrain, Djibouti, Egypt, Georgia, Iran, Iraq, Jordan, Kazakhstan, Kuwait, Kyrgyzstan, Lebanon, Libya, Mauritania, Morocco, Oman, Pakistan, Qatar, Saudi Arabia, Somalia, Sudan, Syria, Tajikistan, Tunisia, Turkmenistan, United Arab Emirates, Uzbekistan, Palestine, Yemen)	5,685,529	-
ASEAN-5 (Note: The IMF category for ASEAN-5 includes these states: Indonesia, Malaysia, Philippines, Singapore, Thailand)	3,795,751	-
Sub-Saharan Africa	2,514,260	1,979,000

== See also ==
By country:

- List of countries by GDP (PPP)
- List of countries by GDP (nominal) per capita
- List of countries by GDP (PPP) per capita
- List of countries by real GDP growth rate
- List of countries by real GDP per capita growth
- List of countries by past and projected GDP (nominal)
- List of countries by past and projected GDP (PPP)

By region:

- List of African countries by GDP (nominal)
- List of Arab League countries by GDP (nominal)
- List of countries in Asia-Pacific by GDP (nominal)
- List of Commonwealth of Nations countries by GDP (nominal)
- List of Latin American and Caribbean countries by GDP (nominal)
- List of North American countries by GDP (nominal)
- List of Oceanian countries by GDP
- List of sovereign states in Europe by GDP (nominal)

Other entities:

- List of cities by GDP
- List of continents by GDP
- List of first-level administrative divisions by GRDP
- List of regions by past GDP (PPP)
- Trade bloc § Statistics
- Trillion dollar club (macroeconomics)
