= International dollar =

Hypothetical unit of currency

The international dollar (int'l dollar or intl dollar, symbols Int'l$., Intl$., Int$), also known as Geary–Khamis dollar (symbols G–K$ or GK$), is a hypothetical unit of currency that has the same purchasing power parity (PPP) that the U.S. dollar had in the United States at a given point in time. It is mainly used in economics and financial statistics for various purposes, most notably to determine and compare the purchasing power parity and gross domestic product (GDP) of various countries and markets. The year 1990 or 2000 is often used as a benchmark year for comparisons that run through time. The unit is often abbreviated, e.g., 2000 US dollars or 2000 International$ (if the benchmark year is 2000).

It is based on the twin concepts of PPP of currencies and the international average prices of commodities. It shows how much a local currency unit is worth within the country's borders. It is used to make comparisons both between countries and over time. For example, comparing the per capita GDP of various countries in international dollars, rather than based simply on exchange rates, provides a more valid measure to compare standards of living. It was proposed by Roy C. Geary in 1958 and developed by Salem Hanna Khamis between 1970 and 1982.

Figures expressed in international dollars cannot be converted to another country's currency using current market exchange rates; instead, they must be converted using the country's PPP exchange rate used in the study.

== Exchange rate by country ==
According to the IMF, below is the implied PPP exchange rate of the international dollar to the local currencies of the following nations:

Country	Exchange rate in 2025
Afghanistan	13.27
Albania	42.05
Algeria	42.58
Andorra	0.60
Angola	320.81
Antigua and Barbuda	1.85
Argentina	567.10
Armenia	148.16
Aruba	1.34
Australia	1.43
Austria	0.74
Azerbaijan	0.48
Bahamas	0.94
Bahrain	0.16
Bangladesh	30.91
Barbados	2.19
Belarus	0.92
Belgium	0.71
Belize	1.05
Benin	199.45
Bermuda	
Bhutan	20.33
Bolivia	2.71
Bosnia and Herzegovina	0.72
Botswana	4.99
Brazil	2.55
Brunei	0.48
Bulgaria	0.43
Burkina Faso	213.78
Burundi	1420.00
Cape Verde	47.12
Cambodia	1350.00
Cameroon	199.28
Canada	1.16
Central African Republic	233.90
Chad	206.06
Chile	473.23
China	3.40
Colombia	1550.00
Comoros	191.21
Congo	1150.00
Congo-Brazzaville	214.06
Costa Rica	298.38
Croatia	0.47
Cuba	
Cyprus	0.57
Czech Republic	12.96
Denmark	5.93
Djibouti	78.08
Dominica	1.37
Dominican Republic	23.86
Ecuador	0.43
Egypt	7.58
El Salvador	0.42
Equatorial Guinea	226.21
Eritrea	
Estonia	0.61
Ethiopia	30.34
Fiji	0.90
Finland	0.75
France	0.65
Gabon	217.84
Gambia	17.71
Georgia	0.91
Germany	0.72
Ghana	4.75
Greece	0.53
Grenada	1.53
Guatemala	3.28
Guinea	3120.00
Guinea-Bissau	230.49
Guyana	69.06
Haiti	111.31
Honduras	11.90
Hong Kong	5.52
Hungary	187.45
Iceland	157.56
India	20.08
Indonesia	4720.00
Iran	171610.00
Iraq	491.17
Ireland	0.76
Israel	3.68
Italy	0.60
Ivory Coast	213.82
Jamaica	94.73
Japan	94.69
Jordan	0.30
Kazakhstan	170.82
Kenya	43.55
Kiribati	1.12
Kosovo	0.34
Kuwait	0.18
Kyrgyzstan	28.46
Laos	4770.00
Latvia	0.53
Lesotho	6.31
Liberia	0.46
Libya	1.84
Lithuania	0.5
Luxembourg	0.86
Macao	4.45
Madagascar	1390.00
Malawi	616.94
Malaysia	1.36
Maldives	7.92
Mali	198.63
Malta	0.56
Marshall Islands	1.09
Mauritania	11.74
Mauritius	17.92
Mexico	10.29
Micronesia	1.09
Moldova	7.48
Mongolia	1210.00
Montenegro	0.38
Morocco	3.92
Mozambique	23.65
Myanmar	625.04
Namibia	7.10
Nauru	1.90
Nepal	33.33
Netherlands	0.77
New Zealand	1.50
Nicaragua	12.51
Niger	206.53
Nigeria	194.96
North Korea	
North Macedonia	19.32
Norway	8.80
Oman	0.18
Pakistan	67.54
Palau	1.02
Panama	0.45
Papua New Guinea	2.74
Paraguay	2650.00
Peru	1.83
Philippines	19.07
Poland	1.91
Portugal	0.57
Puerto Rico	0.77
Qatar	2.11
Romania	2.08
Russia	29.51
Rwanda	384.48
Saint Kitts and Nevis	1.69
Saint Lucia	1.35
Saint Vincent and the Grenadines	1.37
Samoa	2.01
San Marino	0.69
Sao Tome and Principe	13.77
Saudi Arabia	1.76
Senegal	206.67
Serbia	48.56
Seychelles	7.81
Sierra Leone	5340.00
Singapore	0.79
Slovakia	0.53
Slovenia	0.57
Solomon Islands	6.85
Somalia	0.40
South Africa	7.42
South Korea	787.88
South Sudan	1420.00
Spain	0.59
Sri Lanka	
Sudan	989.32
Suriname	12.12
Swaziland	5.91
Sweden	8.31
Switzerland	0.94
Syria	
Taiwan	13.65
Tajikistan	2.75
Tanzania	773.95
Thailand	10.09
Timor-Leste	0.29
Togo	198.30
Tonga	2.04
Trinidad and Tobago	3.39
Tunisia	0.92
Turkey	16.65
Turkmenistan	1.74
Tuvalu	1.47
Uganda	1260.00
Ukraine	12.86
United Arab Emirates	2.21
United Kingdom	0.67
United States	1.00
Uruguay	27.10
Uzbekistan	3670.00
Vanuatu	123.71
Venezuela	69.38
Vietnam	6990.00
Yemen	556.71
Zambia	7.56
Zimbabwe	10.31

== Short description of Geary–Khamis system ==
This system is valuing the matrix of quantities using the international prices vector. The vector is obtained by averaging the national prices in the participating countries after their conversion into a common currency with PPP and weighing quantities. PPPs are obtained by averaging the shares of national and international prices in the participating countries, weighted by expenditure. International prices and PPPs are defined by a system of interrelated linear equations that need to be solved simultaneously. The GK method produces PPPs that are transitive and actual final expenditures that are additive.

== Inflation adjusting ==
When comparing between countries and between years, the international dollar figures may be adjusted to compensate for inflation. In that case, the base year is chosen, and all figures will be expressed in constant international dollars for that specified base year. Researchers must understand which adjustments are reflected in the data (Marty Schmidt):

- Population adjustments (In which case, figures represent per capita monies);
- Currency exchange rate adjustments (In which case, figures will be expressed in one currency unit (typically US$, International $, € £ or ¥);
- Purchasing power parity adjustments and/or average commodity prices (in which case, figures are typically expressed as International $);
- Inflation adjustments (in which case, figures have been adjusted, based on changes in an inflation index such as the consumer price index, to represent currency for a "base" year, such as 2000).

== Description of Geary–Khamis system ==
It is an iterative method based on the solution of (m + n) linear equations; a country's currency is chosen as the reference monetary unit and set equal to 1, and all the values of the Purchasing Power Parities are initially set equal to 1, for example, and the system is solved, iterating until the PPP values converge. Suppose PPPj is the parity of the j-th currency with a currency called international dollars, which may reflect any currency; however, the US dollar is the most commonly used. Then the international price Pi is defined as an international average of the prices of the i-th commodity in various countries. Prices in these countries are expressed in their national currencies. The Geary–Khamis method solves this by using national prices after conversion into a common currency using the purchasing power parities (PPP). Hence, the international price, Pi of the i-th commodity, is defined as:

$$P_i=\frac{\left(p_{i1}q_{i1}/{\rm PPP}_1\right)+\left(p_{i2}q_{i2}/{\rm PPP}_2\right)+\cdots+\left(p_{iM}q_{iM}/{\rm PPP}_M\right)}{q_{i1}+q_{i2}+\cdots+q_{iM}}$$

This equation implies that the international price of the i-th commodity is calculated by dividing the total output of the i-th commodity in all selected countries, converted into international dollars, using purchasing power parities, by the total quantity produced of the i-th commodity. The previous equation can be rewritten as follows:

$$P_i=\sum_{j=1}^{M}{\left(p_{ij}/{\rm PPP}_j\right)\frac{q_{ij}}{\sum_{j=1}^{M}q_{ij}}}$$

This equation suggests that Pi is a weighted average of international prices pij after conversion into international dollars using PPPj. PPPj is by the Geary–Khamis system defined through this equation:

$${\rm PPP}_j=\frac{\sum_{i=1}^{N}{p_{ij}q_{ij}}}{\sum_{i=1}^{N}{P_iq_{ij}}}$$

The numerator of the equation represents the total value of output in the j-th country expressed in national currency, and the denominator is the value of the j-th country's output evaluated by repricing at international prices Pi in international dollars. Then PPPj gives the number of national currency units per international dollar.

== Advantages ==
Geary–Khamis international dollar is widely used by foreign investors and institutions such as the IMF, FAO and World Bank. It has become so widely used because it has made it possible to compare living standards between countries. Thanks to the international dollar, they can see a more trustworthy economic situation in the country and decide whether to provide additional loans (or any other investments) to said country, or not. It also offers some comparison of purchasing power parities all around the world (developing countries tend to have higher PPPs). Some traders even use the Geary–Khamis method to determine if a country's currency is undervalued or overvalued. Exchange rates are frequently used for comparing currencies; however, this approach does not reflect the real value of currency in said country. It is better to include PPP or the prices of goods in said country. International dollar solves this by taking into account exchange rates, PPP and average commodity prices. The Geary–Khamis method is the best method for comparisons of agricultural outputs.

== See also ==
- World currency
- World currency unit
- Special drawing rights
- Big Mac Index
- Bancor
- Purchasing power parity
