= List of countries by GDP (nominal) per capita =

Countries or territories by GDP (nominal) per capita in 2026: >$70,000 $60,000–70,000 $50,000–60,000 $40,000–50,000 $30,000–40,000 $20,000–30,000 / $10,000–20,000 $5,000–10,000 $2,500–5,000 $1,000–2,500 <$1,000 No data

Nominal gross domestic product (GDP) (Note: In this context, "nominal" means a GDP estimate which represents the value of the currency during the period it was measured; that is, one which has not been adjusted for inflation) per capita is the total value of a country's finished goods and services (gross domestic product) divided by its total population (per capita).

Gross domestic product per capita is often used as a proxy indicator of a country's standard of living; however, this is inaccurate because GDP per capita is not a measure of personal income and does not take into account social and environmental costs and benefits. Measures of personal income include average wage, real income, median income, disposable income and gross national income (GNI) per capita.

Comparisons of GDP per capita are also frequently made on the basis of purchasing power parity (PPP), to adjust for differences in the cost of living in different countries. PPP largely removes the exchange rate problem but not others; it does not reflect the value of economic output in international trade, and it also requires more estimation than GDP per capita. On the whole, PPP per capita figures are more narrowly spread than nominal GDP per capita figures.

GDP per capita does not consider differences in the cost of living in different countries, and the results may vary greatly from one year to another based on fluctuations in the exchange rates of the country's currency. Such fluctuations may change a country's ranking from one year to the next, while the standard of living of its population might not change by as much.

Several leading GDP-per-capita (nominal) jurisdictions may be considered tax havens, and their GDP data subject to material distortion by tax-planning activities. Examples include Bermuda, the Cayman Islands, Ireland and Luxembourg.

Non-sovereign entities (the world, continents, and some dependent territories) and states with limited international recognition are included in the list in cases in which they appear in the sources. These economies are not ranked in the charts (except Kosovo and Taiwan) but are listed in sequence by GDP for comparison. Three UN members (Cuba, Monaco and North Korea) do not belong to the International Monetary Fund (IMF), hence their economies are not ranked. Kosovo is not a member of the United Nations but is a member of the IMF. Taiwan is not an IMF member but is listed in the official IMF indices.

== Distorted GDP-per-capita for tax havens ==
Many of the leading GDP-per-capita (nominal) jurisdictions are tax havens whose economic data is artificially inflated by tax-driven corporate accounting entries. For instance, the Irish GDP data above is subject to material distortion by the tax planning activities of foreign multinationals in Ireland. To address this, in 2017 the Central Bank of Ireland created "modified GNI" (or GNI*) as a more appropriate statistic, and the OECD and IMF have adopted it for Ireland. 2015 Irish GDP is 143% of 2015 Irish GNI*.

A stunning $12 trillion—almost 40 percent of all foreign direct investment positions globally—is completely artificial: it consists of financial investment passing through empty corporate shells with no real activity. These investments in empty corporate shells almost always pass through well-known tax havens. The eight major pass-through economies—the Netherlands, Luxembourg, Hong Kong SAR, the British Virgin Islands, Bermuda, the Cayman Islands, Ireland, and Singapore—host more than 85 percent of the world’s investment in special purpose entities, which are often set up for tax reasons.

— "Piercing the Veil", International Monetary Fund, June 2018

== Table ==
[data missing]All data are in current United States dollars. For historical data, see list of countries by past and projected GDP (nominal) per capita.

The table initially ranks each country or territory by its IMF estimate, and can be reranked by any of the sources.

Nominal GDP (in USD) per capita by country, territory, non-sovereign state or non-IMF member
Country/Territory	IMF (2026) (Note: The following countries are from 2023–2024 data: Afghanistan, Lebanon, Palestine, and Sri Lanka.)	World Bank (2025)	United Nations (2023-24)
Monaco	—N/a	288,002 (2024)	288,002
Liechtenstein	230,417	220,167 (2024)	216,392
Luxembourg	155,733	147,252	138,596
Bermuda	—N/a	142,250 (2024)	136,766
Ireland	127,837	131,593	109,874
Switzerland	124,478	114,769	104,973
Norway	115,188	94,594	86,717
Singapore	109,117	98,814	93,853
Iceland	107,464	98,324	84,450
Cayman Islands	—N/a	104,293 (2024)	102,833
United States	95,212	90,027	84,817
Isle of Man	—N/a	90,015 (2023)	—N/a
Denmark	82,713	76,970	71,021
Netherlands	78,535	73,684	66,649
Macau	77,049	75,902	68,680
Australia	75,172	65,130	68,528
Channel Islands	—N/a	74,586 (2023)	—N/a
Faroe Islands	—N/a	74,175 (2024)	—N/a
Israel	72,441	60,337	57,770
San Marino	70,662	59,871 (2023)	58,917
Sweden	69,244	63,133	57,028
Austria	67,020	62,930	58,634
Germany	65,699	60,496	55,113
Belgium	64,773	60,750	56,613
Qatar	63,634	72,525	71,894
Greenland	—N/a	58,499 (2023)	62,078
United Kingdom	61,108	57,602	53,313
Hong Kong	60,322	56,983	54,871
Finland	60,156	56,149	53,174
Canada	60,105	55,698	57,120
United Arab Emirates	57,109	50,274 (2024)	50,088
Andorra	53,988	54,292	49,304
Malta	52,149	47,907	46,386
France	51,448	48,986	45,950
New Zealand	51,043	49,591	49,889
Italy	45,886	43,309	40,112
Cyprus (Note: Data are for the area controlled by the Government of the Republic of Cyprus.)	44,477	41,783	40,476
U.S. Virgin Islands	—N/a	44,321 (2022)	—N/a
Taiwan (Note: The name used by the IMF is the "Taiwan Province of China".)	43,951	—N/a	—N/a
Bahamas	43,858	39,455 (2024)	39,455
South Korea	43,512	36,227	36,262
Sint Maarten (Dutch part)	—N/a	42,978	38,515
Aruba	42,934	38,591 (2024)	38,791
Puerto Rico	41,851	40,620	38,814
Guam	—N/a	41,833 (2022)	—N/a
Spain	41,756	38,627	35,958
Slovenia	41,631	37,376	34,212
Brunei	40,613	32,235	33,418
Czech Republic	39,614	35,917	32,139
British Virgin Islands	—N/a	—N/a	38,627
Guyana	38,572	32,414	29,670
Turks and Caicos Islands	—N/a	37,507 (2024)	37,760
Estonia	37,310	34,418	31,434
Saudi Arabia	36,577	34,537	36,927
Lithuania	36,135	32,959	29,684
Japan	35,399	35,951	32,534
Portugal	34,815	32,082	30,049
Anguilla	—N/a	—N/a	31,269
Poland	31,186	28,420	23,734
Slovakia	30,884	28,544	25,746
Cook Islands	—N/a	—N/a	30,161
Croatia	29,860	27,104	23,911
Greece	29,413	26,948	25,592
New Caledonia	—N/a	29,213 (2024)	34,981
Kuwait	28,928	32,312	32,471
Latvia	28,630	26,312	23,337
Barbados	28,245	28,365	26,897
Bahrain	28,147	30,597	29,314
Hungary	27,884	25,908	23,037
Uruguay	27,339	25,216	23,907
Romania	24,742	22,538	20,130
Northern Mariana Islands	—N/a	23,786 (2022)	—N/a
Cuba	—N/a	9,605 (2020)	22,957
Curaçao	—N/a	22,833 (2024)	19,200
Antigua and Barbuda	22,504	24,819	23,060
French Polynesia	—N/a	22,440 (2024)	22,438
Oman	22,425	19,947	20,825
Bulgaria	22,300	20,328	16,773
Saint Kitts and Nevis	22,237	22,771	23,916
Saint Martin (French part)	—N/a	21,668 (2021)	—N/a
Palau	21,308	19,532	17,513
Costa Rica	21,282	19,970	18,587
Turkey	21,079	18,599	15,127
Panama	20,877	19,790	19,103
Chile	19,962	17,995	16,710
Russia	19,953	17,547	15,007
Maldives	19,507	14,615	13,379
Kazakhstan	19,311	14,692	14,155
Seychelles	19,157	19,449	16,576
Trinidad and Tobago	18,603	18,967	17,001
Montserrat	—N/a	—N/a	18,451
American Samoa	—N/a	18,018 (2022)	—N/a
Serbia	17,126	15,262	13,223
Montenegro	16,211	14,817	12,959
Mexico	16,191	13,889	14,158
Nauru	16,076	14,640	15,645
Argentina	16,021	14,898	13,970
Malaysia	15,981	13,125	11,867
China (Note: Figures for China exclude Taiwan, and the special administrative regions of Hong Kong and Macau.)	15,371	13,862	13,206
Saint Lucia	15,091	14,746	14,323
World	14,217	14,406	13,097
Albania	13,968	12,998	9,685
Mauritius	13,671	12,991	11,763
Grenada	13,298	12,107	11,705
Dominican Republic	13,245	11,059	10,876
Brazil	12,397	10,713	10,311
Turkmenistan	12,291	6,540	9,161
Belarus	11,962	10,279	8,387
North Macedonia	11,762	10,490	9,299
Peru	11,498	9,684	8,456
Saint Vincent and the Grenadines	11,405	12,562	11,294
Georgia (Note: Excludes Abkhazia and South Ossetia.)	11,234	9,692	8,980
Gabon	11,034	8,263	8,219
Bosnia and Herzegovina	10,845	10,382	9,632
Colombia	10,726	8,562	7,914
Armenia	10,663	9,474	8,728
Dominica	10,428	10,989	10,405
Paraguay	9,907	7,027	6,457
Moldova (Note: Excludes data for Transnistria.)	9,497	8,622	5,997
Marshall Islands	9,085	8,489	7,491
Suriname	8,965	7,070	6,990
Kosovo	8,902	7,899	6,621
Jamaica	8,674	8,003	7,754
Mongolia	8,570	7,108	6,786
Botswana	8,563	7,778	7,695
Azerbaijan	8,497	7,411	7,190
Equatorial Guinea	8,484	6,615	6,493
Thailand	8,372	8,057	7,347
Tuvalu	8,367	6,345 (2023)	5,851
Belize	8,078	7,866	7,681
South Africa	7,659	6,598	6,267
Ecuador	7,575	7,125	6,875
Libya	7,557	6,449	6,569
Tonga	7,343	6,547	6,218
Ukraine (Note: Figures exclude the Autonomous Republic of Crimea and Sevastopol.)	7,075	5,866	5,038
Fiji	7,034	6,642	6,426
Federated States of Micronesia	7,010	4,414	5,058
Guatemala	6,980	6,598	6,150
Algeria	6,910	6,051	5,703
Cape Verde	6,556	5,797	5,273
Lebanon	6,443 (2025)	4,473 (2024)	6,543
Samoa	6,303	5,873	5,749
El Salvador	6,124	5,767	5,580
Namibia	5,742	4,876	4,413
Jordan	5,598	5,348	4,618
Vietnam	5,260	5,066	4,717
Iraq	5,258	5,410	6,074
Indonesia	5,153	5,060	4,925
Morocco	5,141	4,673	4,217
Sri Lanka	5,062	5,002	4,273
Tunisia	5,053	4,657	4,357
Bhutan	4,933	4,493	4,228
Eswatini	4,775	4,108	3,981
São Tomé and Príncipe	4,582	4,084	3,517
Uzbekistan	4,575	3,968	3,162
Djibouti	4,556	3,906	3,553
Philippines	4,360	4,171	3,985
Venezuela	4,355	3,495	5,298
Vanuatu	4,052	4,039	3,332
Bolivia	4,051	5,148	3,756
Egypt	4,024	3,086	2,634
Angola	3,876	3,130	3,092
Nicaragua	3,732	3,173	2,848
Zimbabwe	3,718	3,021	2,748
Honduras	3,663	3,598	3,426
Kyrgyzstan	3,620	3,081	2,432
Ghana	3,604	3,257	2,409
Iran	3,548	3,924	4,894
Papua New Guinea	3,419	3,020	2,986
Ivory Coast	3,264	3,050	2,690
Palestine (Note: The name used by the IMF and World Bank is the "West Bank and Gaza". The name used by the UN is the "State of Palestine".)	2,853 (2024)	3,171	3,640
Haiti	3,095	2,694	1,705
Kiribati	3,058	2,559	2,178
Mauritania	3,015	2,198	2,121
Cambodia	3,001	2,872	2,603
Bangladesh	2,887	2,597	2,464
Congo	2,867	2,515	2,291
Guinea	2,785	1,877	1,597
Kenya	2,785	2,363	1,952
India	2,749	2,703	2,724
Laos	2,331	2,325	1,958
Solomon Islands	2,295	2,086	2,042
Cameroon	2,115	1,972	1,737
Senegal	2,054	1,955	1,682
Tajikistan	2,005	1,637	1,161
Pakistan	1,935	1,596	1,212
Zambia	1,882	1,318	1,331
Comoros	1,859	2,056	1,703
Benin	1,800	1,658	1,394
Nigeria	1,594	1,224	1,646
Nepal	1,540	1,536	1,363
Timor-Leste	1,520	1,341	1,503
Myanmar	1,507	1,489	1,147
Togo	1,480	1,384	997
Uganda	1,453	1,206	1,049
Guinea-Bissau	1,429	1,124	855
Zanzibar	—N/a	—N/a	1,374
Mali	1,343	1,193	833
Tanzania (Note: The UN figure excludes autonomous region of Zanzibar.)	1,325	1,319	1,209
Burkina Faso	1,316	1,148	883
Lesotho	1,298	1,089	916
Chad	1,295	1,022	913
Rwanda	1,291	1,124	1,010
Syria	—N/a	1,057 (2022)	1,230
Ethiopia	1,111	933	1,241
DR Congo	1,111	807	655
Gambia	1,030	919	890
Liberia	976	915	917
Sierra Leone	947	846	758
Central African Republic	891	556	496
Somalia	850	661	597
Niger	740	775	643
Malawi	740	672	509
Mozambique	673	627	623
Eritrea	—N/a	688 (2011)	656
Madagascar	649	599	598
South Sudan	642	1,080 (2015)	403
North Korea	—N/a	—N/a	640
Sudan	597	1,165	680
Yemen	567	634 (2018)	222
Burundi	510	234	289
Afghanistan	448 (2025)	417 (2024)	396
Notes: Data unavailable for the Falkland Islands, Gibraltar, Guernsey, the Holy See (Vatican City), Jersey, Niue, the Pitcairn Islands, Saint Helena, Ascension and Tristan da Cunha, Tokelau, and Western Sahara.; Nearly all country links in the table (except that of Zanzibar) take to articles titled "Income in country or territory" or to "Economy of country or territory".

== See also ==
- List of countries by external debt
- List of countries by GDP (nominal)
- List of countries by GDP (PPP) per capita
- List of countries by GNI (nominal) per capita
- List of countries by past and projected GDP (nominal) per capita
- List of countries by wealth per adult
