= Trillion dollar club (macroeconomics) =

GDP of more than US$1 trillion

The Trillion dollar club is an unofficial classification of the world's major economies with a gross domestic product (nominal GDP) of more than US$1 trillion per year. As of 2025, it included 21 countries. This does not include purchasing power parity, which increases the GDP of many countries with an undervalued currency, which are usually poorer countries.

Since currency valuations can be subject to rapid change, a country could achieve the US$1 trillion nominal GDP mark one year and then produce less than that in total goods and services the following year(s). The 2010 data used here are compiled according to the International Monetary Fund (IMF) values. As for the former Soviet Union, the last statistics about its economy stated that it had an over US$2.5 trillion economy in the 1990 fiscal year, before its collapse.

== US$1 trillion – US$10 trillion ==
=== US$1 trillion economy ===
Year	Country	Source
1969	United States	
1972	European Union	
1979	Japan	
1987	West Germany	
1988	France	
1989	United Kingdom	
1990	Italy	
1998	China	
2004	Spain	
2004	Canada	
2006	Brazil	
2006	South Korea	
2006	Russia	
2006	Mexico	
2007	India	
2008	Australia	
2017	Indonesia	
2021	Netherlands	
2022	Saudi Arabia	
2023	Turkey	
2025	Poland	
2025	Switzerland	

=== US$2 trillion economy ===
Year	Country	Source
1977	European Union	
1977	United States	
1986	Japan	
1992	Germany	
2003	United Kingdom	
2004	France	
2005	China	
2007	Italy	
2010	Brazil	
2011	Russia	
2014	India	
2021	Canada	
2026	Mexico	

=== US$3 trillion economy ===
Year	Country	Source
1980	European Union	
1981	United States	
1988	Japan	
2006	Germany	
2007	China	
2007	United Kingdom	
2021	India	
2023	France	

=== US$4 trillion economy ===
Year	Country	Source
1984	United States	
1986	European Union	
1993	Japan	
2008	China	
2018	Germany	
2026	India	

=== US$5 trillion economy ===
Year	Country	Source
1987	European Union	
1988	United States	
1995	Japan	
2009	China	
2025	Germany	

=== US$6 trillion economy ===
Year	Country	Source
1989	European Union	
1992	United States	
2010	China	
2011	Japan	

=== US$7 trillion economy ===
Year	Country	Source
1990	European Union	
1994	United States	
2011	China	

=== US$8 trillion economy ===
Year	Country	Source
1992	European Union	
1996	United States	
2012	China	

=== US$9 trillion economy ===
Year	Country	Source
1995	European Union	
1998	United States	
2013	China	

=== US$10 trillion economy ===
Year	Country	Source
2000	United States	
2004	European Union	
2014	China	

== US$11 trillion – US$20 trillion ==
=== US$11 trillion economy ===
Year	Country	Source
2003	United States	
2004	European Union	
2015	China	

=== US$12 trillion economy ===
Year	Country	Source
2004	European Union	
2004	United States	
2017	China	

=== US$13 trillion economy ===
Year	Country	Source
2004	European Union	
2005	United States	
2018	China	

=== US$14 trillion economy ===
Year	Country	Source
2005	European Union	
2007	United States	
2019	China	

=== US$15 trillion economy ===
Year	Country	Source
2006	European Union	
2011	United States	
2021	China	

=== US$16 trillion economy ===
Year	Country	Source
2007	European Union	
2012	United States	
2021	China	

=== US$17 trillion economy ===
Year	Country	Source
2007	European Union	
2014	United States	
2021	China	

=== US$18 trillion economy ===
Year	Country	Source
2008	European Union	
2015	United States	
2021	China	

=== US$19 trillion economy ===
Year	Country	Source
2008	European Union	
2018	United States	
2025	China	

=== US$20 trillion economy ===
Year	Country	Source
2018	United States	
2025	European Union	
2025	China	

== US$21 trillion – US$30 trillion ==
=== US$21 trillion economy ===
Year	Country	Source
2019	United States	
2025	European Union	
2026	China	

=== US$22 trillion economy ===
Year	Country	Source
2021	United States	

=== US$23 trillion economy ===
Year	Country	Source
2021	United States	

=== US$24 trillion economy ===
Year	Country	Source
2022	United States	

=== US$25 trillion economy ===
Year	Country	Source
2022	United States	

=== US$26 trillion economy ===
Year	Country	Source
2022	United States	

=== US$27 trillion economy ===
Year	Country	Source
2023	United States	

=== US$28 trillion economy ===
Year	Country	Source
2024	United States	

=== US$29 trillion economy ===
Year	Country	Source
2025	United States	

=== US$30 trillion economy ===
Year	Country	Source
2025	United States	

== See also ==
- List of countries by GDP (nominal)
- List of countries by GDP (PPP)
