= Lists of non-sovereign nations =

Lists of unrecognized nations

The following articles contain lists of non-sovereign nations:

== Current ==
- List of active autonomist and secessionist movements, representing those nations which are currently part of a transnational state but would like to secede from the state.
- List of unrecognized states, representing those states which have declared independence, but whose independence has not been recognised by the majority of the international community.
- List of current non-sovereign monarchs, representing monarchies which reign over a legally recognised dominion, but in most cases possess little or no sovereign power.

== Historical ==
- List of historical autonomist and secessionist movements, that may or may not have succeeded in their goal.
- List of historical unrecognized states and dependencies

== See also ==
- List of former sovereign states, which were independent and have been subsumed into transnational states like the United Kingdom
- Gallery of sovereign state flags § Other states, which have declared independence, but whose independence has not been recognised by the majority of the international community
