= Economy of Solomon Islands =

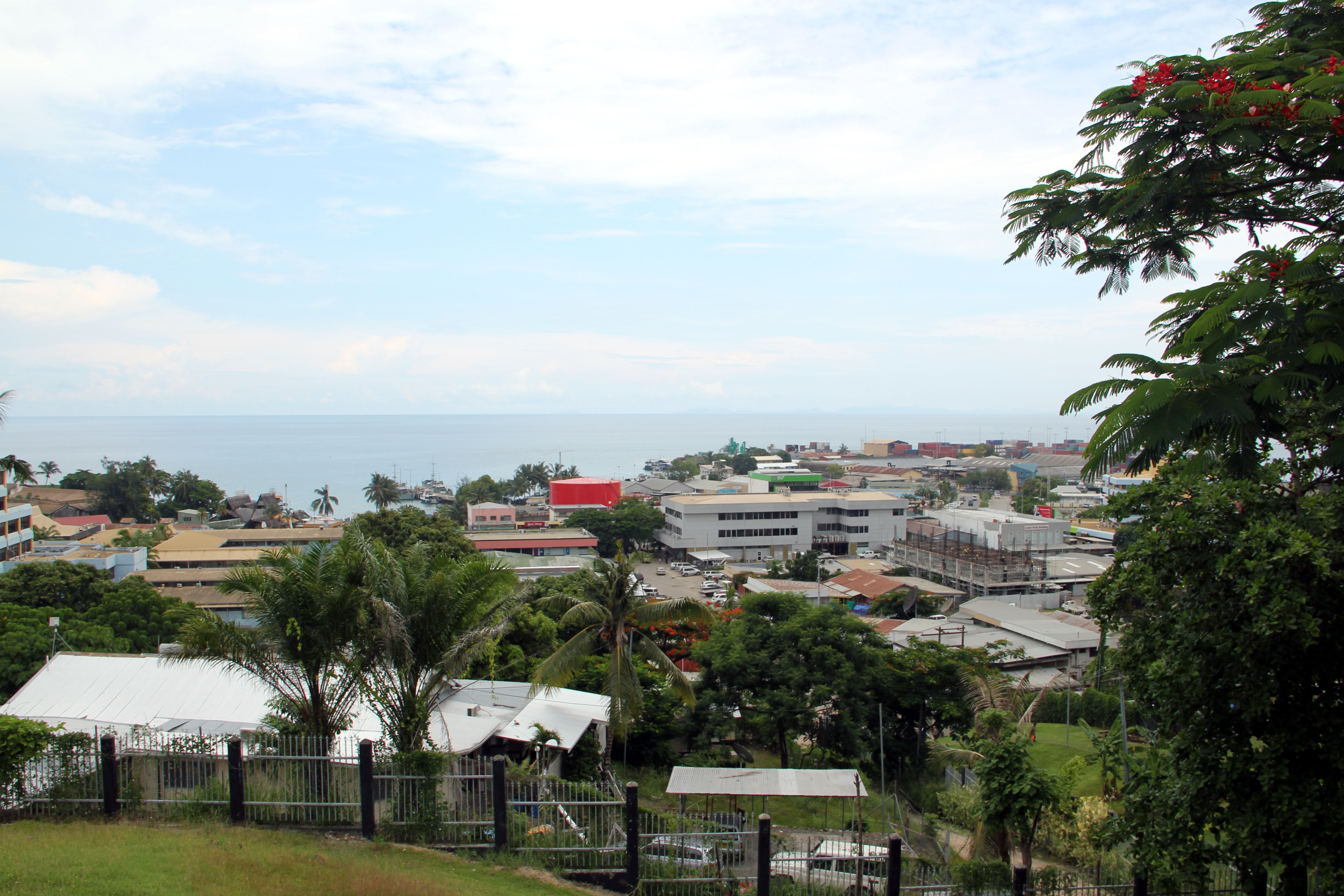
- downtown Honiara

Statistics
- GDP: ▲$1.9 billion (nominal; 2025); ▲$2.17 billion (PPP; 2025)
- GDP rank: 179th (nominal; 2025); 184th (PPP; 2025)
- GDP growth: ▲2.7% (2025); ▲2.8% (2026); ▲2.9% (2027f); ▲3.0% (2028f)
- GDP per capita: ▲$2,380 (nominal; 2025); ▲$2,710 (PPP; 2025)
- GDP per capita rank: 150th (nominal; 2025); 170th (PPP; 2025)
- Inflation (CPI): 2.664% (2018)
- Human Development Index: ▲0.564 medium (2022) (153rd); N/A IHDI (2018)
- All values, unless otherwise stated, are in US dollars.

A per capita GDP of $3,200 ranks Solomon Islands as a lesser developed nation. Over 75% of its labour force is engaged in subsistence farming and fishing.

== Economic history ==
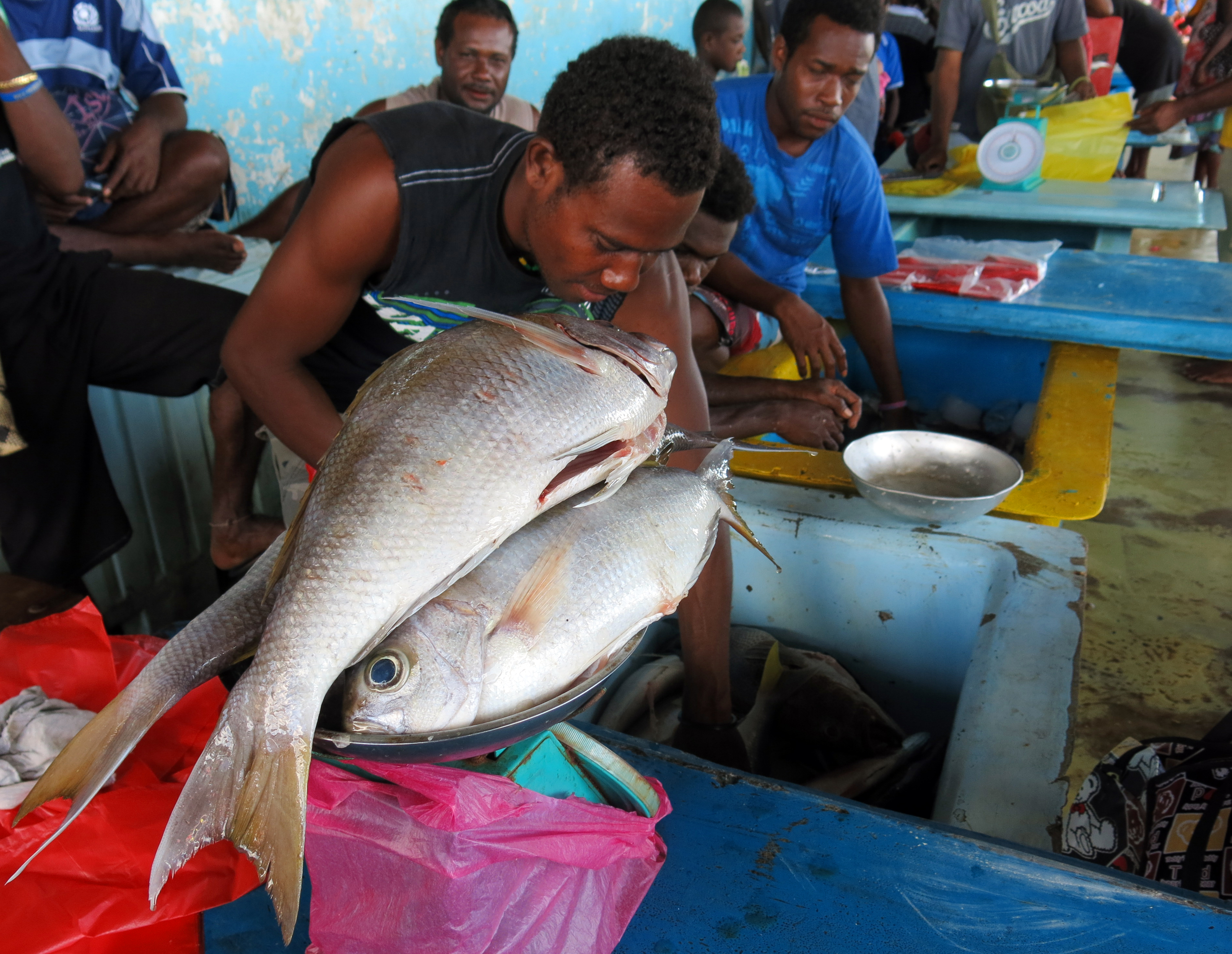
A man sells fish at the central market in Honiara, 2013

Until 1998, when world prices for tropical timber fell steeply, timber was Solomon Islands main export product. In recent years, Solomon Islands forests were dangerously overexploited.

Solomon Islands was particularly hard hit by the Asian financial crisis even before the ethnic violence of June 2000. The Asian Development Bank estimates that the crash of the market for tropical timber reduced Solomon Island's GDP by between 15%-25%. About one-half of all jobs in the timber industry were lost. The government has said it will reform timber harvesting policies with the aim of resuming logging on a more sustainable basis.

In the wake of the ethnic violence in June 2000, exports of palm oil and gold ceased while exports of timber fell.

== Economic sectors ==
=== Cash crops ===
Important cash crops and exports include copra and palm oil.

=== Gold ===
In 1998 gold production began at Gold Ridge on Guadalcanal.

=== Fishing ===
Exploitation of Solomon Islands' rich fisheries offers the best prospect for further export and domestic economic expansion. A Japanese joint venture, Solomon Taiyo Ltd., which operated the only fish cannery in the country, closed in mid-2000 as a result of the ethnic disturbances. Though the plant has reopened under local management, the export of tuna has resume now but under Soltuna and NFD.

=== Tourism ===
In 2017, Solomon Islands was one of the least frequently visited countries in the world, with only 26,000 tourists. Tourism income in 2016 and 2017 was about Int'l$ 1.6 million (international dollars). Tourism is a potentially significant service industry but growth is hampered by the lack of infrastructure, transportation limitations and security concerns. Scuba diving and World War II history are two major tourist attractions..

=== Healthcare ===
The Human Rights Measurement Initiative finds that the Solomon Islands is fulfilling 78.8% of what it should be fulfilling for the right to health based on its level of income. When looking at the right to health with respect to children, the Solomon Islands achieves 100.0% of what is expected based on its current income. In regards to the right to health amongst the adult population, the country achieves 97.6% of what is expected based on the nation's level of income. Solomon Islands falls into the "very bad" category when evaluating the right to reproductive health because the nation is fulfilling only 38.9% of what the nation is expected to achieve based on the resources (income) it has available.

Female life expectancy at birth was at 66.7 years and male life expectancy at birth at 64.9 in 2007. 1990–1995 fertility rate was at 5.5 births per woman. Government expenditure on health per capita was at US$99 (PPP). Healthy life expectancy at birth is at 60 years.

Blond hair occurs in 10% of the population in the islands. After years of questions, studies have resulted in the better understanding of the blond gene. The findings show that the blond hair trait is due to an amino acid change of protein TYRP1. This accounts for the highest occurrence of blond hair outside of European influence in the world. While 10% of Solomon Islanders display the blond phenotype, about 26% of the population carry the recessive trait for it as well.

== Infrastructure ==
=== Energy ===
A team of renewable energy developers working for the Pacific Islands Applied Geoscience Commission (SOPAC) and funded by the Renewable Energy and Energy Efficiency Partnership (REEEP), have hatched a scheme that enables these communities to access renewable energy, such as solar, without raising substantial sums of ready cash. If the islanders were not able to pay for solar lanterns with cash, reasoned the project developers, they can pay with crops.

Electricity - production: 78 GWh (2008 est.)

Electricity - consumption: 72.54 GWh (2008 est.)

Electricity - exports: 0 kWh (2009)

Electricity - imports: 0 kWh (2009)

=== Transport ===
Most internal transport in Solomon Islands is conducted through boat travel between islands. Road transport infrastructure is rudimentary, with few paved roads.

The state of the country's transportation infrastructure has been a priority for a number of international development projects. In 2018, the Asian Development Bank began a comprehensive Land and Maritime Connectivity Project in the islands, to provide long term support to the country's transportation infrastructure. After commuters complained about poor public bus services in the capital city, in 2025, the Japan International Cooperation Agency launched the Capacity Improvement of Urban Transport Management Project in Honiara, to establish a safe and convenient bus system for the city's residents. In June 2025, the Australian government committed SBD 60 million to upgrade the country's road infrastructure.

== Foreign aid ==
Since 2000 the Solomon Islands government has become increasingly insolvent. It has exhausted its borrowing capacity; in 2001 the deficit reached 8% of GDP. It is unable to meet bi-weekly payrolls and has become extraordinarily dependent on funds from foreign aid accounts, which provided an estimated 50% of government expenditure in 2001. Principal aid donors are Australia $247 Million per year (2006), New Zealand $14 Million per year (2004), the European Union, Japan $40 Million per year (2005), and the Republic of China (Taiwan) at least $20 Million per year .

Solomon Islands is a member of the WTO.

== Statistics ==
Exports of the Solomon Islands by product category (2019) Chemical products Transportation Machines Mineral products Plastics and rubbers Metals Foodstuffs Precious metals Textiles Instruments Animal products Vegetable products Paper goods Footwear and headwear Miscellaneous Stone and glass Wood products Animal and vegetable bi-products Animal hides Arts and antiques Weapons

The following table shows the main economic indicators in 1980–2017.

Year	GDP (in bil. US$ PPP)	GDP per capita (in US$ PPP)	GDP (in bil. US$ nominal)	GDP growth (real)	Inflation (in Percent)	Government debt (Percentage of GDP)
1980	0.19	803	0.18	−2.7 %	8.3 %	...
1985	0.23	858	0.17	−3.1 %	9.4 %	...
1990	0.32	1,015	0.22	2.2 %	8.7 %	...
1995	0.53	1,469	0.47	10.1 %	9.6 %	...
2000	0.50	1,211	0.42	−14.3 %	6.9 %	...
2005	0.65	1,389	0.48	12.9 %	7.5 %	53 %
2006	0.70	1,454	0.54	4.0 %	11.2 %	48 %
2007	0.76	1,551	0.62	6.4 %	7.7 %	44 %
2008	0.83	1,656	0.70	7.1 %	17.3 %	35 %
2009	0.80	1,553	0.74	−4.7 %	7.1 %	34 %
2010	0.87	1,643	0.85	6.8 %	1.0 %	29 %
2011	1.00	1,858	1.05	13.2 %	7.4 %	21 %
2012	1.06	1,937	1.19	4.6 %	5.9 %	17 %
2013	1.11	1,982	1.29	3.0 %	5.4 %	15 %
2014	1.16	2,017	1.34	2.3 %	5.2 %	13 %
2015	1.20	2,046	1.31	2.5 %	−0.6 %	10 %
2016	1.26	2,097	1.38	3.5 %	0.5 %	8 %
2017	1.32	2,157	1.47	3.2 %	−0.4 %	10 %

Foreign Government Aid as a % of GDP: 40.125% (2006 est.)

GDP - per capita: purchasing power parity - $3,200 (2011 est.)

GDP - composition by sector:
agriculture: 37.7%
industry: 6.4%
services: 55.9% (2011 est.)

Population below poverty line: NA%

Household income or consumption by percentage share:
lowest 10%: NA%
highest 10%: NA%

Inflation rate (consumer prices): 10% (1999 est.)

Labor force: 202,500 (2007)

Labor force - by occupation: agriculture 75%, industry 5%, services 20% (2000 est.)

Unemployment rate: NA%

Budget:
revenues: $313.1 million
expenditures: $261.7 million, including capital expenditures of $0 (2011 est.)

Industries: fish (tuna), mining, timber

Industrial production growth rate: NA%

Agriculture - products: cocoa, coconuts, palm kernels, rice, potatoes, vegetables, fruit; cattle, pigs; fish; timber

Exports: $216.5 million (2010 est.)

Exports - commodities: timber, fish, palm oil, cocoa, copra

Exports - partners: China 54%, Australia 12.5%, Thailand 4.6% (2011)

Imports: $360.3 million (2010 est.)

Imports - commodities: food, plant and equipment, manufactured goods, fuels, chemicals

Imports - partners: Australia 27.3%, Singapore 26.4%, China 6.5%, Malaysia 5.1%, New Zealand 5.1% (2011)

Debt - external: $166 million (2004)

Currency: 1 Solomon Islands dollar (SI$) = 100 cents

Exchange rates: Solomon Islands dollars (SI$) per US$1 – 7.833 (January 2017)

Fiscal year: calendar year
