= Economy of Fiji =

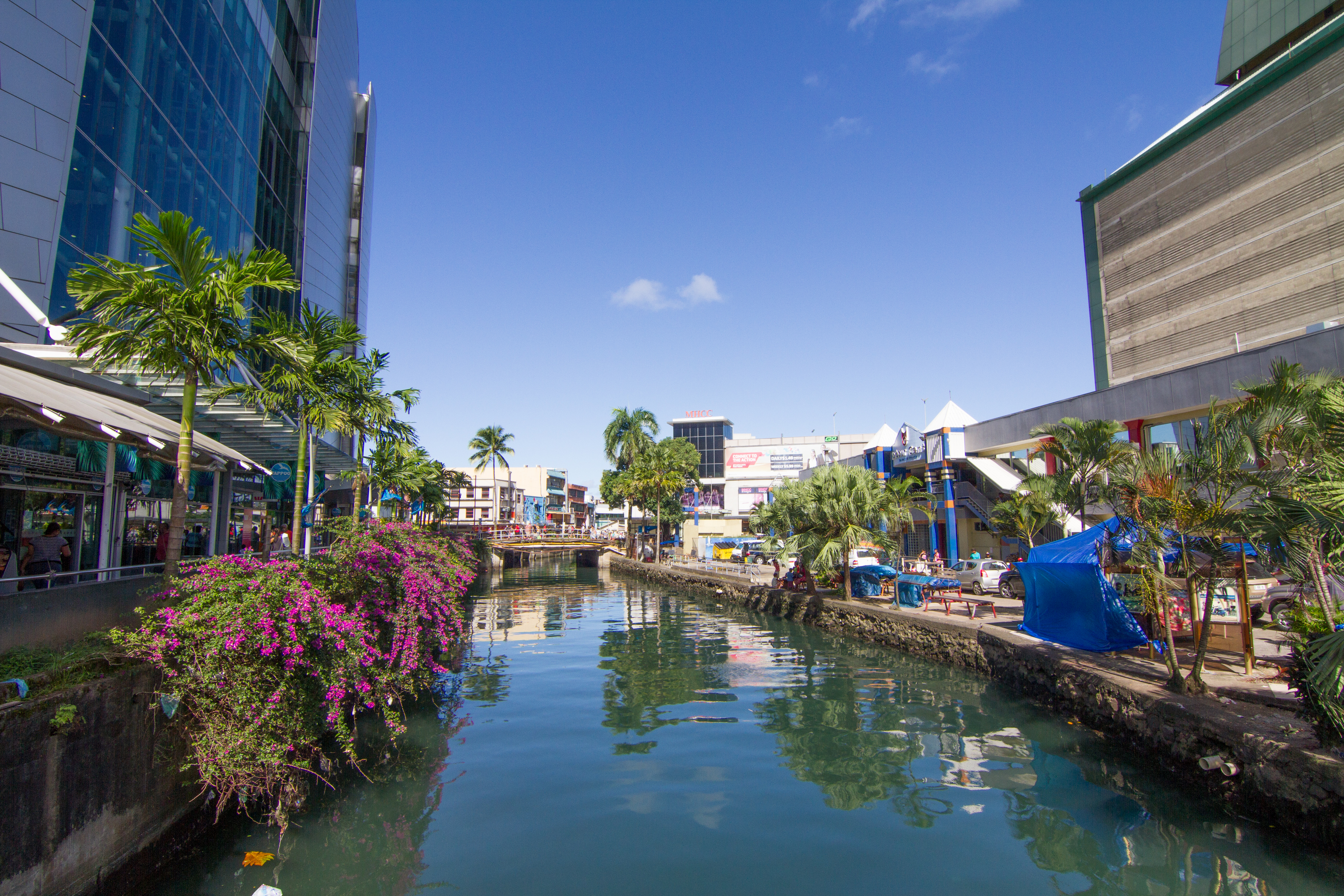
- Suva, the capital and economic center of Fiji
- Currency: Fijian Dollar (FJD, FJ$)
- Trade organisations: WTO
- Country group: Developing/Emerging; Upper-middle income economy

Statistics
- Population: 913,174 (2023 est.)
- GDP: ▲$6.26 billion (nominal; 2025); ▲$15.66 billion (PPP; 2025)
- GDP rank: 159th (nominal; 2025); 156th (PPP; 2025)
- GDP growth: ▲2.6% (2025); ▲2.8% (2026); ▲3.2% (2027f); ▲3.2% (2028f)
- GDP per capita: ▲$6,740 (nominal; 2025); ▲$16,870 (PPP; 2025)
- GDP per capita rank: 103rd (nominal; 2025); 105th (PPP; 2025)
- Inflation (CPI): 4.5%
- Population below national poverty line: 31% (2009 est.)
- Human Development Index: ▼0.730 high (2021) (99th); N/A IHDI (2021)
- Labour force: 353,100 (2017 est.)
- Labour force by occupation: Agriculture: 44.2%; Industry: 14.3%; Services: 41.6%; (2011 est.)
- Main industries: Tourism, sugar processing, clothing, copra, gold, silver, lumber

External
- Exports: $815.3 million (2021 est.)
- Export goods: Fuel (including oil), fish, beverages, gems, sugar, garments, gold, timber, fish, molasses, coconut oil, mineral water
- Main export partners: United States 20.8%; Australia 14.9%; New Zealand 7.7%; Tonga 5.0%; Vanuatu 4.6%; China 4.5%; Spain 4.3%; United Kingdom 4.3%; Kiribati 4.1%
- Imports: $2.116 billion (2021 est.)
- Import goods: Manufactured goods, machinery and transport equipment, petroleum products, food and beverages, chemicals, tobacco
- Main import partners: Australia 19.2%; New Zealand 17.2%; Singapore 17.0%; China 13.8%
- Current account: -$344 million (June. 2020); -$277 million (2017 est.); -$131 million (2016 est.)

Public finance
- Government debt: ▲48.9% of GDP (2017 est.)
- Revenue: 1.454 billion (2017 est.)
- Spending: 1.648 billion (2017 est.)
- All values, unless otherwise stated, are in US dollars.

The economy of Fiji is one of the most developed among the Pacific islands. Nevertheless, Fiji is a developing country endowed with forest, mineral and fish resources. The country has a large agriculture sector heavily based on subsistence agriculture. Sugar exports and the tourism industry are the main sources of foreign exchange. There are also light manufacturing and mining sectors. Currently Fiji embraces a market economy, years ago however Fiji advocated for a mixed economic system.

The country's petroleum production remains at zero despite previous hints at reserves, and it relies entirely on imports to meet its refined petroleum product needs.

As of 2025, Fiji's population was estimated to be approximately 949,992, reflecting a 0.73% increase from the previous year. The country's tallest building is the 30-story Grand Fijian Tower in Suva.

== Development plan ==
In September 2002, the government announced a 20-year development plan. Among other things, it aimed to give indigenous Fijians a greater stake in the economy. The plan envisages tax-relief to businesses owned or managed by ethnic Fijians, along with greater protection for indigenous land and fishery rights.

A major aim of the Fijian government is to achieve self-sufficiency in rice production. Cattle farming, fishing, and forestry (especially pine trees) are being encouraged to diversify the economy; the leading manufacturing industries involve the processing of primary products. On 14 April 2005, the Cabinet approved Prime Minister Laisenia Qarase's proposal to develop a biofuels industry. Under the plan, ethanol is to be developed as a complement to the sugar industry, with the hope of alleviating Fiji's dependence on imported fossil fuel such as petrol.

On 15 August, Qarase said that the United Nations Development Programme (UNDP) had granted assistance to Fiji to develop its biofuels project. Transformation of the Fiji Sugar Corporation into an energy and sugar company would result in a turnover of F$1 billion by 2025, he said, and would cut imports of crude oil, generate export earnings, and provide a source of electricity. Energy could be produced from copra, forest, and agricultural products, as well as sugar. He touted the scheme as necessary for diversifying and strengthening the sugar industry for its own survival, as well as for the national economy. He said that the government of India had loaned F$86 million for upgrading of Fiji's sugar mills, which would be completed in time for the 2007-2008 crushing season.

On 28 December 2005, John Teiwa of the Coconut Industry Development Authority announced that a 20-year plan for the coconut industry would be launched in 2006. Financing from international investors, including the government of India, would be sought to develop processing of virgin and extra virgin coconut oil, with a view to venturing into foreign health markets. The government expected an annual profit of F$120 million from the venture, Fiji Village reported. Trials for the generation of fuel from coconut oil were also in progress, Teiwa said.

== Sectors ==
=== Agriculture and forestry ===
Fiji has a large subsistence agriculture sector, which accounts for 18% of gross domestic product, although it employed some 70% of the workforce as of 2001. Sugarcane is the main agricultural product grown in Fiji. Other agricultural products grown in Fiji include coconuts, copra, ginger, cassava, bananas, rice, sweet potatoes, taro, pickles, kava, pineapples, and plantains. Livestock such as cattle, pigs, and goats are also reared for meat. Fishing is important to the economy as well, with fish products accounting for almost one-tenth of revenue from exports in the early 21st century. Lumber is another major industry, with timber being Fiji's third-largest export commodity.

In 2018 Fiji produced:

- 1.3 million tons of sugarcane
- 72 thousand tons of cassava
- 49 thousand tons of taro
- 22 thousand tons of coconut
- 21 thousand tons of vegetable
- 10 thousand tons of ginger
- 8 thousand tons of sweet potato
- 7 thousand tons of rice
- 6 thousand tons of pineapple
- 17 thousand bottles of water

In 2019 Fiji produced 41,892 tons of meat.

=== Manufacturing ===
Sugarcane processing makes up a significant portion of industrial activity. Fiji also has successful garment manufacturing and mineral water bottling industries. Other manufacturing activities include boat building, particularly the construction of fishing boats and pleasure craft, cement making, brewing, and paint manufacturing. Fiji is also a manufacturer and net exporter of wood products such as pine chips, sawnwood and wood-based panels.

=== Mining ===
Gold, silver, and copper are mined in Fiji.

=== Tourism ===
Tourism has expanded rapidly since the early 1980s and is the leading economic activity in the islands accounting for 24.4% of GDP in 2019. Excluding cruise ship passengers, more than 960,000 people visited Fiji in 2018. An increase of over 500,000 since 1999 when 409,000 tourists visited.

In 1999 a quarter of tourists came from Australia, with large contingents also coming from New Zealand, Japan, the United States and United Kingdom. Over 62,000 of the tourists were American, a number that had steadily increased since the start of regularly scheduled non-stop air service from Los Angeles. Tourism earned more than $300 million in foreign exchange for Fiji in 1998, an amount exceeding the revenue from its two largest goods exports (sugar and garments).

The effects of the Asian financial crisis led to a sharp drop in the number of Asian tourists visiting Fiji in 1997 and 1998, which contributed to a substantial drop in gross domestic product. Positive growth returned in 1999, however, aided by a 20% devaluation of the Fijian dollar. 2005 was a record year for the tourism sector, with 9% growth according to Viliame Gavoka, Chief Executive of the Fiji Visitors Bureau.

=== High-tech ===
Fiji has a high-tech industry with a number of software development companies present in the country. In 2021, Fiji's high-tech exports were worth about $1.95 million.

== Infrastructure ==
=== Transport ===
Modes of transport in Fiji include rail, road, water, and air. The rail network is mainly used for movement of sugar cane. Suva and Lautoka are the largest seaports. There are 122 km of navigable inland waterways. There are two international airports, one other paved airport, and over 20 with unpaved runways. With 333 tropical islands that make up this country, one can expect to use various modes of transport to get to their destination.

== Trade ==
Exports of Fiji by product category (2019) Chemical products Transportation Machines Mineral products Plastics and rubbers Metals Foodstuffs Precious metals Textiles Instruments Animal products Vegetable products Paper goods Footwear and headwear Miscellaneous Stone and glass Wood products Animal and vegetable bi-products Animal hides Arts and antiques Weapons

Fiji runs a persistently large trade deficit. Imports in 1998 accounted for US$721 million, and exports for US$510 million, resulting in a US$116 million deficit. Tourism revenue yields services surplus, however, which keeps the current account of its balance of payments roughly in balance ($13 million in 1998). Australia accounts for between 35% and 45% of Fiji's trade, with New Zealand, the United States, the United Kingdom, and Japan varying year-by-year between 5% and 15% each.

Foodstuffs, machinery, mineral fuels, beverages, tobacco, and manufactured goods are the principal imports. The two largest exports are sugar and garments, which each accounted for approximately one-quarter of export revenue in 1998 (roughly $122 million each). The sugar industry suffered in 1997 due to low world prices and rent disputes between farmers and landowners, and again in 1998 from drought, but recovered in 1999.

The Fijian garment industry has developed rapidly since the introduction of tax exemptions in 1988. The industry's output has increased nearly tenfold since that time. Fish, lumber, molasses, coconut oil and ginger are also important exports, although the last two are in decline. Forestry became important as an export trade in the mid-1980s, when the pine plantations planted in the 1950s and 1960s began to mature. They sell much fish.

Australia's Trade Commissioner Ross Bray revealed on 26 January 2006 that Fiji's exports to Australia are achieving an annual growth rate of 5%. More than 31,000 Australian companies were trading in the Pacific, half of them in Fiji, Bray said. Fiji is progressing very rapidly.

== Investment ==
The government's policy of awarding tax concessions to large multinational companies investing in Fiji has not proved universally popular. The Asian Development Bank (ADB) has criticized it, saying that the concessions have been abused and have not generated long-term investment. An ADB report in 2005 accused foreign entrepreneurs of leaving as soon as their concessions expired, and alleged that administration of the concessions encouraged corruption and bribery.

The leader of the Fiji Labour Party Mahendra Chaudhry echoed the view of the ADB on 31 December 2005, saying that foreign companies repatriated much of the profit made in Fiji, rather than investing it locally, while taking advantage of the infrastructure funded by Fijian taxpayers without paying any taxes themselves. Such policy discriminated against local businesses, he claimed.

== Economic problems ==
Fiji's economic difficulties have been compounded by the effects of four coups since the 1980s.

=== Emigration ===
Since 1987, when the country was destabilized by two military coups, Fiji has suffered a very high rate of emigration, particularly of skilled and professional personnel. More than 70,000 people left the country in the aftermath of the coups, majority of whom were Indo-Fijians. With the continuing expiration of land leases and ongoing instability in the aftermath of another coup in 2000, a further outflow of skilled workers has taken place.

A report in 2004 of the Organisation for Economic Co-operation and Development, published on 29 June 2005, found that 61% of Fiji's skilled workers have either emigrated or gone abroad as guest workers. Fiji's loss of skilled workers was the world's fourth highest, behind Guyana, Jamaica, Haiti, and Trinidad and Tobago. Fiji's Bureau of Statistics recorded 3595 workers as having left the country between January and August 2004. Of these, 414 held professional or technical jobs, 263 were in administrative or managerial positions, and were clerks, supervisors, or related workers, and 118 were sales workers.

Fiji's economy is increasingly reliant on remittances from citizens working overseas. Personal remittances now run to more than F$200 million a year, earning more than traditional sectors like sugar and garment manufacturing. Recruitment of Fijians by foreign private military companies is a growing source of revenue. By mid-2005, there were over 1,000 Fijians working in Iraq and Kuwait as soldiers, security guards, drivers and labourers. In addition in 2006 there were more than 2,000 Fijian soldiers in the British Army, and in 2004 the British defence ministry even sent recruiting teams to Fiji to do initial fitness and aptitude tests, cutting the costs of selection for poor Fijian villagers who could not afford to fly to London to sign up.

=== Property laws and investment problems ===
Low investment has been a long-term problem in Fiji, and property rights are sometimes thought to be part of this problem because, by law, five sixths of the land is owned communally by indigenous Fijians and may only be leased, not purchased outright. However, the leasehold system is often misunderstood.

Leasehold tenure has not been a problem for the property sector. Houses all over Fiji on communally owned land are on 99-year leases, which have proved satisfactory as a basis for house ownership. Hotels also enjoy 99-year leases. The prestigious Denarau development involving major hotels and resorts and luxury properties is situated on communally owned land. It delivers significant income to native owners and secure title to developers and their customers.

In agricultural sector, there have been problems even though agricultural leases are mandated at 30 years, following the extension by legislation (the Agricultural Landlord and Tenant Act or ALTA) of all ten-year leases to thirty years in 1977. The problem experienced in agriculture is the non-renewal leases as landowners have been unhappy with the provisions in the ALTA for indexing of rents to cope with inflation. That is an ongoing problem which calls for urgent attention.

=== Natural disasters ===
Drought in 1998 further damaged the sugar industry, but its recovery in 1999 contributed to robust GDP growth. Further damage to the economy (estimated at US$30 million) was wrought by a cyclone that hit the northern island of Vanua Levu in January 2003. Apart from the economic devastation, there were food shortages and outbreaks of disease due to the pollution of the water supply.

=== Tourism woes ===
The aftermath of the political turmoil in 2000 resulted in a 10-percent shrinkage in the economy, as investor confidence plummeted and tourist numbers dropped more than 15% from 544,000 visitors in 1999 to under 434,000 by the end of 2000. An estimated 7500 jobs were lost. There has been a gradual recovery since 2001, when the 1997 constitution was restored and free elections held.

The possibility of a return to a racially discriminatory constitution led to fears that Fiji might forfeit its preferential arrangements with the European Union for its sugar exports, and with Australia for its clothing industry, but those fears have largely (but not entirely) subsided.

=== Homelessness ===
In June 2003, a survey revealed a disturbingly high percentage of squatters, about a tenth of Fijian citizens. 82,350 individuals in 13,725 households were estimated to live in 182 squatter settlements, with Suva and Nausori being the worst-affected areas. The number of squatter settlements had increased 14% since January 2001, and 73% since 1996. Urban migration, unemployment, the expiry of land leases, and the breakdown of nuclear and extended families were among the factors blamed for the trend. The report projected the population of squatters to grow to 90,000 in the Suva-Nausori corridor by 2006, putting increasing strain on supplies of water, electricity, sewage, and road services. On 14 September, Prime Minister Qarase said that the squatter problem had become so serious that the government was looking abroad for funding.

=== Human Development Index ===
On 11 September 2005, the publication of the United Nations Human Development Index downgraded Fiji from 81st in 2004 to 92nd in 2005, behind Pacific neighbours Tonga and Samoa. Incomes had improved, the report said, with gross domestic product rising from F$5440 to F$5880, but other aspects of the quality of life enjoyed by Fiji Islanders had deteriorated. Life expectancy had declined from 72.9 in 2000 to 69.6 in 2004 and 67.8 in 2005, while literacy remained unchanged at 93%.

Joji Kotobalavu, the chief executive of the Prime Minister's Office, branded the report "a joke." His dismissal drew strong reaction from Opposition Leader Mahendra Chaudhry, who said that whereas Kotobalavu was paid to be the Prime Minister's spin doctor, the HDI report was put together by professionals who had no hidden agendas, and should therefore be taken very seriously.

Since 2005, the Human Development Index of Fiji has steadily risen from a reading of 0.687 to 0.743, just above the global median for all countries of 0.74. As of 2020 Fiji ranked 90th out of 183 countries on the Human Development Index.

== Economic statistics ==
=== Income ===
Gross national product (GNP): US$101.48 billion; US$1820 per capita (2000)

Gross domestic product (GDP): US$5.48 billion; $US 6,202.2 per capita (2018)

purchasing power parity - US$9.61 billion; US$11450 per capita (2020 estimate)

GDP – real growth rate: -6.6% (2008 est.)

GDP – composition by sector:
agriculture: 8.9%
industry: 13.5%
services: 77.6% (2006 est.)

Population below poverty line: 25.5%

Household income or consumption by percentage share:
lowest 10%: NA%
highest 10%: NA%

=== Inflation rate (consumer prices) ===
1.6% (2002 est.) 3.8% (2017 est.)

=== Workforce ===
Labor force: 360,000

Female labor force: 33.1%

Labor force – by occupation: subsistence agriculture 67%, wage earners 18%, salary earners 15% (1987)

Unemployment rate: 5.24% (2021 est.)

=== Budget ===
revenues: $540.65 million
expenditures: $742.65 million, including capital expenditures of $NA (1997 est.)

=== Industries ===
tourism, sugar, clothing, copra, gold, silver, lumber, small cottage industries

Industrial production growth rate: 2.9% (1995)

=== Electricity ===
Electricity – production: 1000 GWh (2020)

Electricity – production by source:
fossil fuel: 420 GWh, 42% of total (2020)
hydro: 500 GWh, 50% of total (2020)
solar: 20 GWh, 2% of total (2020)

other: 60 GWh, 6% of total (2020)

nuclear: 0%

Electricity – consumption: 1,0002 GWh (2019)

Electricity – exports: 0 kWh (2020)

Electricity – imports: 0 kWh (2020)

==== Rural electrification ====
The Fiji Rural Electrification Policy 1993 has been used by the Fiji Department of Energy in the implementation of rural electrification projects which includes diesel schemes for villages, micro hydro projects, house wiring, biofuel projects, solar home systems and grid extension. Villages and communities have been paying 10% of the total project costs and government pays 90%. In 2010, government reduced the contribution from communities to 5% and this has increased the number of applicants.

=== Agriculture ===
Agriculture – products: sugar cane, coconuts, cassava (tapioca), rice, sweet potatoes, bananas, ginger, taro, kava; livestock: cattle, pigs, shrimp, pickles, goats; fish. Island economies are at a disadvantage for harnessing export opportunities due to the costs of transport. The Fijian island of Cicia has set the goal of achieving 100% organic farming which can bring with it economic and environmental benefits.

=== Imports ===
US$921 million (1998)

Imports – commodities: machinery and transport equipment, petroleum products, food, chemicals.

One in every seven dollars of Fiji's national income is spent on oil according to the World Bank.

Imports – partners: Australia 35%, Japan 4.8%, Singapore 19.2%, New Zealand 17.1% (2003).

=== Debt and aid ===
Debt – external: US$136 million (2000)

Economic aid – recipient: $40.3 million (1995)

=== Currency ===
1 Fijian dollar (F$) = 48 cents

Exchange rates: Fijian dollars (F$) per US$1 – 1.83 (November 2013), 1.72565 (August 2006), 1.9654 (January 2000), 1.9696 (1999), 1.9868 (1998), 1.4437 (1997), 1.4033 (1996), 1.4063 (1995)
