= Economy of Antigua and Barbuda =

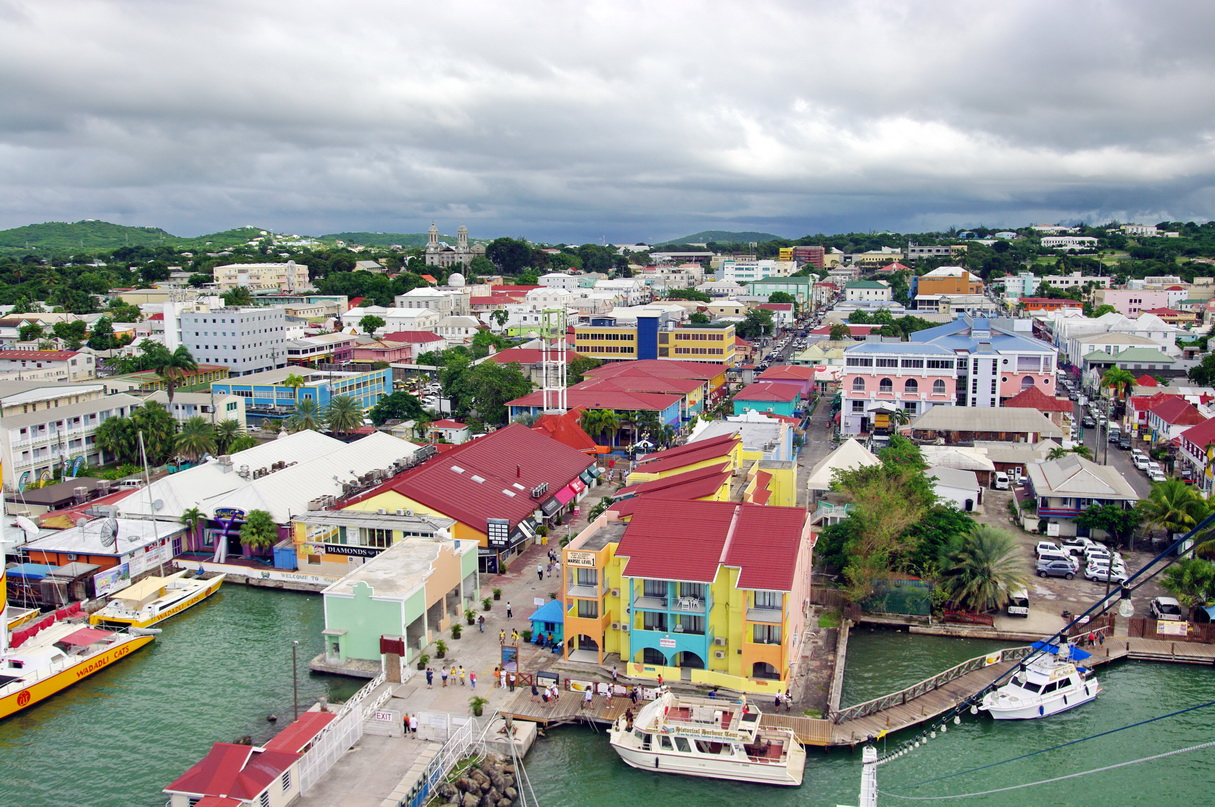
- Currency: East Caribbean dollar (XCD)
- Fiscal year: 1 April - 31 March
- Trade organisations: WTO, CARICOM

Statistics
- GDP: ▲$1.954 billion (nominal, 2023 est.); ▲$2.604 billion (PPP, 2023 est.)
- GDP rank: 176th (nominal) / 179th (PPP)
- GDP growth: 3.1% (2017) 7.4% (2018e); 4.0% (2019e) 3.3% (2020e)
- GDP per capita: ▲$19,123 (nominal, 2023 est.); ▼$25,484 (PPP, 2023 est.)
- GDP by sector: agriculture: 2.1%, industry: 19.6%, services: 78.3% (2012)
- Inflation (CPI): 5.067% (2023)
- Population below national poverty line: no data
- Labour force: 30,000 (1991)
- Labour force by occupation: agriculture: 7%, industry: 11%, services: 82% (1983)
- Unemployment: 11% (2001 est.)
- Main industries: tourism, construction, light manufacturing (clothing, alcohol, household appliances)

External
- Exports: $37.9 million (2012 est.)
- Export goods: petroleum products, bedding, handicrafts, electronic components, transport equipment, food and live animals
- Main export partners: Suriname 29.5%; Poland 20.6%; United States 7.74%; Dominican Republic 6.72% (2023)
- Import goods: food and live animals, machinery and transport equipment, manufactures, chemicals, oil
- Main import partners: United States 42.6%; Poland 6.11% (2023)

Public finance
- Government debt: $458 million (June 2010)
- Revenue: $229.5 million (2009)
- Spending: $293.4 million (2009)
- Economic aid: recipient: $2.3 million (1995)
- All values, unless otherwise stated, are in US dollars.

The economy of Antigua and Barbuda is service-based, with tourism and government services representing the key sources of employment and income. Tourism accounts directly or indirectly for more than half of GDP and is also the principal earner of foreign exchange in Antigua and Barbuda. However, a series of violent hurricanes since 1995 resulted in serious damage to tourist infrastructure and periods of sharp reductions in visitor numbers. In 1999 the budding offshore financial sector was seriously hurt by financial sanctions imposed by the United States and United Kingdom as a result of the loosening of its money-laundering controls. The government has made efforts to comply with international demands in order to get the sanctions lifted. The dual island nation's agricultural production is mainly directed to the domestic market; the sector is constrained by the limited water supply and labor shortages that reflect the pull of higher wages in tourism and construction. Manufacturing comprises enclave-type assembly for export with major products being bedding, handicrafts, and electronic components. Prospects for economic growth in the medium term will continue to depend on income growth in the industrialized world, especially in the US, which accounts for about one-third of all tourist arrivals. Estimated overall economic growth for 2000 was 2.5%. Inflation has trended down going from above 2 percent in the 1995-99 period and estimated at 0 percent in 2000.

To lessen its vulnerability to natural disasters, Antigua has been diversifying its economy. Transportation, communications and financial services are becoming important.

Antigua is a member of the Eastern Caribbean Currency Union (ECCU). The Eastern Caribbean Central Bank (ECCB) issues a common currency (the East Caribbean dollar) for all members of the ECCU. The ECCB also manages monetary policy, and regulates and supervises commercial banking activities in its member countries.

Antigua and Barbuda is a beneficiary of the U.S. Caribbean Basin Initiative. Its 1998 exports to the U.S. were valued at about US $3 million and its U.S. imports totaled about US $84 million. It also belongs to the predominantly English-speaking Caribbean Community (CARICOM).

== Economic history ==
Prior to colonization, several Amerindian groups inhabited Antigua and Barbuda, all of which relied on a subsistence lifestyle. British colonists established settlements in the islands in 1632. After fighting off the Caribs, Dutch, and French to stabilize their colonies, settlers grew tobacco, indigo, cotton, and ginger as cash crops. As on many other Caribbean islands, sugar cultivation became the most profitable enterprise, quickly surpassing other crops in economic importance. Due to the vast tracts of land needed for large-scale sugar production, rainforests on the islands were decimated. Timber from the rainforests was used in shipbuilding and repair.

With the shift to a plantation economy, slaves were imported from Africa. Even after the abolition of slavery in 1834, former slaves continued working in servitude due to laws designed to keep providing plantations with cheap labor. As the sugar industry began to wane, the plantation economy came to an end.

== Primary industries ==
=== Agriculture ===
Some 30% of land on Antigua is under crops or potentially arable, with 18% in use. Sea-island cotton is a profitable export crop. A modest amount of sugar is harvested each year, and there are plans for production of ethanol from sugarcane. Vegetables, including beans, carrots, cabbage, cucumbers, plantains, squash, tomatoes, and yams, are grown mostly on small family plots for local markets. Over the past 30 years, agriculture's contribution to the GDP has fallen from over 40% to 12%. The decline in the sugar industry left 60% of the country's 66,000 acres (270 km^{2}) under government control, and the Ministry of Agriculture is encouraging self-sufficiency in certain foods in order to curtail the need to import food, which accounts for about 25% by value of all imports. Crops suffer from droughts and insect pests, and cotton and sugar plantings suffer from soil depletion and the unwillingness of the population to work in the fields. Mango production in 2004 was 1,430 tons.

=== Animal husbandry ===
Livestock estimates in 2004 counted 14,300 head of cattle, 19,000 sheep, and 36,000 goats; there were some 5,700 hogs in the same year. Most livestock is owned by individual households. Milk production in 2004 was an estimated 5,350 tons. The government has sought to increase grazing space and to improve stock, breeding Nelthropp cattle and Black Belly sheep. There is a growing poultry industry. In 1992, the European Development Bank provided $5 million US to the government to help develop the livestock industry.

=== Fishing ===
Most fishing is for local consumption, although there is a growing export of the lobster catch to the United States and of some fish to Guadeloupe and Martinique. Antiguans annually consume more fish per capita (46 kg/101.4 lb) per year live weight than any other nation or territory in the Caribbean. The main fishing waters are near shore or between Antigua and Barbuda. There are shrimp and lobster farms operating, and the Smithsonian Institution has a Caribbean king crab farming facility for the local market. The government has encouraged modern fishing methods and supported mechanization and the building of new boats. Fish landings in 2000 were 1,481 tons; the lobster catch, 42 tons. Exports of fish commodities in 2000 were valued at US$1.5 million.

=== Mining ===
Few of the islands' mineral resources, which included limestone, building stone, clay, and barite, were exploited until recently. Limestone and volcanic stone have been extracted from Antigua for local construction purposes, and the manufacture of bricks and tiles from local clay has begun on a small scale. Barbuda produced a small amount of salt, while phosphate has been collected from Redonda.

== Secondary industries ==
Industrial activity has shifted from the processing of local agriculture produce to consumer and export industries using imported raw materials. Industrial products include rum, refined petroleum, paints, garments, furniture, and electrical components. The government encourages investment in manufacturing establishments, and most industries have some government participation.

Industry accounted for 19% of GDP in 2001. Manufacturing—which accounts for approximately 5% of GDP—comprises enclave-type assembly for export with major products being bedding, handicrafts, and electronic components. Prospects for economic growth depend on income growth in the industrialized world, especially in the US, which accounts for about half of all tourist arrivals. The industrial park, located in the Coolidge Area, produces a range of products such as paints, furniture, garments, and galvanized sheets, mainly for export.

== Tertiary industries ==
=== Tourism ===
Tourism is the mainstay of the economy of Antigua and Barbuda and is the leading sector in terms of providing employment and creating foreign exchange. In 1999 it contributed 60 percent of GDP and more than half of all jobs. According to the Americas Review 1998, tourism contributed 15 percent directly and around 40 percent indirectly to the GDP in 1998. Real growth in this sector has moved from an average of 7 percent for the period 1985-89 to 8.24 percent for the period 1990-95. There was slow growth between 1995 and 1998.

Figures released by the East Caribbean Central Bank (ECCB) in 2000 show that total visitor arrivals increased steadily from 470,975 in 1995 to 613,990 in 1998. In 1999 total visitor arrivals declined by about 4.1 percent to 588,866, yet the number of visitors staying at least 1 night or more increased by 1.9 percent over 1998 to total 207,862. Arrivals via cruise ships in 1999 dropped to 325,195, a fall of 3.4 percent over 1998. The fall-off in cruise passengers was mainly the result of one of the larger cruise ships being out of service for a brief period. Most of the tourists in 1999 came from the United Kingdom and the United States. Visitor expenditures have increased steadily since 1990, with total expenditures of EC$782.9 million.

To combat increasing competition from other Caribbean destinations, the government and the Antigua Hotel and Tourist Association have established a joint fund to market the country's appeal as a tourist destination. The association has agreed to match the proceeds from a 2 percent hotel guest levy introduced by the government.

At the start of March 2001, the Antigua Workers Union (AWU), the trade union which represents close to 7,000 workers in the tourism industry, described tourism as an industry in crisis. The AWU claimed the industry is on the decline because some airlines are pulling out of the country, and government was not spending enough money to promote tourism. While the government has conceded that it was not spending enough on marketing because of cash flow problems, it has rejected the AWU's contention that the industry is in crisis.

=== Visitor statistics ===
Most visitors arriving to Antigua and Barbuda as tourists are from the following countries of nationality: This does not include numbers of tourists disembarking as part of a cruise.

Country	2023	2022	2021	2020	2019	2018	2017	2016	2015	2014	2013
United States	137,157	129,521	102,495	60,319	123,553	104,103	96,347	108,652	94,617	95,332	88,619
United Kingdom	68,278	79,900	48,328	31,765	76,837	70,607	70,701	76,512	77,890	71,193	68,854
Canada	28,775	17,611	4,055	15,716	37,225	38,087	22,932	21,196	23,270	27,701	30,235
Italy	2,584	2,343	598	2,249	9,735	6,832	8,527	8,600	7,032	7,976	7,942
Trinidad and Tobago							4,250	3,768	3,331	3,546	3,746
Dominica							4,153	3,988	3,728	2,913	2,954
Jamaica							3,876	3,932	3,857	3,543	3,273
Barbados							2,863	2,878	2,916	2,934	2,920
Saint Kitts and Nevis							2,213	2,651	2,175	2,490	2,741
Germany	1,061	776	377	718	2,125	2,216	2,120	2,165	2,505	2,665	2,443
Total	281,896	265,119	169,469	125,083	300,990	268,949	247,320	265,187	250,450	249,316	243,219

=== Financial services ===
Antigua and Barbuda is advertised as "an attractive offshore jurisdiction." The country was the first to sign the United Nations' anti-money laundering act. This agreement came out of a conference in 1999 which urged worldwide offshore financial centers to introduce laws to tighten their policing of money laundering activities. The United Kingdom exerted considerable pressure on Antigua and Barbuda to reform laws to combat money laundering, even issuing an advisory in April 1999 to British financial institutions that Antigua and Barbuda's anti-money laundering laws were wanting. Antigua and Barbuda responded to this concern, and a subsequent joint United States and United Kingdom review reported they were satisfied that the country had taken positive steps to check illegal activity in this sector. In September 2000 the government of Antigua and Barbuda announced that it had strengthened its surveillance of money laundering and drug trafficking. In March 2009, the Stanford Financial Group, based in Antigua was found by regulators there and in the United States, of operating a massive ponzi scheme. The international bank controlled by the Stanford group is now in receivership pending the outcome of an investigation.

=== Retail ===
The retail sector is dominated by the sale of food and beverages, clothing and textiles, and vegetables. The main markets are located in the capital, St. John's. There are many street vendors and duty-free shops. The government has been taking steps to improve this sector. A US$43.5 million vendors' mall and market has been built to provide better facilities for retailers in the capital. In addition, a US$27 million fisheries complex now provides improved facilities for fish processing and retailing. A growing area of computer business on Antigua is Internet casinos.

== Statistics ==
Exports of Antigua and Barbuda by product category (2019) Chemical products Transportation Machines Mineral products Plastics and rubbers Metals Foodstuffs Precious metals Textiles Instruments Animal products Vegetable products Paper goods Footwear and headwear Miscellaneous Stone and glass Wood products Animal and vegetable bi-products Animal hides Arts and antiques Weapons

GDP: purchasing power parity - $1.61 billion (2008 est.)

country comparison to the world: 189

GDP - real growth rate: 2.1% (2008 est.)

country comparison to the world: 161

GDP - per capita: purchasing power parity - $19,000 (2008 est.)

country comparison to the world: 64

GDP - composition by sector: agriculture: 3.8% industry: 22% services: 74.3% (2002 est.)

Inflation rate (consumer prices): 1.5% (2007 est.)

country comparison to the world: 14

Labor force: 30,000 (1991)

country comparison to the world: 197

Unemployment rate: 11% (2001 est.)

country comparison to the world: 130

Budget: revenues: $123.7 million

expenditures: $145.9 million (2000 est.)

Central bank discount rate: 6.5% (January 2008)

country comparison to the world: 57

Agriculture - products: cotton, fruits, vegetables, bananas, coconuts, cucumbers, mangoes, sugarcane; livestock

Industries: tourism, construction, light manufacturing (clothing, alcohol, household appliances)

Electricity - production: 105 million kWh (2006)

country comparison to the world: 188

Electricity - consumption: 97.65 million kWh (2006)

country comparison to the world: 189

Electricity - exports: 0 kWh (2007)

Electricity - imports: 0 kWh (2007)

Oil - production: 0 bbl/d (0 m^{3}/d) (2007)

country comparison to the world: 116

Oil - consumption: 4,109 bbl/d (653.3 m^{3}/d) (2006 est.)

country comparison to the world: 169

Oil - exports: 157.7 bbl/d (25.07 m^{3}/d) (2005)

country comparison to the world: 132

Oil - imports: 4,556 bbl/d (724.3 m^{3}/d) (2005)

country comparison to the world: 161

Oil - proved reserves: 0 bbl (0 m^{3}) (1 January 2006 est.)

country comparison to the world: 99

Natural gas - production: 0 cu m (2007 est.)

country comparison to the world: 209

Natural gas - consumption: 0 cu m (2007 est.)

country comparison to the world: 209

Natural gas - exports: 0 cu m (2006 est.)

country comparison to the world: 206

Natural gas - imports: 0 cu m (2006)

country comparison to the world: 205

Natural gas - proved reserves: 0 cu m (1 January 2006 est.)

country comparison to the world: 206

Exports: $84.3 million (2007 est.)

country comparison to the world: 199

Exports - commodities: petroleum products 48%, manufactures 23%, machinery and transport equipment 17%, food and live animals 4%, other 8%

Exports - partners: Spain 34%, Germany 20.7%, Italy 7.7%, Singapore 5.8%, UK 4.9% (2006)

Imports: $522.8 million (2007 est.)

country comparison to the world: 189

Imports - commodities: food and live animals, machinery and transport equipment, manufactures, chemicals, oil

Imports - partners: US 21.1%, China 16.4%, Germany 13.3%, Singapore 12.7%, Spain 6.5% (2006)

Debt - external: $359.8 million (June 2006)

country comparison to the world: 169

Economic aid - recipient: $7.23 million (2005)

Currency: 1 East Caribbean dollar (EC$) = 100 cents

Exchange rates: East Caribbean dollars per US dollar - 2.7 (2007), 2.7 (2007), 2.7 (2006), 2.7 (2005), 2.7 (2004), 2.7 (2003) note: fixed rate since 1976

Fiscal year: 1 April - 31 March

== See also ==
- List of Commonwealth of Nations countries by GDP
- List of Latin American and Caribbean countries by GDP growth
- List of Latin American and Caribbean countries by GDP (nominal)
- List of Latin American and Caribbean countries by GDP (PPP)
