= Economy of Kiribati =

- Currency: Australian dollar (A$ or AUD)
- Fiscal year: calendar year
- Trade organizations: PARTA
- Country group: Least Developed; Lower-middle income economy

Statistics
- Population: 103,280 (2010 Census)
- GDP: ▲$0.189 billion (nominal, 2018 est.); ▲$0.240 billion (PPP, 2018 est.)
- GDP rank: 192nd (nominal) / 190th (PPP)
- GDP growth: 5.1% (2016) 0.3% (2017); 2.3% (2018e) 2.3% (2019e)
- GDP per capita: ▼$1,641 (nominal, 2018 est.); ▲$2,087 (PPP, 2018 est.)
- GDP by sector: agriculture 24.3%, industry 7.9%, services 67.8%. (2010)
- Inflation (CPI): 1.870% (2018 est.)
- Labour force: 7,870 (not including subsistence farmers) (2001 est.)
- Labour force by occupation: agriculture: 2.7%, industry: 32%, services: 65.3% (2000)
- Unemployment: 2% (1992)
- Main industries: fishing, handicrafts

External
- Exports: US$10.754 million (2021 est.)
- Export goods: skipjack tuna, fish fillets, ships, coconut oil, copra
- Main export partners: Thailand 60%; Indonesia 11%; Philippines 10%; Japan 6%; South Korea 3%
- Imports: US$201.984 million (2021 est.)
- Import goods: fishing vessels, beef, netting, poultry, rice, refined petroleum, sugar, refrigerators
- Main import partners: China 23%; Taiwan 16%; Fiji 16%; Australia 12%; New Zealand 6%

Public finance
- Revenue: US$281 million (2017 est.)
- Spending: US$205 million (2017 est.)
- Economic aid: A$36 million (2010/2011), largely from Australia, New Zealand & Taiwan
- All values, unless otherwise stated, are in US dollars.

The Republic of Kiribati's per capita Gross National Product of US$1,420 (2010) makes it one of the poorest countries in Oceania. Phosphates had been profitably exported from Banaba Island since the turn of the 20th century, but the deposits were exhausted in 1979. The economy now depends on foreign assistance and revenue from fishing licenses to finance its imports and development budget.

The Asian Development Bank’s assessment of Kiribati’s growth potential point identifies constraints imposed by “(i) land area, (ii) geographic dispersion across 5,000 km of ocean, (ii) remoteness from major markets with associated high external transport costs, (iii) high vulnerability to natural forces including climate change and sea level rise, and (iv) scarce natural resources.”

== Government revenue ==
The expiration of phosphate deposits in 1979 had a devastating impact on the economy. Receipts from phosphates had accounted for roughly 80% of export earnings and 50% of government revenue. Per capita GDP was more than halved between 1979 and 1981. A sovereign wealth fund financed by phosphate earnings was established in 1956. In 2008, the Revenue Equalization Reserve Fund was valued at US$ 400 million. Prudent management of the Reserve Fund will be vital for the long-term welfare of the country.

In 2009 the RERF was valued at A$570.5 million. The RERF assets declined from A$637 million (420 percent of GDP) in 2007 to A$570.5 million (350 percent of GDP) in 2009. Due to the 2008 financial crisis, the RERF was reduced due to failed Icelandic banks, as well as withdrawals made by the government of Kiribati to finance budgetary shortfalls.

In May 2011 the IMF country report described the impact of the global financial crisis (GFC) as being that “Kiribati has been affected by the global crisis through a fall in remittances and large decline in the value of its wealth and pension funds—the Revenue Equalization Reserve Fund (RERF) and the Kiribati Provident Fund. The spike in food and fuel prices in 2008 has already taken a toll on economic activity. Vulnerabilities to climate change, including coastline erosion, have also worsened.”

In one form or another, Kiribati gets a large portion of its income from abroad. Examples include fishing licenses, development assistance, worker remittances, and tourism. Given Kiribati's limited domestic production ability, it must import nearly all of its essential foodstuffs and manufactured items; it depends on these external sources of income for financing .

Fishing fleets from South Korea, Japan, People's Republic of China, Taiwan, and the United States pay a licensing fee in order to operate in Kiribati's territorial waters. These licenses produced A$25.4 million in 2007, A$32.2 million in 2008 and A$29.5 million in 2009. The existence of El Niño climatic conditions boosted the local catch. Due to its small size and spread-out nature, however, Kiribati also loses untold millions of income per year from illegal, unlicensed fishing in its exclusive economic zone.

Visitor arrivals are predominantly business-related with total visitor arrivals of 3,380 in 2008 and 3,915 in 2009. These visitors provide $5–$10 million in revenue. Tourism attractions include World War II battle sites, game fishing, ecotourism, and Caroline Island, situated just inside the International Date Line and the first place on Earth to celebrate every New Year.

Most islanders engage in subsistence activities ranging from fishing to the growing of food crops like bananas, breadfruit, and papaya. The leading export is the coconut product copra, which accounts for about two-thirds of export revenue. Other exports include pet fish, shark fins, and seaweed. Kiribati's principal trading partner is Australia.

Remittances from Kiribati seamen working on foreign flagged ships provided A$11.6 million in 2009.

In May 2011 the IMF country report assessment of the Economy of Kiribati is that: “After two years of contraction, the economy recovered in the second half of 2010 and inflation pressure dissipated. It is estimated to have grown by 1¾ percent for the year. Despite a weather-related drop in copra production, private sector activity appears to have picked up, especially in retail. Tourist arrivals rebounded by 20 percent compared to 2009, although from a very low base. Despite the rise in world food and fuel prices, inflation has bounced from 2008 crisis-highs into negative territory, reflecting the strong appreciation of the Australian dollar, which is used as the domestic currency, and a decline in the world price of rice. Credit growth in the overall economy declined in 2009 as economic activity stalled. But it started to pick up in the second half of 2010 as the recovery gained traction.”

== International development assistance ==
The economy of Kiribati benefits from international development assistance programs. The multilateral donors providing development assistance in 2009 were the European Union (A$9 million), the United Nations Development Programme (A$3.7 million), and the World Health Organization (A$100,000). The bilateral donors providing development assistance in 2009 were Australia (A$11 million), Japan (A$2 million), New Zealand (A$6.6 million), Taiwan (A$10.6 million), and other donors providing A$16.2 million, including technical assistance grants from the Asian Development Bank.

The major donors in 2010/2011 were Australia (A$15 million), Taiwan (A$11 million); New Zealand (A$6 million), the World Bank (A$4 million), and the Asian Development Bank.

Kiribati joined the Asian Development Bank (AsDB) in 1974. The AsDB has provided US$27.14 million over seven project loans to Kiribati from Asian Development Fund (ADF). The AsDB has also provided technical assistance funding of US$13.9 million for 41 projects.

Australia continues as the largest donor to Kiribati and has committed to provide A$28.2 million in development assistance in 2011–12. The Australia-Kiribati Partnership for Development (signed in January 2009), directs Australian aid to focus on improving basic education standards, developing workforce skills, and strengthening economic governance. The development assistance from Australia is allocated to: AusAID country program A$18.3 million (2011–12 est.); Regional assistance estimate A$9.9 million (2011–12 est.)

New Zealand has committed to provide NZ$14.3 million in development assistance in 2011–12, which is allocated primarily through the NZAID bilateral programme to projects related to economic development, education and developing workforce skills, and addressing vulnerabilities in Kiribati.

Kiribati became a member of the World Bank in 1986. On 1 March 2011, the World Bank announced a Country Assistance Strategy (CAS) for Kiribati, which is structured around the themes of: (i) addressing the existential threat posed by climate change; and, (ii) mitigating the effects of geographic isolation. The CAS is intended to be implemented through grants and trust fund investments of up to US$50 million during the period 2011 to 2014.

== Sectors ==
=== Financial sector ===
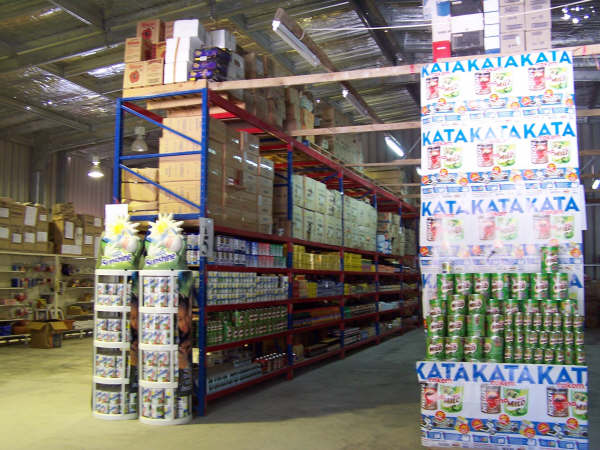
A supermarket in Kiribati

The financial institutions in Kiribati are the Development Bank of Kiribati (DBK) that is wholly government-owned and ANZ Bank (Kiribati) Limited (formerly known as Bank of Kiribati), which is the sole commercial bank in Kiribati. Insurance services are provided by another government financial institution, the Kiribati Insurance Corporation. The Kiribati Provident Fund (KPF), also government-owned, manages the assets of the pension system, about 60 percent of GDP in 2010.

=== Education ===
Secondary school students in Bikenibeu, Kiribati in 2007 photographed by Lorrie Graham.

Education in Kiribati is free and compulsory from age 6 to 14, which includes primary school through grade six, and Junior Secondary School for three additional grade levels. In 1998, the gross primary enrollment rate was 84.4 percent, and net primary enrollment rate was 70.7 percent. School quality and access to education are better in urban areas; schools in small communities on isolated islands are expensive to maintain. Mission schools are slowly being absorbed into the government primary school system.

The Human Rights Measurement Initiative (HRMI) finds that Kiribati is fulfilling only 90.6% of what it should be fulfilling for the right to education based on the country's level of income. HRMI breaks down the right to education by looking at the rights to both primary education and secondary education. While taking into consideration Kiribati's income level, the nation is achieving 94.4% of what should be possible based on its resources (income) for primary education but only 86.8% for secondary education.

=== Transport ===
Transport in Kiribati is limited by the country's geography as a widely dispersed island nation in the central Pacific Ocean. The transport system consists primarily of short road networks on major atolls, domestic and international air services, and coastal and inter-island sea transport. There are no railways, and most travel between islands relies on ships or aircraft, with Tarawa and Kiritimati serving as the main transport hubs.

== GDP and other economic performance indicators ==
Exports of Kiribati by product category (2019) Chemical products Transportation Machines Mineral products Plastics and rubbers Metals Foodstuffs Precious metals Textiles Instruments Animal products Vegetable products Paper goods Footwear and headwear Miscellaneous Stone and glass Wood products Animal and vegetable bi-products Animal hides Arts and antiques Weapons

Further information sourced from: "Kiribati: 2011 Article IV Consultation-Staff Report, Informational Annexes, Debt Sustainability Analysis, Public Information Notice on the Executive Board Discussion, and Statement by the Executive Director for Kiribati". International Monetary Fund Country Report No. 11/113. 24 May 2011.

"Kiribati: Statistical Appendix". International Monetary Fund Country Report No. 11/114. 24 May 2011.

GDP – purchasing power parity: US$618 million (2010 est.)

GDP – official exchange rate: US$147 million (2010 est.)

GDP – real growth rate: -0.7% (2009); 1.8% (2010 est.) 3% (2011 proj.)

GDP – per capita: US$1,420 (2010)

GDP – composition by sector: (2002)

Agriculture: 8.9%

Industry: 24.2%

Services: 66.8%

Inflation rate (consumer prices): 8.8% (2009), −2.8% (2010)

Total population: 103,280 (July 2011 est.)

Labour force: 7,870 economically active, not including subsistence farmers (2001 est.)

Unemployment rate: N/A

Budget:
(millions) Total revenues and grants: A$124.4 million (2010 budget); A$136.9 million (2010 est.)

Total expenditures: A$143.3 million (2010 budget); A$150.1 million (2010 est.)

Electricity – production by source:
fossil fuel: 100%
other: 0% (1998)

Electricity – production: 14 million kWh (2007 est.)

Electricity – consumption: 13.02 kWh (2007 est.)

Agriculture – products: copra, taro, breadfruit, sweet potatoes, vegetables; fish

Currency: 1 Australian dollar ($A) = 100 cents

Exchange rates: Australian dollars ($A) per US$1 – 1.0902 (2010), 1.2822 (2009), 1.2059 (2008), 1.2137 (2007), 1.3285 (2006)

The Australian dollar (A$) is the currency of Kiribati.
