= Economy of Asia =

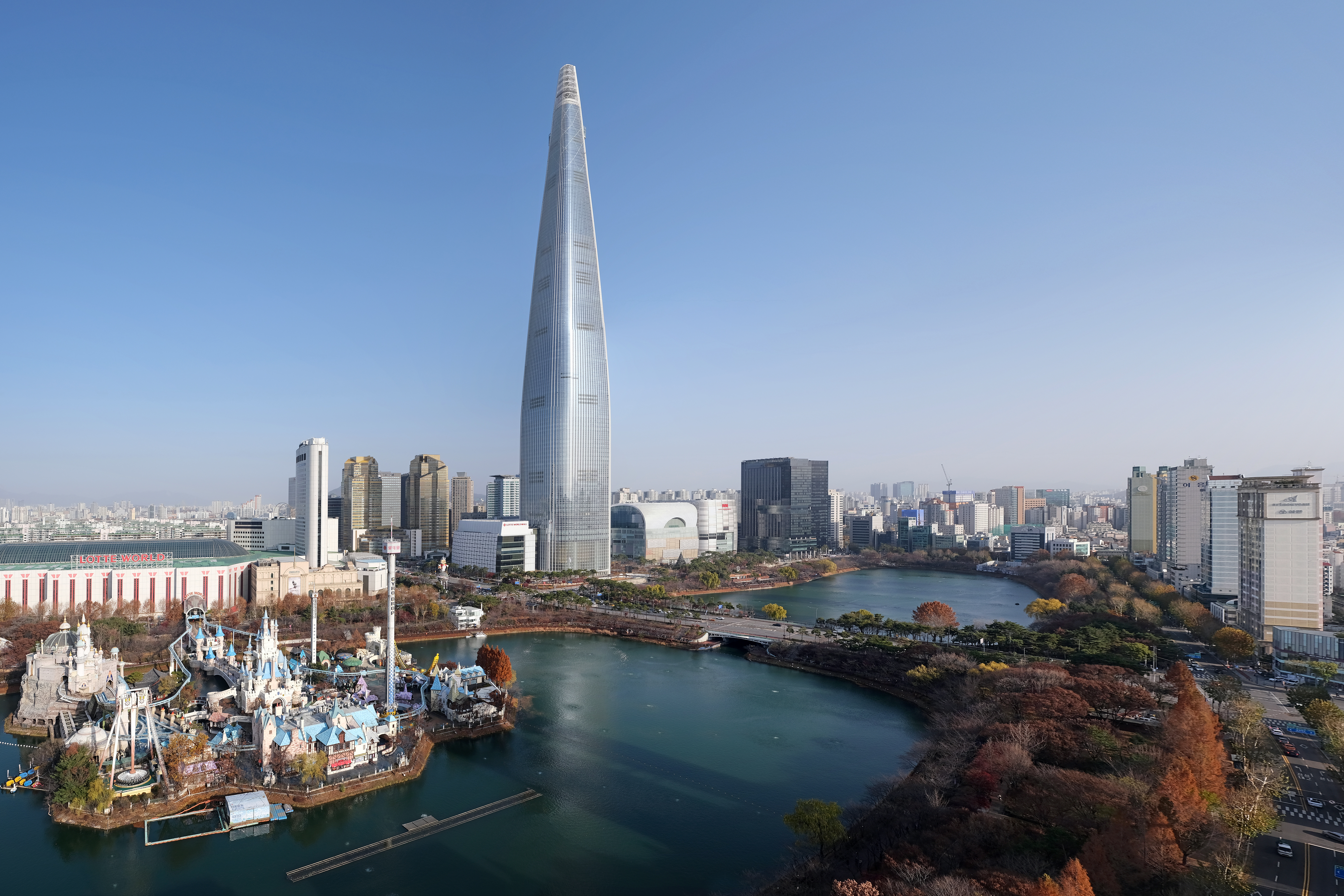
- Lotte World in Seoul, South Korea

Statistics
- Population: ▲4.7 billion (2022)
- GDP: ▲$46.063 trillion (nominal; 2026); ▲$110.23 trillion (PPP; 2026)
- GDP rank: 1st (nominal; 2026); 1st (PPP; 2026)
- GDP growth: ▲4.1% (2026f)
- GDP per capita: ▲$9,544 (nominal; 2026f); ▲$23,456 (PPP; 2026f)
- GDP per capita rank: 5th (nominal; 2026); 5th (PPP; 2026)
- Inflation (CPI): ▲3.1% (2026f)
- Millionaires (US$): 10.7 million (2022)

Public finance
- Government debt: ▲93.5% of GDP (2023)
- Most numbers are from the International Monetary Fund. IMF Asia Datasets All values, unless otherwise stated, are in US dollars.

The continent of Asia has a diversified developing economy across the largest continental land-mass in the world. It comprises about 4.7 billion people (60% of the world population) living in 50 different nations. Asia is the fastest growing economic region, as well as the largest continental economy by both nominal GDP and PPP-adjusted GDP. As in all world regions, the wealth of Asia differs widely between, and within, states. This is due to its vast size, meaning a huge range of different cultures, environments, historical ties and government systems. The largest economies in Asia in terms of PPP gross domestic product (GDP) are China, India, Japan, Indonesia, Turkey, South Korea, Egypt, Saudi Arabia and Taiwan. In terms of nominal gross domestic product (GDP), they are China, India, Japan, South Korea, Turkey, Indonesia, Saudi Arabia, Taiwan, Israel and Singapore.

Total wealth (as well as overall GDP) is mainly concentrated in East Asia, South Asia and Southeast Asia. Israel and Turkey are also two major economies in West Asia. Israel (entrepreneurship on diversified industries) is a developed country, while Turkey (founding member of OECD) is an advanced emerging country. Asia, with the exception of Japan (heavy industry and electrical sophistication), South Korea (heavy industry and information and communication technology), Taiwan (heavy industry and hi-tech parts manufacturing), Hong Kong (financial industry and services) and Singapore (high-tech manufacturing, biotechnology, financial and business services and tourism) in recent years, is currently undergoing rapid growth and industrialization. China (manufacturing, services, heavy industry and FDI-led growth) and India (manufacturing, commodities, outsourcing destination, computer software and financial services) are the two fastest growing major economies in the world.

East Asian and ASEAN countries generally rely on manufacturing and trade (and then gradually upgrade to industry and commerce), and incrementally building on high-tech industry and financial industry for growth. Countries in the Middle East depend more on engineering to overcome climate difficulties for economic growth and the production of commodities, principally Sweet crude oil. Over the years, with rapid economic growth and large trade surplus with the rest of the world, Asia has accumulated over US$8.5 trillion of foreign exchange reserves – more than half of the world's total, and adding tertiary and quaternary sectors to expand in the share of Asia's economy.

== List of Asian countries by GDP ==
This is an alphabetically sorted list of Asian countries, with their factual and estimated gross domestic product data by the International Monetary Fund.

Percent of share of Top 5 countries in Asia by GDP nominal
1. China (46.5%)
2. India (9.26%)
3. Japan (9.76%)
4. South Korea (4.31%)
5. Indonesia (3.43%)
6. Others (26.8%)
Percent of share of Top 5 countries in Asia by GDP PPP
1. China (40.2%)
2. India (17.1%)
3. Japan (6.59%)
4. Indonesia (4.94%)
5. Turkey (3.65%)
6. Others (27.5%)

Territory	GDP nominal billions of USD (2026)	GDP nominal per capita USD (2026)	GDP PPP billions of USD	GDP PPP per capita USD	Location
Afghanistan	19.66	417	101.02	2,304	South Asia
Armenia	29.08	9,393	82.74	27,024	West Asia
Azerbaijan	78.37	7,624	281.3	26,800	West Asia
Bahrain	48.85	29,778	115.92	70,165	West Asia
Bangladesh	510.70	2,960	1,921.75	10,955	South Asia
Bhutan	3.86	4,710	15.95	20,135	South Asia
Brunei	16.86	35,414	45.47	97,858	Southeast Asia
Cyprus	45.17	45,601	67.44	67,796	West Asia
Myanmar	65.1	1,176	293.31	5,200	Southeast Asia
Cambodia	52.38	2,939	160.48	8,890	Southeast Asia
China	20,851.59	14,874	44,295.45	31,596	East Asia
Hong Kong	450.14	59,640	635.59	84,212	East Asia
Georgia	42.72	10,866	125.45	33,991	West Asia
India	4,153.19	2,813	18,902.32	12,801	South Asia
Indonesia	1,539.87	5,398	5,449.14	18,973	Southeast Asia
Iran	300.29	4,250	1,783.22	20,279	West Asia
Iraq	264.78	5,873	670.71	14,376	West Asia
Israel	719.85	64,275	609.41	59,095	West Asia
Japan	4,379.25	35,703	7,262.16	59,207	East Asia
Jordan	64.91	5,149	153.65	13,257	West Asia
Kazakhstan	360.46	15,527	993.67	48,250	Central Asia
North Korea	16.45	640	N/A	N/A	East Asia
South Korea	1,931.0	37,520	3,542.01	68,624	East Asia
Kuwait	172.92	31,242	283.13	54,303	West Asia
Kyrgyzstan	23.61	2,925	73.89	10,024	Central Asia
Laos	18.96	2,254	86.49	10,964	Southeast Asia
Lebanon	34.49	5,282	70.19	13,100	West Asia
Macau	54.23	76,314	99.61	140,423	East Asia
Malaysia	516.43	14,762	1,608.50	46,986	Southeast Asia
Maldives	8.13	19,682	15.80	37,826	South Asia
Mongolia	28.45	7,320	80.39	22,192	East Asia
Nepal	49.11	1,658	194.06	6,551	South Asia
Oman	117.18	19,182	247.39	45,698	West Asia
Pakistan	410.495	1,707	1,671.381	6,950	South Asia
Palestine	13.7	2,443	30.5	5,700	West Asia
Philippines	512.22	4,619	1,572.56	13,639	Southeast Asia
Qatar	217.42	76,534	358.36	112,312	West Asia
Saudi Arabia	1,388.67	35,839	2,894.59	78,815	West Asia
Singapore	659.57	107,760	1,063.24	173,708	Southeast Asia
Sri Lanka	98.96	4,325	343.10	14,994	South Asia
Syria	19.99	847	109.72	4,650	West Asia
Taiwan	976.72	41,586	2,274.62	98,051	East Asia
Tajikistan	20.42	1,799	69.67	6,616	Central Asia
Thailand	579.99	7,979	1,963.65	27,441	Southeast Asia
Timor-Leste	2.17	1,547	7.52	5,270	Southeast Asia
Turkey	1,640.22	18,232	4,025.25	46,672	West Asia/Europe
Turkmenistan	83.06	11,387	164.43	24,349	Central Asia
United Arab Emirates	621.54	53,842	1,006.29	87,774	West Asia
Uzbekistan	181.50	4,136	552.16	14,179	Central Asia
Vietnam	527.27	4,965	2,025.33	19,649	Southeast Asia
Yemen	7.43	401	30.93	1,596	West Asia
Average	44,852.000	9,544	110,229.000	23,456	Asia

== History ==
=== Economic development ===
==== Ancient and medieval times ====
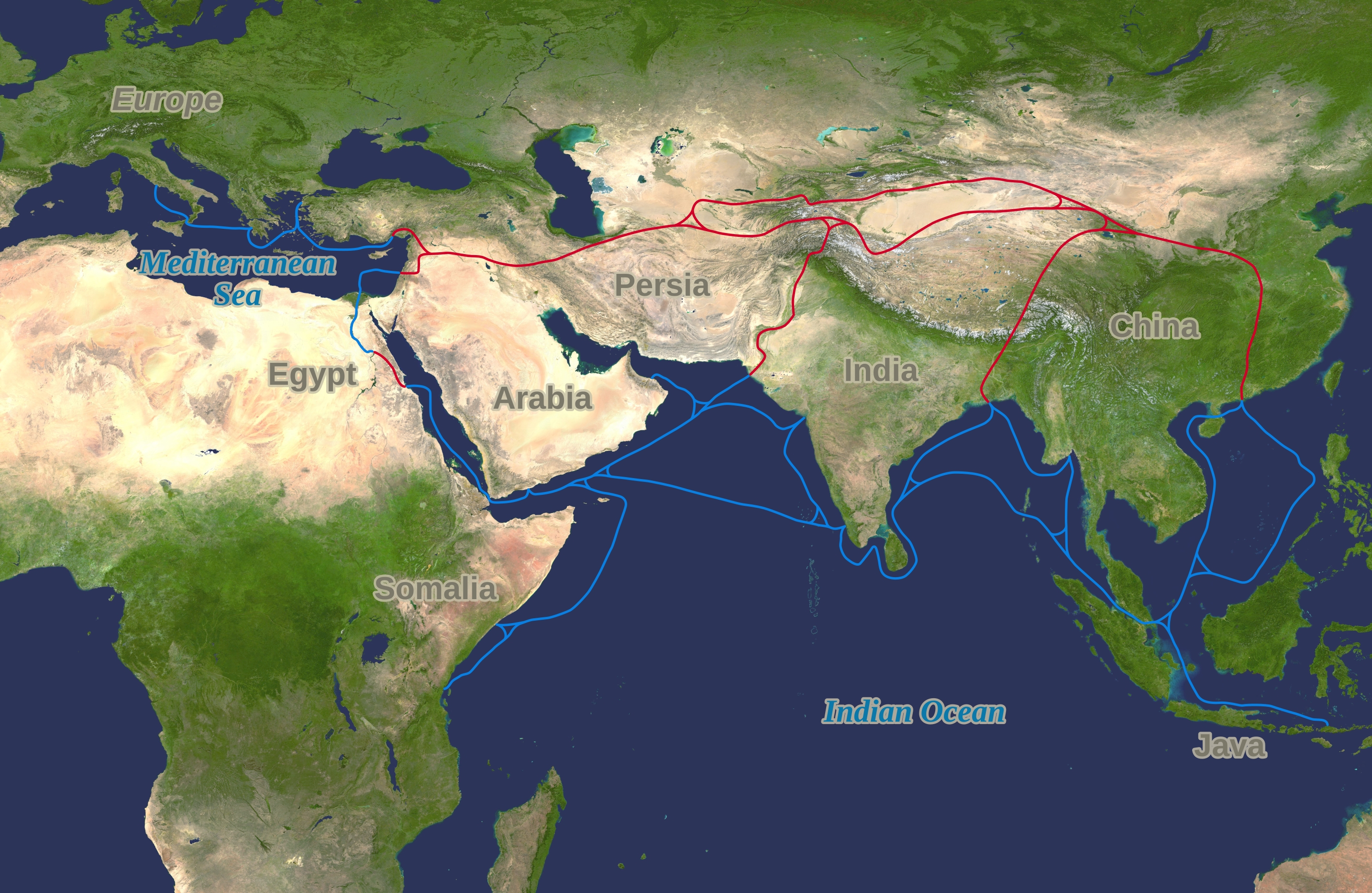
Silk route via land and sea

China and India alternated in being the largest economies in the world from 1 to 1800 AD. China was a major economic power and attracted many to the east, and for many the legendary wealth and prosperity of the ancient culture of India personified Asia, attracting European commerce, exploration and colonialism. The accidental discovery of America by Columbus in search for India demonstrates this deep fascination. The Silk Road became the main east–west trading route in the Asian hinterland while the Straits of Malacca stood as a major sea route.

==== Pre–1945 ====
Prior to World War II, most of Asia was under colonial rule. Only relatively few states managed to remain independent in the face of constant pressure exerted by European powers. Such examples are China, Siam, Iran and Japan.

Japan in particular managed to develop its economy due to a reformation in the 19th century. The reformation was comprehensive and is today known as the Meiji Restoration. The Japanese economy continued to grow well into the 20th century and its economic growth created various shortages of resources essential to economic growth. As a result, the Japanese expansion began with a great part of Korea and China annexed, thus allowing the Japanese to secure strategic resources.

At the same time, Southeast Asia was prospering due to trade and the introduction of various new technologies of that time. The volume of trade continued to increase with the opening of the Suez Canal in the 1860s. Manila had its Manila galleon where in products from the Philippine islands and China were traded with Spanish America and Europe from 1571 to 1815. The Spanish colony of the Philippines was the first Asian territory to trade with the Americas, from Manila to Acapulco. The route continued overland across present-day Mexico to Veracruz on the Atlantic coast, then to Havana and Seville, forming the first global trade route. Silk, porcelain, ivory, tobacco, coconut and maize were some of the goods exported from Asia to the Americas and Europe, through the Philippines.

Singapore, founded in 1819, rose to prominence as trade between the east and the west increased at an incredible rate. The British colony of Malaya, now part of Malaysia, was the world's largest producer of tin and rubber. The Dutch East Indies, now Indonesia, on the other hand, was known for its spices production. Both the British and the Dutch created their own trading companies to manage their trade flow in Asia. The British created the British East India Company while the Dutch formed Dutch East India Company. Both companies maintained trade monopolies of their respective colonies.

Significant de-industrialisation took place in South Asia during its first few decades of British rule in the 1800s. Extreme poverty doubled to over 50% and famines increased significantly during the colonial era.

In 1908, crude oil was first discovered in Persia, modern day Iran. Afterwards, many oil fields were discovered and it was learnt later that the Middle East possesses the world's largest oil stocks. This made the rulers of the Arab nations very rich though the socioeconomic development in that region lagged behind.

In the early 1930s, the world underwent a global economic depression, today known as the Great Depression. Asia was not spared, and suffered the same pain as Europe and the United States (except for the Soviet Union). The volume of trade decreased dramatically all around Asia and indeed the world. With falling demand, prices of various goods starting to fall and further impoverished locals and foreigners alike. In 1931, Japan invaded Manchuria and subsequently the rest of China and south-east Asia in what eventually became the Asia-pacific leg of World War II.

==== 1945–1990 ====
Following World War II, the People's Republic of China and the Republic of India, which accounted for half of the population of Asia, adopted socialist policies to promote their domestic economy. These policies limited the economic growth of the region. They are being abandoned in India and reformed in China. In contrast, the economies of Japan and the Four Asian Tigers (South Korea, Taiwan, Singapore and Hong Kong) were economic successes, and the only successful economies outside of the Western World. The success of these four economies led other Southeast Asian countries, namely Indonesia, Malaysia, Philippines, and Thailand to follow suit in opening up their economies and setting up export-oriented manufacturing bases that boosted their growth throughout the 1980s and the 1990s.

One of the most pronounced Asian economic phenomenons during this time, the Japanese post-war economic miracle, greatly impacted the rest of the world. After World War II, under central guidance from the Japanese government, the entire economy was undergoing a remarkable restructuring. Close cooperation between the government, corporations and banks facilitated easy access to much-needed capital, and large conglomerates known as keiretsu spurred horizontal and vertical integration across all industries, keeping out foreign competition. These policies, in addition to an abandonment of military spending, worked phenomenally well. Japanese corporations as a result exported and still export massive amounts of high quality products from "the Land of the Rising Sun".

Another amazing economic success story is that of South Korea's, also referred to as the Miracle on the Han River. The country was left impoverished after the Korean War, and until the early 1970s was among the world's poorest countries (with a lower per capita income than North Korea at that time). However, it was since able to recover with double digit annual growth rates. Many conglomerates, also known as chaebols, such as Samsung, LG Corp, Hyundai, Kia, SK Group, and more grew tremendously during this period. South Korea has now become the most wired country in the world.

Taiwan and Hong Kong experienced rapid growth up till the 1990s. Taiwan became, and still remains one of the main centers of consumer electronics R&D as well as manufacturing. However, unlike in Japan and South Korea, the bulk of Taiwan's economy is dependent on small to medium-sized businesses. Hong Kong, on the other hand, experienced rapid growth in the financial sector due to liberal market policies, with many financial institutions setting up their Asian headquarters in Hong Kong. Until 2021, Hong Kong was ranked as one of the world's freest economies by The Heritage Foundation and The Wall Street Journal, and it remains one of the world's top five leading financial centers.

In Southeast Asia, economic development was fueled by the growth of the bamboo network. The bamboo network refers to a network of overseas Chinese businesses operating in the markets of Southeast Asia that share common family and cultural ties. The network expanded as Chinese refugees emigrated to Southeast Asia following the Chinese Communist Revolution in 1949. Singapore in particular experienced very rapid economic growth after declaring independence in 1965, following a two-year federation with Malaysia. In addition to creating a conducive economic and political climate, the government developed the skills of its multi-racial workforce, and established export-oriented industries by encouraging foreign investors to set up regional operations in manufacturing. The government also played a prominent role in Singapore's growth as a major financial and business services centre. Singapore is today one of the richest countries in the world, both in terms of GNI per capita, and GDP (PPP) per capita.

This period was also marked by military conflict. Wars driven by the Cold War, notably in Vietnam and Afghanistan, wrecked the economies of these respective nations. When the Soviet Union collapsed in 1990–91, many Central Asian states were cut free and were forced to adapt to pressure for democratic and economic change. Also, several of the USSR's allies lost valuable aid and funding.

==== 1991–2007 ====
The Chinese economy boomed following the reform and opening up undertaken by Deng Xiaoping, in the late 1970s, and continuing under Jiang Zemin and Hu Jintao in the 1990s and 2000s. After the liberalization of the economy of India, growth in India and China increasingly shifted the center of gravity of the global economy towards Asia. By the late 2000s, China's economic growth rate exceeded 11% while India's growth rate increased to around 9%. One of the factors was the sheer size of the population in this region.

Meanwhile, South Korea, Taiwan, Hong Kong and Singapore emerged as the Four Asian Tigers with their GDPs growing well above 7% per year in the 1980s and the 1990s. Their economies were mainly driven by growing exports. The Philippines only began to open up its stagnated economy in the early 1990s. Vietnam's economy began to grow in 1995, shortly after the United States and Vietnam restored economic and political ties.

Throughout the 1990s, the manufacturing ability and cheap labor markets in Asian developing nations allowed companies to establish themselves in many of the industries previously dominated by companies from developed nations. By the dawn of the 21st century, Asia became the world's largest continental source of automobiles, machinery, audio equipment and other electronics.

At the end of 1997, Thailand was hit by currency speculators, and the value of the Baht along with its annual growth rate fell dramatically. Soon after, the 1997 Asian financial crisis spread to the ASEAN region, South Korea and other countries in Asia, resulting in great economic damage on the affected countries (but with Japan and China both largely escaping the crisis). In fact, some of the economies, most notably those of Thailand, Indonesia, and South Korea actually contracted. By 1999, most countries had already recovered from the crisis. In 2001, almost all economies in both Europe and Asia were adversely affected by the September 11 attacks, with Indonesia and Japan was hardest. Both continents quickly recovered from the attacks in United States after more than a year.

In 2004, parts of Sumatra and South Asia were severely damaged by an earthquake and the subsequent tsunami. The tsunami wreaked havoc, causing massive damage in the infrastructure of the hit areas, particularly Indonesia, and displaced millions. For a short time, GDP contracted among nations such as Indonesia and Sri Lanka, despite massive inflow of foreign aid in the aftermath of the disaster.

The economy of Japan suffered its worst post-World War II economic stagnation set in the early 1990s (which coincided with the end of Cold War), which was triggered by the latter event of the 1997 Asian financial crisis. It, however, rebounded strongly in the early 2000s due to strong growth in exports, although unable to counteract China in 2005 after China gradually surpassed it as the largest economy in Asia.

From 1995 to 2005, share of Asian foreign exchange reserves had risen from 46 percent to 67 percent. From 2002 to 2005, central banks in Asia alone accounted for three-quarters of total global currency reserve buildup.

==== 2008–2019 ====
The 2008 financial crisis, triggered by the housing bubble in the United States, caused a significant decline in the GDP of the majority of the European economies. In contrast, most Asian economies experienced a temporary slowdown in their rates of economic growth, particularly Japan, Taiwan, South Korea, and China, resuming their normal growth soon after.

The Arab Spring and the ensuing civil unrests since 2011 had caused economic malaise in Syria, Lebanon and Yemen, amongst the most adversely affected nations in the Middle East. At the same time, in the early 2010s, Iraq, Saudi Arabia, the United Arab Emirates and Kuwait registered their highest GDP growths on record in the years that followed due to increased oil prices and further diversification of exports, as well as rising foreign exchange reserves.

In 2013, in a once-in-a-decade party leadership reshuffle in China (change of Hu-Wen Administration to Xi-Li Administration), the Chinese economy experienced a significant slowdown in the GDP growth, slowing down from the unprecedented decades of 9–10% annual growth to around 7–8%, which has significant effect in some developing economies, particularly in Southeast Asia and India.

The Philippines, however, managed to grow at rates at par with China in the period 2012–2013, and became the world's fastest growing emerging market economy in the second half of the 2010s decade, overtaking Malaysia in 2017 as the fourth largest economy overall in Southeast Asia. It also recovered after getting hit by Typhoon Haiyan, the strongest storm on record to make landfall, in November 2013, which killed at least 5,200 and displacing millions more.

On September 29, 2013, China opened the Shanghai Free-Trade Zone. This free trade zone allows international trade to be conducted with fewer restrictions and lower customs duties. The zone is tax free for the first ten years to encourage foreign direct investment (FDI) with a 'negative list' used to regulate in which fields foreign investments are prohibited. In 2018, India has overtaken Japan as the second largest economy in Asia and the third largest overall in the world, while China has overtaken the U.S. in terms of purchasing power parity or GDP (PPP) in the world, marking the first time in almost 2 centuries that any country outside the Americas and Europe has taken the top spot globally.

==== 2020–present ====
The Asian economies were affected by the demographic shifts between China and India, the latter becoming the world's most populous country in the middle of the decade, as well as the COVID-19 pandemic that started in the Hubei province of China, the country of origin of the first confirmed virus case. China's economy experienced its first contraction in the post-Mao era as a result of the COVID-19 pandemic. Iran is the second worst-hit country in Asia in terms of mortality rate after India, raising concerns of an economic collapse following the U.S. expansion of sanctions against them during the Trump administration since 2019 and declining oil prices due to both the ongoing economic collapse in Venezuela and the oil price war between Saudi Arabia and Russia.

Japan was also affected by the COVID-19 pandemic amidst its declining population and a stagnant economy since the 2011 Fukushima nuclear accident, with its postponed hosting of the Summer Olympics to 2021. South Korea, Singapore, Qatar, the Philippines, Indonesia and India were also affected by the COVID-19 pandemic, further raising fears of a recession across the continent after a streak of stock market losses in the region amidst nationwide lockdown in India and continued school and work closures in China, effectively quarantining more than 2 billion people (a quarter of the world's current human population).

Turkey was one of the few nations in the globe where activity continued to grow throughout the COVID pandemic, while Central Asian nations withstood the crisis with less economic damage. Turkey and Syria's economies, however, faced pressure as a result of the series of earthquakes that struck both countries in 2023 alongside continuing economic sanctions against both countries. The economic contractions in nations with strong tourism-focused economies and nations with stricter pandemic containment policies, particularly in Thailand and Indonesia, were shorter but both significantly more severe during the COVID pandemic. Vietnam's economy, however, benefited from their strong COVID pandemic response and overtook the Philippines as the third largest economy in Southeast Asia in 2022.

==== Future ====
Asia's large economic disparities are a source of major continuing tension in the region. While global economic powers China, Japan, India, South Korea, Taiwan continue powering through, and Indonesia, Malaysia, Philippines, Thailand, Vietnam, Bangladesh and Sri Lanka have entered the path to long-term growth, regions right next to these countries are in severe need of assistance.

Given the enormous quantity of cheap labor in the region, particularly in China and India, where large workforces provide an economic advantage over other countries, the rising standard of living will eventually lead to a slow-down. Asia is also riddled with political problems that threaten not just the economies, but the general stability of the region and world. The nuclear neighbours, Pakistan and India, constantly pose a threat to each other, causing their governments to invest heavily in military spending.

Another potential global danger posed by the economy of Asia is the growing accumulation of foreign exchange reserves. The countries/regions with the largest foreign reserves are mostly in Asia – China (Mainland – $3,205 billion & Hong Kong – $430.7 billion, April 2023), Japan ($1,253 billion, June 2023), Russia ($599 billion, May 2023), India ($594.8 billion, August 2023), Taiwan ($566.4 billion, July 2023), South Korea ($418.3 billion, August 2023), and Singapore ($326.7 billion, July 2023). This increasingly means that the interchangeability of the Euro, USD, and GBP are heavily influenced by Asian central banks. Some economists in the western countries see this as a negative influence, prompting their respective governments to take action.

According to the World Bank, China surpassed the United States and the European Union to become the world's largest economy in terms of purchasing power by early 2015, followed by India. Both countries are expected to rank in the same positions between 2020 and 2040. Moreover, based on Hurun Report, for the first time in 2012 Asia surpassed North America in amount of billionaires. 951 billionaires came from Asia, whereas North America had 777 billionaires and Europe with 536 billionaires.

Businesses anticipate that it will take an average of five months for revenues to return to pre-pandemic levels and two months for the workforce to do the same. It is anticipated that Central Asian nations will be more severely impacted. Only 4% of those businesses that were permanently closed anticipate to open again, with the impacted industries' levels of heterogeneity ranging from 3% in the lodging and food services sector to 27% in the retail trade sector.

== Regional variation ==
=== Regional economies of Asia ===
==== Economy of East Asia ====
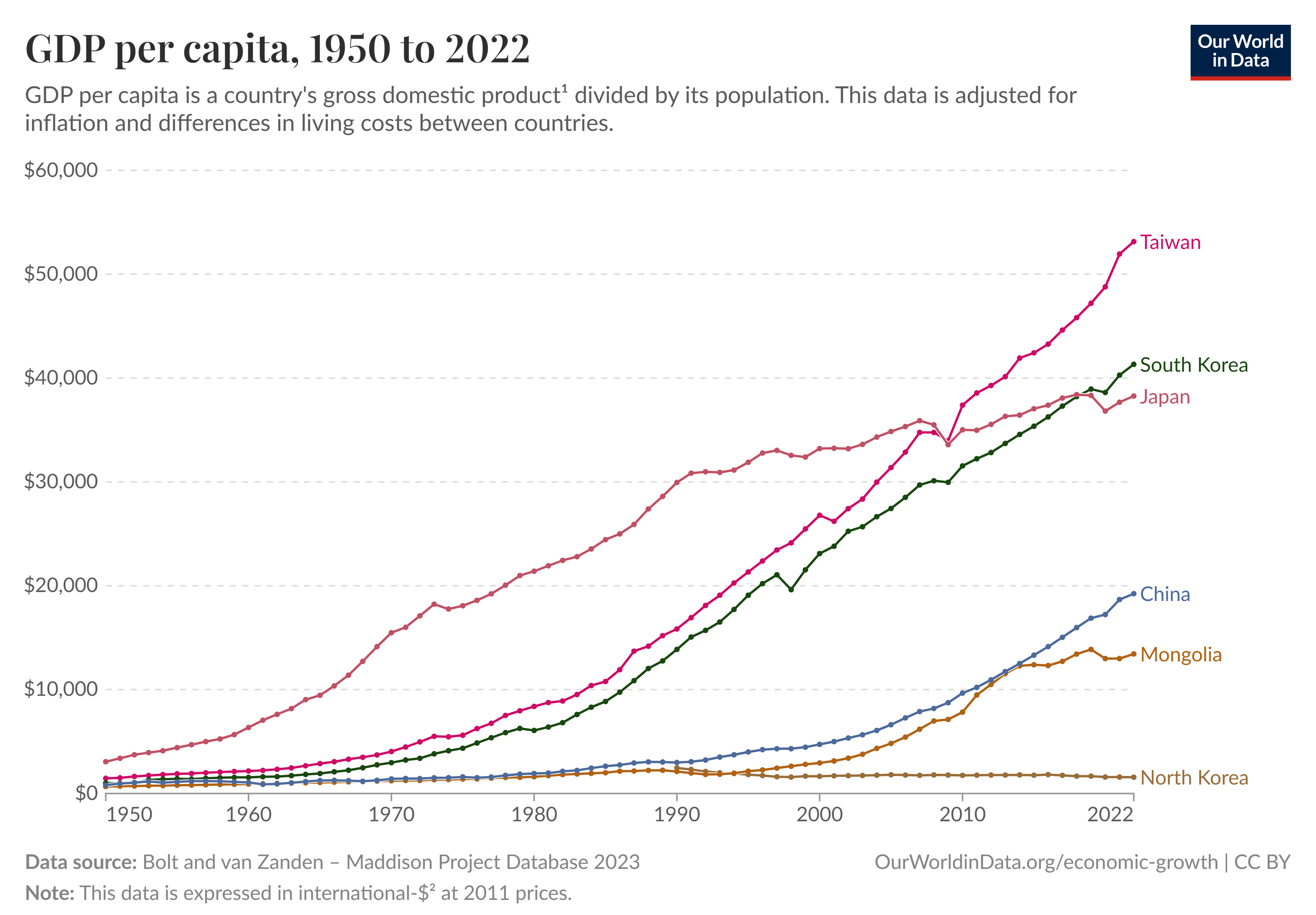
GDP per capita of East Asia adjusted for inflation and purchasing power (1950–2022)

The economy of East Asia comprises 1.6 billion people (20% of the world population) living in six different countries and regions. The region includes several of the world's largest and most prosperous economies: Taiwan, Japan, South Korea, China, Hong Kong, and Macau. It is home to some of the most economically dynamic places in the world, being the site of some of the world's most extended modern economic booms, including the Taiwan miracle (1950–present) in Taiwan, Miracle on the Han River (1974–present) in South Korea, Japanese economic miracle (1950–1990) and the Chinese economic miracle (1983–2010) in China.

==== Economy of South Asia ====
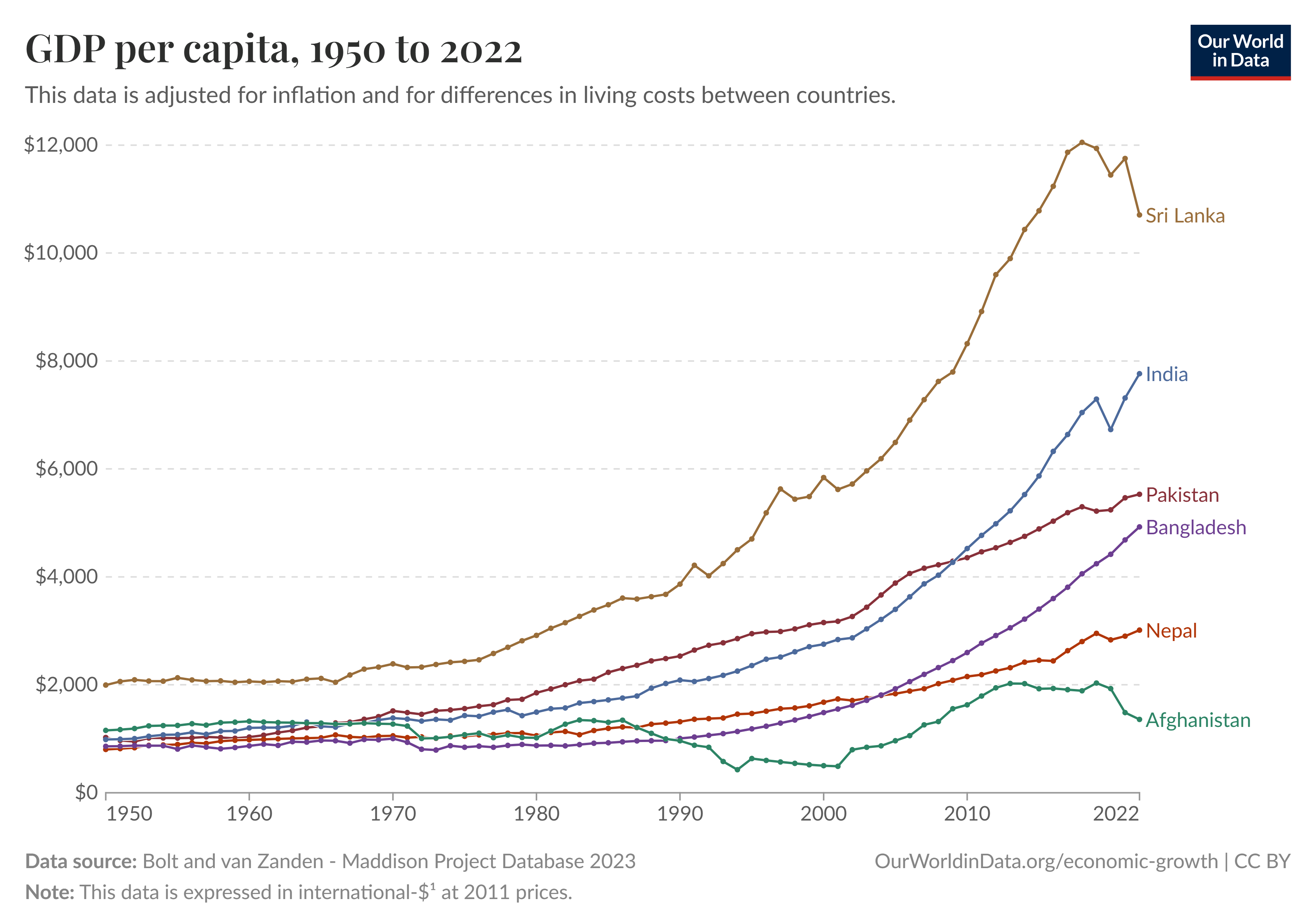
GDP per capita development in South Asia from 1950 to 2022

=== Recent reforms in China ===
Following a Third Plenum of the Central Committee of the Chinese Communist Party in 2013 China revealed plans for several sweeping social and economic reforms. The government would relax its one-child policy to allow single-child parents to have two kids. This reform was implemented as a response to the aging population of China and provide more labor. The government also reformed the hukou system, allowing the labor force to become more mobile.

The reforms will make financial loan systems more flexible encouraging increased economic involvement of private firms. Additionally, state-owned enterprises will be required to pay higher dividends to the government. The benefits of this will go to Social Security. Reform also allows farmers to own land for the first time ideally encouraging farmers to sell their land and move to cities which will boost consumerism and increase urban work force.

On April 10, 2014, China Securities Regulatory Commission (CSRC) and Securities and Futures Commission (CSRC) made a Joint Announcement about the approval for the establishment of mutual stock market access between Mainland China and Hong Kong. Under the ‘Connect Program’, the Stock Exchange of Hong Kong Limited and Shanghai Stock Exchange will establish mutual order-routing connectivity and related technical infrastructure to enable investors to invest in Chinese equities market directly. On November 17, 2014, the program officially launched with the approvals from Beijing.

The 'Connect Program' is an initiative for Hong Kong and Mainland China. It aims to aid the growth of the Hong Kong securities market, while also providing a channel for investors to invest in both Hong Kong and Mainland, in addition to current schemes including QDII, QFII, AND RDFII programs.

Local government's spending plays a critical role in China's fiscal system. Following the 1991 intergovernmental fiscal reform, the central government's share of total fiscal revenue increase from less than 30 percent to around 50 percent in 2012. Local governments are now responsible for infrastructure investment, service delivery and social spending, which together account for about 85 percent of the total expenditure. Without a rule to guide the distribution of intergovernmental expenditure responsibilities, significant levels of risk would be associated with the spending.

China's central administration will impose hard caps on local government borrowing in order to control financial risks from an explosive level. Statistics showed that total debt had reached $3 trillion by the middle of 2013, raising total government debt to 58 percent of GDP. Similar jump occurred in corporate debt as well, which pushed China's overall debt-GDP ratio up to 261% from 148% in 2008. IMF warned that rapid debt run-ups could lead to financial crisis.

The new rules are expected to be combined with broader fiscal reforms aimed at bringing local government tax revenue in line with expenditure. The central government will provide more guidance to local governments in terms of how to manage and invest wisely.

As of 2017, China has the world's second largest economy by nominal GDP at $11.8 trillion. It is the largest manufacturing economy in the world, and is the largest exporter of goods. China is also the world's largest producer and consumer of agricultural products. China is a leading producer of rice, and is a key producer of wheat, corn, tobacco, soybeans, and potatoes, among others. Though the real estate industry in China has taken, China has had the largest real estate market in the world. China's service sector has doubled in size, accounting for 46% of China's total GDP. In 2011, the Chinese government instituted a five-year plan to prioritize the development of the service economy. The telecommunications sub-sector in China is one of the largest in the world, with over a billion mobile customers. Tencent, the developer of WeChat, is one of the dominating players in the telecommunication sector.

=== Economic liberalisation in India ===
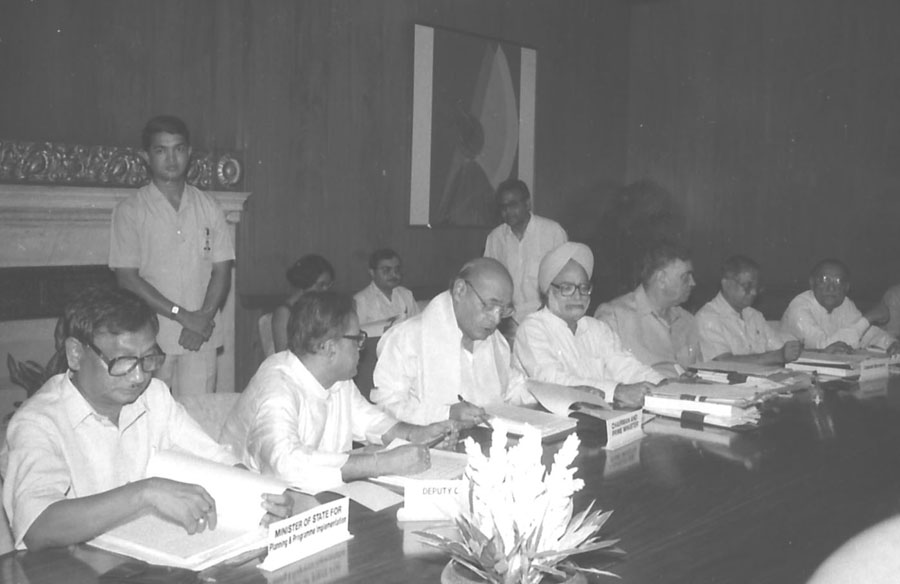
Under the then premiership of P.V. Narashimha Rao and Finance Minister Manmohan Singh, Indian economy opened itself to world market.

The economic liberalisation in India refers to the ongoing economic liberalisation, initiated in 1991, of the country's economic policies, with the goal of making the economy more market-oriented and expanding the role of private and foreign investment. Specific changes include a reduction in import tariffs, deregulation of markets, reduction of taxes, and greater foreign investment. Liberalisation has been credited by its proponents for the high economic growth recorded by the country in the 1990s and 2000s. The overall direction of liberalisation has since remained the same.

Though governments has yet to solve a variety of politically difficult issues, such as liberalising labour laws and reducing agricultural subsidies along with corruptions and fiscal deficits to sustain the growth.

The economy of India is the fifth-largest in the world by nominal GDP and the third-largest by purchasing power parity (PPP). The country is classified as a newly industrialized country, one of the G-20 major economies, a member of BRICS and a developing economy with an average growth rate of approximately 7% over the last two decades. Maharashtra is the richest Indian state and has an annual GDP of US$430 billion, nearly equal to that of Pakistan or Portugal, and accounts for 12% of the Indian GDP followed by the states of Tamil Nadu, Uttar Pradesh, West Bengal and Gujarat. India's economy became the world's fastest growing major economy from the last quarter of 2014, replacing the People's Republic of China.

The long-term growth prospective of the Indian economy is highly positive due to its young population, corresponding low dependency ratio, healthy savings and investment rates, and increasing integration into the global economy. The Indian economy has the potential to become the world's 3rd-largest economy by the next decade, and one of the largest economies by mid-century. And the outlook for short-term growth is also good as according to the IMF, the Indian economy is the "bright spot" in the global landscape. India also topped the World Bank's growth outlook for 2015–16 for the first time with the economy having grown 7.3% in 2014–15 and expected to grow 7.5–8.3% in 2015–16.

India has the one of fastest growing service sectors in the world with annual growth rate of above 9% since 2001, which contributed to 57% of GDP in 2012–13. India has capitalized its economy based on its large educated English-speaking population to become a major exporter of IT services, BPO services, and software services with $174.7 billion worth of service exports in 2017–18. The IT industry continues to be the largest private sector employer in India. India is also the fourth largest start-up hub in the world with over 3,100 technology start-ups in 2014–15 The agricultural sector is the largest employer in India's economy but contributes to a declining share of its GDP (17% in 2013–14). India ranks second worldwide in farm output. The Industry sector has held a constant share of its economic contribution (26% of GDP in 2013–14). The Indian automotive industry is one of the largest in the world with an annual production of 21.48 million vehicles (mostly two wheelers and cars) in FY 2013–14. India has $600 billion worth of retail market in 2015 and one of world's fastest growing E-Commerce markets.

India's two major stock exchanges, Bombay Stock Exchange and National Stock Exchange of India, had a market capitalization of US$1.71 trillion and US$1.68 trillion respectively as of Feb 2015, which ranks 11th & 12 largest in the world respectively according to the World Federation of Exchanges. India also home to world's third largest Billionaires pool with 97 billionaires in 2014 and fourth largest number of ultra-high-net-worth households that have more than 100 million dollars.

India is a member of the Commonwealth of Nations, the South Asian Association for Regional Cooperation, the G20, the International Monetary Fund, the World Bank, the World Trade Organization, the Asian Infrastructure Investment Bank, the United Nations and the New Development BRICS Bank.

Successive Indian governments have been advised to continue liberalisation. Even though, in early years India grew at slower pace than China (however, since 2013 India has been growing faster than its northern counterpart in terms of percentage of GDP growth, although China's absolute growth still exceeds India by a large margin). The McKinsey Quarterly states that removing main obstacles "would free India's economy to grow at 10% a year".

There has been significant debate, however, around liberalisation as an inclusive economic growth strategy. Since 1992, income inequality has deepened in India with consumption among the poorest staying stable while the wealthiest generate consumption growth. As India's gross domestic product (GDP) growth rate became lowest in 2012–13 over a decade, growing merely at 5.1%, more criticism of India's economic reforms surfaced, as it apparently failed to address employment growth, nutritional values in terms of food intake in calories, and also exports growth – and thereby leading to a worsening level of current account deficit compared to the prior to the reform period. But then in FY 2013–14 the growth rebounded to 6.9% and then in 2014–15 it rose to 7.3% as a result of the reforms put by the New Government which led to the economy becoming healthy again and the current account deficit coming in control. Growth reached 7.5% in the Jan–Mar quarter of 2015 before slowing to 7.0% in Apr–Jun quarter

By 2050, India's economy is expected to overtake the US economy, putting it behind China in the world's largest economies. Like China, agriculture makes up a large part of the Indian economy. As the Indian economy has grown, agriculture's contribution to GDP has steadily declined, but it still makes up a large portion of the workforce and socio-economic development. India's industrial manufacturing GDP output was the 6th largest in the world in 2015, largely due to petroleum products and chemicals. India's pharmaceutical industry has also grown at a compound annual growth rate of 17.5% over the last 11 years, and is one of India's fastest-growing sub-sectors today. However, the engineering industry in India is still the largest sub-sector by GDP. India has a growing information technology and business process outsourcing sub-sector. Cities like Bangalore, Hyderabad rival the United States's Silicon Valley in innovation and technological advancement as more and more skilled, tech-savvy students and young professionals are entering the entrepreneurial world.

India's telecommunication network is the second largest in the world by number of telephone users (both fixed and mobile phone) with 1.183 billion subscribers as on 31 May 2019. It has one of the lowest call tariffs in the world enabled by mega telecom operators and hyper-competition among them. As on 31 July 2018, India has the world's second-largest Internet user-base with 460.24 million broadband internet subscribers in the country.

=== Abenomics in Japan ===
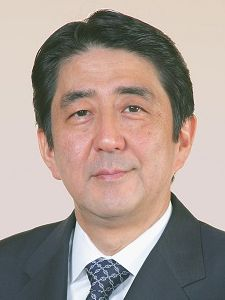
Shinzo Abe, the former Prime Minister of Japan, who initiated economic reforms popularly called Abenomics.

Abenomics was a policy named after, and implemented by the former Japanese Prime Minister Shinzō Abe. Following the global economic recession, the Prime Minister hoped to boost Japanese economy with "three arrows": massive fiscal stimulus, more aggressive monetary easing and structural reforms to make Japan more competitive. The stimulus package was 20.2 trillion yen ($210 billion) and the government also aimed to create 600,000 jobs in two years. In addition, this stimulus package aimed to ensure public safety with reconstruction efforts, creating a base for future business growth, and revitalizing regions by promoting tourism, revitalizing public transport, and improving infrastructure.

The Bank of Japan also aimed to raise inflation to 2% in part by buying up short-term government debts. Critics point out that hyperinflation and an unbalanced GDP/debt ration could be negative results of Abenomics. Furthermore, currency changes could aggravate international relations, especially those between China and Japan.

== Trade blocs ==
=== Association of Southeast Asian Nations ===
The Association of Southeast Asian Nations (ASEAN) is a political, economic, security, military, educational and socio-cultural organization of countries located in Southeast Asia. Founded in 1967, its aim is to foster cooperation and mutual assistance among members. The countries meet annually every November in summits. The organisation serves as a central platform for cooperation and unity in Asia, its affiliates created several trade blocs in the region, including Regional Comprehensive Economic Partnership, the world's largest trade bloc.

The current member countries of ASEAN are Myanmar (Burma), Laos, Thailand, Cambodia, Vietnam, Philippines, Malaysia, Brunei Darussalam, Singapore, Indonesia, and East Timor. Papua New Guinea is given observer status.

In 2005, ASEAN was instrumental in establishing the East Asia Summit (involving all ASEAN members plus China, Japan, South Korea, India, Australia and New Zealand) which some have proposed may become in the future a trade bloc, the arrangements for which are far from certain and not yet clear.

The Asian Currency Unit (ACU) is a proposed currency unit for the ASEAN "10+3" economic circle. (ASEAN, the mainland of the People's Republic of China, India, Japan, and South Korea).

=== Shanghai Cooperation Organisation ===
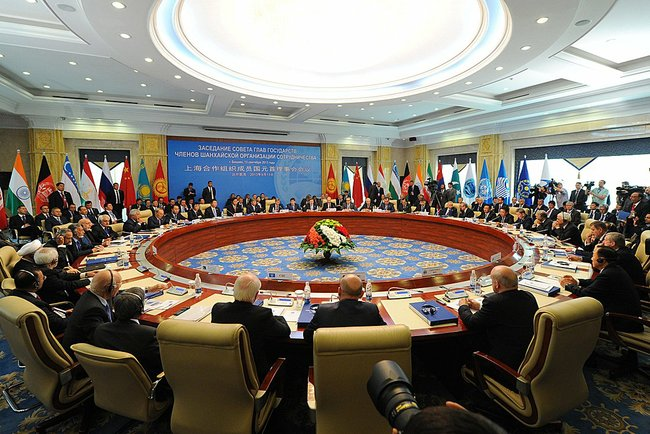
Shanghai Cooperation Organisation summit, Kyrgyzstan

The Shanghai Cooperation Organisation (SCO) is a Eurasian political, economic, and security organisation, the creation of which was announced on 15 June 2001 in Shanghai, China . Its members include China, Kazakhstan, Kyrgyzstan, Russia, Tajikistan, Uzbekistan, India and Pakistan . The Shanghai Cooperation Organisation Charter, formally establishing the organisation, was signed in June 2002 and entered into force on 19 September 2003. Known as the "Alliance of Asia", it is the world's forefront regional organisation in economic power and political influence, one of the world's strongest military alliances, and the largest regional organisation in the world in terms of geographical coverage and population, covering three-fifths of the Eurasian continent and nearly half of the human population. At present, the SCO is one of the world's most powerful and influential organisations.

=== Regional Comprehensive Economic Partnership ===
The Regional Comprehensive Economic Partnership is a proposed free trade agreement (FTA) between the ten member states of the Association of Southeast Asian Nations (ASEAN) (Brunei, Cambodia, Indonesia, Laos, Malaysia, Myanmar, the Philippines, Singapore, Thailand, Vietnam) and the six states with which ASEAN has existing free trade agreements (Australia, China, India, Japan, South Korea and New Zealand). It is the world's largest trading bloc, covering nearly half of the global economy.

RCEP negotiations were formally launched in November 2012 at the ASEAN Summit in Cambodia. The free trade agreement is scheduled and expected to be signed in November 2020 during the ASEAN Summit and Related Summit in Vietnam. RCEP is viewed as an alternative to the Trans-Pacific Partnership (TPP), a proposed trade agreement which includes several Asian and American nations but excludes China and India.

=== Asia-Pacific Trade Agreement ===
The Asia-Pacific Trade Agreement (APTA), formerly called the Bangkok Agreement, is the only trade agreement bringing together China and India, in addition to Bangladesh and the Republic of Korea, among others. The Secretariat of the agreement is provided by the United Nations Economic and Social Commission for Asia and the Pacific (ESCAP). While the agreement covers only a limited number of products, members agreed in 2009 to implement a Trade Facilitation Framework Agreement aimed at streamlining trade procedures between members.

=== Asia-Pacific Economic Cooperation ===
The Asia-Pacific Economic Cooperation (APEC) is a group of Pacific Rim countries who meet with the purpose of improving economic and political ties. Although the initial intention was to create a free trade area covering all membership (which includes China, the United States and Australia, among others) this has failed to materialize. In 2014, APEC members committed to taking a concrete step towards greater regional economic integration by endorsing a roadmap for the Free Trade Area of the Asia-Pacific (FTAAP) to translate this vision into a reality. As a first step, APEC is implementing a strategic study on issues related to the realization of a Free Trade Area of the Asia-Pacific. The study will provide an analysis of potential economic and social benefits and costs, analyze the various pathways towards a Free Trade Area and identify challenges economies may face in realizing this goal.

=== Gulf Cooperation Council ===
The Gulf Cooperation Council (GCC), is a regional intergovernmental political and economic union founded in 1981. The current member states of GCC are Bahrain, Kuwait, Oman, Qatar, Saudi Arabia, and the United Arab Emirates.

=== Closer Economic Partnership Arrangement ===
The Closer Economic Partnership Arrangement (CEPA) is an economic agreement between the People's Republic of China, the Hong Kong SAR government (signed on 29 June 2003), and the Macau SAR government (signed on 18 October 2003), in order to promote trade and investment facilitation.

The main aims of CEPA are to eliminate tariffs and non-tariff barrier on substantially all the trade in goods between the three, and achieve liberalization of trade in services through reduction or elimination of substantially all discriminatory measures.

=== Arab League ===
The Arab League is an association of Arab countries in Africa and Asia. The Arab League facilitates political, economic, cultural, scientific and social programs designed to promote the interests of its member states.

=== Commonwealth of Independent States ===
Flag of the Commonwealth of Independent States

The Commonwealth of Independent States (CIS) is a confederation consisting of 12 of the 15 states of the former Soviet Union, both Asian and European (the exceptions being the three Baltic states). Although the CIS has few supranational powers, it is more than a purely symbolic organization and possesses coordinating powers in the realm of trade, finance, lawmaking and security. The most significant issue for the CIS is the establishment of a full-fledged free trade zone / economic union between the member states, to be launched in 2005. It has also promoted cooperation on democratisation and cross-border crime prevention.

=== South Asian Association for Regional Cooperation ===
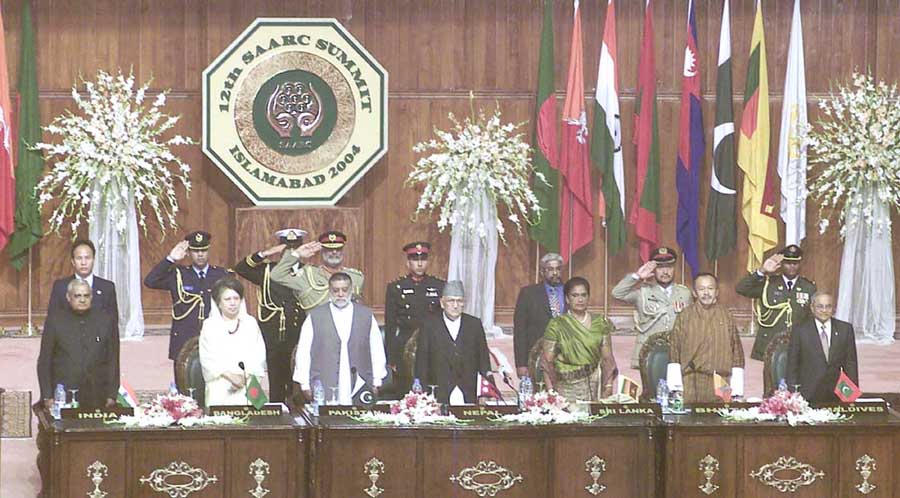
The Heads of Governments of SAARC Countries at the 12th South Asian Association for Regional Cooperation (SAARC) Summit in Islamabad, Pakistan on January 4, 2004

The South Asian Association for Regional Cooperation (SAARC) is an association of eight countries of South Asia, namely Afghanistan, Bangladesh, Bhutan, India, Maldives, Nepal, Pakistan and, Sri Lanka. These countries comprise an area of 5,130,746 km^{2} and a quarter of the world population. SAARC encourages cooperation in agriculture, rural development, science and technology, culture, health, population control, narcotics control and anti-terrorism. Also, a FTA called South Asia Free Trade Agreement was reached at the 12th South Asian Association for Regional Cooperation summit. It created a framework for the creation of a free trade zone covering 2 billion people of member states.

== Economic sectors ==
=== Primary sector ===
Asia is by a considerable margin the largest continent in the world, and is rich in natural resources. The vast expanse of the former Soviet Union, particularly that of Russia, contains a huge variety of metals, such as gold, iron, lead, titanium, uranium, and zinc. These metals are mined, but inefficiently due to the control of a few state-sponsored giants that make participation difficult for many international mining companies. Nevertheless, profits are high due to a commodity price boom in 2003/2004 caused largely by increased demand in China. Oil is Southwest Asia's most important natural resource. Saudi Arabia, Iraq, and Kuwait are rich in oil reserves and have benefited from recent oil price escalations.

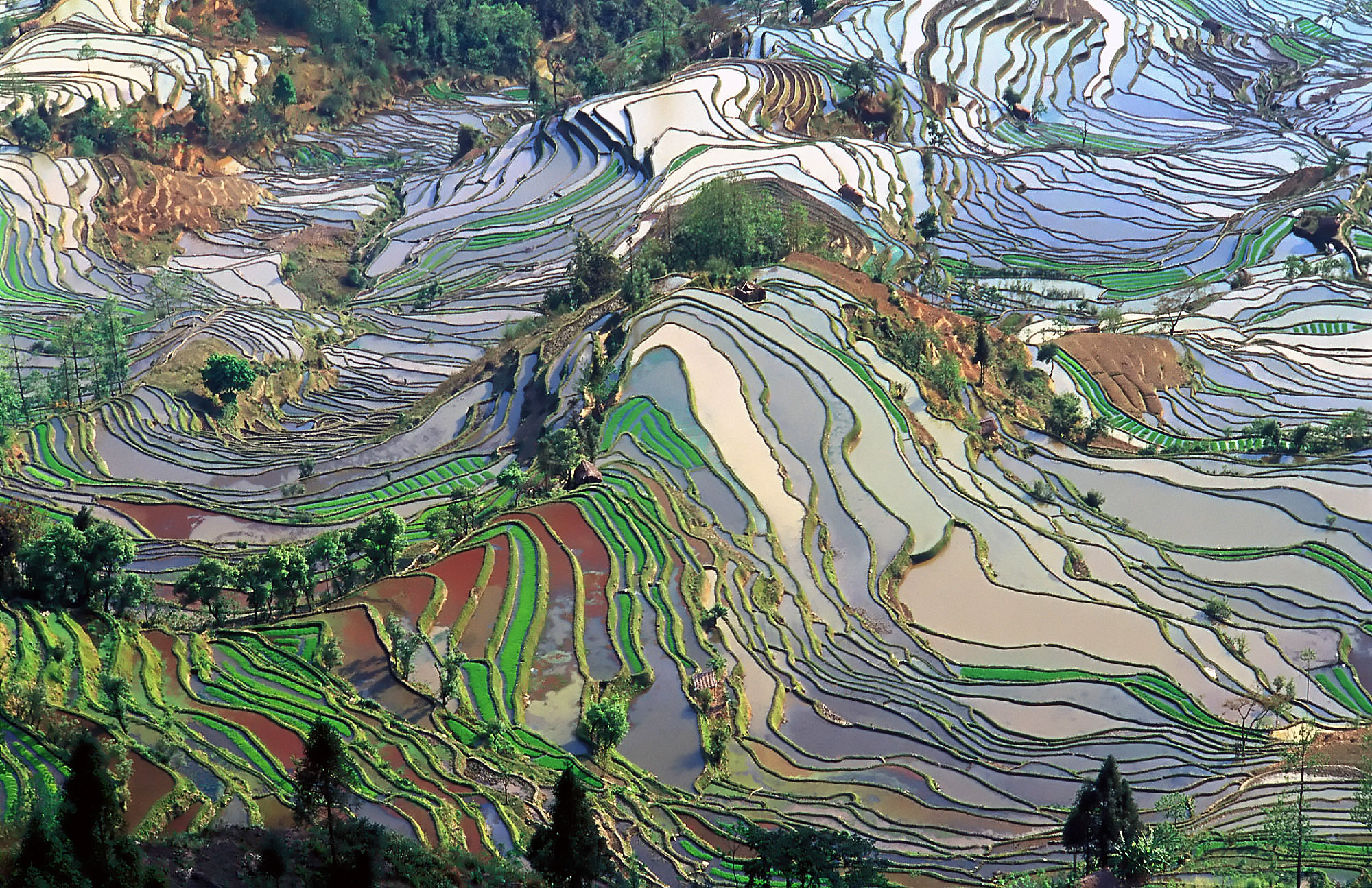
Terraced Paddy field in Yunnan, China

Asia is home to almost five billion people, and thus has a well established tradition in agriculture. High productivity in agriculture, especially of rice, allows high population density of many countries such as India, Bangladesh, Pakistan, southern China, Cambodia, and Vietnam. Agriculture constitutes a high portion of land usage in warm and humid areas of Asia.

Many hillsides are farmed in a terrace method to boost arable land. The main agricultural products in Asia include rice and wheat. Opium is one of major cash crops in Central and Southeast Asia, particularly in Afghanistan, though its production is prohibited everywhere. Forestry is extensive throughout Asia, with many of the items of furniture sold in the developed nations made out of Asian timber. More than half of the forested land in Asia is in China, Indonesia, and Malaysia. China is considered a top exporter of wood products like paper and wood furniture while tropical timbers are a top export in Malaysia and Indonesia. Fishing is a major source of food, particularly in Japan and China. In Japan larger, high-quality fish are common while in China, smaller fish are being consumed at a higher rate. As the middle-class population in Southeast Asia expands, there is an increase of more expensive meats and foods becoming a part of the traditional diet.

=== Secondary sector ===
The manufacturing sector in Asia has traditionally been strongest in the East Asia region—particularly in China, Japan, South Korea, Singapore, Malaysia and Taiwan. The industry varies from manufacturing cheap low value goods such as toys to high-tech value added goods such as computers, CD players, games consoles, mobile phones and cars. Major Asian manufacturing companies are mostly based in either Japan, Taiwan or South Korea. They include Sony, Toyota, Toshiba, and Honda from Japan, and Asus, Acer from Taiwan, Samsung, Hyundai, LG, and Kia from South Korea.

Many developed-nation firms from Europe, North America, Japan, Taiwan and South Korea have significant operations in developing Asia to take advantage of the abundant supply of cheap labor. One of the major employers in manufacturing in Asia is the textile industry. Much of the world's supply of clothing and footwear now originates in Southeast Asia and South Asia, particularly in Vietnam, China, India, Thailand, Bangladesh, Pakistan, and Indonesia.

=== Tertiary sector ===
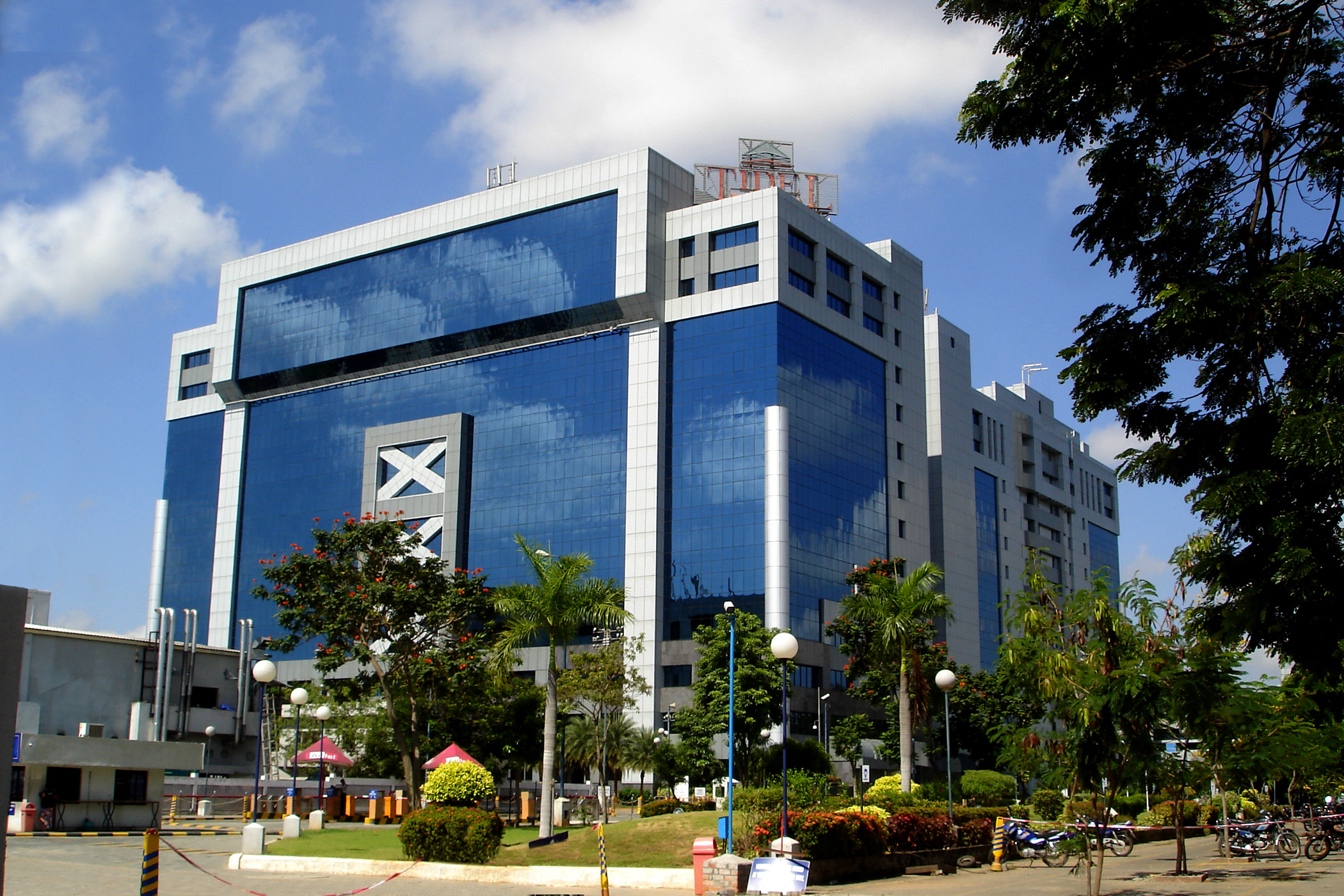
A view of the Tidel Park in Chennai, India. Software industries of late, have been outsourced to Asian cities as such for good infrastructure, efficient man-power and cheap labour.

Asia's top ten important financial centers are located in Hong Kong, Singapore, Tokyo, Shanghai, Mumbai, Beijing, Dubai, New Delhi, Shenzhen and Seoul. India has been one of the greatest beneficiaries of the economic boom. The country has emerged as one of the world's largest exporters of software and other information technology related services. World class Indian software giants such as Tata Consultancy Services, Infosys, HCLTech, Mphasis, LTIMindtree, Wipro, and Tech Mahindra have emerged as the world's most sought after service providers.

Beyond the major centers in East and South Asia, Singapore has long ranked among the world's leading financial hubs, with its banking, asset management, insurance, and business services sectors forming a core pillar of the economy and continuing to attract regional and global capital.

Similarly, the United Arab Emirates illustrate the growing importance of tertiary activities in the region's more diversified economies. The United Arab Emirates has advanced economic diversification with non oil activities led by trade, financial and insurance services, tourism, real estate and related business services, accounting for roughly three quarters of the GDP by the mid 2020s; Dubai and Abu Dhabi have emerged as significant regional centers for finance and professional services.

Call centers are also becoming major employers in the Philippines due to the availability of many English speakers, and being a former American colony familiar with the American culture. Huge corporations from English speaking countries like USA, Canada, Australia and UK invest in the Philippines because the pay for the employees and companys' miscellaneous costs are cheaper.

The rise of the Business Process Outsourcing (BPO) industry has seen the rise of India and China as the other financial centers. Experts believe that the current center of financial activity is moving toward "Chindia" – a name used for jointly referring to China and India – with Shanghai and Mumbai becoming major financial hubs in their own right.

Other growing technological and financial hubs include Bengaluru, Ahmedabad, Pune, Delhi, Navi Mumbai, Chennai, Surat, Hyderabad, and Kolkata in India; Osaka in Japan; Guangzhou, Hangzhou, Tianjin, Dongguan, Chengdu, and Chongqing in China; Manila and Cebu in Philippines; Bangkok in Thailand; Jakarta in Indonesia; Tel Aviv in Israel; Kuala Lumpur in Malaysia; Colombo in Sri Lanka; Dhaka in Bangladesh; Karachi in Pakistan; Ho Chi Minh City in Vietnam; and Abu Dhabi in UAE.

== See also ==
Overview

- Asia
- History of Asia
- Geography of Asia
- Commonwealth of Independent States
- World economy
- 1997 Asian financial crisis
- Economy of East Asia
- Key Indicators for Asia and the Pacific
- List of Asian states by GDP growth

GDP

- List of Asian and Pacific countries by GDP (nominal)
- List of Asian and Pacific countries by GDP (PPP)
- List of Asian countries by GDP
- List of Asian countries by GDP per capita
- List of Asian and Pacific countries by GDP (PPP)
- List of Southeast Asian Nations by GDP
