= Historic GDP Estimates for South Asia =

== GDP (PPP) estimates for the South Asian region ==
GDP (PPP) in 1990 international dollars
| Year | GDP (PPP) (1990 dollars) | GDP per capita (1990 dollars) | | | | | Avg % GDP growth | % of world GDP (PPP) | Population | % of world population | Period |
|---|---|---|---|---|---|---|---|---|---|---|---|
| 1 | 33,750,000,000 | 450 | | | | | — | 32.0 | 75,000,000 | 33.0 | Classical era |
| 1000 | 33,750,000,000 | 450 | | | | | 0.0 | 28.0 | 75,000,000 | 28.0 | Early medieval era |
| 1500 | 60,500,000,000 | 550 | | | | | 0.117 | 24.35 | 110,000,000 | 25.0 | Late medieval era |
| Alternative estimates: | | | | | | | | | | | |
| 1600 | 74,250,000,000 | 550 | 782 | 682 | 758 | 735 | 0.205 | 22.39 | 135,000,000 | 24.27 | Early modern era |
| 1700 | 90,750,000,000 | 550 | 719 | 622 | 697 | 676 | 0.201 | 24.43 | 165,000,000 | 27.36 | Early modern era |
| 1820 | 111,417,000,000 | 533 | 580 | 520 | 562 | 545 | 0.171 | 16.04 | 209,000,000 | 20.06 | Early modern era |
| 1870 | 134,882,000,000 | 533 | 526 | 526 | 510 | 494 | 0.975 | 12.14 | 253,000,000 | 19.83 | Colonial era |
| 1913 | 204,242,000,000 | 673 | | | | 624 | 0.965 | 7.47 | 303,700,000 | 16.64 | Colonial era |
| 1940 | 265,455,000,000 | 696 | | | | 636 | 0.976 | 5.9 | 386,800,000 | 16.82 | Colonial era |

== South Asia relative to the British economy ==
GDP at market prices
| Year | Gross domestic product (000,000 rupees) | ₹ per GBP | GDP deflator (index 2011 = 100) | Per capita income (as % of UK) |
|---|---|---|---|---|
| 1687 | 7,004 | 14.94 | 0.117 | |
| 1688 | 7,019 | 14.94 | 0.117 | |
| 1689 | 7,072 | 15.02 | 0.117 | |
| 1690 | 7,087 | 15.02 | 0.117 | |
| 1691 | 7,083 | 14.98 | 0.117 | |
| 1692 | 7,070 | 14.92 | 0.117 | |
| 1693 | 7,042 | 14.83 | 0.116 | |
| 1694 | 7,076 | 14.87 | 0.116 | |
| 1695 | 7,163 | 15.02 | 0.117 | |
| 1696 | 7,877 | 15.00 | 0.129 | |
| 1697 | 7,998 | 15.20 | 0.130 | |
| 1698 | 7,947 | 15.07 | 0.129 | |
| 1699 | 7,717 | 14.94 | 0.125 | |
| 1700 | 7,666 | 14.81 | 0.124 | 35.17 |
| 1701 | 7,834 | 15.07 | 0.126 | 34.09 |
| 1702 | 8,101 | 15.52 | 0.130 | 35.28 |
| 1703 | 7,952 | 15.17 | 0.127 | 38.36 |
| 1704 | 8,011 | 15.22 | 0.128 | 31.78 |
| 1705 | 7,986 | 15.11 | 0.127 | 34.20 |
| 1706 | 8,104 | 15.27 | 0.128 | 41.67 |
| 1707 | 8,228 | 15.44 | 0.129 | 37.83 |
| 1708 | 8,245 | 15.41 | 0.129 | 34.55 |
| 1709 | 8,225 | 15.31 | 0.128 | 36.68 |
| 1710 | 8,210 | 15.22 | 0.128 | 39.26 |
| 1711 | 8,281 | 15.29 | 0.128 | 38.80 |
| 1712 | 8,325 | 15.31 | 0.128 | 39.73 |
| 1713 | 8,320 | 15.24 | 0.128 | 40.50 |
| 1714 | 8,293 | 15.13 | 0.127 | 36.55 |
| 1715 | 8,315 | 15.11 | 0.127 | 39.26 |
| 1716 | 8,336 | 15.09 | 0.127 | 37.93 |
| 1717 | 8,199 | 15.13 | 0.124 | 34.84 |
| 1718 | 8,336 | 15.11 | 0.126 | 33.83 |
| 1719 | 8,260 | 15.09 | 0.124 | 34.95 |
| 1720 | 8,362 | 15.04 | 0.125 | 32.02 |
| 1721 | 8,303 | 15.05 | 0.124 | 34.38 |
| 1722 | 8,381 | 15.17 | 0.124 | 34.69 |
| 1723 | 8,450 | 15.20 | 0.125 | 34.98 |
| 1724 | 8,412 | 15.11 | 0.124 | 35.39 |
| 1725 | 8,445 | 15.11 | 0.124 | 33.97 |
| 1726 | 8,499 | 15.15 | 0.124 | 34.55 |
| 1727 | 8,582 | 15.24 | 0.125 | 35.45 |
| 1728 | 8,601 | 15.11 | 0.125 | 32.45 |
| 1729 | 8,565 | 14.92 | 0.124 | 34.76 |
| 1730 | 8,514 | 14.81 | 0.122 | 35.81 |
| 1731 | 8,560 | 14.94 | 0.123 | 36.44 |
| 1732 | 8,678 | 15.09 | 0.124 | 35.53 |
| 1733 | 8,783 | 15.18 | 0.125 | 34.72 |
| 1734 | 8,916 | 15.39 | 0.126 | 34.95 |
| 1735 | 9,003 | 15.41 | 0.127 | 35.55 |
| 1736 | 8,859 | 15.18 | 0.125 | 33.41 |
| 1737 | 8,798 | 15.02 | 0.123 | 35.98 |
| 1738 | 8,765 | 14.91 | 0.122 | 35.98 |
| 1739 | 8,776 | 14.91 | 0.122 | 36.11 |
| 1740 | 8,826 | 14.94 | 0.122 | 34.16 |
| 1741 | 8,887 | 14.92 | 0.123 | 32.97 |
| 1742 | 8,898 | 14.85 | 0.123 | 32.75 |
| 1743 | 8,972 | 14.85 | 0.123 | 34.05 |
| 1744 | 9,037 | 14.87 | 0.124 | 35.10 |
| 1745 | 9,093 | 14.98 | 0.124 | 35.66 |
| 1746 | 9,131 | 15.13 | 0.124 | 33.54 |
| 1747 | 9,307 | 15.26 | 0.126 | 32.95 |
| 1748 | 9,205 | 15.11 | 0.124 | 32.59 |
| 1749 | 9,026 | 14.80 | 0.121 | 32.57 |
| 1750 | 8,926 | 14.55 | 0.120 | 32.57 |
| 1751 | 8,837 | 14.39 | 0.118 | 33.28 |
| 1752 | 8,957 | 14.50 | 0.119 | 31.21 |
| 1753 | 9,033 | 14.54 | 0.120 | 31.84 |
| 1754 | 8,985 | 14.48 | 0.119 | 33.10 |
| 1755 | 9,140 | 14.68 | 0.120 | 32.97 |
| 1756 | 9,334 | 14.94 | 0.122 | 32.27 |
| 1757 | 9,322 | 14.87 | 0.122 | 28.72 |
| 1758 | 9,451 | 14.85 | 0.123 | 28.98 |
| 1759 | 9,099 | 14.15 | 0.118 | 30.91 |
| 1760 | 9,059 | 14.14 | 0.117 | 29.84 |
| 1761 | 9,456 | 14.54 | 0.122 | 29.88 |
| 1762 | 9,895 | 15.27 | 0.127 | 30.06 |
| 1763 | 9,859 | 14.99 | 0.126 | 28.90 |
| 1764 | 9,456 | 14.70 | 0.121 | 28.08 |
| 1765 | 9,571 | 14.83 | 0.122 | 28.23 |
| 1766 | 9,696 | 14.80 | 0.123 | 28.06 |
| 1767 | 9,828 | 14.85 | 0.124 | 27.30 |
| 1768 | 9,782 | 14.80 | 0.123 | 27.94 |
| 1769 | 9,897 | 14.72 | 0.124 | 28.06 |
| 1770 | 9,839 | 14.62 | 0.123 | 28.79 |
| 1771 | 9,853 | 14.66 | 0.123 | 27.10 |
| 1772 | 9,790 | 14.52 | 0.122 | 27.17 |
| 1773 | 9,662 | 14.62 | 0.120 | 26.28 |
| 1774 | 9,670 | 14.62 | 0.120 | 26.55 |
| 1775 | 9,745 | 14.72 | 0.120 | 25.78 |
| 1776 | 9,663 | 14.55 | 0.119 | 25.71 |
| 1777 | 9,687 | 14.54 | 0.119 | 24.58 |
| 1778 | 9,811 | 14.68 | 0.120 | 24.97 |
| 1779 | 9,923 | 14.80 | 0.121 | 26.06 |
| 1780 | 9,900 | 14.72 | 0.120 | 25.18 |
| 1781 | 9,972 | 14.78 | 0.121 | 22.08 |
| 1782 | 9,759 | 14.42 | 0.118 | 22.38 |
| 1783 | 9,877 | 14.48 | 0.119 | 23.12 |
| 1784 | 10,058 | 14.70 | 0.120 | 24.19 |
| 1785 | 10,217 | 14.92 | 0.122 | 24.47 |
| 1786 | 10,251 | 14.96 | 0.122 | 22.94 |
| 1787 | 10,256 | 14.92 | 0.122 | 23.75 |
| 1788 | 10,101 | 14.65 | 0.119 | 24.87 |
| 1789 | 10,201 | 14.75 | 0.120 | 25.03 |
| 1790 | 10,434 | 15.04 | 0.123 | 22.95 |
| 1791 | 10,472 | 15.05 | 0.123 | 23.04 |
| 1792 | 10,588 | 15.17 | 0.124 | 21.18 |
| 1793 | 10,501 | 15.00 | 0.122 | 21.99 |
| 1794 | 10,793 | 15.37 | 0.125 | 22.72 |
| 1795 | 10,952 | 15.55 | 0.127 | 18.86 |
| 1796 | 11,055 | 15.65 | 0.128 | 18.19 |
| 1797 | 10,918 | 15.41 | 0.126 | 18.38 |
| 1798 | 11,131 | 15.59 | 0.128 | 17.73 |
| 1799 | 11,245 | 15.74 | 0.129 | 16.17 |
| 1800 | 11,289 | 15.68 | 0.129 | 14.34 |
| 1801 | 11,209 | 15.46 | 0.128 | 13.65 |
| 1802 | 11,115 | 15.26 | 0.127 | 15.97 |
| 1803 | 11,369 | 15.41 | 0.129 | 16.50 |
| 1804 | 11,422 | 15.41 | 0.130 | 15.80 |
| 1805 | 11,704 | 15.79 | 0.133 | 14.69 |
| 1806 | 11,730 | 15.52 | 0.132 | 14.91 |
| 1807 | 11,794 | 15.43 | 0.133 | 14.30 |
| 1808 | 12,429 | 16.08 | 0.140 | 15.00 |
| 1809 | 12,573 | 15.96 | 0.141 | 14.09 |
| 1810 | 12,559 | 15.77 | 0.141 | 13.10 |
| 1811 | 13,863 | 15.53 | 0.155 | 15.55 |
| 1812 | 15,273 | 16.11 | 0.170 | 16.39 |
| 1813 | 16,193 | 16.25 | 0.180 | 16.27 |
| 1814 | 13,556 | 15.04 | 0.151 | 15.66 |
| 1815 | 13,250 | 15.26 | 0.147 | 14.77 |
| 1816 | 11,592 | 15.28 | 0.128 | 14.76 |
| 1817 | 11,450 | 15.11 | 0.126 | 14.35 |
| 1818 | 11,927 | 15.35 | 0.131 | 14.39 |
| 1819 | 11,764 | 15.33 | 0.129 | 15.35 |
| 1820 | 11,684 | 15.62 | 0.128 | 14.98 |
| 1821 | | 15.95 | 0.131 | |
| 1822 | | 15.80 | 0.129 | |
| 1823 | | 15.84 | 0.129 | |
| 1824 | | 15.82 | 0.129 | |
| 1825 | | 15.70 | 0.128 | |
| 1826 | | 15.76 | 0.129 | |
| 1827 | | 15.74 | 0.128 | |
| 1828 | | 15.78 | 0.129 | |
| 1829 | | 15.78 | 0.129 | |
| 1830 | 9,100 | 15.82 | 0.129 | 12.39 |
| 1831 | | 15.72 | 0.129 | |
| 1832 | | 15.73 | 0.129 | |
| 1833 | | 15.93 | 0.130 | |
| 1834 | | 15.73 | 0.129 | |
| 1835 | | 15.80 | 0.129 | |
| 1836 | | 15.72 | 0.129 | |
| 1837 | | 15.83 | 0.129 | |
| 1838 | | 15.85 | 0.130 | |
| 1839 | | 15.62 | 0.128 | |
| 1840 | 7,560 | 15.62 | 0.128 | 9.44 |
| 1841 | | 15.70 | 0.128 | |
| 1842 | | 15.87 | 0.130 | |
| 1843 | | 15.93 | 0.130 | |
| 1844 | | 15.85 | 0.130 | |
| 1845 | | 15.92 | 0.130 | |
| 1846 | | 15.90 | 0.130 | |
| 1847 | | 15.80 | 0.129 | |
| 1848 | | 15.85 | 0.130 | |
| 1849 | | 15.78 | 0.129 | |
| 1850 | 5,910 | 15.70 | 0.128 | 7.76 |
| 1851 | | 15.46 | 0.126 | |
| 1852 | | 15.59 | 0.127 | |
| 1853 | | 15.33 | 0.125 | |
| 1854 | | 15.33 | 0.125 | |
| 1855 | | 15.38 | 0.126 | |
| 1856 | | 15.38 | 0.126 | |
| 1857 | | 15.27 | 0.125 | |
| 1858 | | 15.38 | 0.126 | |
| 1859 | | 15.19 | 0.124 | |
| 1860 | 4,100 | 15.29 | 0.125 | 4.08 |
| 1861 | | 15.50 | 0.127 | |
| 1862 | | 15.35 | 0.125 | |
| 1863 | | 15.37 | 0.126 | |
| 1864 | | 15.37 | 0.126 | |
| 1865 | | 15.44 | 0.126 | |
| 1866 | | 15.43 | 0.126 | |
| 1867 | | 15.57 | 0.127 | |
| 1868 | | 15.59 | 0.127 | |
| 1869 | | 15.60 | 0.128 | |
| 1870 | 3,332 | 15.57 | 0.127 | 2.51 |
| 1871 | 3,348 | 15.57 | 0.127 | 2.36 |
| 1872 | 3,376 | 15.63 | 0.128 | 2.27 |
| 1873 | 3,441 | 15.93 | 0.130 | 2.19 |
| 1874 | 3,507 | 16.16 | 0.132 | 2.23 |
| 1875 | 3,628 | 16.64 | 0.136 | 2.31 |
| 1876 | 3,887 | 17.75 | 0.145 | 2.37 |
| 1877 | 3,784 | 17.20 | 0.141 | 2.43 |
| 1878 | 3,960 | 17.92 | 0.146 | 2.51 |
| 1879 | 4,083 | 18.39 | 0.150 | 2.64 |
| 1880 | 4,025 | 18.05 | 0.148 | 2.49 |
| 1881 | 4,088 | 18.25 | 0.149 | 2.48 |
| 1882 | 4,095 | 18.20 | 0.149 | 2.43 |
| 1883 | 4,213 | 18.64 | 0.152 | 2.44 |
| 1884 | 4,056 | 18.61 | 0.152 | 2.43 |
| 1885 | 3,991 | 19.41 | 0.145 | 2.36 |
| 1886 | 4,193 | 20.78 | 0.157 | 2.31 |
| 1887 | 4,525 | 21.10 | 0.161 | 2.37 |
| 1888 | 4,773 | 22.00 | 0.168 | 2.33 |
| 1889 | 4,769 | 22.10 | 0.172 | 2.21 |
| 1890 | 5,190 | 19.75 | 0.179 | 2.64 |
| 1891 | 5,304 | 20.92 | 0.201 | 2.56 |
| 1892 | 5,630 | 23.72 | 0.197 | 2.47 |
| 1893 | 5,307 | 26.49 | 0.181 | 2.10 |
| 1894 | 4,869 | | 0.163 | |
| 1895 | 5,371 | | 0.183 | |
| 1896 | 5,333 | | 0.196 | |
| 1897 | 5,561 | | 0.173 | |
| 1898 | 6,227 | | 0.192 | |
| 1899 | 6,715 | | 0.224 | |
| 1900 | 7,080 | | 0.228 | |
| 1901 | 7,666 | | 0.242 | |
| 1902 | 8,283 | | 0.242 | |
| 1903 | 8,926 | | 0.258 | |
| 1904 | 8,840 | | 0.255 | |
| 1905 | 9,910 | | 0.291 | |
| 1906 | 10,684 | | 0.306 | |
| 1907 | 11,653 | | 0.355 | |
| 1908 | 10,373 | | 0.312 | |
| 1909 | 11,094 | | 0.294 | |
| 1910 | 11,506 | | 0.305 | |
| 1911 | 11,822 | | 0.315 | |
| 1912 | 12,869 | | 0.342 | |
| 1913 | 13,473 | | 0.365 | |
| 1914 | 12,557 | | 0.321 | |
| 1915 | 13,313 | | 0.348 | |
| 1916 | 17,087 | | 0.431 | |
| 1917 | 20,552 | 24.61 | 0.526 | 3.35 |
| 1918 | 26,105 | 21.00 | 0.761 | 4.17 |
| 1919 | 26,966 | 18.44 | 0.689 | 4.54 |
| 1920 | 30,428 | 20.28 | 0.839 | 4.21 |
| 1921 | 25,337 | 17.03 | 0.651 | 5.00 |
| 1922 | 25,278 | 15.42 | 0.624 | 6.18 |
| 1923 | 29,403 | 14.70 | 0.755 | 7.92 |
| 1924 | 29,930 | 13.92 | 0.735 | 8.29 |
| 1925 | 31,179 | 13.33 | 0.759 | 8.70 |
| 1926 | 33,374 | 13.37 | 0.792 | 9.63 |
| 1927 | 32,890 | 13.37 | 0.783 | 8.94 |
| 1928 | 33,517 | 13.34 | 0.795 | 9.14 |
| 1929 | 35,663 | 13.41 | 0.812 | 9.40 |
| 1930 | 31,435 | 13.46 | 0.713 | 8.36 |
| 1931 | 26,389 | 13.48 | 0.603 | 7.42 |
| 1932 | 20,286 | 13.34 | 0.458 | 5.85 |
| 1933 | 19,502 | 13.31 | 0.440 | 5.48 |
| 1934 | 22,775 | 13.31 | 0.511 | 6.05 |
| 1935 | 25,298 | 13.28 | 0.574 | 6.39 |
| 1936 | 28,912 | 13.27 | 0.632 | 6.85 |
| 1937 | 31,708 | 13.24 | 0.705 | 6.99 |
| 1938 | 29,799 | 13.35 | 0.662 | 6.26 |
| 1939 | 31,845 | 13.32 | 0.693 | 6.21 |
| 1940 | 35,084 | 12.72 | 0.741 | 5.90 |
| 1941 | 44,085 | 13.38 | 0.913 | 5.79 |
| 1942 | 56,597 | 13.41 | 1.178 | 6.73 |
| 1943 | 69,247 | 13.41 | 1.384 | 7.72 |
| 1944 | 76,509 | 13.41 | 1.545 | 8.42 |
| 1945 | 77,736 | 13.38 | 1.597 | 8.77 |
| 1946 | 77,566 | 13.38 | 1.677 | 8.60 |
| 1947 | 85,101 | 13.38 | 1.830 | 8.71 |
| 1948 | 93,590 | 13.34 | 1.988 | 8.73 |
| 1949 | 92,908 | 13.32 | 1.902 | 8.00 |

== Republic of India relative to the US economy ==
GDP at market prices
| Year | Gross domestic product (000,000 rupees) | ₹ per USD | GDP deflator (index 2011 = 100) | Per capita income (as % of USA) |
|---|---|---|---|---|
| 1950 | 102,216 | 4.79 | 2.057 | 3.06 |
| 1951 | 108,633 | 4.79 | 2.124 | 2.81 |
| 1952 | 106,634 | 4.78 | 2.031 | 2.61 |
| 1953 | 116,067 | 4.75 | 2.083 | 2.69 |
| 1954 | 109,771 | 4.76 | 1.880 | 2.53 |
| 1955 | 111,748 | 4.79 | 1.853 | 2.35 |
| 1956 | 133,139 | 4.78 | 2.092 | 2.65 |
| 1957 | 137,104 | 4.78 | 2.163 | 2.58 |
| 1958 | 152,835 | 4.75 | 2.245 | 2.83 |
| 1959 | 161,017 | 4.75 | 2.305 | 2.75 |
| 1960 | 176,333 | 4.77 | 2.392 | 2.73 |
| 1961 | 186,821 | 4.77 | 2.444 | 2.78 |
| 1962 | 200,769 | 4.76 | 2.551 | 2.77 |
| 1963 | 230,580 | 4.77 | 2.765 | 3.00 |
| 1964 | 268,953 | 4.78 | 3.001 | 3.23 |
| 1965 | 283,600 | 4.78 | 3.250 | 3.12 |
| 1966 | 321,058 | 6.03 | 3.681 | 2.17 |
| 1967 | 376,012 | 7.54 | 3.999 | 2.22 |
| 1968 | 398,141 | 7.54 | 4.095 | 2.13 |
| 1969 | 438,360 | 7.56 | 4.232 | 2.14 |
| 1970 | 468,169 | 7.56 | 4.298 | 2.15 |
| 1971 | 501,199 | 7.50 | 4.527 | 2.11 |
| 1972 | 552,453 | 7.55 | 5.018 | 2.02 |
| 1973 | 672,407 | 8.28 | 5.912 | 2.14 |
| 1974 | 793,779 | 8.03 | 6.898 | 2.26 |
| 1975 | 852,124 | 8.39 | 6.784 | 2.03 |
| 1976 | 918,117 | 8.97 | 7.190 | 1.87 |
| 1977 | 1,040,235 | 8.77 | 7.595 | 1.97 |
| 1978 | 1,126,714 | 8.19 | 7.782 | 1.95 |
| 1979 | 1,235,622 | 8.16 | 9.006 | 1.92 |
| 1980 | 1,470,629 | 7.89 | 10.043 | 2.12 |
| 1981 | 1,727,755 | 8.68 | 11.130 | 1.94 |
| 1982 | 1,932,546 | 9.48 | 12.031 | 1.90 |
| 1983 | 2,250,742 | 10.10 | 13.060 | 1.87 |
| 1984 | 2,521,882 | 11.35 | 14.095 | 1.62 |
| 1985 | 2,845,341 | 12.33 | 15.109 | 1.63 |
| 1986 | 3,183,659 | 12.60 | 16.135 | 1.63 |
| 1987 | 3,618,647 | 12.94 | 17.640 | 1.70 |
| 1988 | 4,293,630 | 13.90 | 19.092 | 1.65 |
| 1989 | 4,932,776 | 16.21 | 20.702 | 1.51 |
| 1990 | 5,761,092 | 17.49 | 22.911 | 1.54 |
| 1991 | 6,622,605 | 22.71 | 26.062 | 1.24 |
| 1992 | 7,611,959 | 28.16 | 28.398 | 1.25 |
| 1993 | 8,759,924 | 31.29 | 31.199 | 1.14 |
| 1994 | 10,275,701 | 31.39 | 34.312 | 1.25 |
| 1995 | 12,055,827 | 32.42 | 37.422 | 1.30 |
| 1996 | 13,948,160 | 35.51 | 40.257 | 1.33 |
| 1997 | 15,452,939 | 36.37 | 42.864 | 1.32 |
| 1998 | 17,722,970 | 41.36 | 46.297 | 1.26 |
| 1999 | 19,882,616 | 43.13 | 47.718 | 1.28 |
| 2000 | 21,398,857 | 45.00 | 49.457 | 1.22 |
| 2001 | 23,152,430 | 47.22 | 51.048 | 1.22 |
| 2002 | 24,926,138 | 48.63 | 52.944 | 1.24 |
| 2003 | 27,925,301 | 46.59 | 54.992 | 1.38 |
| 2004 | 31,863,319 | 45.26 | 58.141 | 1.50 |
| 2005 | 36,321,247 | 44.00 | 61.409 | 1.62 |
| 2006 | 42,546,290 | 45.19 | 66.568 | 1.74 |
| 2007 | 48,986,621 | 41.18 | 71.191 | 2.14 |
| 2008 | 55,141,524 | 43.39 | 77.736 | 2.06 |
| 2009 | 63,664,065 | 48.33 | 83.209 | 2.33 |
| 2010 | 76,344,721 | 45.65 | 91.968 | 2.79 |
| 2011 | 87,363,287 | 46.58 | 100.000 | 2.91 |
| 2012 | 99,440,131 | 53.37 | 107.934 | 2.79 |
| 2013 | 112,335,216 | 58.51 | 114.612 | 2.72 |
| 2014 | 124,679,593 | 61.00 | 118.430 | 2.86 |
| 2015 | 137,718,739 | 64.11 | 121.130 | 2.83 |
| 2016 | 153,916,690 | 67.20 | 125.052 | 2.99 |
| 2017 | 170,900,424 | 65.12 | 130.016 | 3.31 |
| 2018 | 188,996,684 | 68.40 | 135.066 | 3.18 |
| 2019 | 200,748,558 | 70.42 | 138.295 | 3.18 |
| 2020 | 198,009,138 | 74.10 | 146.041 | 3.07 |
| 2021 | 236,438,748 | 73.92 | 160.062 | 3.29 |
