= List of continents by GDP =

Countries by estimated nominal GDP in 2024:^{n12}: > $20 trillion $10–20 trillion $5–10 trillion $1–5 trillion / $750 billion – $1 trillion $500–750 billion $250–500 billion $100–250 billion / $50–100 billion $25–50 billion $5–25 billion < $5 billion

This article includes a list of continents of the world sorted by their gross domestic product (GDP), the market value of all final goods and services from a continent in a given year. The GDP dollar estimates presented here are calculated at market or government official exchange rates. The figures presented here do not take into account differences in the cost of living in different countries, and the results can vary greatly from one year to another based on fluctuations in the exchange rates of the country's currency. Such fluctuations may change a continents ranking from one year to the next, even though they often make little or no difference to the standard of living of its population. Therefore, these figures should be used with caution. Comparisons of national wealth are also frequently made on the basis of purchasing power parity (PPP), to adjust for differences in the cost of living in different countries. (See List of countries by GDP (PPP).) PPP largely removes the exchange rate problem, but has its own drawbacks; it does not reflect the value of economic output in international trade, and it also requires more estimation than GDP per capita. On the whole, PPP per capita figures are more narrowly spread than nominal GDP per capita figures.

The following lists summarise the GDP (nominal) of each continent by adding GDP (nominal) of each nation as per the seven-continent model, sorted by USD. The first list includes 2024 data estimates^{n1} for members of the International Monetary Fund. The second list shows the World Bank's estimates, and the third list includes mostly 2024 estimates from the CIA World Factbook.

In these lists, the sovereign states and dependent territories are classified according to the geoscheme created by the United Nations Statistics Division. According to the UN, the assignment of countries or areas to specific groupings is for statistical convenience and does not imply any assumption regarding political or other affiliation of countries or territories.

For more information, see list of sovereign states and dependent territories by continent.

== Continents by GDP (nominal) ==
List by the International Monetary Fund (2026 estimate)
Rank	Continent	GDP (billions of USD)	Share (%)	Country(ies) collectively constituting at least 50% of the GDP (nominal)
–	World	126,295	100.0%	United States (25.6%); China (16.5%); Germany (4.3%); Japan (3.5%); United Kingdom (3.4%)
1	Asia	44,852	35.5%	China (46.5%); Japan (9.8%)
2	North America	37,889	30.0%	United States (85.5%)
3	Europe	32,326	25.6%	Germany (16.9%); United Kingdom (13.2%); France (11.1%); Italy (8.5%); Russia (8.2%)
4	South America	5,140	4.1%	Brazil (51.3%)
5	Africa	3,555	2.8%	South Africa (13.5%); Egypt (12.1%); Nigeria (10.6%); Algeria (8.9%); Morocco (5.5%)
6	Oceania	2,449	1.9%	Australia (86.7%)
–	Unaccounted	84	0.1%	N/A

Note:

- Antarctica has no permanent population. However, if conventional GDP methodology is applied, which includes salaries of residents, as well as construction and equipment procurement (the biggest "industries" in Antarctica), the GDP of the continent would exceed one billion United States dollars.

== Continents by GDP (PPP) ==
List by the International Monetary Fund (2026 estimate)
Rank	Continent	GDP (billions of current Int$)	Share (%)	Country(ies) collectively constituting at least 50% of the GDP (PPP)
–	World	222,760	100.0%	China (19.9%); United States (14.5%); India (8.5%); Russia (3.4%); Japan (3.3%); Germany (2.9%)
1	Asia	110,229	49.5%	China (40.2%); India (17.1%)
2	Europe	46,142	20.7%	Russia (16.3%); Germany (13.9%); France (10.3%); United Kingdom (10.2%)
3	North America	40,657	18.3%	United States (79.7%)
4	Africa	12,519	5.6%	Egypt (20.5%); Nigeria (19.4%); South Africa (8.6%); Algeria (7.5%)
5	South America	10,558	4.7%	Brazil (49.5%); Argentina (15.1%)
6	Oceania	2,486	1.1%	Australia (84.4%)
–	Unaccounted	169	0.1%	N/A

== Continents by GDP per capita (nominal) ==
List by the International Monetary Fund (2026 estimate)
Rank	Continent	GDP per capita (USD)	Peak year
1	North America	$62,424	2026
2	Oceania	$49,944	2026
3	Europe	$43,762	2026
–	World	$15,679	2026
4	South America	$11,730	2026
5	Asia	$9,544	2026
6	Africa	$2,608	2014

== Continents by GDP per capita (PPP) ==
List by the International Monetary Fund (2026 estimate)
Rank	Continent	GDP per capita (USD)	Peak year
1	North America	$66,984	2026
2	Europe	$62,466	2026
3	Oceania	$50,701	2026
–	World	$27,655	2026
4	South America	$24,095	2026
5	Asia	$23,456	2026
6	Africa	$8,330	2026

== Notes ==
1. Estimated by the International Monetary Fund (IMF) staff.
2. Figures exclude Taiwan and the special administrative regions of Hong Kong and Macao.
3. The Eurozone in 2010 was 16 of 27 European Union countries: Austria, Belgium, Cyprus, Finland, France, Germany, Greece, Ireland, Italy, Luxembourg, Malta, the Netherlands, Portugal, Slovakia, Slovenia, and Spain.
4. Data include the French overseas departments of French Guiana, Guadeloupe, Martinique, and Réunion.
5. Excludes Kosovo.
6. Hyperinflation and the plunging value of the Zimbabwean dollar makes Zimbabwe's nominal GDP a highly inaccurate statistic.
7. Excludes data for Transnistria.
8. Includes former Spanish Sahara.
9. Data are for the area controlled by the Government of the Republic of Cyprus.
10. Covers Mainland Tanzania only.
11. Excludes Abkhazia and South Ossetia.
12. Based on the best available GDP figure for each country at the time of creation (16 June 2024). Best available GDP figure was defined as the latest available figure from the International Monetary Fund (including forecasts for the current year), otherwise the latest available figure from the World Bank, otherwise the latest available figure from the United Nations Statistics Division; however, countries that didn't have any figure for a year more recent than 2019 were not included at all. For almost all countries, the latest IMF forecast figure for 2024 was used.
