= List of Asian countries by GDP (PPP) per capita =

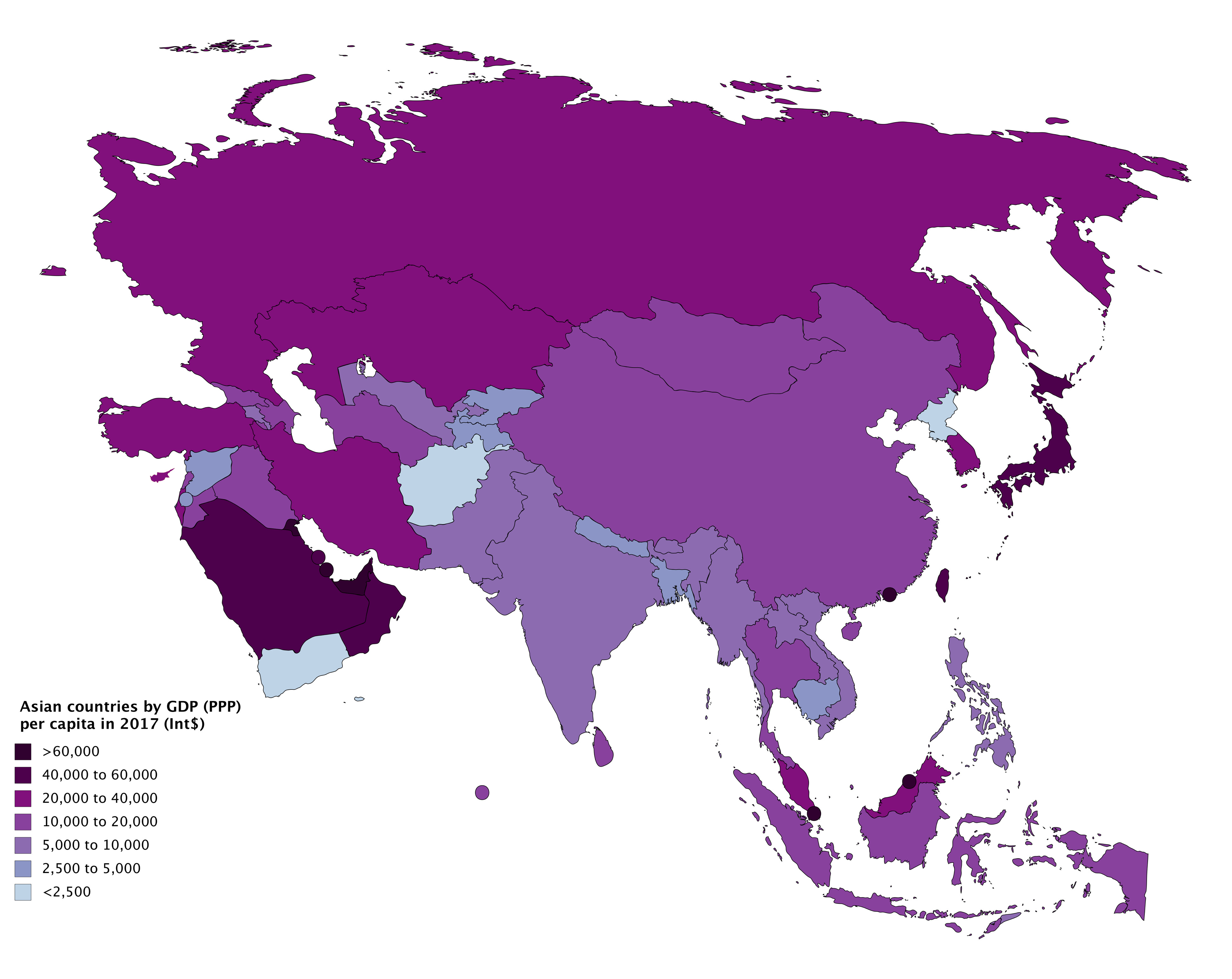
Asian countries by GDP (PPP) per capita in 2017

This is a list of Asian countries by GDP per capita based on purchasing power parity. All figures are given in international dollars and are the latest estimates from the International Monetary Fund. Countries with contiguous boundaries that are partially (but not entirely) located in Asia are shown here in italics, but GDP per capita figures are given for the whole state. Dependent territories (not sovereign states) are not ranked, and are also shown in italics.

== List of Asian countries by GDP (PPP) per capita ==
Below is a table of sovereign states in Asia by GDP (PPP) per capita in international dollars.

Rank	Country	2031 (project.)	2026	2020	2010	2000
1	Singapore	$215,234	$176,927	$102,117	$70,553	$40,966
2	Macau (Note: A Special Administrative Region of the People's Republic of China.)	$173,925	$141,442	$57,269	$103,229	$N/A
3	Qatar	$170,374	$103,804	$81,003	$95,907	$63,608
4	Taiwan	$136,337	$103,743	$57,996	$36,619	$20,463
5	Brunei	$122,045	$97,858	$70,673	$62,884	$57,250
6	Hong Kong (Note: A Special Administrative Region of the People's Republic of China.)	$103,315	$85,843	$58,613	$45,407	$25,972
7	United Arab Emirates	$114,421	$83,703	$67,594	$60,746	$69,756
8	Saudi Arabia	$93,859	$74,295	$47,478	$45,122	$33,278
9	South Korea	$87,745	$70,251	$47,881	$32,202	$17,432
10	Cyprus	$84,046	$68,256	$42,854	$34,844	$24,075
11	Bahrain	$84,083	$63,737	$53,436	$42,346	$39,279
12	Israel	$73,541	$60,099	$40,798	$30,824	$22,103
13	Japan	$70,427	$59,712	$43,702	$34,724	$26,780
14	Russia	$62,245	$52,602	$31,778	$21,377	$10,610
15	Kazakhstan (Note: Mostly located in Central Asia, but its regions of West Kazakhstan and Atyrau are partly located in Europe.)	$61,896	$48,351	$30,166	$18,601	$7,473
16	Malaysia	$62,119	$47,453	$28,696	$18,733	$11,815
17	Turkey (Note: The European portion of Turkey is known as East Thrace, making up about 3% of the country's land area and 14% of its population.)	$61,406	$46,679	$29,209	$17,935	$11,061
18	Kuwait	$65,489	$46,552	$42,076	$50,428	$35,873
19	Oman	$52,974	$46,196	$35,774	$34,519	$25,265
20	Maldives	$46,890	$37,791	$17,883	$16,734	$9,824
21	Georgia (Note: The municipality of Kazbegi is located in Europe, which makes up about 0.1% of the country's population.)	$46,848	$32,661	$16,817	$8,522	$3,445
22	China	$42,877	$31,785	$18,255	$8,394	$2,641
23	Thailand	$34,877	$27,724	$19,156	$13,114	$7,391
24	Armenia	$39,006	$26,916	$14,702	$7,987	$2,800
25	Azerbaijan (Note: The districts of Qusar, Shabran, Siazan, Khachmaz and Quba are geographically in Europe, placing about 5% of the population in Europe.)	$31,634	$26,785	$15,345	$12,869	$2,991
26	Turkmenistan	$29,276	$24,401	$16,647	$8,187	$2,008
27	Mongolia	$30,597	$22,428	$13,530	$6,510	$3,303
28	Bhutan	$29,900	$20,335	$12,879	$7,201	$3,195
29	Iran	$23,763	$20,159	$15,782	$14,201	$8,542
30	Vietnam	$29,070	$19,974	$11,668	$5,776	$2,684
31	Indonesia	$26,197	$19,091	$11,929	$7,462	$4,124
32	Sri Lanka	$23,535	$18,246	$12,941	$8,482	$4,515
33	Uzbekistan	$19,533	$14,421	$8,669	$4,893	$2,343
34	Philippines	$18,886	$13,642	$8,456	$5,267	$3,230
35	Jordan	$15,776	$13,328	$10,564	$11,570	$6,873
36	Iraq	$18,011	$13,007	$11,182	$7,545	N/A
37	India	$19,376	$12,997	$6,815	$3,748	$1,863
38	Laos	$15,095	$12,054	$7,756	$4,276	$2,018
39	Lebanon	N/A	N/A	$12,671	$20,362	$11,014
40	Bangladesh	$13,315	$10,884	$6,705	$3,100	$1,690
41	Kyrgyzstan	$14,127	$10,342	$5,345	$3,727	$2,264
42	Cambodia	$11,904	$8,870	$5,874	$2,974	$1,248
43	Pakistan	$9,177	$7,371	$5,436	$4,283	$2,841
44	Tajikistan	$9,276	$6,727	$3,759	$2,002	$927
45	Nepal	$9,381	$6,615	$4,235	$2,448	$1,495
46	East Timor	$6,498	$5,288	$6,190	$2,963	$2,317
47	Myanmar	$6,109	$5,283	$5,585	$2,836	$898
48	West Bank and Gaza	N/A	N/A	$5,608	$4,353	$2,990
49	Afghanistan	N/A	N/A	$2,589	$1,900	$N/A
50	Yemen	$1,614	$1,571	$1,602	N/A	$N/A

== See also ==
- List of countries by GDP (PPP) per capita
- List of Asian countries by GDP PPP
