= List of Asian states by GDP growth =

This is a list of estimates of the real gross domestic product growth rate (not rebased GDP) in Asian states for the latest years recorded in the CIA World Factbook. All sovereign states with United Nations membership and territory in Asia are included on the list apart from those who are also members of the Council of Europe. In addition, the list includes the special administrative regions of China (Hong Kong and Macao) and Taiwan. Dependent territories of non-Asian states are excluded.

== List ==
List of Asian Countries by Real GDP Growth Rate

Rank	Country	GDP growth rate (%)	Year
1	Bhutan	▲7.5	2026 est.
2	Vietnam	▲7.1	2026 est.
3	India	▲6.5	2026 est.
3	Uzbekistan	▲6.5	2026 est.
5	Kyrgyzstan	▲6.1	2026 est.
6	Tajikistan	▲6.0	2026 est.
6	Armenia	▲5.3	2026 est.
6	Georgia	▲5.3	2026 est.
9	Mongolia	▲5.3	2026 est.
9	Taiwan	▲5.2	2026 est.
11	Indonesia	▲5.0	2026 est.
11	Bangladesh	▲4.7	2026 est.
13	Malaysia	▲4.7	2026 est.
14	Kazakhstan	▲4.6	2026 est.
15	China	▲4.4	2026 est.
16	Philippines	▲4.1	2026 est.
17	Timor Leste	▲4.1	2026 est.
17	Cambodia	▲4.0	2026 est.
19	Laos	▲4.0	2026 est.
20	Pakistan	▲3.6	2026 est.
21	Israel	▲3.5	2026 est.
22	Oman	▲3.5	2026 est.
23	Singapore	▲3.5	2026 est.
23	Turkey	▲3.4	2026 est.
25	Saudi Arabia	▲3.1	2026 est.
26	United Arab Emirates	▲3.1	2026 est.
27	Macao	▲3.0	2026 est.
27	Maldives	▲3.0	2026 est.
29	Myanmar	▲3.0	2026 est.
30	Nepal	▲3.0	2026 est.
31	Jordan	▲2.7	2026 est.
32	Brunei	▲2.6	2026 est.
33	Turkmenistan	▲2.6	2026 est.
33	Hongkong	▲2.4	2026 est.
35	Azerbaijan	▲2.2	2026 est.
36	Korea, South	▲1.9	2026 est.
37	Thailand	▲1.5	2026 est.
38	Japan	▲0.7	2026 est.
38	Yemen	▲0.5	2026 est.
40	Bahrain	▼-0.5	2026 est.
41	Kuwait	▼ -0.6	2026 est.
42	Iran	▼-6.1	2026 est.
43	Iraq	▼-6.8	2026 est.
44	Qatar	▼-8.6	2026 est.

== Regions ==
Middle East

Rank	Country	GDP growth rate (%)
1	Bahrain	3.8
2	Iran	3.7
3	Israel	3.3
4	Jordan	2.0
5	Qatar	1.6
6	Lebanon	1.5
7	United Arab Emirates	0.8
8	Oman	-0.9
9	Saudi Arabia	-0.9
10	Iraq	-2.1
11	Kuwait	-3.3
12	Yemen	-5.9
13	Palestine	-21.59
14	Syria	-36.5

South Asia

Rank	Country	GDP growth rate (%)
1	Nepal	7.9
2	Bangladesh	7.4
3	Bhutan	7.4
4	India	6.7
5	Pakistan	5.4
6	Maldives	4.8
7	Sri Lanka	3.3
8	Afghanistan	2.7

Southeast Asia

Rank	Country	GDP growth rate (%)
1	Philippines	6.9
1	Laos	6.9
3	Myanmar	6.8
3	Vietnam	6.8
5	Cambodia	6.7
6	Malaysia	5.9
7	Indonesia	5.1
8	Thailand	3.9
9	Singapore	3.6
10	Brunei	1.3
11	Timor-Leste	-4.6

== See also ==
- Economic growth
- GDP
