= List of Southeast Asian countries by GDP =

This list of Southeast Asian countries by GDP provides a list of Southeast Asian countries according to their respective gross domestic products (GDP).

Nominal GDP IMF 2026
#	World rank	Country	GDP (US$ billions)	GDP per capita (nominal)
1	17	Indonesia	1550.23	5,398
2	27	Singapore	606.22	99,042
3	31	Thailand	561.50	7,979
4	33	Vietnam	527.26	5,110
5	34	Malaysia	516.42	14,762
6	35	Philippines	512.22	4,619
7	91	Myanmar	65.17	1,176
8	100	Cambodia	51.50	2,939
9	146	Brunei	16.45	35,410
10	141	Laos	17.78	2,253
11	180	Timor Leste	2.20	1,574

== See also ==
- List of countries by GDP (nominal)
