= List of Asian and Pacific countries by GDP (PPP) =

This is a list of gross domestic product (GDP) at purchasing power parity (PPP) for the latest year. The estimates are based on data from the World Economic Outlook, which is released biannually by the International Monetary Fund.

All sovereign states with United Nations membership and territory in Asia or Oceania are included on the list apart from Syria due to a lack of data, North Korea which isn't a member of the IMF as well as transcontinental countries that are normally classified as part of Europe (as they are current or suspended members of the Council of Europe) or Africa (in the case of Egypt). In addition, the list includes the special administrative regions of China (Hong Kong and Macau) and Palestine, a UN observer state. All dependent territories (including those under the control of states on this list) are excluded.

The countries are further divided into subregional lists for localised comparisons. The figures provided are quoted in International Dollars and are 2024 estimates unless otherwise noted.

== Asia-Pacific region ==
Country	2026 GDP (PPP) billions of Int'l dollars
China	$44,295.45
India	$18,902.23
Japan	$7,262.16
Indonesia	$5,449.14
Turkey	$4,025.24
South Korea	$3,540.95
Saudi Arabia	$2,894.59
Taiwan	$2,264.63
Pakistan	$2,166.03
Australia	$2,098.89
Vietnam	$2,025.33
Thailand	$1,963.65
Bangladesh	$1,921.75
Iran	$1,784.30
Malaysia	$1,608.50
Philippines	$1,572.56
Singapore	$1,063.24
United Arab Emirates	$1,006.29
Kazakhstan	$993.67
Iraq	$670.51
Hong Kong	$635.59
Israel	$609.14
Uzbekistan	$552.16
Qatar	$358.36
Sri Lanka	$343.10
New Zealand	$312.29
Myanmar	$293.31
Kuwait	$283.13
Azerbaijan	$281.29
Oman	$247.39
Nepal	$194.06
Turkmenistan	$164.42
Cambodia	$160.48
Jordan	$153.64
Bahrain	$115.91
Afghanistan	$101.02 (Note: 2025 estimate)
Macau	$99.61
Laos	$86.49
Armenia	$82.74
Mongolia	$80.40
Kyrgyzstan	$73.89
Lebanon	$70.19
Tajikistan	$69.67
Papua New Guinea	$52.10
Brunei	$45.47
Yemen	$30.93
Palestine	$23.15 (Note: 2025 estimate)
Fiji	$16.07
Bhutan	$15.95
Maldives	$15.80
Timor-Leste	$7.52
Solomon Islands	$2.19
Samoa	$1.89
Vanuatu	$1.40
Tonga	$0.84
Kiribati	$0.51
Micronesia	$0.48
Palau	$0.36
Marshall Islands	$0.30
Nauru	$0.15
Tuvalu	$0.064
Total	$109,067.32

== East Asia ==
Country	2025 GDP (PPP) billions of Int'l dollars
China	$44,295.45
Japan	$7,262.16
South Korea	$3,540.85
Taiwan	$2,274.63
Hong Kong	$635.59
Macau	$99.61
Mongolia	$80.40
Total	$58,188.69

== South Asia ==
Country	2026 GDP (PPP) billions of Int'l dollars
India	$18,902.23
Pakistan	$2,166.03
Bangladesh	$1,921.75
Sri Lanka	$343.10
Nepal	$194.06
Afghanistan	$101.02 (Note: 2025 estimate)
Bhutan	$15.95
Maldives	$15.80
Total	$23,659.94

== Southeast Asia ==
Country	2026 GDP (PPP) billions of Int'l dollars
Indonesia	$5,449.14
Vietnam	$2,025.33
Thailand	$1,963.65
Malaysia	$1,608.50
Philippines	$1,572.56
Singapore	$1,063.24
Myanmar	$293.31
Cambodia	$160.48
Laos	$86.49
Brunei	$45.47
Timor-Leste	$7.52
Total	$14,275.69

== Middle East / West Asia ==
Country	2024 GDP (PPP) billions of Int'l dollars
Turkey	$4,025
Saudi Arabia	$2,109
Iran	$1,696
United Arab Emirates	$848.0
Iraq	$683.3
Israel	$537.8
Qatar	$359.6
Kuwait	$249.1
Oman	$220.1
Jordan	$125.0
Bahrain	$106.5
Yemen	$69.2
Lebanon	$63.2
Palestine	$30.7 (Note: 2023 estimate)
Total	$7,097

== Oceania / Pacific ==
Country	2024 GDP (PPP) billions of Int'l dollars
Australia	$1,898
New Zealand	$287.3
Papua New Guinea	$44.8
Fiji	$14.9
Solomon Islands	$2.05
Samoa	$1.49
Vanuatu	$1.03
Tonga	$0.76
Micronesia	$0.43
Marshall Islands	$0.27
Kiribati	$0.45
Palau	$0.30
Nauru	$0.14
Tuvalu	$0.07
Total	$2,252

== Central Asia ==
Country	2024 GDP (PPP) billions of Int'l dollars
Kazakhstan	$840.1
Uzbekistan	$432.2
Turkmenistan	$177.3
Kyrgyzstan	$57.9
Tajikistan	$57.2
Total	$1,656

== See also ==
- List of ASEAN country subdivisions by GDP
- List of countries in Asia-Pacific by GDP (nominal)
- Economy of Asia
- World economy
