= List of countries in Asia-Pacific by GDP (nominal) =

== 2026 estimates ==
List of countries in Asia-Pacific by GDP (nominal), International Monetary Fund (Estimates for April 2026).

| Rank | Country | GDP (millions of USD) |
|---|---|---|
| 1 | China | 20,851,593 |
| 2 | Japan | 4,379,253 |
| 3 | India | 4,153,191 |
| 4 | Australia | 2,123,963 |
| 5 | South Korea | 1,931,008 |
| 6 | Turkey | 1,640,223 |
| 7 | Indonesia | 1,539,872 |
| 8 | Saudi Arabia | 1,388,676 |
| 9 | Taiwan | 976,719 |
| 10 | Israel | 719,848 |
| 11 | Singapore | 659,572 |
| 12 | United Arab Emirates | 621,546 |
| 13 | Thailand | 579,996 |
| 14 | Vietnam | 527,266 |
| 15 | Malaysia | 516,428 |
| 16 | Philippines | 512,222 |
| 17 | Bangladesh | 510,705 |
| 18 | Pakistan | 452,192 |
| 19 | Hong Kong (China) | 450,138 |
| 20 | Kazakhstan | 360,456 |
| 21 | Iran | 300,293 |
| 22 | New Zealand | 278,636 |
| 23 | Iraq | 264,784 |
| 24 | Qatar | 217,416 |
| 25 | Uzbekistan | 181,502 |
| 26 | Kuwait | 172,920 |
| 27 | Oman | 117,176 |
| 28 | Sri Lanka | 98,964 |
| 29 | Myanmar | 83,832 |
| 30 | Turkmenistan | 83,065 |
| 31 | Azerbaijan | 78,372 |
| 32 | Jordan | 64,909 |
| 33 | Macau (China) | 54,228 |
| 34 | Cambodia | 52,379 |
| 35 | Bahrain | 48,849 |
| 36 | Nepal | 45,884 |
| 37 | Papua New Guinea | 34,403 |
| 38 | Armenia | 31,873 |
| 39 | Mongolia | 28,450 |
| 40 | Kyrgyzstan | 23,606 |
| 41 | Tajikistan | 20,418 |
| 42 | Afghanistan | 19,662 |
| 43 | Laos | 18,959 |
| 44 | Brunei | 16,863 |
| 45 | Palestine | 16,017 |
| 46 | Maldives | 8,130 |
| 47 | Yemen | 7,435 |
| 48 | Fiji | 6,352 |
| 49 | Bhutan | 3,856 |
| 50 | Timor-Leste | 2,170 |
| 51 | Solomon Islands | 1,836 |
| 52 | Vanuatu | 1,396 |
| 53 | Samoa | 1,376 |
| 54 | Tonga | 716 |
| 55 | Micronesia | 521 |
| 56 | Marshall Islands | 342 |
| 57 | Kiribati | 401 |
| 58 | Palau | 377 |
| 59 | Nauru | 196 |
| 60 | Tuvalu | 65 |

=== No Data ===
- American Samoa (US)
- British Indian Ocean Territory (UK)
- Christmas Island (Australia)
- Cocos (Keeling) Islands (Australia)
- Cook Islands (New Zealand)
- French Polynesia (France)
- Guam (US)
- New Caledonia (France)
- Niue (New Zealand)
- Norfolk Island (Australia)
- Northern Mariana Islands (US)
- North Korea
- Pitcairn Islands (UK)
- Tokelau (New Zealand)
- Wallis and Futuna (France)

== See also ==
- List of ASEAN country subdivisions by GDP
- List of Asian countries by GDP (PPP)
- List of Arab League countries by GDP (nominal)
