= Gross world product =

Combined gross national product of all the countries in the world

Chart of the gross world product over the last two millenia

The gross world product (GWP), also known as gross world income (GWI), is the combined gross national income (previously, the "gross national product") of all the countries in the world. Because imports and exports balance exactly when considering the whole world, this also equals the total global gross domestic product (GDP). (Note: See measures of national income and output for more details.)

In purchasing-power-parity (PPP) terms, the World Bank estimated the size of the global economy at approximately $180.0 trillion in 2025, measured in constant 2021 international dollars. Compared to 2015, where the GWP was estimated at around $133.0 trillion (constant 2021 international $), this is an increase of about 35.4%. Based on the same data, the GWP (PPP) grew at an average compounded annual growth rate of approximately 3.36% between 2000 and 2025, while the GWP (PPP) per capita grew by an average 2.18% per year during the same period.

Historically, according to DeLong's 1998 estimates, GWP growth was extremely slow for hundreds of thousands of years when all humans lived as hunter-gatherers. It then rose modestly with the Neolithic Revolution, and again from roughly 4000 BCE onwards when complex societies started to emerge. A period of relative stagnation or mild decline happened between around 1200 and the second half of the 14th century. After this, growth resumed at a somewhat higher and more stable rate from the 1400s through the 1600s. With the Industrial Revolution economic growth accelerated sharply reaching the high compound annual growth rates we experience today.

== Recent growth ==
The table below gives recent values and year-on-year percentage changes for overall GWP growth from 2015 through 2025, according to the World Bank's world GDP (PPP) estimates in constant 2021 international dollars. Percentage-change is calculated year-on-year.

Gross world product (PPP), constant 2021 Intl$ (trillions)
Year	2015	2016	2017	2018	2019	2020	2021	2022	2023	2024	2025
Real GWP	132.98	137.27	142.49	147.69	152.05	147.75	157.41	163.14	168.47	174.16	180.03
Annual growth rate (%)	–	+3.23	+3.80	+3.65	+2.95	−2.83	+6.54	+3.64	+3.27	+3.38	+3.37

The following table shows the recent development of the GWP per capita, measured in constant 2021 international dollars. Percentage-change is calculated year-on-year.

GWP (PPP) per capita (thousands, constant 2021 Intl$)
Year	2015	2016	2017	2018	2019	2020	2021	2022	2023	2024	2025
Real GWP per capita	17,871	18,234	18,715	19,189	19,551	18,812	19,876	20,422	20,895	21,393	21,914
Annual growth rate (%)	–	+2.03	+2.64	+2.53	+1.89	−3.78	+5.66	+2.75	+2.32	+2.38	+2.44

== Historical and prehistorical estimates ==
The following GWP data is based on world GDP (PPP) estimates in 2021 constant international dollars from the World Bank. Historical real GWP per capita (PPP) is sourced from the World Bank and measured in constant 2021 international dollars. "Trillion" in the table below refers to the short scale usage of the term, where 1 trillion = 1,000 billion = 10^{12}.

Year	GWP, PPP (trillions, 2021 Intl$)	Compound annual growth rate (Real GWP, PPP)	GWP per capita, PPP (2021 Intl$)	Compound annual growth rate (Real GWP per capita, PPP)
2025	180.03	4.03%	21,914	+3.10%
2020	147.75	2.13%	18,812	+1.03%
2015	132.98	3.43%	17,871	+2.17%
2010	112.37	3.30%	16,051	+2.23%
2005	95.54	3.94%	14,377	+2.38%
2000	78.75	3.71%	12,781	+2.24%
1995	65.64	+1.90%	11,443	+0.30%
1990	59.75	–	11,275	–

In 1998, economic historian J. Bradford DeLong estimated the total GWP in 1990 U.S. dollars for the main years between one million years BCE and 2000 CE (shown in the table below). "Billion" in the table below refers to the short scale usage of the term, where 1 billion = 1,000 million = 10^{9}.

Year	GWP, PPP (billions, 1990 Intl$)	Compound annual growth rate (Real GWP, PPP)
1995 CE	33,644.33	+4.09%
1990 CE	27,539.57	+4.14%
1985 CE	22,481.11	+3.62%
1980 CE	18,818.44	+4.43%
1975 CE	15,149.42	+4.53%
1970 CE	12,137.94	+5.87%
1965 CE	9,126.98	+5.89%
1960 CE	6,855.25	+4.77%
1955 CE	5,430.44	+5.88%
1950 CE	4,081.81	+3.12%
1940 CE	3,001.36	+2.91%
1930 CE	2,253.81	+1.4%
1925 CE	2,102.88	+3.94%
1920 CE	1,733.67	+2.29%
1900 CE	1,102.96	+2.69%
1875 CE	568.08	+1.84%
1850 CE	359.90	+1.45%
1800 CE	175.24	+0.62%
1750 CE	128.51	+0.51%
1700 CE	99.80	+0.40%
1650 CE	81.74	+0.12%
1600 CE	77.01	+0.27%
1500 CE	58.67	+0.27%
1400 CE	44.92	+0.21%
1350 CE	40.50	+0.47%
1300 CE	32.09	-0.21%
1250 CE	35.58	-0.10%
1200 CE	37.44	-0.056%
1100 CE	39.60	+0.11%
1000 CE	35.31	+0.11%
900 CE	31.68	+0.23%
800 CE	25.23	+0.074%
700 CE	23.44	+0.12%
600 CE	20.86	+0.046%
500 CE	19.92	+0.077%
400 CE	18.44	+0.056%
350 CE	17.93	-0.022%
200 CE	18.54	+0.031%
14 CE	17.50	-0.427%
1 CE	18.50	+0.042%
200 BCE	17.00	+0.030%
400 BCE	16.02	+0.155%
500 BCE	13.72	+0.115%
800 BCE	9.72	+0.213%
1000 BCE	6.35	+0.063%
1600 BCE	4.36	+0.092%
2000 BCE	3.02	+0.064%
3000 BCE	1.59	+0.073%
4000 BCE	0.77	+0.041%
5000 BCE	0.51	+0.0057%
8000 BCE	0.43	+0.0075%
10,000 BCE	0.37	+0.0012%
25,000 BCE	0.31	+0.00045%
300,000 BCE	0.09	+0.00031%
1,000,000 BCE	0.01	–

== See also ==
- List of countries by GDP (nominal)
- List of countries by GDP (PPP)
- List of countries by real GDP growth rate
- World economy
- World population
