= Venture capital in the Czech Republic =

Venture capital in the Czech Republic refers to activity by private equity investors who finance companies in early stages of development in exchange for an ownership stake. The market's origins date to the early 1990s, when foreign funds began operating in the country following the transition to a market economy after the Velvet Revolution. From the mid-2010s, investment volumes grew, driven primarily by programmes of the European Investment Fund and an expanding domestic investor base. In 2023, Czech startups raised venture capital worth €173.1 million, placing the country fourth in Central and Eastern Europe by capital received. As a share of gross domestic product, Czech venture capital investment stood at approximately 0.07%, compared with a European average of 0.17%.

== History ==
=== Early phase (1990s) ===
The venture capital industry in the Czech Republic began to take shape within the political and economic transformation that followed the Velvet Revolution of 1989. As the privatisation of state enterprises began, foreign capital started entering the country.

Private equity and venture capital investment has been carried out in the Czech Republic since 1990. At the same time, the Western European and American venture capital market was experiencing a recession caused by a wave of bankruptcies following the collapse of leveraged buyouts in the 1980s. A recovery came in 1993, and American pension and investment funds began directing part of their portfolios towards European markets including Central and Eastern Europe. New European stock exchanges for smaller companies were opening simultaneously.

The first Czech private equity fund was founded in 1995 by Michal Nosek. In September 1997, seven venture capital funds were operating in the country, approximately five of which were actively investing; total annual investment volume was estimated at several hundred million crowns. Fond rizikového kapitálu, s.r.o. achieved average annual returns of approximately 50% through 2000. Nosek stated in a 1997 interview that the market faced structural constraints – a small domestic market, direct competition from foreign direct investment, and the absence of an institutional investor base.

The Czech Private Equity and Venture Capital Association (CVCA), a trade body representing PE/VC funds operating in the country, was founded in 1997 and became a member of Invest Europe, the pan-European trade association.

=== Development (2000–2015) ===
In 2003, approximately twenty venture capital funds were operating in the Czech Republic, while transaction volumes remained low – on the order of dozens of deals per year worth tens to hundreds of millions of crowns. CVCA members carried out more than 100 investments totalling €2.4 billion between 1990 and 2009; the largest share of invested funds went to the IT, telecommunications and internet sector.

The European Bank for Reconstruction and Development (EBRD) ceased its direct investment activities in the Czech Republic in 2007.

Credo Ventures was founded in 2009 by Ondřej Bartoš, focused on early-stage technology companies in Central and Eastern Europe.

Venture capital transaction volumes declined between 2012 and 2015 to their lowest level since the late 1990s. In December 2011, the Ministry of Industry and Trade announced two market support programmes. The Seed Fund (formally Český rozvojový, uzavřený investiční fond), backed by CZK 660 million from EU structural funds, was structured as a co-investment instrument – private investors were required to contribute at least 30% of each project. A complementary initiative, CzechEkoSystem, operated by CzechInvest with a budget of CZK 206 million, was tasked with identifying promising companies and supporting the entrepreneurial ecosystem.

Structural barriers to sector development included legislative restrictions on pension funds and insurance companies investing via PE/VC, minimum fund investment tickets exceeding one million euros that excluded early-stage financing, and an underdeveloped business angel network. Funds also faced legislative barriers to establishing PE/VC funds on Czech territory, meaning many were domiciled abroad and operated under foreign legal systems.

=== Growth and maturation (2016–present) ===
In January 2017, the EIF, in cooperation with Czech authorities, launched the Czech ESIF Fund of Funds – a €50 million instrument targeting equity investments in early-stage companies. Across all its instruments, the EIF has committed approximately €300 million to 15 Czech equity funds.

The EBRD returned to the country in 2021 after a fourteen-year absence. Total venture capital investment volume reached a record €120 million in 2022, and Czech startups achieved the status of the country's first two unicorns in that year and the preceding one.

In March 2023, the EIF and the Ministry of Industry and Trade launched the RRF Czech Republic Fund of Funds – a €55 million initiative financed from the EU's Recovery and Resilience Facility – targeting three specialised funds: a pre-seed co-investment instrument, a fintech fund focused on distributed ledger technologies, and a technology transfer fund to commercialise artificial intelligence research outputs from Czech universities. Czech startups raised €173.1 million in 2023 – the fourth-highest figure in Central and Eastern Europe – while total private and venture capital volume across Central and Eastern Europe reached €2.83 billion in 2024.

== Czech unicorns ==
Between 2021 and 2023, three Czech technology companies achieved valuations exceeding one billion dollars (unicorn).

Rohlik Group, an online grocery delivery platform founded by Tomáš Čupr, closed a Series C round of €100 million led by Index Ventures in July 2021.

Productboard, a Prague-based product management software company, closed a Series C round of $72 million in April 2021 led by Tiger Global Management with participation from Index Ventures, Kleiner Perkins, Sequoia Capital and Bessemer Venture Partners. A valuation exceeding one billion dollars was reached in 2022.

Prague-based Mews, a hotel management platform, closed a round of $220 million in early 2023 with participation from Goldman Sachs and Kinnevik.

== Major investors ==
=== Domestic funds ===
Credo Ventures was founded in 2009, focusing on pre-seed and seed investments in technology companies across Central and Eastern Europe with cheques of $1 - 5 million. In March 2026, the firm closed the first closing of its fifth fund, Credo Stage 5, at $88 million. Its portfolio across five funds includes over 100 companies, among them UiPath and ElevenLabs, both backed at the pre-seed stage.

KAYA VC was founded in Prague in 2010 under the name Enern, initially focused on renewable energy, before redirecting its strategy to early-stage technology startups in Central and Eastern Europe. In June 2025, the fund closed the first closing of its fifth fund at €70 million; investments include Rohlik Group, Booksy, DocPlanner and Better Stack.

Presto Ventures was founded in 2016 by Přemysl Rubeš in Prague as a fund focused on B2B technology startups. In June 2024, Presto Ventures, in cooperation with industrial group Czechoslovak Group (CSG) of Michal Strnad, launched the Presto Tech Horizons fund with a target size of €150 million, focused on dual-use technologies, defence and security technologies from NATO countries and their allies. Presto Ventures' portfolio includes Keboola, IP Fabric and CloudTalk.

Rockaway Capital, led by Jakub Havrlanta, invests in companies in the e-commerce, tourism, media and financial services sectors across Central and Eastern Europe; the Rockaway Ventures fund launched in 2022 targeted €100 million.

Miton invests exclusively proprietary capital without external limited partners in e-commerce, artificial intelligence and digital consumer companies; its portfolio includes Rohlik Group and Rossum.

Other active funds as of 2024 include J&T Ventures, Orbit Capital, Purple Ventures, Impulse Ventures, Lighthouse Ventures, Reflex Capital, Inven Capital and Tilia Impact Ventures.

=== International participation ===
Foreign investors have participated in Czech investment rounds. Index Ventures led Rohlik Group's €100 million round in July 2021. Tiger Global Management led Productboard's $72 million Series C in the same year. Goldman Sachs and Kinnevik participated in Mews's $220 million round in 2023.

== Ecosystem ==
The Czech Private Equity and Venture Capital Association (CVCA) represents PE/VC funds operating in the Czech Republic as full members, together with associated members from the legal, advisory, banking and insurance sectors. It is a member of Invest Europe. The CVCA publishes an annual market report jointly with Deloitte and, in cooperation with the Slovak SLOVCA, awards prizes for PE/VC transactions and fund managers in the Czech and Slovak markets.

The European Investment Fund (EIF), through programmes linked to EU structural and recovery funds, has committed approximately €300 million to 15 Czech equity funds. The 2017 Czech ESIF Fund of Funds (€50 million) and the 2023 RRF Czech Republic Fund of Funds (€55 million) are the two main instruments of this engagement.

Prague and Brno are the main centres of the Czech startup ecosystem. Universities with ties to the industry include the Czech Technical University in Prague, Charles University and Masaryk University.

== Challenges and outlook ==
At approximately 0.07% of GDP, Czech venture capital investment is below the European average of 0.17%. Repeatedly cited structural constraints include a small domestic market, a shallow pool of institutional limited partners, and a tendency for startups to relocate their legal domicile abroad when scaling.

== See also ==
- Venture capital in Poland
- European Investment Fund
- Economy of the Czech Republic
