= Economy of the Czech Republic =

Economy of Czech Republic
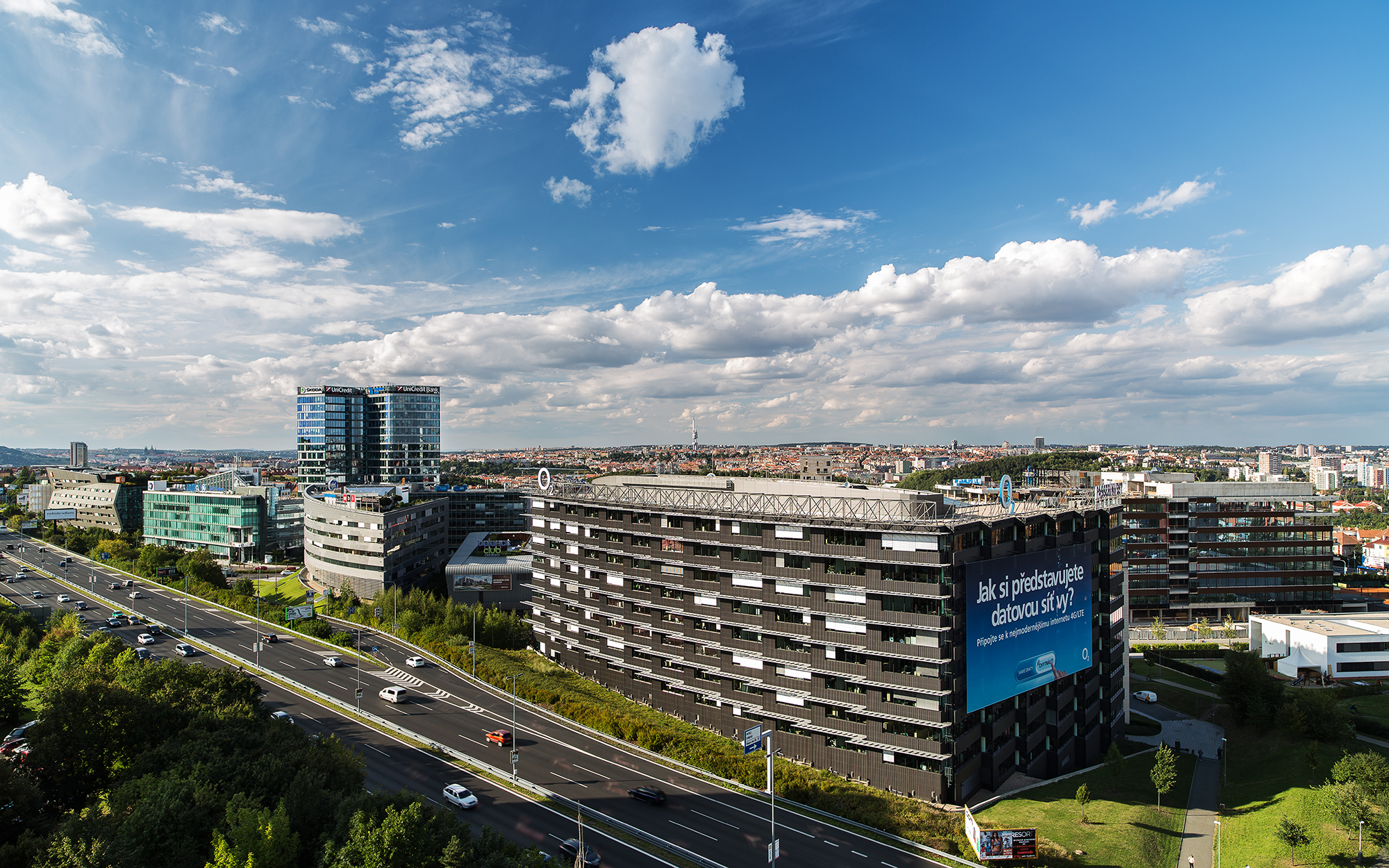
- Business district in Prague
- Currency: Czech koruna (CZK)
- Fiscal year: Calendar year
- Trade organisations: EU, EEA, WTO, OECD
- Country group: Advanced economy; High-income economy

Statistics
- Population: ▲10,915,839 (31 December 2025)
- GDP: ▲$427.95 billion (nominal, 2026); ▲$692.166 billion (PPP, 2025 est.)
- GDP rank: 42nd (nominal, 2025); 46th (PPP, 2025)
- GDP growth: ▲2.6% (2025); 1.9% (2026 forecast)
- GDP per capita: ▲$39,614 (nominal, 2026); ▲$64.07 (PPP, 2026)
- GDP per capita rank: 35th (nominal, 2026); 32th (PPP, 2026)
- GDP by sector: Agriculture: 2.1%; Industry: 25.6%; Construction: 5.8%; Services: 66.5%; (2025; gross value added)
- Inflation (CPI): ▲2.5% (2025; annual average CPI)
- Base borrowing rate: 3.75% (two-week repo; since 19 June 2026)
- Population below national poverty line: ▲9.6% at risk of poverty (2025); 11.5% at risk of poverty or social exclusion (2025)
- Gini coefficient: ▼23.7 (2024)
- Human Development Index: ▲0.915, very high (2023; 29th); 0.867, very high IHDI (2023; 15th)
- Corruption Perceptions Index: ▲59/100 (2025)
- Labour force: ▲5.404 million (2025; LFS); Employment rate: ▲82.9% (ages 20–64; 2025)
- Unemployment: ▲2.8% (2025)
- Average gross salary: Monthly: Average: ▲CZK 51,966 (Q2 2026; preliminary); Median: ▲CZK 45,523 (Q4 2025)
- Main industries: Engineering; electronics; motor vehicles; metallurgy; machinery; chemicals; pharmaceuticals

External
- Exports: ▲US$283.87 billion (goods, 2025)
- Export goods: Machinery; transport equipment; electronics; chemicals
- Main export partners: EU 76.70%; Germany 30%; Slovakia 7.35%; Poland 6.63%; France 4.54%; Austria 4.07%; United Kingdom 4.43%; United States 2.97%; China 1.66%; Turkey 1.59%; Switzerland 1.41%
- Imports: ▲US$254.14 billion (goods, 2025)
- Import goods: Machinery and components; fuels; chemicals; consumer goods
- Main import partners: EU 62.60%; Germany 22.2%; Poland 9.95%; Slovakia 5.36%; Italy 3.81%; France 3.07%; China 14.8%; United States 2.29%; South Korea 1.73%; Vietnam 1.57%; Japan 1.55%
- FDI stock: Inward: US$222.1 billion; Outward: US$78.0 billion; (end-2024 stocks)
- Current account: ▼ +0.7% of GDP (2025)
- Gross external debt: CZK 5.6828 trillion (31 December 2025)
- Net international investment position: ▼ −9.8% of GDP (end-2025)

Public finance
- Government debt: ▲44.2% of GDP (2025); ▲CZK 3.7873 trillion
- Foreign reserves: CZK 3.6394 trillion (31 December 2025)
- Budget balance: ▼ −2.2% of GDP (2025; general government); ▲CZK 185.5 billion deficit
- Credit rating: Moody's: Aa3; S&P: AA−; Fitch: AA−; (long-term foreign currency; 29 September 2026)
- All values, unless otherwise stated, are in US dollars.

The Czech Republic has a developed export-oriented social market economy. It is based in services, manufacturing, and innovation that maintains a high-income welfare state and the European social model. The Czech Republic participates in the European Single Market as a member of the European Union, and is therefore a part of the economy of the European Union. It uses its own currency, the Czech koruna, instead of the euro. It is a member of the Organisation for Economic Co-operation and Development (OECD). The Czech Republic ranks 16th in inequality-adjusted human development and 24th in World Bank Human Capital Index, ahead of countries such as the United States, the United Kingdom or France. The Czech Republic ranks 7th – 10th among the world’s most diversified economies in the Economic Complexity Index.

The industry sector accounts for 37% of the economy, while services account for 61% and agriculture for 2%. The principal industries are high tech engineering, electronics and machine-building, steel production, transportation equipment (automotive, rail and aerospace industry), chemicals, advanced materials and pharmaceuticals. The major services are research and development, ICT and software development, nanotechnology and life sciences. Its main agricultural products are cereals, vegetable oils and hops.

As of 2023, the Czech GDP per capita at purchasing power parity is $50,961 and 698,706 Czech crowns ($31,368) at nominal value. As of September 2021, the unemployment rate in the Czech Republic was the lowest in the EU at 2.6%, and the poverty rate is the second lowest of OECD members, following Denmark. The Czech Republic ranks 21st in the Index of Economic Freedom (ranked behind Chile), 32nd in the Global Innovation Index (ranked behind Portugal), 32nd in the Global Competitiveness Report, 41st in the ease of doing business index and 25th in the Global Enabling Trade Report (ranked behind Canada). The largest trading partner for both export and import is Germany, followed by other members of the EU. The Czech Republic has a highly diverse economy that ranks 7th in the 2019 Economic Complexity Index.

== History ==
=== From industrialisation to communism (1800-1989) ===
The Czech lands were among the first industrialized countries in continental Europe during the German Confederation era. The Czech industrial tradition dates back to the 19th century, when the Lands of the Bohemian Crown were the economic and industrial heartland of the Austrian Empire and later the Austrian side of Austria-Hungary. The Czech lands produced a majority (about 70%) of all industrial goods in the Empire, some of which were almost monopolistic.

After the First World War, the Austrian-Hungarian Empire collapsed and independent Czechoslovakia was created. Czechoslovakia had way too big industrial production for a small internal market and it missed the big market of the former Empire. The Czechoslovak crown was introduced in April 1919 at a 1:1 ratio to the Austro-Hungarian currency, it became one of the most stable currencies in Europe. It is a widespread myth among Czechs that the First Republic belonged to the 10 most developed economies of the world. In fact it had the 14th highest GDP per capita in the world. The Czech part (without Slovakia and Transcarpathia) had a similar GDP per capita in the 1920s to Germany and Belgium, which was higher than that of the crisis-struck Austrian First Republic.

The consequences of the 1938 Munich Agreement and subsequent Nazi Germany occupation were disastrous for the economy. After the occupation and forced subordination of the economy to Nazi German economic interests, the crown was officially pegged to the mark at a ratio of 1:10, even though the unofficial exchange rate was 1 to 6-7 and Germans immediately started buying Czech goods in large quantities.

After the World War II and the Communist Coup d'état were all the economies of the socialist countries tightly linked to that of the Soviet Union, in accordance with Stalin's development policy of planned interdependence. Czechoslovakia was the most prosperous country in the Eastern Bloc, however it was during the decades overtaken not only by Austria or Finland but also Southern European economies like that of Italy, Spain or Greece.

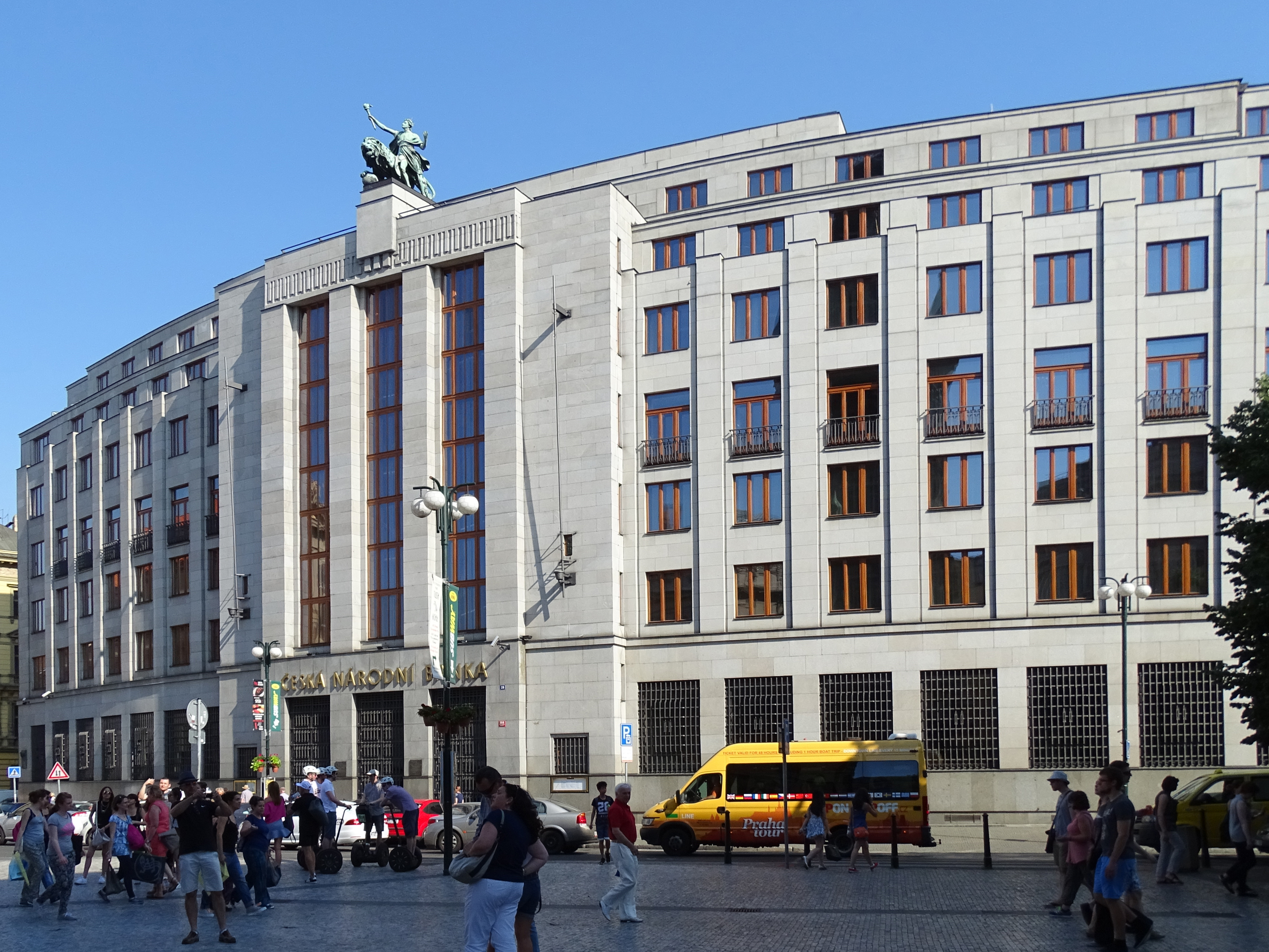
Czech National Bank headquarters in Prague

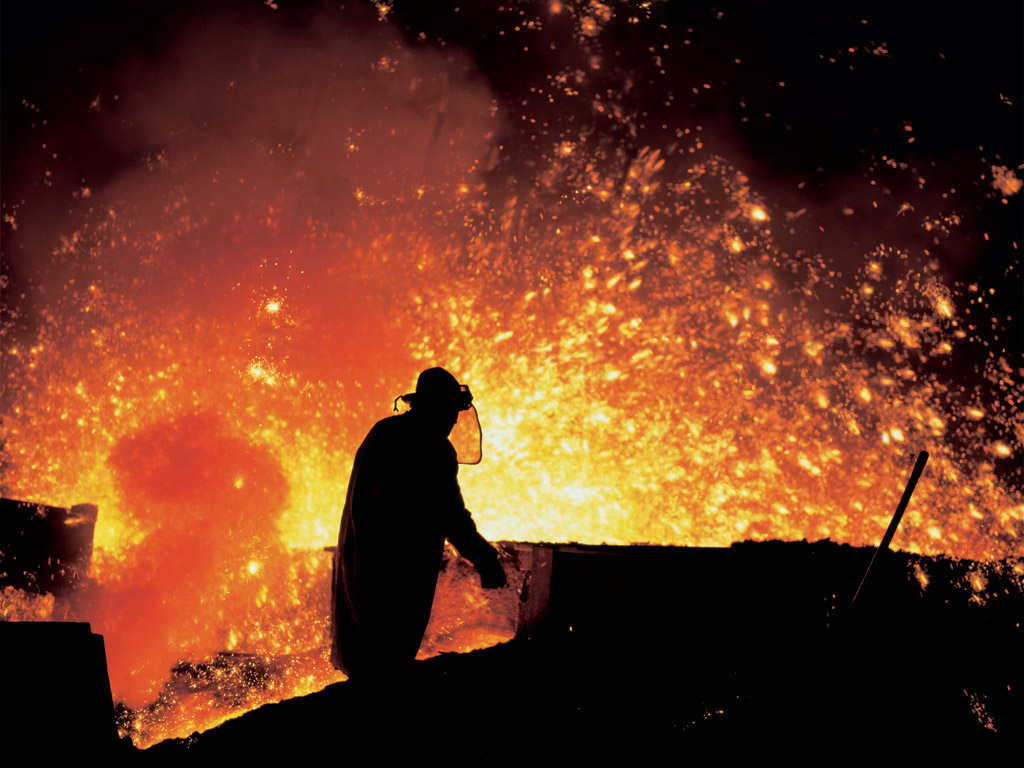
Heavy industry such as steelmaking is a traditional part of the Czech economy.

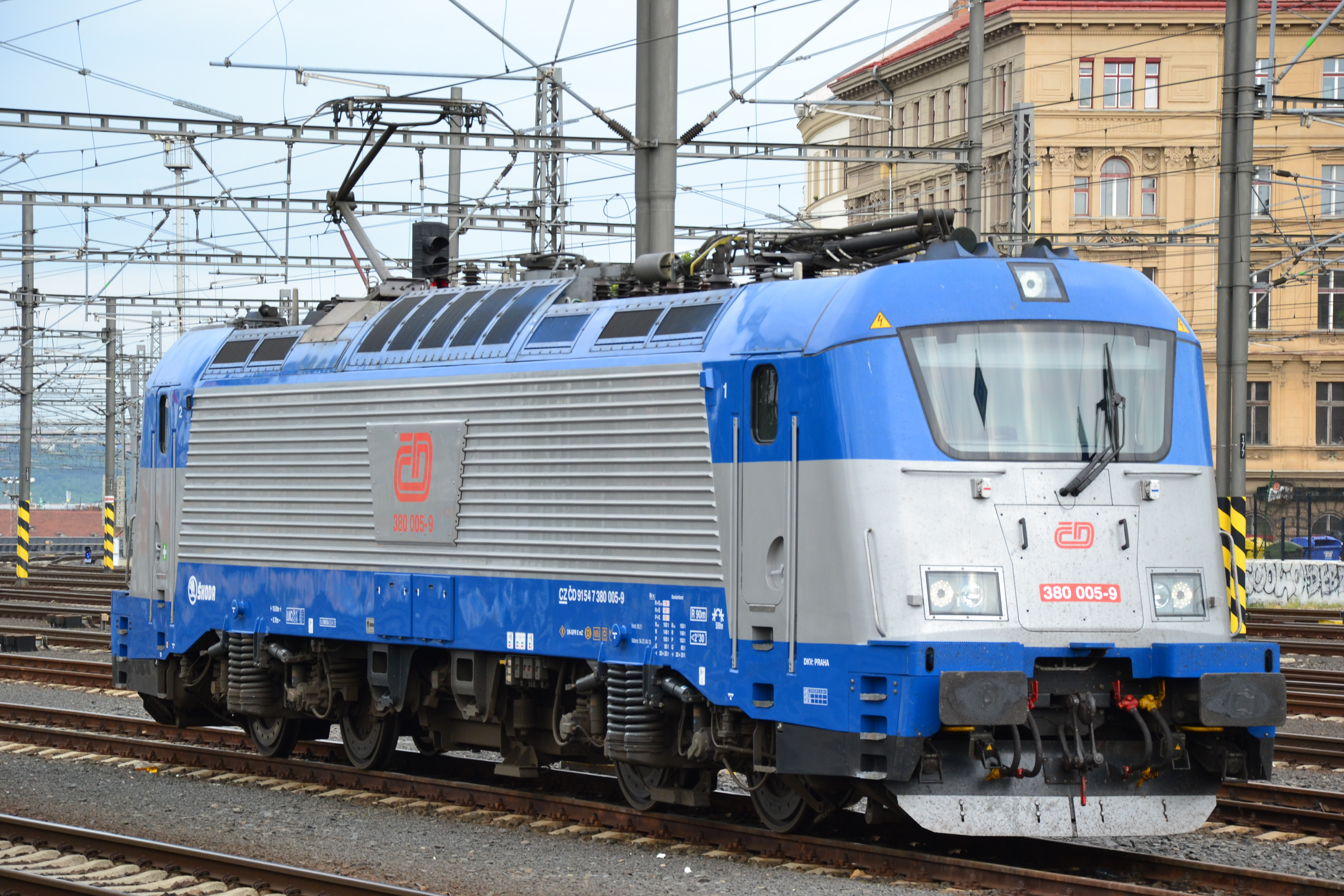
Transportation equipment, machinery manufacturing and engineering are essential for the Czech economy.

=== 1989–1995 ===
The "Velvet Revolution" in 1989, offered a chance for profound and sustained political and economic reform. With the disintegration of the communist economic alliance in 1991, Czech manufacturers lost their traditional markets among former communist countries in the east. Signs of economic resurgence began to appear in the wake of the shock therapy that the International Monetary Fund (IMF) labelled the "big bang" of January 1991. Since then, consistent liberalization and astute economic management has led to the removal of 95% of all price controls, low unemployment, a positive balance of payments position, a stable exchange rate, a shift of exports from former communist economic bloc markets to Western Europe, and relatively low foreign debt. Inflation has been higher than in some other countries – mostly in the 10% range – and the government has run consistent modest budget deficits.

Two government priorities have been strict fiscal policies and creating a good climate for incoming investment in the republic. Following a series of currency devaluations, the crown has remained stable in relation to the US dollar. The Czech crown became fully convertible for most business purposes in late 1995.

In order to stimulate the economy and attract foreign partners, the government has revamped the legal and administrative structure governing investment. With the breakup of the Soviet Union, the country, till that point highly dependent on exports to the USSR, had to make a radical shift in economic outlook: away from the East, and towards the West. This necessitated the restructuring of existing banking and telecommunications facilities, as well as adjusting commercial laws and practices to fit Western standards. Further minimizing reliance on a single major partner, successive Czech governments have welcomed U.S. investment (amongst others) as a counterbalance to the strong economic influence of Western European partners, especially of their powerful neighbour, Germany. Although foreign direct investment (FDI) runs in uneven cycles, with a 12.9% share of total FDI between 1990 and March 1998, the U.S. was the third-largest foreign investor in the Czech economy, behind Germany and the Netherlands.

Czech high export profile has made it tightly woven into both European and global markets and supply chains, which has contributed to its relatively low unemployment. A large part of the Czech industrial economy is tied to German demand, with 33% of its exported goods going to its neighbor to the northwest. Foreign direct investment in the 1990s from Germany, Austria, and the Netherlands helped build the country's automotive industry and provided a strong base for the rest of the economy. This foreign investment is further reflected in the fact that upwards of 38% of entire sectors of the Czech economy are owned by foreign-owned corporations. The large stake of foreign ownership has created concerns over dependency on foreign entities and has left the Czech economy prone to shocks in foreign demand or global supply disruptions. This openness has supported growth but also increased vulnerability.

The country boasts a flourishing consumer production sector and has privatized most state-owned heavy industries through the voucher privatization system. Under the system, every citizen was given the opportunity to buy, for a moderate price, a book of vouchers that represents potential shares in any state-owned company. The voucher holders could then invest their vouchers, increasing the capital base of the chosen company, and creating a nation of citizen share-holders. This is in contrast to Russian privatization, which consisted of sales of communal assets to private companies rather than share-transfer to citizens. The effect of this policy has been dramatic. Under communism, state ownership of businesses was estimated to be 97%. Privatization through restitution of real estate to the former owners was largely completed in 1992. By 1998, more than 80% of enterprises were in private hands. Now completed, the program has made Czechs, who own shares of each of the Czech companies, one of the highest per-capita share owners in the world. On the other hand, by the public is the voucher privatisation seen mostly as unfair and source of corruption.

=== 1995–2000 ===
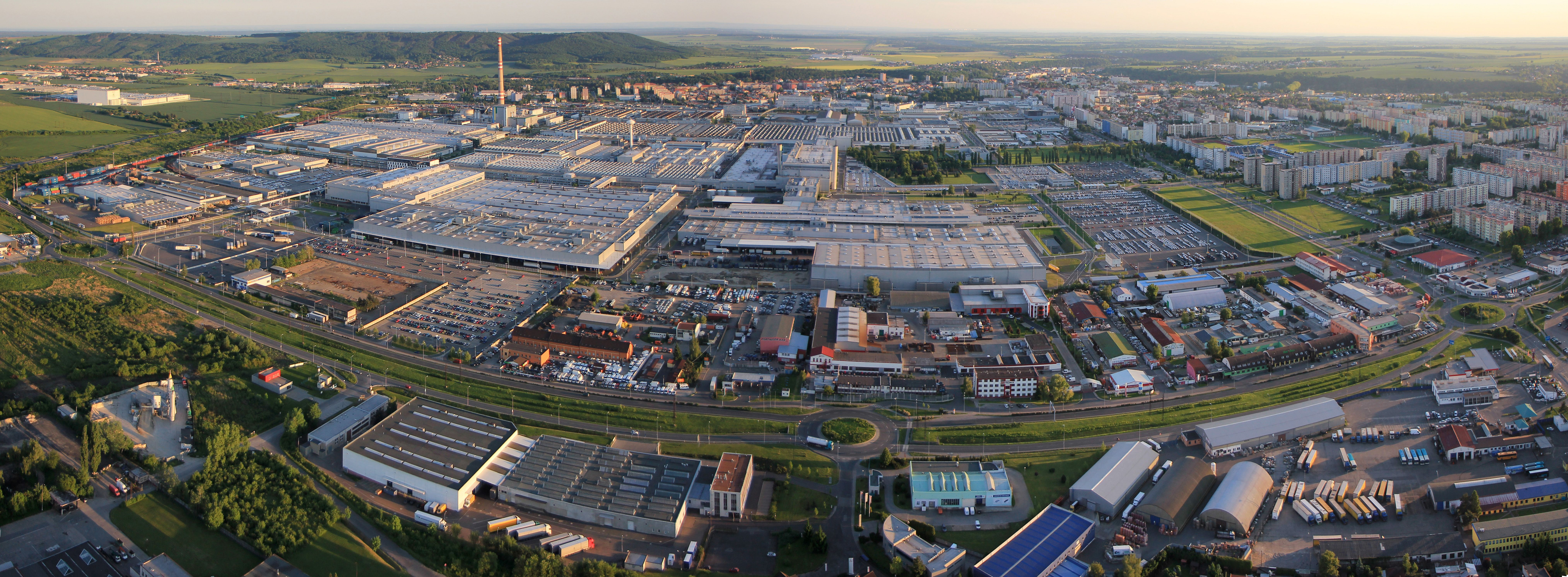
Škoda Auto is the largest automobile manufacturer in the Czech Republic.

The country's economic transformation was far from complete. Political and financial crises in 1997 shattered the Czech Republic's image as one of the most stable and prosperous of post-Communist states. Delays in enterprise restructuring and failure to develop a well-functioning capital market played major roles in Czech economic troubles, which culminated in a currency crisis in May. The formerly pegged currency was forced into a floating system as investors sold their Korunas faster than the government could buy them. This followed a worldwide trend to divest from developing countries that year. Investors also worried the republic's economic transformation was far from complete. Another complicating factor was the current account deficit, which reached nearly 8% of GDP.

In response to the crisis, two austerity packages were introduced later in the spring (called vernacularly "The Packages"), which cut government spending by 2.5% of GDP. Growth dropped to 0.3% in 1997, −2.3% in 1998, and −0.5% in 1999. The government established a restructuring agency in 1999 and launched a revitalization program – to spur the sale of firms to foreign companies. Key priorities included accelerating legislative convergence with EU norms, restructuring enterprises, and privatising banks and utilities. The economy, fueled by increased export growth and investment, was expected to recover by 2000.

=== 2000–2005 ===
Growth in 2000–05 was supported by exports to the EU, primarily to Germany, and a strong recovery of foreign and domestic investment. Domestic demand is playing an ever more important role in underpinning growth as interest rates drop and the availability of credit cards and mortgages increases. Current account deficits of around 5% of GDP are beginning to decline as demand for Czech products in the European Union increases. Inflation is under control. Recent accession to the EU gives further impetus and direction to structural reform. In early 2004 the government passed increases in the Value Added Tax (VAT) and tightened eligibility for social benefits with the intention to bring the public finance gap down to 4% of GDP by 2006, but more difficult pension and healthcare reforms will have to wait until after the next elections. Privatization of the state-owned telecommunications firm Český Telecom took place in 2005. Intensified restructuring among large enterprises, improvements in the financial sector, and effective use of available EU funds should strengthen output growth.

=== 2005–2010 ===
Growth continued in the first years of the EU membership. The credit portion of the 2008 financial crisis did not affect the Czech Republic much, mostly due to its stable banking sector which has learned its lessons during a smaller crisis in the late 1990s and became much more cautious. As a fraction of the GDP, the Czech public debt is among the smallest ones in Central and Eastern Europe. Moreover, unlike many other post-communist countries, an overwhelming majority of the household debt – over 99% – is denominated in the local Czech currency. That's why the country wasn't affected by the shrunken money supply in the U.S. dollars.

However, as a large exporter, the economy was sensitive to the decrease of the demand in Germany and other trading partners. In the middle of 2009, the annual drop of the GDP for 2009 was estimated around 3% or 4.3%, a relatively modest decrease. The impact of the economic crisis may have been limited by the existence of the national currency that temporarily weakened in H1 of 2009, simplifying the life of the exporters. The Czech Republic has a well-educated population and a densely developed infrastructure.

=== 2010–2019 ===
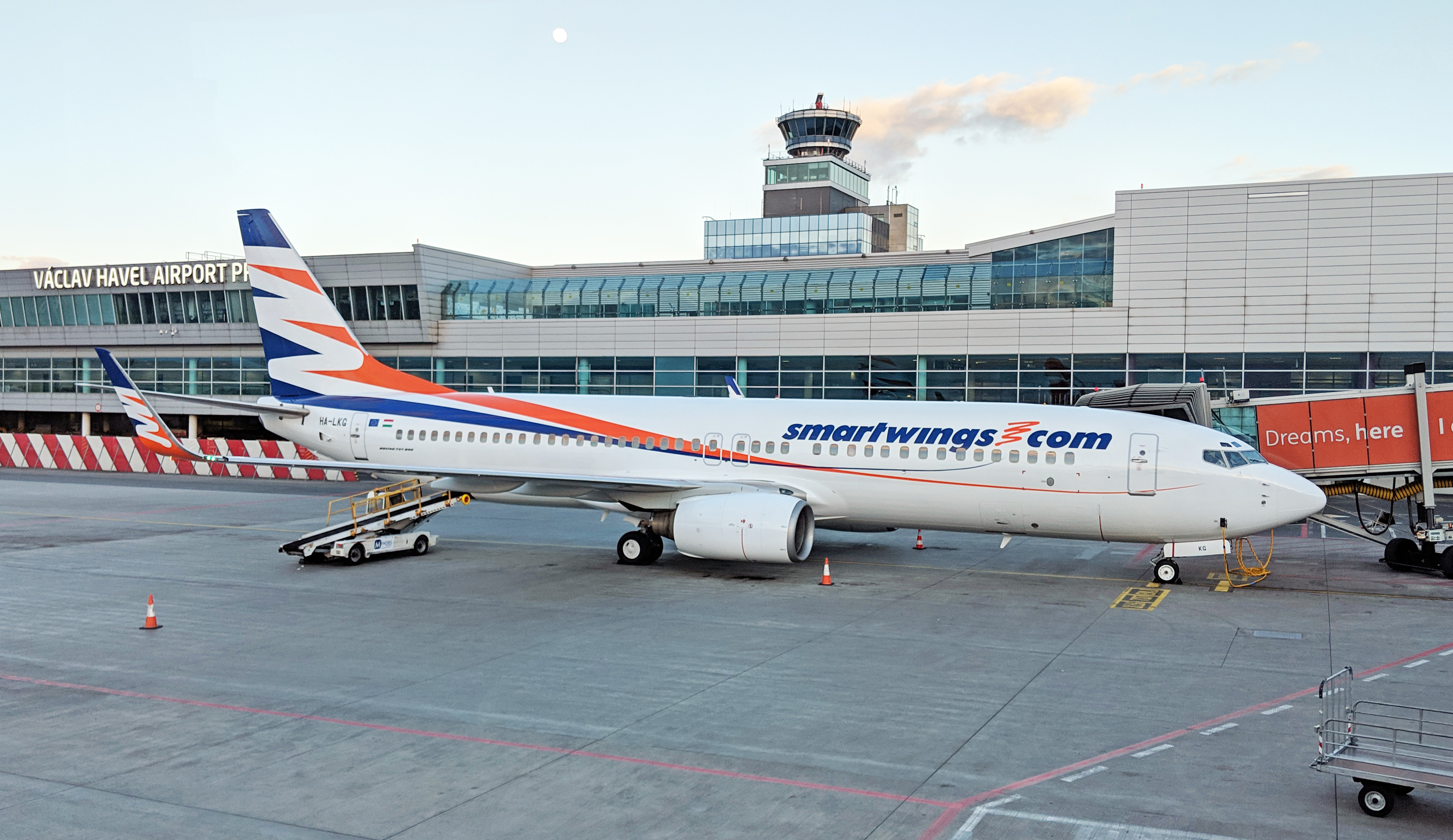
Smartwings is the major Czech airline holding company with subsidies including the Czech Airlines.

Due to the Great Recession, Czech Republic was in stagnation or decreasing of GDP. Some commenters and economists criticising fiscally conservative policy of Petr Nečas' right-wing government, especially criticising ex-minister of finance, Miroslav Kalousek. Miroslav Kalousek in a 2008 interview, as minister of finance in the center-right government of Mirek Topolánek, said "Czech Republic will not suffer by financial crisis". In September 2008, Miroslav Kalousek formed state budget with projection of 5% GDP increase in 2009. In 2009 and 2010, Czech Republic suffered strong economical crisis and GDP decreased by 4,5%. From 2009 to 2012, Czech Republic suffered highest state budget deficits in history of independent Czech Republic. From 2008 to 2012, the public debt of Czech Republic increased by 18,9%. Most decrease of industrial output was in construction industry (-25% in 2009, -15,5% in 2013). From 4Q 2009 to 1Q 2013, GDP decreased by 7,8%.

In 2012, Czech government increased VAT. Basic VAT was increased from 20% in 2012 to 21% in 2013 and reduced VAT increased from 14% to 15% in 2013. Small enterprises sales decreased by 21% from 2012 to 2013 as result of increasing VAT. Patria.cz predicting sales stagnation and mild increase in 2013. Another problem is foreign trade. The Czech Republic is considered an export economy (the Czech Republic has strong machinery and automobile industries), however in 2013, foreign trade rapidly decreased which led to many other problems and increase of state budget deficit. In 2013, Czech National Bank, central bank, implemented controversial monetary step. To increase export and employment, CNB wilfully deflated Czech Crown (CZK), which inflation increased from 0.2% in November 2013, to 1.3% in 1Q 2014.

In 2014, GDP in the Czech Republic increased by 2% and is predicted to increase by 2.7% in 2015. In 2015, Czech Republic's economy grew by 4,2% and it's the fastest growing economy in the European Union. On 29 May 2015, it was announced that growth of the Czech economy has increased from calculated 3,9% to 4,2%.

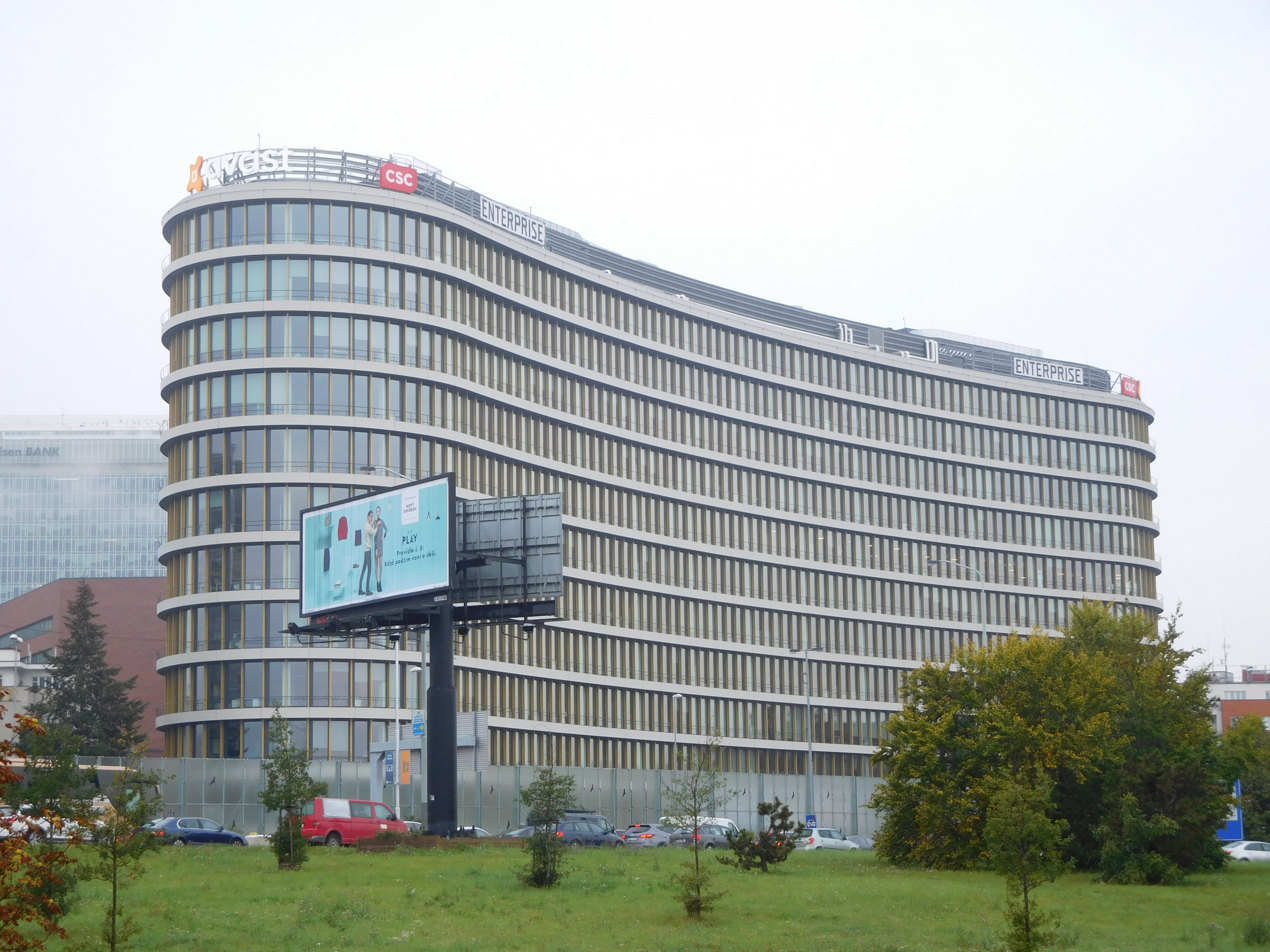
Cybersecurity software company Avast had its IPO on the Prague Stock Exchange and the London Stock Exchange in 2018. The information and communications technology (ICT) and software development is a major sector of the Czech economy.

In August 2015, Czech GDP growth was 4.4%, making the Czech economy the highest growing in Europe. On 9 November 2015, unemployment in the Czech Republic was at 5.9%, the lowest number since February 2009. On the other hand, the economy suffers from dividends being paid to the foreign owners of Czech companies (in 2016 worth CZK 289 billion). It is seen as a hurdle to catching up with the Western European economies and as a reason for salaries being only a third of neighbouring Germany or Austria. In 2019 it was described by The Guardian as "one of Europe's most flourishing economies"

=== 2020-present ===
The worldwide COVID-19 pandemic in the early 2020s as well as the European energy crisis caused by the Russian full-scale invasion of Ukraine in 2022 hit the Czech economy hard. In 2023, the conservative German newspaper Die Welt called the Czech Republic "Europe's sick man" as it was the only country not to economically recover from the pandemic trap. Furthermore, the newspaper highlighting the danger of the Czech Republic being stuck in the middle-income trap, although it is labelled as high-income country by the World Bank since 2006.

In June 2026, the Purchasing Managers' Index (PMI) of the manufacturing sector stood at a high 53.9, which was mostly attributed to customer stockpiling and stronger demand conditions.

== Adoption of Euro and EU funds ==
Since its accession to the European Union in 2004, the Czech Republic has adopted the Economic and Monetary Union of the European Union and it is bound by the Treaty of Accession 2003 to adopt the Euro currency in the future.

Although the Czech Republic is economically well positioned to adopt the euro, there is no target date by the government for joining the ERM II or adopting the euro as the general public is against Euro adoption. The cabinet that was formed following the 2017 legislative election did not plan to proceed with euro adoption within its term, and this policy was continued by the succeeding cabinet formed after the 2021 Czech parliamentary election. However, in January 2024, President Petr Pavel called on the government to take concrete steps in adopting the euro.

The Czech Republic also receives €24.2bn between 2014 and 2020 from the European Structural and Investment Funds, however, this sum does not outweigh the amount of capital outflow of profits of foreign owned firms from the Czech Republic into other EU members, at which the funds are aimed to compensate for.

== Public policy ==
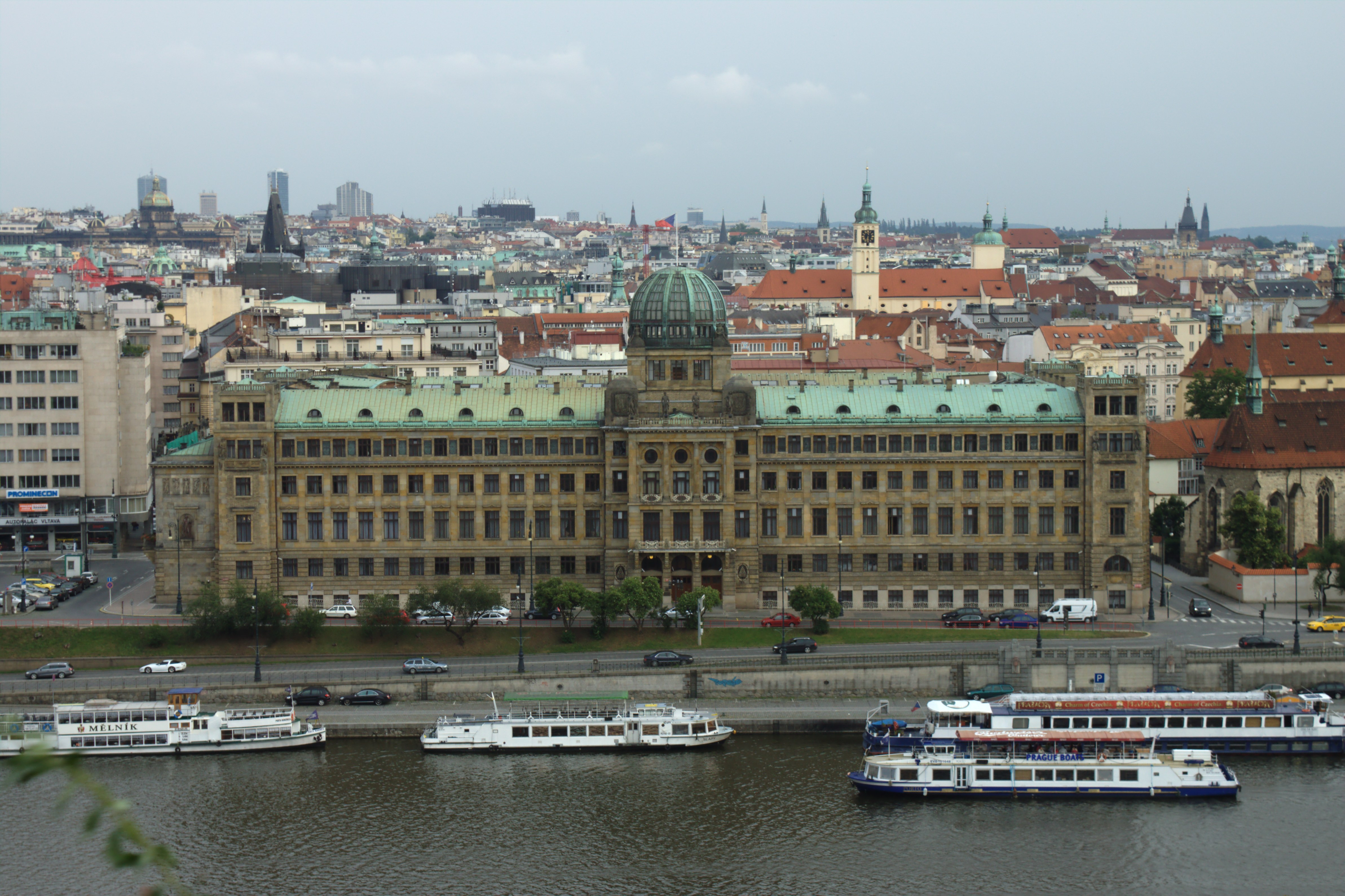
Ministry of Industry and Trade

Social policy in the Czech Republic addresses issues such as healthcare, education, social welfare, housing and pensions. While the Czech Republic's welfare and social system incorporate elements of the European social model, these policys also differ from this model in some respects.

The Czech Republic provides social assistance and benefits to vulnerable groups, including the elderly, disabled, and unemployed. The government also provides universal access to healthcare, and healthcare services are predominantly financed through compulsory health insurance contributions.

The Czech Republic has labor market regulations in place to protect workers' rights, ensure fair wages, and promote job security. However, labor market flexibility has increased in recent years, and the country has undertaken labor market reforms to enhance competitiveness.

As of 2016, the Czech Republic has the second lowest poverty rate of OECD members only behind Denmark. The Czech healthcare system ranks 13th in the 2016 Euro health consumer index.

== Prague Stock Exchange ==
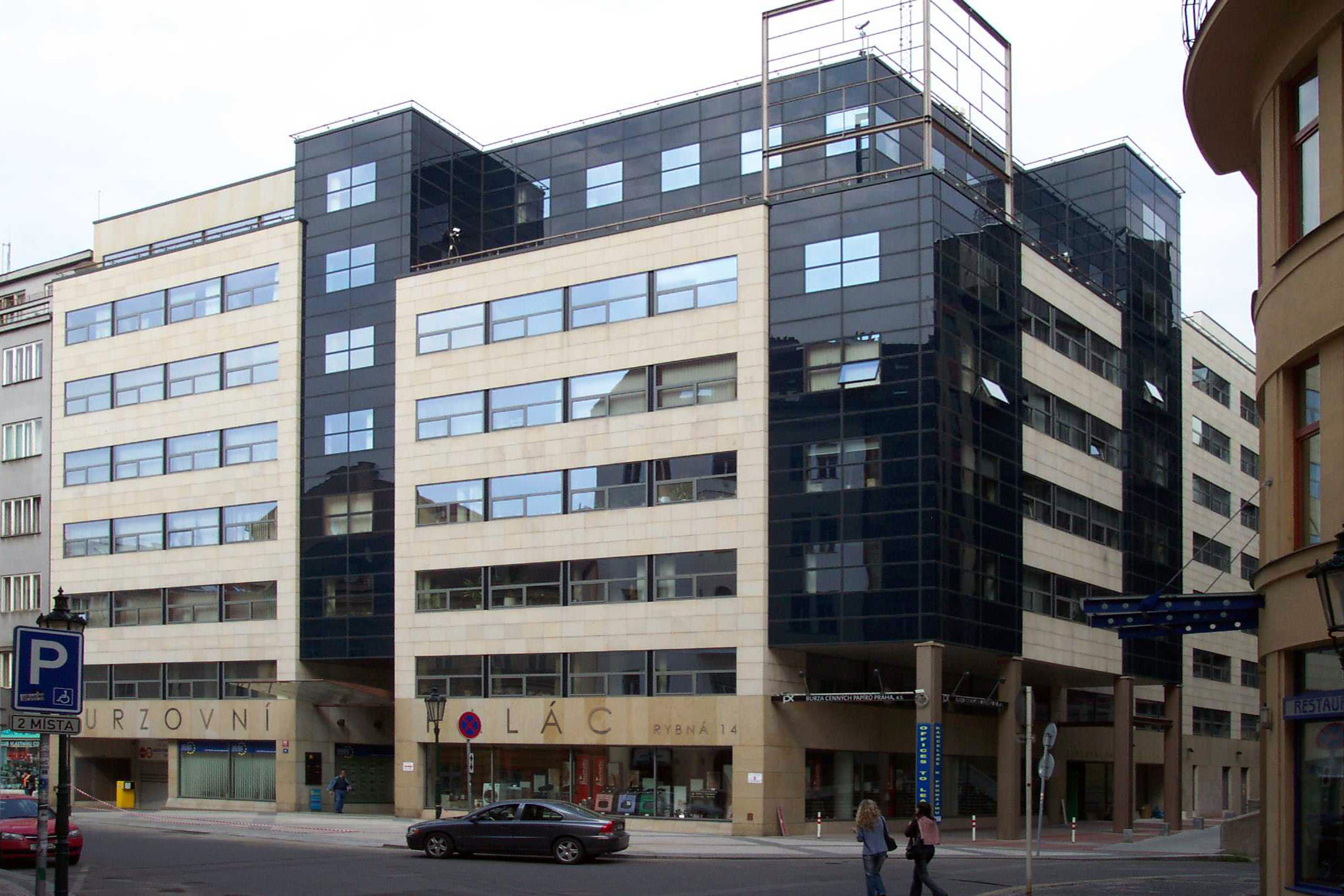
Prague Stock Exchange

The Czech economy also includes its capital market. In the case of the Czech Republic, it is the Prague Stock Exchange (PSE). The Prague Stock Exchange is governed by the Capital Market Business Act and the stock exchange rules it sets itself. All of its activities are controlled by the Czech National Bank. The Vienna Stock Exchange is the majority shareholder of the Prague Stock Exchange.

The Prague Stock Exchange has four main markets:

- Prime Market - a market for trading the largest and most prestigious issues of shares of Czech and foreign companies (the market capitalization of the company should exceed EUR 1 million)
- Standard Market - a market designed for trading large and prestigious issues of shares of Czech and foreign companies (Market Capitalization of the company should exceed EUR 1 million)
- Free Market - a market admits to trading both investment instruments for which the issuer has requested admission to trading and investment instruments traded on other world exchanges which are admitted to trading without the issuer's consent
- START Market - a market for smaller innovative companies (Small and Medium Enterprises) that wish to raise new capital or whose owners wish to partially or wholly exit their existing business to capitalise their existing operations

The largest issue traded on the Prague Stock Exchange is the energy company ČEZ. The main activity of ČEZ is the sale of electricity, mainly generated from its own sources, and the related provision of support services to the electricity system. Other large issues on the Prague Stock Exchange's Prime Market include banking houses - Komerční banka, MONETA Money Bank and the dual listing of the Austrian company Erste Group Bank, under which the local bank Česká spořitelna falls; as well as Colt CZ Group focusing mainly on the production of firearms (traded on the Prague Stock Exchange from 2020). From the Standard market, the largest issue is Philip Morris ČR, the largest manufacturer and seller of tobacco products in the Czech Republic. On the START market, we find, for example, e-commerce companies Bezvavlasy and Pilulka Lékárny, leather manufacturer and processor KARO Leather or urban furniture manufacturer mmcité.

== Energy ==
In Czech Republic energy production is diverse, with a mix of nuclear, coal, natural gas, and renewable sources. Nuclear power plays a significant role, while efforts to increase renewable usage are underway. The country aims to balance energy security, environmental concerns and sustainability in its energy policies. National objectives are to cut gas emissions by 40 percent by 2030 (compared with 1990) and to construct one nuclear reactor at the current Dukovany NPP site by late 2030s.

The Czech energy sector is largely built around two large nuclear plants and several smaller conventional coal power plants. Nuclear and coal power plants provide primarily baseload power at a high level of utilization, while gas fired units, reservoir hydro and pumped storage provide flexible generation. Recent rises in costs of carbon credits have made coal power plants almost financially inviable.

in 2022, Czech gross electricity production reached 78.8 terawatt-hours (TWh), while domestic consumption was around 60.4 TWh. The Czech energy mix was made up of 53.60 percent fossil fuels (47.50 percent lignite, 5.86 percent natural gas, etc.), 40.95 percent nuclear power, and 5.46 percent renewables (3.34 percent biomass, 1.47 percent solar, 0.63 percent water, etc.). The first green hydrogen electrolyzer powered by solar energy in the Czech Republic started in May 2023 with production capacity of about 100 kilograms per day / 8,000 kilograms of green hydrogen per year.

While the goal of EU funds is to support a sustainable low-carbon-emission economy and ensure energy security by utilizing alternative energies, the Czech approach is different. As described in the State Energy Policy, the future Czech energy mix will be primarily based on nuclear power with a goal of reaching 50 percent of the energy supply. Due to EU regulations, the share of coal energy will decrease but be largely replaced by both one (and possibly more) large nuclear reactors. The deployment of a series of small modular reactors is also under consideration by the Czechs. The share of alternative energies will grow but its potential for becoming the backbone of the energy sector is unclear.

== Statistical indicators ==
Real GPD per capita development the Czech Republic 1970 to 2018

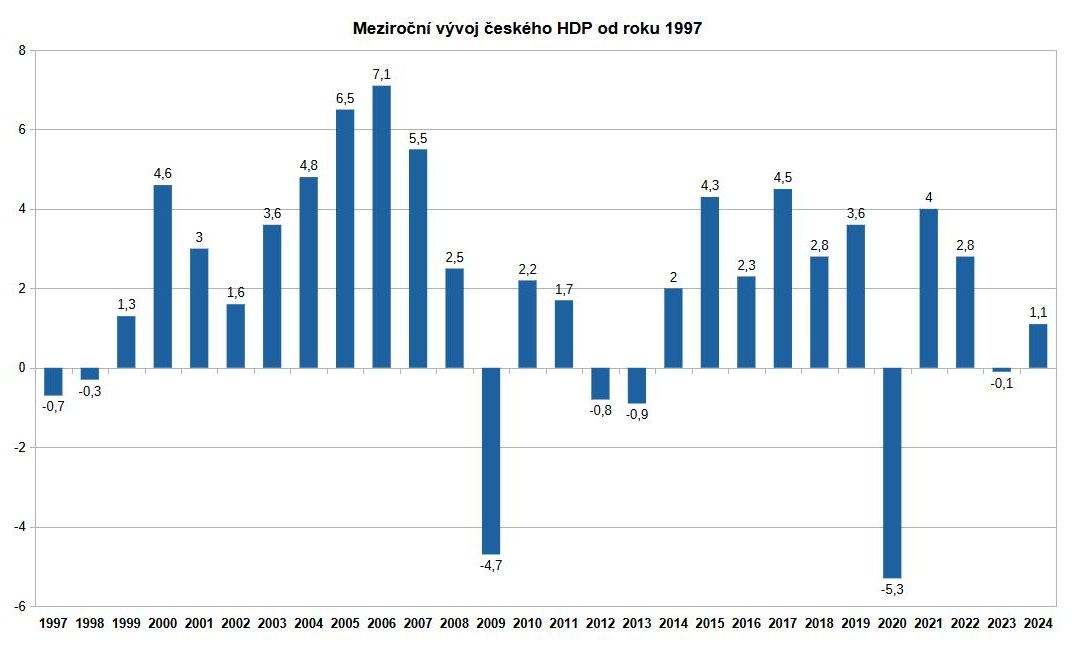
Percentage of GDP growth in the Czech Republic 1997–2019

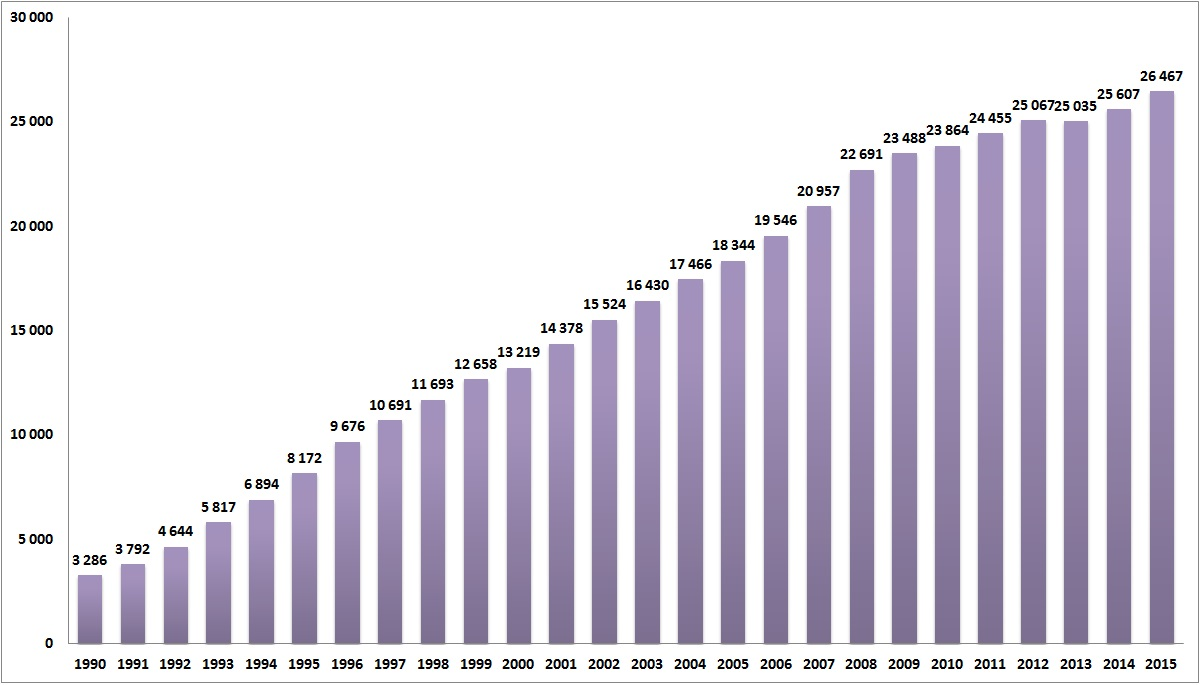
Average gross wage in the Czech Republic (1990–2015)

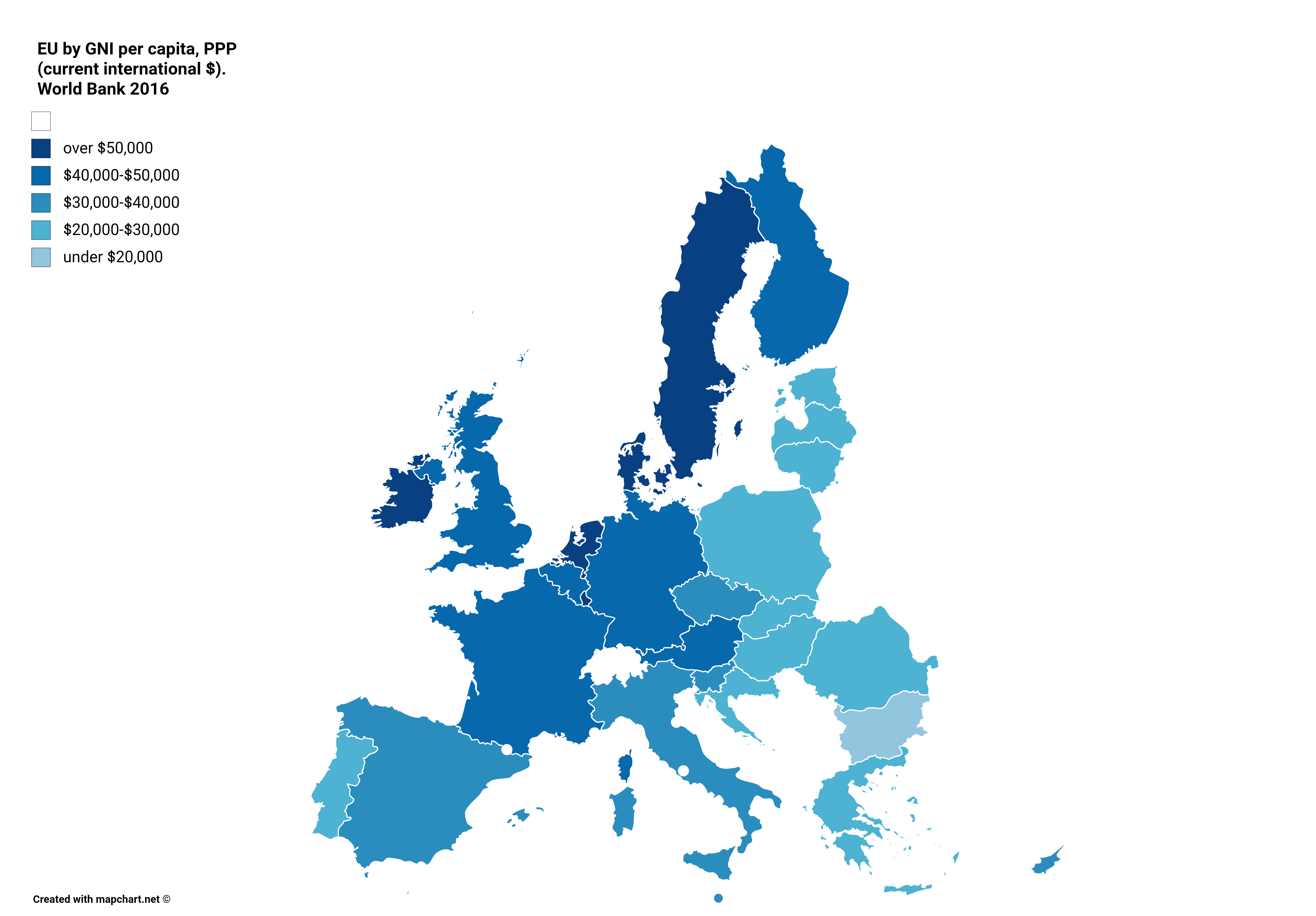
EU by GNI per capita, PPP (current international $). World Bank 2016

=== Development of main indicators ===
The following table shows the main economic indicators in 2015–2026. Inflation under 2% is in green.

Year	GDP (in bn. US$ PPP)	GDP per capita (in US$ PPP)	GDP (in bn. US$ nominal)	GDP growth (real)	Inflation rate (in Percent)	Unemployment (in Percent)	Government debt (in % of GDP)
2015	▲376.0	▲35,680	▼189.1	▲5.0 %	▲0.3 %	▼5.0 %	▼39.5 %
2016	▲389.4	▲36,807	▲198.2	▲2.6 %	▲0.6 %	▼3.9 %	▼36.2 %
2017	▲416.8	▲39,288	▲221.6	▲5.2 %	▲2.4 %	▼2.9 %	▼33.8 %
2018	▲442.6	▲41,560	▲252.0	▲2.8 %	▲2.2 %	▼2.2 %	▼31.7 %
2019	▲486.8	▲45,520	▲256.8	▲3.6 %	▲2.8 %	▼2.0 %	▼29.6 %
2020	▼479.7	▼44,823	▼251.1	▼−5.3 %	▲3.2 %	▲2.5 %	▲36.9 %
2021	▲525.2	▲49,944	▲291.0	▲4.0 %	▲3.9 %	▲2.7 %	▲40.7 %
2022	▲578.6	▲53,440	▲301.8	▲2.8 %	▲15.1 %	▼2.2 %	▲42.5 %
2023	▲600.3	▲55,325	▲345.1	0.0 %	▲10.7 %	▲2.6 %	▼42.2 %
2024	▲622.9	▲56,964	▲347.1	▲1.3 %	▲2.4 %	2.6 %	▲43.3 %
2025	▲656.9	▲60,247	▲389.0	▲2.5 %	▲2.5 %	▲2.9 %	▲44.6 %
2026	▲690.8	▲63,550	▲432.6	▲2.2 %	▲2.4 %	▲3.0 %	▲46.4 %

=== Background ===
From the CIA World Factbook 2017 GDP (pp.): $353.9 billion (2016) GDP (nom.): $195.3 billion (2016) GDP Growth: 2.6% (2016) GDP per capita (pp.): $33,500 (2016) GDP per capita (nom.): $18,487 (2016) GDP by sector: Agriculture: 2.5% Industry: 37.5% Services: 60% (2016) Inflation: 0.7% (2016) Labour Force: 5.427 million (2017) Unemployment: 2,3% (September 2018)

Industrial production growth rate: 3.5% (2016)

Household income or consumption by percentage share: (2015)

- lowest 10%: 4.1%
- highest 10%: 21.7%

Public Debt: 34.2% GDP (2018)

=== Trade and finance ===
Exports of the Czech Republic by product category (2019) Chemical products Transportation Machines Mineral products Plastics and rubbers Metals Foodstuffs Precious metals Textiles Instruments Animal products Vegetable products Paper goods Footwear and headwear Miscellaneous Stone and glass Wood products Animal and vegetable bi-products Animal hides Arts and antiques Weapons

Exports: $136.1 billion Export goods: machinery and transport equipment, raw materials, fuel, chemicals (2018)

Imports: $122.8 billion Import goods: machinery and transport equipment, raw materials and fuels, chemicals (2018) Current Account balance: $2.216 billion (2018) Export partners: Germany 32.4%, Slovakia 8.4%, Poland 5.8%, UK 5.2%, France 5.2%, Italy 4.3%, Austria 4.2% (2016) Import partners: Germany 30.6%, Poland 9.6%, China 7.5%, Slovakia 6.3%, Netherlands 5.3%, Italy 4.1% (2016) Reserves: $85.73 billion (31 December 2016) Foreign Direct Investment: $139.6 billion (31 December 2016) Czech Investment Abroad: $43.09 billion (31 December 2016) External debt: $138 billion (31 December 2016) Value of Publicly Traded Shares: $44.5 billion (31 December 2016)

Exchange rates:

- koruny (Kč) per US$1 – 21.82 Kč (September 2018), 18.75 (December 2010), 18.277 (2007), 23.957 (2005), 25.7 (2004), 28.2 (2003), 32.7 (2002), 38.0 (2001), 38.6 (2001), 34.6 (1999), 32.3 (1998), 31.7 (1997), 27.1 (1996), 26.5 (1995)
- koruny (Kč) per EUR€1 – 27.33 (May 2015), 25.06 (December 2010)

=== IT and Telecommunications ===
Households with access to fixed and mobile telephone access

- landline telephone – 25% (2009)
  - according to the Czech Statistical Office: 55,2% (2005); 31,1% (2008); 27,6% (2009); 24,2% (2010); 23,4% (2011); 21,8% (2012)
- mobile telephone – 94% (2009)
  - according to the Czech Statistical Office: 81,2% (2005); 92,4% (2008); 94,6% (2009); 95,6% (2010); 96,2% (2011); 97,0% (2012)

Individuals with mobile telephone access

- according to the Czech Statistical Office: 75,8% (2005); 90,6% (2009); 93,9% (2011); 96,0% (2012); 96,0% (2013)

Broadband penetration rate

- fixed broadband – 19.1% (2010)
- mobile broadband – 3.5% (2010)

Individuals using computer and internet

- computer – 67% (2009)
  - according to the Czech Statistical Office: 42,0% (2005); 59,2% (2009); 64,1% (2010); 67,1% (2011); 69,5% (2012); 70,2% (2013)
- internet – 80.9% (2019)
  - according to the Czech Statistical Office: 32,1% (2005); 55,9% (2009); 61,8% (2010); 65,5% (2011); 69,5% (2012); 70,4% (2013)

=== Companies ===
By the end of 2025, the Statistical Business Register maintained by the Czech Statistical Office contained 2,893,480 economic entities, of which 1,780,970 were identified as active. Among entities with a recorded principal activity, the largest categories were wholesale and retail trade; professional, scientific and technical activities; industry; and construction.

The 2025 CZECH TOP 100 revenue ranking placed EPH first, followed by Škoda Auto, ČEZ, Agrofert and Hyundai Motor Manufacturing Czech.

In the 2025 ranking of businesses under Czech control by estimated value, PPF Group placed second overall behind the state-controlled ČEZ, making it the highest-ranked privately owned group. The group reported consolidated assets of €42.6 billion at the end of 2025.

== International rankings ==
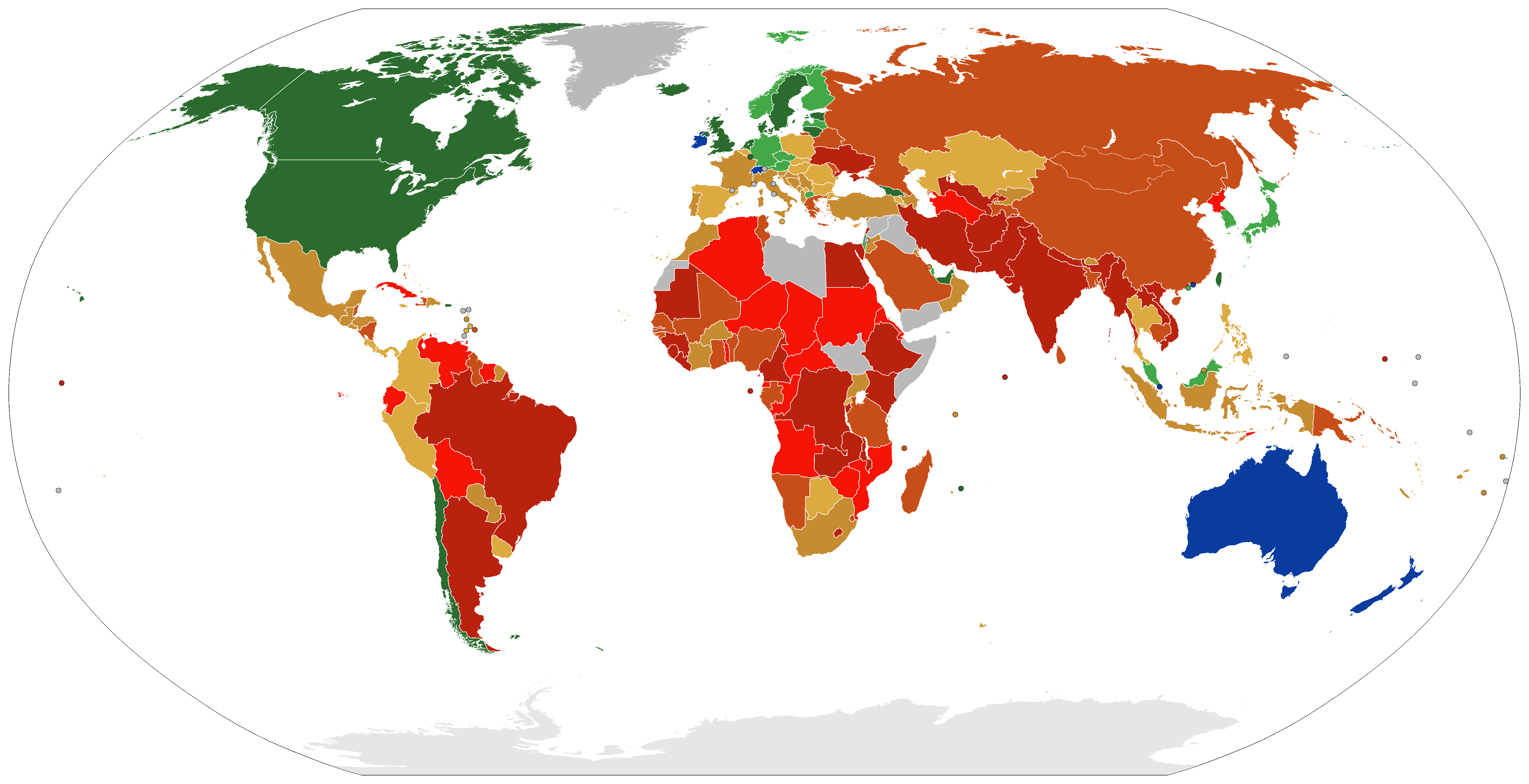
Index of Economic Freedom 2018

Credit ratings by Standard & Poor's

=== Macroeconomics ===
- 41st in Ease of doing business index (2019)
- 7th in Economic Complexity Index (2018)
- 26th in Global Competitiveness Report (2022)
- 25th in Global Enabling Trade Report (2016)
- 32nd in Global Innovation Index (2025)
- 21st in Index of Economic Freedom (2018)

=== Society and quality of life ===
- 32nd in Human Development Index (2022)
- 18th in inequality-adjusted Human Development Index (2022)
- 6th in Henley Passport Index (2024)
- 24th in Human Capital Index (2018)
- 16th in Quality of Nationality Index (Henley & Partners, 2018)
- 27th in Legatum Prosperity Index (2019)
- 22nd in Social Progress Index (2019)

== See also ==
- List of Czech regions by GDP
- Czech National Bank
- CzechInvest and CzechStartups.org
- Automotive industry in the Czech Republic
- Venture capital in the Czech Republic
- International rankings of the Czech Republic
- Prague Stock Exchange
- Tourism in the Czech Republic
- Transport in the Czech Republic

== Resources ==
- Statistická ročenka České republiky (Statistical Yearbook of the Czech Republic) by the Czech Statistical Office. The current line is published annually since 1957. Recent yearbooks can be read online (in Czech and English).
- Czechoslovakia published its first statistical yearbook in 1920. Historically used names: Statistická příručka Republiky československé, Statistická ročenka Protektorátu Čechy a Morava (during the occupation) and Statistická ročenka Československé socialistické republiky.
- Statistics about the Czech lands in Austria-Hungary were collected by Zemský statistický úřad Království českého (Provincial Statistical Office of the Czech Kingdom) founded in 1897. Two detailed books (in Czech and German) were published in 1909 and 1913.
- Benacek, Vladimir: economics of alliances and (dis)integration, an alternative interpretation of transition illustrated on Czech economic history (June 2002) - 25 p.
- Horvath, Julius: the Czech currency crisis of 1997 - En: Dabrovski, Marek: currency crises in emerging markets - New York: Springer, 2003 - p. 221-234
- OECD: economic surveys, Czech republic, 1991-2018 (OECD iLibrary)
- Zidek, Libor: from central planning to the market, the transformation of the Czech economy 1989-2004 Budapest: CEU press, 2017
