= Nayaone =

British financial technology company

NayaOne Limited
- Type: Private
- Industry: Financial technology
- Website: nayaone.com

NayaOne is a British financial technology company based in London. It provides sandbox environments in which banks, regulators and other organisations can test third-party software and data before using it in live systems. Since 2023, it has operated the Financial Conduct Authority's (FCA) Digital Sandbox.

== History ==
NayaOne was incorporated in the United Kingdom in 2019. Karan Jain, a former executive at Westpac, became chief executive in 2021.

In 2022, Lloyds Banking Group launched an innovation sandbox built with NayaOne. The same year, NayaOne and FinTech North launched a sandbox programme for financial institutions in northern England. In April 2023, the FCA announced that NayaOne would build and operate its permanent Digital Sandbox, under a three-year contract worth about £1 million that had been awarded in 2022. In 2023, Valley Bank also launched an innovation platform using NayaOne's technology.

In February 2024, the company raised US$4.7 million in a funding round led by EJF Capital, with participation from Valley Ventures and Carthona Capital. Later that year, it was ranked 29th in Deloitte's UK Technology Fast 50.

In June 2025, the FCA launched its Supercharged Sandbox, an environment for testing artificial intelligence applications in financial services, using NayaOne's infrastructure and Nvidia computing. In 2025, CzechInvest selected NayaOne to provide the testing environment for the Czech fintech regulatory sandbox.

== Services ==
NayaOne provides sandbox environments in which organisations can test external software, using resources such as synthetic data and APIs, without connecting it to their live systems. It also offers a sandbox for evaluating artificial intelligence systems. The company has provided infrastructure for the World Economic Forum's UAE TradeTech Regulatory Sandbox.
