= CzechStartups.org =

Cloud platform

Web portal CzechStartups.org is an online platform for startup companies that fosters the communication between startups, investors and infrastructure (incubators and accelerators) and startup environment in the Czech Republic. The project was launched in Autumn 2015 as a project of the Czech Investment and Business Development Agency, CzechInvest, in collaboration with key project partners IBM, Czech ICT Alliance, AMSP and Rockaway. The website is built upon IBM Bluemix, a SoftLayer cloud infrastructure. The portal is available in English and Czech.

== Formation ==
CzechInvest has been committed to supporting small and medium enterprises for a long time. In the past, the agency also started projects to support startups, CzechEkoSystem and CzechAccelerator that helped startups of all kinds to break abroad. CzechInvest and its new startup department in cooperation with the project partners decided to build the first digital city in the Central and Eastern Europe. The Web portal serves as a place where startups can meet with other innovative companies along with investors and startups overall infrastructure (accelerators, incubators, coworking centers) in the Czech Republic. The CzechStartups.org project was launched in a test mode in Fall 2015.

== Activities ==
The web portal CzechStartups.org concentrates basic information about the Czech startup environment in one place accessible to all. The portal provides its readers with information about existing supportive programs for startups and contacts with the amount of support providers, which allow the growth and development of start-ups or give instructions and tips on how to do business. The portal also gathers an extensive database of both startups and investors (Angel investors, Venture Capital, Investment Fund (Private Equity) and others), and infrastructures that help with orientation in the Czech startup environment - that includes daily news from the startup world, including reports on successful cases of Czech startups that have already succeeded and that can serve as motivation for other start-up companies. The portal brings current information about various startup events and conferences.

== Project goals ==
As main objective, CzechStartups.org aims to connect the Czech startup scene, especially among startups / investors / infrastructure, and to inform the world about the Czech startup environment.

== See also ==
- Economy of the Czech Republic
