= Invest Europe =

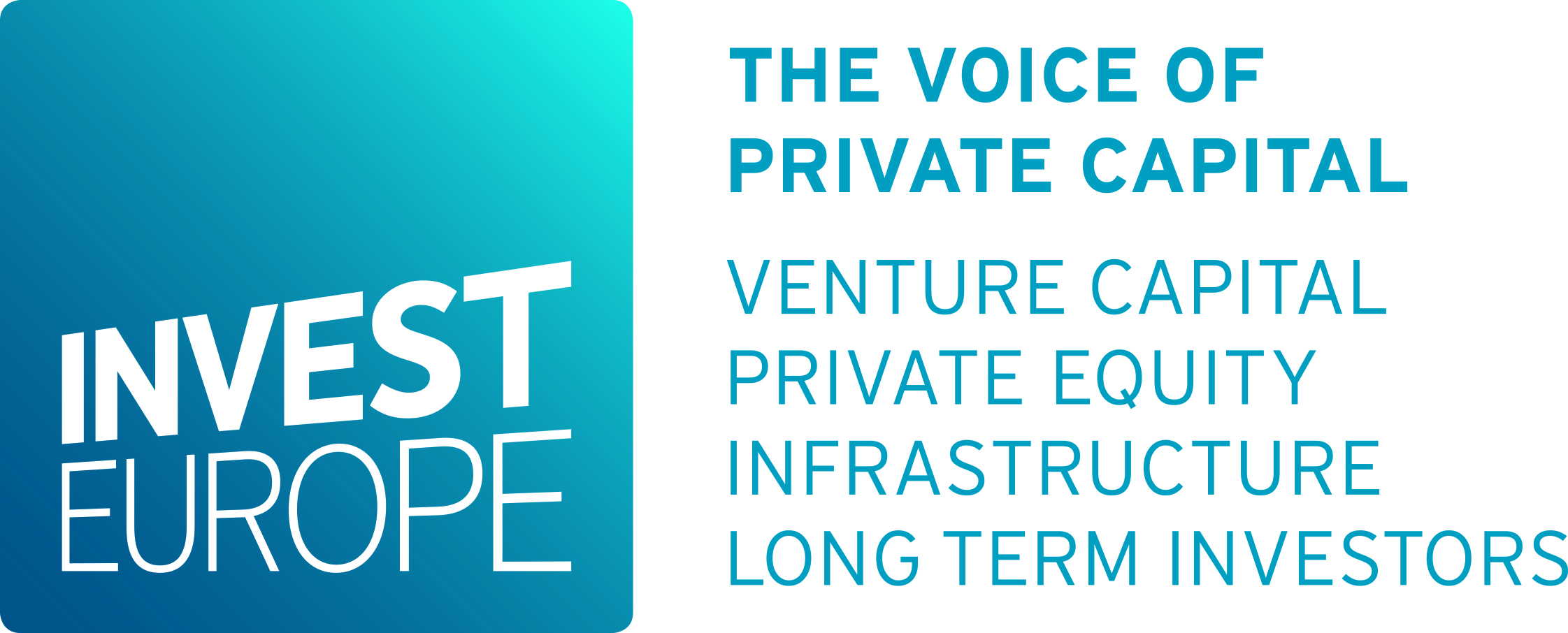
- Type: Private
- Industry: Private equity
- Founded: 1983; 43 years ago
- Headquarters: Brussels, Belgium
- Website: investeurope.eu

Invest Europe is a trade association representing Europe's private equity, venture capital and infrastructure sectors, as well as their investors. Invest Europe provides research and data on private capital activity, engages with policymakers to strengthen Europe’s business and innovation ecosystem, and promotes long-term investment across Europe. It also publishes a Professional Standards Handbook, a comprehensive set of standards and guidelines for the private equity industry.

The association has more than 650 members, divided roughly equally among private equity firms, venture capital firms and limited partners, alongside around 110 associate members representing advisers and service providers. Its member base spans 57 countries, including 42 in Europe, and collectively manages around 60% of the European private equity and venture capital industry’s €1.247 trillion in assets under management.

== History ==
Invest Europe was founded in 1983 as the European Private Equity and Venture Capital Association (EVCA). It rebranded as Invest Europe in 2015 to reflect the industry’s changes and its role in innovation, employment and the European economy.

In 2021, Invest Europe committed to becoming carbon-neutral by 2030.

== Key activities ==
The association works across public affairs, research, communication. It publishes regular reports, statistical data and guidelines, and engages with EU-level regulatory processes and national governments. The association hosts annual industry events in Europe, including the Investors' Forum, the Venture Capital Forum and the CFO Forum.

== Research ==
Invest Europe's data is used by a number of institutions, including the European Investment Fund and the Organisation for Economic Co-operation and Development, and the European Commission. It also works with other organisations to produce reports, including the European Investment Fund, the EUIPO, Arthur D. Little, and Atomico.

Invest Europe data collection is supported by the European Data Cooperative (EDC), a joint initiative developed by Invest Europe and other national private capital associations to collect Europe-wide industry data on activity, economic impact and ESG. The EDC is jointly owned and operated by the private equity and venture capital associations of Europe and brings together data from 4,000 firms, 10,900 funds and 86,700 portfolio companies.

== Leadership and governance ==
Based in Brussels, Invest Europe's is led by chief executive officer Eric de Montgolfier. The organisation hold elections annually for the role of chair. In 2026, Sander Slootweg, managing partner and co-founder of Forbion, was named as chair of Invest Europe for the 2026–27 term, succeeding Elias Korosis, global investment partner at Federated Hermes Private Equity, who was chair for 2025–26. Previous chairs have included Klaus Hommels, a German venture capitalist based in Zürich, Switzerland and founder of venture capital firm Lakestar, and Johannes Huth of American global private equity and investment company KKR.

=== Chairs of Invest Europe ===
- 1996-97: Raynier van Outryve d'Ydewalle – Drie Koningen RVO N.V.
- 1997-98: Falk Strascheg – EXTOREL GmbH
- 1998-99: Paul Waller – Hamilton Lane
- 1999-00: Emile van der Burg – Jemburg Management
- 2000-01: Ari Tolppanen – CapMan
- 2001-02: Edoardo Bugnone – Top Quartile Partners
- 2002-03: Max Burger-Calderon – Golien Ltd
- 2003-04: Jean-Bernard Schmidt – HarbourVest Partners
- 2004-05: Herman Daems – BNP Paribas Fortis
- 2005-06: David Cooksey – SVP Global
- 2006-07: Javier Loizaga Jiménez – N+1 Private Equity
- 2007-08: Helmut Schuehsler – TVM Capital Life Science
- 2008-09: Jonathan Russell – Spire Partners
- 2009-10: Richard Wilson – Apax Partners
- 2010-11: Uli Fricke – Triangle Venture Capital Group
- 2011-12: Karsten Langer – Riverside Europe Partners
- 2012-13: Vincenzo Morelli – TPG Inc.
- 2013-14: George Anson – HarbourVest Partners
- 2014-15: Stephen Welton – Business Growth Fund
- 2015-16: Jérôme Henrion – Gimv
- 2016-17: Jonathan Dean – AXA Investment Managers
- 2017-18: Nenad Marovac – DN Capital
- 2018-19: Michael Collins – Invest Europe
- 2019-20: Laurent Deville – LGT Capital Partners
- 2020-21: Frans Tieleman – CVC Capital Partners
- 2021-22: Anne Fossemalle – EBRD
- 2022-23: Max Römer – Quadriga Capital
- 2023-24: Klaus Hommels – Lakestar
- 2024-25: Johannes Huth – KKR
- 2025-26: Elias Korosis – Federated Hermes Private Equity
