= European Investment Fund =

Agency of the European Union

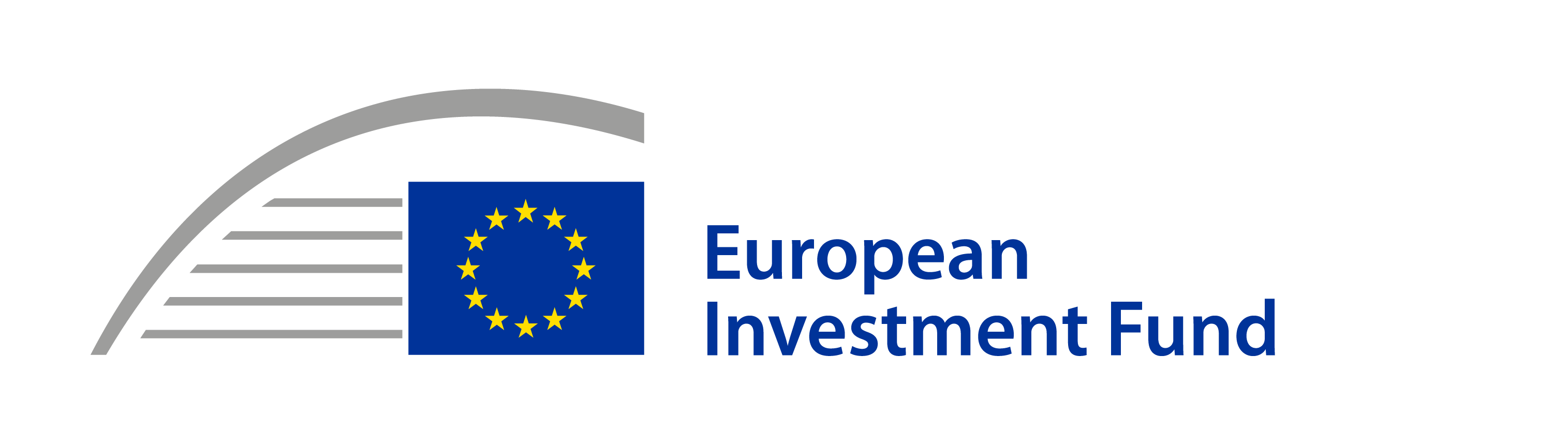
- Founded: 1994
- Type: International financial institution
- Location: Luxembourg
- Region served: European Union, Turkey, Norway, Switzerland, Iceland, Liechtenstein, Western Balkan, Moldova, Ukraine, Israel, other countries
- Products: Guarantee products, Equity products, Inclusive finance instruments
- Owner: EU member states
- Chief Executive: Marjut Falkstedt
- Deputy Chief Executive: Merete Clausen
- Employees: 700+
- Website: www.eif.org

The European Investment Fund (EIF), established in 1994, is a financial institution for the provision of risk finance to SMEs (small and medium-sized enterprises), headquartered in Luxembourg. It is an EU body with the mandate to facilitate access to finance for European SMEs, by sharing or reducing the financial risk. The EIF is a part of the European Investment Bank Group and its task is to support the European Union public policy goals.

In 2024, the EIF channeled €14.4 billion of financing towards deeptech, life sciences, greentech, social impact funds, dual use defense technologies, and scale-up funds. Near to 43% of these investments (€6.1 billion) were green, and 45% went to regions in which economic development is below the EU average. In April 2025, Sifted reported that the EIF was "Europe's biggest limited partner", with "€143.7 billion in assets under management."

It does not lend money to SMEs directly; rather it provides finance through financial intermediaries that include banks, alternative lenders, and equity funds. Its main operations are in the areas of venture capital, private equity, private debt, guaranteeing loan portfolios, and securitization. In 2024, the EIF placed more than €7 billion in equity investments and worked with 96 new financial intermediaries.

Its shareholders are: the European Investment Bank (59.78%); the European Union, represented by the European Commission (29.72%); and 38 financial institutions (10.5%). As of 1 January 2023, the Chief Executive is Marjut Falkstedt.

The EIF implemented the SME portion of the EU's European Fund for Strategic Investments (EFSI), also known as the Juncker Plan. Launched in 2015, the EFSI aimed to improve employment and economic growth by mobilizing €315 billion investment in European infrastructure projects by mid-2018. Since 2021, the EIF and the EIB have had a key role in implementing InvestEU, which is the successor to Juncker's EFSI.

The EIF participated in the EU's COVID-19 crisis response via the €25 billion Pan-European Guarantee Fund (EGF), launched in August 2020 to help SMEs through the crisis.

The EIF employs more than 700 people.

== History ==
The EIF was founded in 1994 by the European Community (represented by the European Commission), the European Investment Bank and private financial institutions from 12 European countries. The foundational legal document, the Statutes of the European Investment Fund, was adopted by the EIB Board of Governors on 25 May 1994. The Statutes set the goals and the operation of the EIF under the European Investment Bank framework. It established EIF as a public-private partnership with the initial capital of 2 billion ecus, divided into 2000 shares. The 1994 Statutes specified that the task of the Fund was to support “the development of trans-European networks in the areas of transport, telecommunications and energy infrastructures, and the development of small and medium-sized enterprises”, by providing guarantee instruments for SME loans. The list of initial shareholders included financial institutions from Belgium, Denmark, Germany, Greece, Spain, France, Ireland, Italy, Luxembourg, the Netherlands, Portugal and the UK.

In 1997, the EIF started its activities in venture capital. In June 2000, the EIF was restructured, and the European Investment Bank became the majority shareholder. The European Investment Bank Group was established, and the EIF became the venture capital arm of the EIB Group. It has continued to provide guarantees for SME financing to financial institutions across Europe.

When the European Commission president Jean-Claude Juncker (2014–2019) introduced the €315 billion Investment plan for Europe, centered around the European Fund for Strategic Investments (EFSI), the EIF led the implementation of the SME Window of EFSI. Launched in July 2015 by the European Union and the European Investment Bank Group, EFSI aimed to attract private investment (loans) for infrastructure projects that would kick-start Europe's economy.

The EIF also participated in the EU's COVID-19 crisis response via the €25 billion Pan-European Guarantee Fund (EGF), launched in August 2020 to support SMEs in getting through the crisis. For example, EIF's €350 million guarantee to Spanish banks, announced in December 2021, aimed to help the country's SMEs recover liquidity and safeguard jobs during the pandemic.

In 2024, the EIF marked 30 years of operation and became the official partner of the European Association of Guarantee Institutions (AECM). European Investment Fund estimated that, in the three decades since founding, it has financed around 2.1 million of micro, small and medium-sized businesses in Europe.

== Activity areas ==
The European Investment Fund has a mandate from the European Union to support the creation and development of small and mid-sized companies. It is an enabler of EU policy objectives. It operates mainly in the EU countries, with some activity in the European Free Trade Association (EFTA), and in EU candidate and potential candidate countries.

Key SME finance initiatives of the EIF are the InvestEU programme and ETCI fund of funds.

=== InvestEU ===
InvestEU accounted for around 45% of the EIF activity in 2022, and for 40 percent (€5.75 billion) of the EIF commitments in 2024. The program is policy-led and built around four investment pillars: sustainable infrastructure; research, innovation and digitisation; small and medium-sized businesses; and social investment and skills. Under the InvestEU program, the EIF launched the first guarantee instrument “dedicated exclusively to sustainability”. Female representation, investments in climate and infrastructure funds and support for tech scale-ups and IPOs have been listed by the EIF as the novelties that InvestEU has brought since 2022. InvestEU is implemented on behalf of the European Union, and is the successor to the European Fund for Strategic Investments (EFSI), also known as the “Juncker Plan”. The EIB Group, of which EIF is part, is responsible for managing 75% of the InvestEU.

=== ETCI and TechEU ===
The European Tech Champions Initiative (ETCI) is a fund of funds that was launched in February 2023 by Belgium, France, Germany, Italy and Spain, together with the European Investment Bank Group. The ETCI invests in venture capital funds that invest in European scaleups, i.e. fast-growing tech companies. At the time of founding, the ETCI capital was €3.75 billion.

In May 2025 the European Investment Bank announced plans to provide €70 billion in startup and scaleup funding by 2027, under the wider TechEU platform launching later in the year. The EIB reported that the majority of capital for later-stage funding of European scaleups (typically in the range above €50 million) is coming from outside Europe; for such rounds of funding, “there are at least seven times more funds in the US than in the EU”. Stakes in EU tech companies are often sold out of Europe, and often to US investors. TechEU aims to support European tech innovation and close the funding gap with the US.

In 2024, the EIF established the Defence Equity Facility, an equity fund worth €175 million. In July 2024, the EIF signed a Memorandum of Understanding with NATO’s Innovation Fund (NIF).

== Governance ==
The European Investment Fund is managed by three authorities: the General Meeting, the Board of Directors and the Chief Executive.

=== General Meeting ===
The General Meeting is held at least once per year. It consists of one representative of the European Investment Bank, one member of the European Commission and one representative from each financial institution that holds EIF shares. Each fund member's voting power corresponds to their number of shares. Decisions are adopted by the majority of the votes cast. General Meeting can decide on the admission of new members, approve annual reports submitted by the Board of Directors, approve annual balance sheets and PL accounts, amend the Statutes, appoint the Audit Board, increase the EIF capital, suspend or expel members, appoint the Board of Directors et al.

=== Board of Directors ===
The Board of Directors has seven members. They are appointed by the General Meeting for a term of two years. Each of the three shareholder groups is represented. The Board meets nine to ten times per year and is accountable only to the General Meeting. It has the power to decide on all the EIF operations, which includes setting the return criteria and the limits of borrowing operations. It appoints the Chief Executive and the Deputy Chief Executive and submits the annual accounts and report to the General Meeting.

=== Chief Executive ===
The EIF is managed by a Chief Executive, appointed for a term of up to 5 years. The Chief Executive oversees the daily operations of the EIF and reports to the Board.

=== Audit Board ===
The EIF is audited annually by an independent Audit Board, appointed by the General Meeting. The Audit Board usually has six members. It checks if EIF's operations have been carried out in accordance with the Statues, Rules of Procedure, and sound standards of banking. It checks if the financial accounts submitted by the Board of Directors give a true view of EIF's financial position, assets and liabilities.

== See also ==
- Institutions of the European Union
- European Investment Bank
- European Innovation Council
- Development finance institution
- International Monetary Fund
- International financial institutions
