= International rankings of the Czech Republic =

These are the international rankings of the Czech Republic.

== International rankings ==
- Democracy Index 2017: Ranks 34th of 167 countries
- Global Competitiveness Report 2011-12: Ranks 38th out of 142 countries
- Global Peace Index May 2018: Ranks 7th out of 163 countries
- Human Development Index 2016: Ranks 28th out of 188 countries
- Index of Economic Freedom 2018: Ranks 24th out of 180 countries
- Reporters Without Borders worldwide Press Freedom Index 2018: Ranks 34th out of 180 countries
- World Economic Forum Travel & Tourism Competitiveness Report: 39th.
- Education - "Science performance" Index 2009: High positions in rankings
- World Intellectual Property Organization: Global Innovation Index 2026, ranked 33 out of 139 countries
