= InvestEU =

The InvestEU Programme, until 2021 known as the European Fund for Strategic Investments (EFSI), also called the Juncker Plan, is an initiative of EIB Group and the European Commission aimed at boosting the economy through mobilising private financing for strategic investments. EFSI was established in 2015 through the EU Regulation 2015/1017. EFSI is one of the three pillars of the Investment Plan for Europe. EFSI is a EUR 16 billion guarantee from the EU budget plus EUR 5 billion from the EIB’s own capital. EFSI has been integrated into the EIB Group and projects supported by EFSI are subject to the normal EIB project cycle and governance.

Economists predict that the programme's investments will raise EU GDP by 1.9 trillion and generate 1.8 million jobs by 2022, relative to the baseline scenario.
