= List of Czech regions by GDP =

This is a list of Czech regions by GDP and GDP per capita by The Czech Statistical Office. All exchange rates are based on the average for 2022. (USDCZK - 23.36)

== List of Regions by GDP ==
Regions by GDP in 2022 according to data by the Czech Statistical Office.

Rank	Region	GDP in billions CZK	GDP in billions USD
1	Prague	1,926,323	82,462
2	Central Bohemia	775,682	33,206
3	South Moravian	745,193	31,900
4	Moravian-Silesian	597,665	25,585
5	Ústí nad Labem	360,731	15,442
6	Plzeň	326,669	13,984
7	Olomouc	317,890	13,608
8	South Bohemia	309,007	13,228
9	Zlín	304,826	13,049
10	Hradec Králové	299,250	12,810
11	Pardubice	268,290	11,485
12	Vysočina	241,562	10,341
13	Liberec	202,639	8,675
14	Karlovy Vary	111,015	4,752
	Czech Republic	6,786,742	290,528

== List of Regions by GDP per capita ==
Regions by GDP per capita in 2022 according to data by the Czech Statistical Office.

Rank	Region	GDP per capita in CZK	GDP per capita in USD
1	Prague	1,453,579	62,225
2	South Moravian	624,757	26,745
3	Central Bohemia	557,641	23,872
4	Plzeň	553,512	23,695
5	Hradec Králové	543,106	23,249
6	Zlín	524,888	22,470
7	Pardubice	513,222	21,970
8	Olomouc	503,709	21,563
9	Moravian-Silesian	499,813	21,396
10	South Bohemia	480,506	20,570
11	Vysočina	474,282	20,303
12	Liberec	457,749	19,595
13	Ústí nad Labem	440,737	18,867
14	Karlovy Vary	377,886	16,177
	Czech Republic	634,993	27,183
