= CzechInvest =

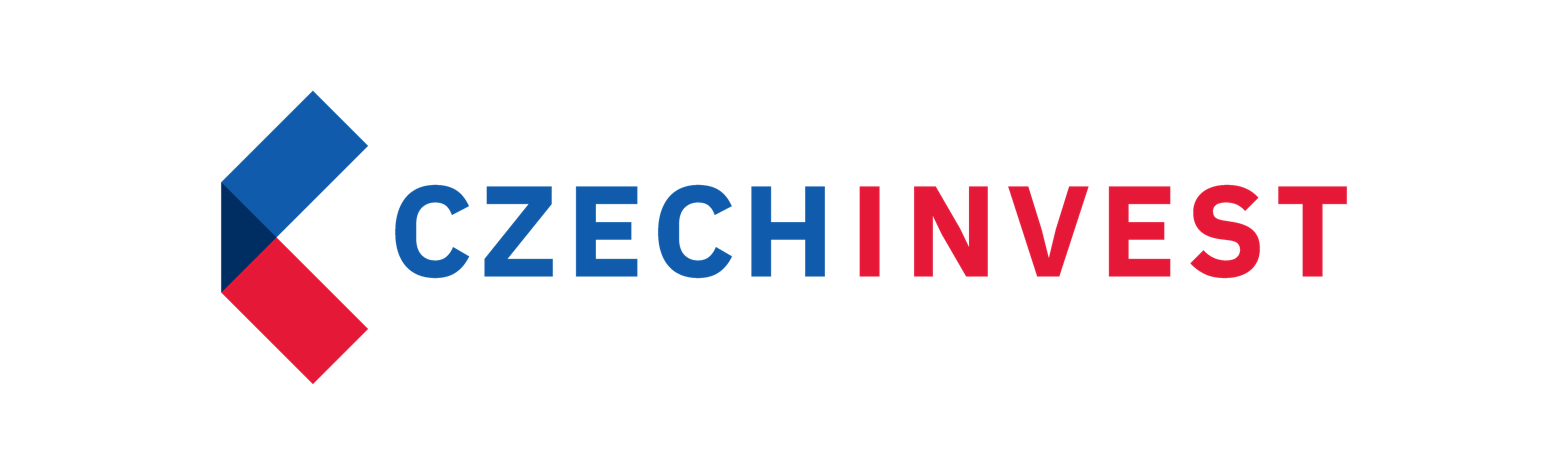

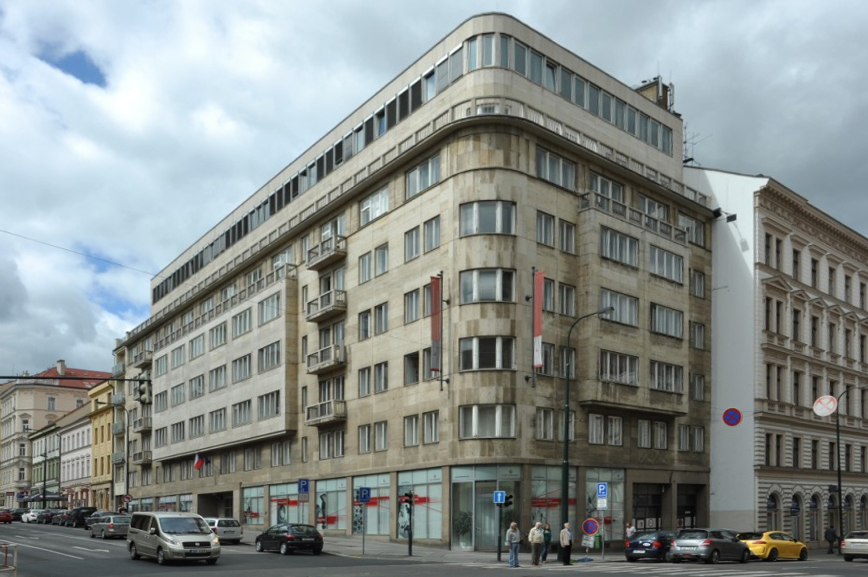
CzechInvest headquarters in Prague

CzechInvest is the Investment and Business Development Agency of the Czech Republic established in 1992 by the Ministry of Industry and Trade. The agency contributes to attracting foreign direct investment and developing domestic companies through its services and development programs. CzechInvest also promotes the Czech Republic abroad and acts as an intermediary between the EU and small and medium-sized enterprises in implementing Structural funds in the Czech Republic.

== Mission ==
CzechInvest's main objective is to advise and support existing and new entrepreneurs and foreign investors in the Czech Republic.

The Czech Republic under the leadership of CzechInvest has as of 2010 attracted foreign direct investment worth more than US$25 billion. According to the World Bank, CzechInvest runs the best web pages among all investment promotion agencies of the world.

== Activities ==
CzechInvest is exclusively authorized to file applications for investment incentives at the competent governing bodies and prepares draft offers to grant investment incentives. The agency also administers all of the business related and many of science related Structural funds for the Czech Republic. Its task is also to provide potential investors current data and information on business climate, investment environment and investment opportunities in the Czech Republic.

CzechInvest provides all its services free of charge. Activities include:

- full information assistance
- tailor-made visits
- handling of investment incentives
- access to EU structural funds
- business properties identification
- business infrastructure development
- search for potential suppliers/JV/acquisition partners
- care for existing investors

== Foreign offices ==
CzechInvest has 9 foreign offices located in:

- London, England, for United Kingdom and Ireland
- Tokyo, Japan, for Japan
- Düsseldorf, Germany, for Germany, Austria and Switzerland
- New York City, United States, for East Coast of United States
- San Francisco, California, United States, for West Coast United States
- Toronto, Canada, for Canada
- Seoul, South Korea South Korea, for South Korea
- Prague, Czech Republic, for Scandinavia

The agency also has its office in every regional capital of the Czech Republic

== See also ==
- CzechStartups.org
- Economy of the Czech Republic
- Foreign relations of the Czech Republic
