= List of countries by past and projected GDP (nominal) =

This is an alphabetical list of countries by past and projected gross domestic product (nominal) as ranked by the IMF. Figures are based on official exchange rates, not on the purchasing power parity (PPP) methodology. Values are given in millions of United States dollars (USD) and have not been adjusted for inflation. These figures have been taken from the International Monetary Fund's World Economic Outlook (WEO) Database (October 2026 edition) and/or other sources.

For older GDP trends, see List of regions by past GDP (PPP).

== UN estimates (1970s) ==
The following Table is based on UN GDP data.

* indicates "GDP of [country or territory]" or "Economy of [country or territory]" links.

Country / area	1970	1971	1972	1973	1974	1975	1976	1977	1978	1979
Afghanistan *	1,749	1,831	1,596	1,733	2,156	2,367	2,556	2,953	3,300	3,698
Albania *	2,266	2,331	2,398	2,467	2,537	2,610	2,686	2,761	2,842	2,372
Algeria *	5,167	5,376	7,193	9,250	13,290	15,591	17,790	21,038	26,433	33,276
Andorra *	99	113	144	191	236	279	288	321	390	521
Angola *	3,807	4,007	4,102	5,016	5,627	4,147	3,981	4,344	4,845	5,380
Anguilla *	4	5	5	6	7	7	7	8	9	11
Antigua and Barbuda *	34	41	56	78	84	85	71	81	92	113
Argentina *	33,985	40,655	37,908	41,468	47,637	51,741	54,575	61,662	63,865	73,987
Aruba *	177	186	196	206	217	229	241	254	268	282
Australia *	45,121	50,360	59,269	85,621	102,047	108,853	117,298	116,222	135,608	150,133
Austria *	15,336	17,816	22,007	29,444	35,104	39,962	42,856	51,423	61,901	73,763
Bahamas *	568	605	624	708	756	892	971	1,162	1,336	1,579
Bahrain *	422	455	576	820	1,123	1,185	1,705	2,144	2,449	2,920
Bangladesh *	6,196	5,578	6,215	6,772	8,088	8,476	9,447	9,950	12,751	14,758
Barbados *	216	243	278	339	405	476	517	588	658	798
Belgium *	26,850	29,982	37,409	47,999	56,334	66,028	71,495	83,282	101,793	116,940
Belize *	25	32	42	68	90	104	82	106	121	141
Benin *	322	342	421	516	554	674	718	786	954	1,162
Bermuda *	266	301	336	384	446	492	551	598	646	752
Bhutan *	62	66	70	79	93	87	88	98	94	105
Bolivia *	1,010	1,094	1,279	1,249	2,099	2,399	2,749	2,765	3,020	3,274
Botswana *	67	88	115	169	236	274	297	383	456	595
Brazil *	35,214	39,332	50,624	71,673	91,888	108,051	127,741	148,672	168,803	186,095
British Virgin Islands *	20	17	18	20	24	27	29	30	35	43
Brunei *	225	248	340	544	1,348	1,467	1,787	2,176	2,439	3,522
Bulgaria *	9,000	8,897	10,407	12,409	13,495	11,908	12,625	12,908	13,982	9,408
Burkina Faso *	450	459	587	679	748	890	853	1,031	1,328	1,782
Burundi *	245	252	246	305	346	414	456	542	612	791
Cape Verde *	64	72	82	101	101	118	110	103	119	127
Cambodia *	774	776	800	710	711	746	799	738	806	768
Cameroon *	1,157	1,297	1,673	2,272	2,427	3,187	3,473	4,062	5,347	7,116
Canada *	86,303	97,475	111,031	128,945	157,498	170,692	202,829	207,789	214,677	238,664
Cayman Islands *	24	30	39	51	60	72	86	102	122	145
Central African Republic *	264	281	321	378	392	528	629	708	852	977
Chad *	414	452	469	521	607	876	823	832	991	894
Chile *	9,559	11,443	12,354	17,611	17,069	7,941	10,843	14,699	16,940	22,806
China *	91,039	98,059	111,589	136,071	141,529	160,340	150,854	171,467	214,160	263,190
Colombia *	10,193	11,062	12,282	14,531	17,462	18,508	21,674	27,519	32,864	39,497
Comoros *	20	22	26	34	39	60	59	65	85	113
DR Congo	3,000	3,353	3,701	4,719	5,754	6,138	5,786	7,401	10,507	10,297
Congo *	262	300	360	480	580	683	709	707	879	1,194
Cook Islands *	9	9	9	12	14	14	13	15	18	20
Costa Rica *	1,251	1,369	1,573	1,943	2,118	2,492	3,065	3,904	4,477	5,127
Ivory Coast *	1,501	1,597	1,872	2,540	3,070	3,894	4,662	6,265	7,901	9,142
Cuba *	5,693	6,915	8,135	9,988	11,406	13,027	13,790	14,206	17,845	19,584
Curaçao *	5,693	6,915	8,135	9,988	11,406	13,027	13,790	14,206	17,845	19,584
Cyprus *	569	666	810	986	873	728	842	1,073	1,404	1,840
Czechoslovakia *	16,294	17,039	19,527	23,074	24,754	27,300	26,914	38,583	42,501	45,672
Denmark *	16,591	18,515	22,591	29,962	33,347	39,594	43,676	48,855	59,296	69,161
Djibouti *	66	75	90	112	141	157	187	201	221	264
Dominica *	23	26	28	32	38	40	39	44	54	53
Dominican Republic *	1,832	2,055	2,451	2,892	3,609	4,439	4,874	5,658	5,839	6,782
Ecuador *	1,762	1,686	1,973	2,620	3,906	4,536	5,596	7,005	8,056	9,851
Egypt *	8,143	8,629	9,227	9,589	11,334	12,678	14,974	19,136	23,432	15,616
El Salvador *	338	356	379	438	519	589	751	943	1,012	1,132
Equatorial Guinea *	20	21	20	26	27	34	35	39	44	50
Ethiopia *	2,559	2,709	2,958	3,421	3,846	3,828	4,160	4,730	5,034	5,533
Fiji *	223	249	320	430	564	691	702	727	838	1,030
Finland *	11,113	12,257	14,425	19,053	24,312	29,122	31,469	33,102	35,826	43,934
France *	146,436	163,704	200,946	261,468	282,158	355,617	367,273	405,397	500,052	605,041
French Polynesia *	233	272	299	395	509	633	717	771	975	1,211
Gabon *	396	467	527	885	1,890	2,641	3,684	3,439	2,925	3,709
Gambia *	96	101	132	224	293	352	323	342	406	445
Germany *	208,867	241,914	290,117	385,518	430,928	474,785	502,961	581,104	716,567	852,855
Ghana *	3,549	3,874	3,386	3,124	3,641	3,490	3,559	3,872	4,495	4,748
Greece *	12,524	13,908	16,094	21,300	24,163	27,212	29,715	34,493	42,200	51,954
Greenland *	68	87	104	138	167	208	237	278	350	414
Grenada *	17	21	28	35	36	44	44	50	64	75
Guatemala *	1,697	1,769	1,874	2,290	2,818	3,250	3,892	4,886	5,412	6,154
Guinea *	566	626	668	716	822	926	1,056	1,085	1,241	1,328
Guinea-Bissau *	307	305	357	440	483	556	500	430	497	544
Guyana *	427	452	458	488	684	804	711	703	793	829
Haiti *	331	363	372	467	565	681	879	947	974	1,081
Honduras *	824	872	958	1,089	1,234	1,341	1,608	1,992	2,302	2,686
Hong Kong *	3,812	4,456	5,702	8,022	9,374	10,044	12,873	15,706	18,297	22,495
Hungary *	6,270	6,824	8,004	9,911	10,863	12,387	14,354	16,031	18,741	21,639
Iceland *	519	660	827	1,133	1,493	1,386	1,645	2,176	2,475	2,811
India *	61,470	65,947	71,735	85,546	96,552	100,437	101,196	117,421	135,833	150,317
Indonesia *	9,805	10,295	12,083	17,878	28,349	33,472	40,948	50,331	56,535	56,473
Iran *	10,032	12,631	15,785	25,134	43,806	48,877	63,404	74,362	73,233	85,610
Iraq *	2,320	2,605	2,615	3,283	3,870	4,845	6,178	6,693	8,468	11,371
Ireland *	4,295	4,979	6,210	7,356	7,799	9,279	9,285	10,972	14,254	18,023
Israel *	6,070	6,401	8,431	10,807	14,655	14,502	15,243	16,495	16,232	20,891
Italy *	109,791	120,709	140,634	169,911	193,228	220,469	217,583	249,389	305,032	381,143
Jamaica *	1,591	1,741	2,119	2,173	2,700	3,251	3,371	3,694	3,006	2,765
Japan *	209,071	236,155	312,738	424,891	471,643	512,861	576,406	709,405	996,742	1,037,453
Jordan *	593	633	705	807	933	1,220	1,574	1,937	2,562	3,103
Kenya *	2,195	2,432	2,727	3,217	3,836	4,206	4,483	5,794	6,860	7,869
Kiribati *	21	22	28	46	83	80	60	56	65	62
North Korea *	4,927	5,440	6,006	6,630	7,320	8,081	8,412	8,757	9,116	9,490
South Korea *	8,936	9,894	10,794	13,805	19,397	21,648	29,774	38,227	51,539	66,218
Kuwait *	2,873	3,881	4,448	5,405	13,004	12,016	13,120	14,140	15,502	24,750
Laos *	113	125	134	154	174	204	222	231	250	265
Lebanon *	1,489	1,673	2,086	2,721	3,496	3,258	1,427	2,529	2,977	3,633
Lesotho *	67	65	77	116	132	138	136	178	245	267
Liberia *	259	273	296	346	423	509	527	590	646	744
Libya *	4,268	4,881	5,845	8,003	14,022	13,649	17,719	20,809	20,537	28,332
Liechtenstein *	90	105	125	166	194	246	272	303	437	503
Luxembourg *	1,445	1,506	1,886	2,588	3,157	3,097	3,395	3,757	4,679	5,470
Macau *	165	197	241	328	377	436	433	554	723	822
Madagascar *	898	971	1,110	1,367	1,549	1,844	1,762	1,905	2,156	2,798
Malawi *	442	555	635	612	756	845	923	1,111	1,307	1,403
Malaysia *	3,737	4,586	5,449	8,279	10,260	10,079	11,939	14,196	17,674	22,919
Maldives *	38	42	49	60	76	48	44	41	47	75
Mali *	276	330	373	433	406	604	716	833	965	1,220
Malta *	251	265	295	346	376	475	528	626	794	1,001
Marshall Islands *	8	9	10	12	15	17	18	20	22	26
Mauritania *	324	347	406	462	628	759	847	871	857	1,069
Mauritius *	197	221	278	348	578	581	722	844	1,041	1,241
Mexico *	43,426	47,897	55,200	67,532	87,943	107,525	108,589	100,097	125,438	164,346
Federated States of Micronesia *	21	23	27	37	49	49	50	50	57	64
Monaco *	293	328	403	524	565	712	736	812	1,002	1,212
Mongolia *	172	189	204	235	267	311	342	392	451	510
Montserrat *	6	7	8	9	10	12	10	11	13	16
Morocco *	4,421	4,731	5,681	6,973	8,576	10,039	10,710	12,347	14,790	17,779
Mozambique *	3,047	3,392	3,797	4,472	4,676	4,841	4,409	4,463	4,663	4,903
Myanmar *	2,692	2,757	2,568	3,340	3,981	3,680	4,089	4,191	4,678	5,365
Namibia *	633	707	708	898	1,096	1,169	1,123	1,248	1,438	1,777
Nauru *	18	19	22	27	32	29	29	28	31	33
Nepal *	1,041	1,061	1,231	1,144	1,458	1,617	1,494	1,484	1,749	1,987
Netherlands *	35,353	41,294	50,675	66,943	79,169	93,227	101,716	118,821	145,331	166,432
Netherlands Antilles	224	244	278	313	394	468	524	591	719	852
New Caledonia *	378	437	509	544	644	817	798	838	846	1,047
New Zealand *	6,507	7,799	9,418	12,489	14,121	13,656	13,874	15,132	18,315	21,051
Nicaragua *	882	939	1,000	1,242	1,727	1,806	2,098	2,543	2,431	1,740
Niger *	427	457	574	611	702	894	1,058	1,250	1,692	2,215
Nigeria *	11,567	14,026	16,829	21,140	32,688	39,763	48,441	54,157	60,593	74,798
Norway *	12,730	14,476	17,220	22,342	26,876	32,566	35,576	41,070	46,016	52,548
Oman *	268	315	384	506	1,724	2,196	2,681	2,870	2,871	3,911
Pakistan *	12,191	12,967	7,656	8,210	10,819	13,653	16,009	18,389	21,654	23,936
Palau *	9	10	11	12	13	15	16	17	19	21
Palestine	177	204	295	368	577	579	680	700	728	846
Panama *	1,147	1,294	1,422	1,626	1,859	2,082	2,211	2,344	2,779	3,181
Papua New Guinea *	726	811	970	1,467	1,661	1,536	1,652	1,819	2,211	2,543
Paraguay *	525	587	680	880	1,178	1,336	1,501	1,849	2,262	3,020
Peru *	5,861	6,539	7,248	8,667	10,928	13,346	12,729	11,475	9,851	12,583
Philippines *	7,413	8,209	8,883	11,172	15,269	16,502	18,944	21,770	25,158	30,471
Poland *	27,665	30,630	33,866	40,088	44,981	47,893	53,394	59,219	67,066	75,076
Portugal *	8,000	9,081	11,086	14,892	17,274	19,096	20,064	21,151	23,179	26,265
Puerto Rico *	5,647	6,329	7,002	7,685	8,198	8,969	9,911	11,165	12,750	14,436
Qatar *	539	714	1,030	1,503	1,935	2,470	3,206	3,509	3,932	5,633
Romania *	12,712	15,081	17,399	20,272	21,233	22,874	25,709	27,790	32,761	35,353
Rwanda *	241	289	326	404	530	639	712	834	1,012	1,239
Saint Kitts and Nevis *	21	25	30	31	41	43	37	38	43	50
Saint Lucia *	30	35	40	45	61	71	73	81	95	115
Saint Vincent and the Grenadines *	21	23	32	35	38	38	37	43	54	63
Samoa *	40	48	56	74	83	83	76	87	96	109
San Marino *	78	85	99	120	136	156	154	176	215	269
São Tomé and Príncipe *	38	38	42	56	58	61	52	50	55	66
Saudi Arabia *	5,377	7,185	9,664	14,947	45,413	46,773	64,006	74,189	80,267	111,858
Senegal *	952	984	1,190	1,368	1,543	2,078	2,107	2,157	2,403	2,998
Seychelles *	23	27	38	46	53	59	61	80	106	157
Sierra Leone *	451	480	529	604	695	743	690	787	1,015	1,170
Singapore *	1,919	2,270	2,950	4,228	5,261	5,787	6,066	6,694	8,048	9,702
Solomon Islands *	32	35	38	51	73	65	72	82	98	130
Somalia *	341	347	448	484	573	757	871	441	500	514
South Africa *	17,907	19,765	20,753	28,445	35,729	36,948	35,475	39,400	45,328	55,937
Soviet Union *	433,412	455,576	515,797	617,777	616,593	685,972	688,530	738,417	840,139	901,616
Spain *	39,801	45,263	57,417	76,365	94,447	111,435	115,065	128,590	155,939	208,351
Sri Lanka *	2,460	2,518	2,812	3,060	3,809	3,941	3,749	4,242	2,907	3,550
Sudan *	1,234	1,339	1,659	2,134	2,600	3,242	4,043	4,751	5,112	5,646
Suriname *	356	389	424	465	562	638	693	879	1,008	1,072
Swaziland *	123	157	161	220	268	329	309	346	387	469
Sweden *	35,404	38,633	45,499	55,213	61,354	77,036	83,056	87,801	97,072	114,679
Switzerland *	22,953	27,583	33,831	45,496	52,433	60,111	62,874	67,152	93,912	105,563
Syria *	1,756	2,063	2,381	2,550	4,090	5,311	6,388	6,991	8,384	10,077
Tanzania *	1,906	2,039	2,321	2,770	3,326	3,829	4,147	4,955	5,934	6,282
Thailand *	7,374	7,676	8,509	11,280	14,261	15,489	17,677	20,585	24,984	28,483
Togo *	265	298	347	406	543	599	570	687	851	1,016
Tonga *	17	19	23	34	46	43	39	45	54	58
Trinidad and Tobago *	822	897	1,084	1,309	2,042	2,443	2,501	3,139	3,563	4,603
Tunisia *	1,588	1,859	2,468	3,012	3,912	4,775	4,973	5,637	6,584	7,930
Turkey *	24,444	23,057	28,975	36,385	50,191	62,735	71,763	81,839	90,347	123,319
Turks and Caicos Islands	10	11	12	14	16	18	20	23	25	29
Tuvalu *	3	3	3	4	4	4	4	4	4	4
Uganda *	1,316	1,456	1,582	1,851	2,242	2,524	2,668	2,876	2,955	2,801
United Arab Emirates *	1,053	1,443	2,173	4,213	11,617	14,721	19,213	24,872	23,776	31,226
United Kingdom *	124,970	141,314	162,369	183,201	197,882	236,514	227,217	256,596	325,244	422,476
United States *	1,024,800	1,113,100	1,225,000	1,369,300	1,485,900	1,623,400	1,809,100	2,013,600	2,276,000	2,543,500
Uruguay *	2,538	3,049	2,450	3,129	4,334	3,825	4,007	4,488	5,377	7,698
Vanuatu *	38	41	55	67	67	81	78	82	100	132
Venezuela *	13,830	15,190	16,730	19,926	30,530	32,125	36,751	42,355	45,987	56,508
Vietnam *	2,775	3,024	3,237	3,350	3,605	3,896	4,541	5,413	6,532	7,140
North Yemen	398	471	687	624	759	927	1,021	1,178	1,305	1,444
South Yemen	154	142	159	130	138	141	183	226	272	293
Yugoslavia *	14,554	15,802	16,485	21,472	29,706	33,279	37,563	45,673	54,338	68,198
Zambia *	1,544	1,574	1,852	2,350	2,895	2,658	2,814	2,767	3,098	3,827
Zimbabwe *	2,023	2,339	2,888	3,552	4,274	4,692	4,637	4,683	4,686	5,559

== IMF estimates ==
=== 1980s ===
IMF estimates (1980s)
Country / territory	1980	1981	1982	1983	1984	1985	1986	1987	1988	1989
Afghanistan										
Albania	1,946	2,229	2,296	2,319	2,290	2,339	2,587	2,566	2,530	2,779
Algeria	45,957	48,156	48,599	51,582	55,906	66,346	66,783	68,698	56,070	57,041
Andorra										
Angola	8,730	8,170	8,170	8,514	9,025	11,119	10,411	11,900	12,909	15,017
Antigua and Barbuda	132	149	166	185	212	246	298	347	411	455
Argentina	233,696	189,802	94,250	116,267	130,544	98,599	118,565	121,561	142,386	91,352
Armenia										
Aruba										
Australia	163,132	188,650	187,287	179,706	197,387	174,607	181,708	213,371	271,433	308,788
Austria	80,481	69,738	69,727	70,644	66,640	68,248	96,842	121,104	132,860	132,534
Azerbaijan										
Bahamas	2,598	2,692	3,031	3,373	3,603	3,923	4,241	4,669	4,855	5,473
Bahrain	3,745	4,228	4,445	4,554	4,727	4,460	3,490	3,780	4,672	4,873
Bangladesh	24,775	26,355	24,678	23,904	26,817	28,819	29,639	32,449	34,914	38,070
Barbados	1,108	1,219	1,274	1,352	1,474	1,542	1,693	1,865	1,983	2,195
Belarus										
Belgium	123,479	102,245	89,959	85,037	81,237	84,468	117,063	145,412	158,098	159,817
Belize	229	238	238	251	280	278	302	354	418	482
Benin	2,302	1,557	1,542	1,365	1,456	1,580	2,036	2,430	2,552	2,370
Bhutan	132	143	150	162	168	174	197	238	273	272
Bolivia	3,774	3,617	4,009	3,795	3,945	4,268	4,175	4,546	4,835	4,959
Bosnia and Herzegovina										
Botswana	1,174	1,037	1,094	1,208	1,200	1,117	1,515	2,374	3,082	3,441
Brazil	145,819	167,583	179,166	143,652	142,957	226,938	263,256	286,539	320,105	439,434
Brunei						4,831	3,291	3,872	3,689	4,109
Bulgaria	37,751	40,718	42,467	43,641	46,358	39,692	35,130	40,721	66,546	67,774
Burkina Faso	2,386	2,076	1,934	1,767	1,579	1,746	2,290	2,665	2,942	2,942
Burundi	1,106	1,151	1,216	1,287	1,170	1,362	1,435	1,352	1,267	1,316
Cape Verde	157	187	149	144	146	164	212	264	322	332
Cambodia							205	141	276	346
Cameroon	8,850	10,026	9,616	9,692	10,243	10,698	13,945	16,152	16,403	14,626
Canada	276,064	307,246	314,639	341,863	356,728	366,184	379,015	433,140	509,380	567,225
Central African Republic	1,405	1,462	1,415	1,357	1,319	1,737	2,277	2,540	2,737	2,894
Chad	958	1,133	1,095	1,096	1,177	1,275	1,570	1,780	2,081	1,966
Chile	29,032	34,374	25,630	20,819	20,246	17,360	18,662	22,010	25,947	29,889
China	306,687	290,054	284,458	305,340	314,328	310,399	301,063	327,676	408,555	457,105
Colombia	46,501	50,661	54,252	53,920	53,257	48,581	48,648	50,640	54,592	55,048
Comoros	243	213	202	196	189	192	258	313	336	329
Democratic Republic of the Congo	68,606	59,726	64,939	52,378	34,951	31,943	35,840	33,932	39,314	40,006
Republic of the Congo	2,165	1,775	1,548	1,407	1,294	1,327	1,815	2,205	2,346	2,478
Costa Rica	4,854	2,636	2,619	3,162	3,678	3,941	4,425	4,554	4,636	5,250
Ivory Coast	13,877	11,502	10,320	9,312	9,284	9,470	12,675	13,944	14,092	13,487
Croatia										
Cyprus	2,314	2,242	2,319	2,321	2,447	2,611	3,317	3,979	4,589	4,901
Czech Republic										
Denmark	70,811	61,460	60,084	60,331	58,869	62,452	87,749	109,183	115,540	112,312
Djibouti										
Dominica	73	82	90	99	109	119	135	152	171	185
Dominican Republic	8,672	9,698	9,141	9,461	14,870	6,496	7,891	8,305	7,605	8,589
Ecuador	16,116	16,501	16,474	14,478	15,408	18,020	13,222	12,355	11,749	11,531
Egypt	23,523	25,760	30,479	37,254	41,888	48,841	54,076	77,359	92,530	115,362
El Salvador	3,912	3,449	3,406	3,261	2,385	2,319	2,335	2,374	2,771	3,167
Equatorial Guinea	32	30	35	40	44	74	91	111	119	105
Eritrea										
Estonia										
Eswatini	732	775	693	713	610	482	617	807	958	977
Ethiopia	7,385	7,578	7,973	8,863	8,375	9,808	10,188	10,890	11,285	11,872
Fiji	1,303	1,339	1,293	1,217	1,276	1,236	1,398	1,276	1,202	1,281
Finland	53,714	52,620	53,111	51,056	53,032	56,223	73,652	91,775	109,255	119,106
France	695,475	612,552	581,254	555,956	526,671	551,596	766,302	927,257	1,012,843	1,017,702
Gabon	4,559	4,111	3,853	3,689	3,547	3,736	4,889	3,699	4,079	4,458
Gambia	606	580	547	550	396	482	376	504	585	614
Georgia										
Germany	856,833	720,895	696,088	694,447	654,289	663,459	947,583	1,179,165	1,271,263	1,262,000
Ghana	38,684	61,487	70,954	49,337	17,998	15,970	15,086	12,692	13,566	13,723
Greece	56,217	51,873	54,114	48,913	47,657	47,269	55,636	64,769	75,384	78,148
Grenada	111	116	125	132	146	168	188	215	236	267
Guatemala	7,718	8,431	8,539	8,864	9,276	10,951	5,921	6,857	7,426	8,561
Guinea	2,687	2,665	2,614	2,557	2,605	2,768	2,995	3,180	3,714	3,788
Guinea-Bissau	289	370	421	475	330	485	474	401	374	449
Guyana	842	808	692	703	654	697	789	728	828	832
Haiti	2,664	2,932	3,050	3,273	3,627	4,028	4,475	2,205	1,450	1,340
Honduras	3,968	4,044	4,267	4,477	4,915	5,278	5,678	6,191	6,877	7,877
Hong Kong	28,862	31,055	32,291	29,907	33,511	35,700	41,076	50,623	59,708	68,790
Hungary	23,117	23,706	24,142	21,910	21,243	21,511	24,778	27,233	29,800	30,423
Iceland	3,528	3,642	3,347	2,876	2,971	3,096	4,132	5,733	6,345	5,881
India	186,170	193,153	200,035	218,218	211,843	233,520	248,398	278,864	294,479	296,043
Indonesia	99,296	110,848	113,799	103,149	107,218	107,062	101,220	95,214	107,279	122,582
Iran	116,976	123,852	153,533	191,522	197,372	220,341	254,987	338,089	380,698	463,073
Iraq										
Ireland	21,425	20,423	21,313	20,618	19,883	21,168	28,516	33,660	36,875	38,030
Israel	24,958	26,445	28,342	31,608	29,923	27,812	34,238	40,894	50,658	51,543
Italy	479,967	435,267	430,169	446,399	441,048	455,457	645,071	809,632	897,006	932,931
Jamaica	2,631	2,891	3,319	2,950	2,174	2,045	2,431	2,741	3,267	3,788
Japan	1,155,182	1,273,672	1,185,206	1,299,897	1,376,575	1,459,625	2,168,525	2,639,715	3,197,143	3,180,501
Jordan	4,344	4,878	5,206	5,471	5,527	5,559	7,119	7,504	7,030	4,727
Kazakhstan										
Kenya	13,449	12,667	12,196	11,279	11,703	11,646	13,832	15,163	15,721	15,586
Kiribati	33	35	33	31	34	26	26	30	38	38
South Korea	66,517	74,287	79,912	89,621	99,750	103,764	119,966	152,241	205,479	254,236
Kosovo										
Kuwait		25,249	21,583	20,871	21,700	21,445	17,904	22,368	20,690	24,313
Kyrgyzstan										
Laos	1,913	1,118	1,119	2,047	2,930	3,685	2,577	1,815	1,182	1,460
Latvia										
Lebanon	4,020	3,843	2,621	3,611	4,269	3,566	2,780	3,254	3,269	2,682
Lesotho	428	435	362	401	360	288	331	434	496	519
Liberia										
Libya	40,190	34,720	34,616	32,988	30,890	30,384	24,756	23,009	25,870	27,446
Liechtenstein										
Lithuania										
Luxembourg	6,434	5,549	4,557	4,473	4,385	4,544	6,611	8,211	9,301	9,903
Macau										
Madagascar	5,202	4,759	4,785	4,686	3,906	3,803	4,348	3,213	3,189	3,176
Malawi	3,022	3,022	2,881	2,986	2,949	2,762	2,883	2,834	3,258	3,715
Malaysia	26,757	27,321	29,278	32,745	37,087	34,090	30,303	34,529	37,845	41,678
Maldives	63	73	87	94	113	134	158	149	178	201
Mali	2,704	2,235	1,680	1,497	1,388	1,595	2,126	2,449	2,712	3,310
Malta										
Marshall Islands										
Mauritania										
Mauritius	1,242	1,179	1,131	1,198	1,108	1,122	1,515	1,919	2,225	2,286
Mexico	242,153	311,012	225,706	184,010	217,001	230,272	159,434	174,840	213,893	260,663
Federated States of Micronesia										
Moldova										
Mongolia	2,728	2,854	2,963	3,071	2,837	3,294	3,636	4,086	4,104	4,275
Montenegro										
Morocco	23,807	19,329	19,510	17,635	16,130	16,280	21,497	23,713	28,080	28,901
Mozambique	4,615	3,585	3,662	3,280	3,417	4,516	5,301	2,395	2,105	2,199
Myanmar										
Namibia										2,268
Nauru										
Nepal	2,258	2,641	2,669	2,920	3,089	3,208	3,491	3,621	4,270	4,317
Netherlands	194,031	162,629	157,560	153,396	142,779	144,859	201,883	247,277	264,596	260,900
New Zealand	22,551	23,472	23,237	22,484	22,377	22,539	27,428	36,978	45,505	44,132
Nicaragua	1,832	2,156	2,497	2,900	3,966	3,854	5,800	3,409	1,499	2,082
Niger	3,531	3,056	2,840	2,538	2,056	2,027	2,680	3,143	3,210	3,068
Nigeria										
North Macedonia										
Norway	64,177	63,393	62,453	61,418	61,866	65,211	78,438	93,914	101,498	102,227
Oman	7,269	8,849	9,285	9,733	10,726	11,916	9,433	9,890	9,613	10,743
Pakistan	38,616	45,681	49,932	46,619	50,612	50,607	51,827	54,171	62,385	65,042
Palau										
Panama	3,759	4,255	4,701	4,827	5,038	5,330	5,539	5,563	4,809	4,822
Papua New Guinea	4,087	4,011	3,805	3,799	3,509	3,250	3,535	3,885	5,400	5,238
Paraguay	4,095	5,220	5,470	6,069	4,931	4,214	5,032	4,216	5,584	4,046
Peru	20,190	24,398	24,259	18,863	19,442	16,823	25,241	41,681	32,978	40,699
Philippines	37,082	40,735	42,441	37,953	35,860	34,973	34,129	37,932	43,293	48,652
Poland	56,908	53,921	65,520	75,792	75,893	71,137	74,053	64,040	68,963	67,237
Portugal	32,607	32,477	30,678	28,267	25,951	27,231	37,869	47,386	55,435	59,806
Puerto Rico	14,436	15,956	16,764	17,277	19,163	20,289	21,969	23,878	26,178	28,267
Qatar	6,665	7,374	6,467	5,506	5,708	5,339	4,214	4,441	4,260	4,502
Romania	46,053	55,319	55,375	48,401	39,111	48,286	52,290	58,477	60,538	54,236
Russia										
Rwanda	1,493	1,695	1,808	1,932	1,851	2,199	2,490	2,765	2,959	3,090
Samoa	127	119	122	113	111	106	112	124	138	141
San Marino										
São Tomé and Príncipe	69	84	81	76	79	83	117	117	100	99
Saudi Arabia	164,540	184,292	153,240	129,181	119,631	103,894	86,886	85,582	88,138	95,217
Senegal	4,338	3,934	3,850	3,435	3,350	3,668	5,188	6,241	6,173	6,083
Serbia										
Seychelles	147	154	148	147	151	169	208	249	284	305
Sierra Leone	2,708	2,903	3,264	2,838	3,283	2,794	2,092	1,823	2,988	2,745
Singapore	12,082	14,367	15,879	18,011	19,563	18,573	18,780	21,629	26,551	31,436
Slovakia										
Slovenia										
Solomon Islands	217	230	229	215	215	196	175	184	209	205
Somalia										
South Africa	89,412	93,150	85,897	96,205	84,838	64,481	73,399	96,533	104,010	108,070
South Sudan										
Spain	231,048	204,843	197,890	173,072	172,597	181,847	251,618	318,787	374,535	413,106
Sri Lanka	5,194	5,404	5,834	6,298	7,382	7,302	7,826	8,149	8,518	8,550
Saint Kitts and Nevis	58	69	79	78	91	101	119	136	161	179
Saint Lucia	170	194	183	197	251	284	340	375	429	486
Saint Vincent and the Grenadines	89	110	123	132	146	157	174	190	217	232
Sudan	9,095	6,530	4,748	6,485	7,992	5,547	7,400	11,964	9,551	16,853
Suriname	1,276	1,427	1,469	1,419	1,387	1,402	1,430	1,573	1,864	2,177
Sweden	140,151	127,935	112,912	103,682	107,978	112,932	149,282	181,810	205,868	216,543
Switzerland	124,313	113,960	116,759	116,347	111,030	112,716	161,560	202,276	218,596	211,298
Syria	12,980	16,652	17,415	18,649	19,171	21,177	25,428	32,497	16,538	9,849
Taiwan	42,285	48,969	49,535	54,148	61,071	63,617	78,195	105,039	126,473	152,704
Tajikistan										
Tanzania	10,873	13,005	14,932	15,294	13,915	12,556	15,874	7,821	7,474	6,444
Thailand	33,422	35,999	37,799	41,366	43,179	40,185	44,520	52,204	63,704	74,637
Timor-Leste										
Togo	1,921	1,616	1,396	1,330	1,222	1,281	1,795	2,107	2,345	2,302
Tonga	71	79	79	77	81	76	90	98	115	139
Trinidad and Tobago	6,343	7,113	8,280	7,898	7,891	7,503	4,877	4,880	4,574	4,397
Tunisia	9,566	9,223	8,900	9,202	9,054	9,245	9,910	10,663	11,073	11,069
Turkey	96,629	97,898	88,948	84,996	82,670	92,858	102,371	118,966	125,075	147,777
Turkmenistan										
Tuvalu										
Uganda	7,486	12,120	8,410	9,619	7,399	6,771	6,746	10,878	11,268	9,136
Ukraine										
United Arab Emirates	41,725	46,461	43,205	39,588	39,245	38,519	30,526	33,519	34,069	39,325
United Kingdom	602,271	586,740	557,877	531,614	503,818	536,103	653,788	812,899	988,710	1,006,990
United States	2,857,325	3,207,025	3,343,800	3,634,025	4,037,650	4,339,000	4,579,625	4,855,250	5,236,425	5,641,600
Uruguay	12,217	13,636	11,147	6,119	5,819	5,686	7,059	8,832	9,137	9,630
Uzbekistan										
Vanuatu	134	126	127	130	160	146	141	154	175	170
Venezuela	69,841	78,367	79,998	79,672	57,826	59,865	60,877	46,854	60,378	44,672
Vietnam	35,357	17,617	23,369	35,204	61,171	19,045	43,009	53,385	29,501	7,991
Palestine										
Yemen										
Zambia	4,246	4,385	4,232	3,653	3,003	2,848	1,962	2,431	4,095	4,365
Zimbabwe										

=== 1990s ===
IMF estimates (1990s)
Country / territory	1990	1991	1992	1993	1994	1995	1996	1997	1998	1999
Afghanistan										
Albania	2,221	1,333	843	1,461	2,361	2,882	3,200	2,225	2,555	3,226
Algeria	67,171	50,650	53,414	55,309	46,044	45,654	50,945	52,287	52,297	53,011
Andorra										
Angola	16,529	16,022	12,354	8,966	6,529	8,148	10,510	12,344	10,464	9,895
Antigua and Barbuda	479	504	525	566	625	616	679	734	790	836
Argentina	158,024	211,979	255,787	264,429	287,835	288,497	304,282	327,436	334,244	316,998
Armenia			108	835	648	1,287	1,597	1,639	1,892	1,845
Aruba						1,321	1,380	1,532	1,665	1,723
Australia	324,557	324,883	318,439	309,732	353,884	379,778	425,319	427,122	382,165	412,711
Austria	165,953	173,481	194,436	189,342	202,854	239,914	236,044	211,978	217,363	216,637
Azerbaijan			1,193	1,309	2,258	2,417	3,177	4,317	4,280	4,581
Bahamas	5,218	5,128	5,125	5,097	5,372	5,653	5,950	6,332	6,833	7,684
Bahrain	5,176	5,430	5,673	6,241	6,683	7,075	7,357	7,629	7,293	7,905
Bangladesh	41,068	42,488	43,292	43,684	46,438	51,842	55,445	57,599	59,879	61,526
Barbados	2,202	2,211	2,129	2,257	2,354	2,481	2,657	2,818	3,230	3,392
Belarus			12,800	11,408	15,687	10,532	14,494	14,091	15,215	12,133
Belgium	200,150	205,370	228,733	218,721	238,623	288,302	279,292	253,022	258,876	258,503
Belize	547	597	696	752	772	819	850	873	929	1,000
Benin	2,890	2,954	3,284	3,199	2,227	2,993	3,251	3,124	3,362	3,681
Bhutan	293	254	248	260	263	308	324	362	398	418
Bolivia	5,118	5,657	6,022	6,152	6,430	7,255	8,036	8,702	9,439	9,206
Bosnia and Herzegovina							3,584	4,578	5,281	5,766
Botswana	3,799	3,802	3,928	3,957	4,258	4,805	4,926	5,011	4,808	5,413
Brazil	455,335	399,249	382,465	429,184	546,764	770,860	851,146	883,862	864,307	599,642
Brunei	4,923	5,254	5,526	5,588	6,002	7,153	7,204	7,043	5,353	5,779
Bulgaria	29,882	2,928	11,882	6,449	11,338	18,992	12,295	11,317	15,031	13,660
Burkina Faso	3,488	3,526	3,775	3,599	2,164	2,676	2,909	2,753	3,155	3,388
Burundi	1,316	1,358	1,260	1,092	1,076	1,164	1,011	1,131	1,039	999
Cape Verde	413	443	479	431	450	570	611	609	648	693
Cambodia	899	2,011	2,439	2,427	2,765	3,441	3,507	3,443	3,130	3,513
Cameroon	14,641	16,325	14,963	15,611	10,622	10,075	11,227	11,352	11,338	11,553
Canada	596,089	612,514	594,376	579,059	579,913	605,941	630,598	655,010	634,004	678,417
Central African Republic	3,308	3,249	3,250	2,996	1,947	2,442	2,175	2,048	2,109	2,172
Chad	2,369	2,347	2,446	2,138	1,732	2,123	2,360	2,268	2,561	2,256
Chile	33,231	38,249	46,597	49,855	57,517	74,119	78,575	85,730	81,996	75,596
China	395,334	414,609	494,970	621,665	566,932	738,192	868,521	967,756	1,037,116	1,103,837
Colombia	56,071	57,954	68,579	77,721	97,665	110,564	116,130	127,490	117,725	103,132
Comoros	402	401	437	428	315	393	392	363	364	372
Democratic Republic of the Congo	41,448	40,250	36,333	47,450	25,746	25,021	32,099	28,819	21,089	19,147
Republic of the Congo	2,909	3,035	3,280	3,004	2,068	2,457	2,840	2,568	2,240	2,646
Costa Rica	5,737	7,197	8,566	9,586	10,489	11,578	11,683	12,618	13,688	14,259
Ivory Coast	14,923	14,504	15,416	15,268	11,492	15,205	16,780	16,203	17,433	17,114
Croatia			568	7,358	16,669	20,657	22,104	22,101	23,971	23,593
Cyprus	6,003	6,195	7,424	7,098	8,004	9,937	10,016	9,544	10,251	10,502
Czech Republic						60,565	67,805	62,530	67,161	65,586
Denmark	138,219	139,182	152,966	143,110	156,019	184,850	187,482	173,242	176,876	177,887
Djibouti	635	650	672	655	691	699	694	706	722	759
Dominica	201	220	234	246	264	275	292	303	322	332
Dominican Republic	7,995	9,887	11,605	13,081	14,645	16,637	18,242	20,017	21,672	22,137
Ecuador	11,710	13,139	14,367	16,783	20,238	21,980	23,001	25,847	26,292	18,891
Egypt	96,087	48,431	44,168	49,526	54,550	63,250	71,118	79,777	89,189	95,039
El Salvador	4,818	5,252	5,813	6,680	7,679	8,922	9,586	10,222	10,937	11,284
Equatorial Guinea	133	132	160	162	120	169	276	526	440	738
Eritrea			606	374	433	483	579	594	626	614
Estonia				1,791	2,507	3,909	4,785	5,160	5,678	5,771
Eswatini	1,201	1,247	1,384	1,453	1,574	1,876	1,776	1,900	1,744	1,712
Ethiopia	12,595	13,928	14,696	9,143	8,135	8,431	8,826	8,909	8,078	7,927
Fiji	1,448	1,500	1,659	1,772	1,977	2,134	2,307	2,268	1,795	2,104
Finland	141,726	128,215	113,139	89,177	103,621	134,210	132,046	127,027	134,164	135,369
France	1,260,874	1,263,244	1,392,563	1,315,795	1,388,477	1,596,250	1,599,248	1,451,058	1,498,974	1,488,392
Gabon	6,339	5,754	5,955	5,757	4,463	5,281	6,064	5,673	4,774	4,966
Gambia	721	760	820	878	870	909	949	983	1,009	1,036
Georgia					850	1,961	3,148	3,608	3,730	2,898
Germany	1,604,497	1,882,489	2,146,140	2,080,092	2,220,165	2,595,269	2,507,448	2,221,504	2,250,847	2,216,072
Ghana	15,882	17,795	17,666	14,532	13,433	15,692	16,629	17,024	18,528	19,165
Greece	96,601	104,164	114,846	107,506	115,055	135,036	142,513	138,930	139,821	143,693
Grenada	278	301	310	310	325	342	367	392	446	482
Guatemala	7,535	9,174	10,138	11,045	12,482	14,050	14,992	16,982	18,461	17,422
Guinea	4,154	4,697	5,117	5,108	5,270	5,754	6,045	6,011	5,767	5,633
Guinea-Bissau	548	772	846	653	361	778	741	704	592	580
Guyana	685	744	823	1,003	1,176	1,332	1,495	1,587	1,500	1,488
Haiti	1,706	1,530	918	1,107	3,054	4,846	5,000	5,748	6,408	7,148
Honduras	4,923	4,649	4,944	4,961	4,642	5,415	5,217	5,736	6,366	6,417
Hong Kong	76,929	88,960	104,272	120,354	135,812	144,652	159,718	177,349	168,858	165,734
Hungary	34,478	34,867	38,857	40,256	43,308	46,578	46,834	47,399	48,784	49,160
Iceland	6,709	7,174	7,343	6,439	6,611	7,373	7,687	7,717	8,638	9,108
India	320,979	270,105	288,210	279,295	327,275	360,281	392,902	415,895	421,378	458,821
Indonesia	138,258	154,558	168,280	190,913	213,727	244,227	274,722	260,680	115,323	169,158
Iran	709,094	371,097	61,598	78,656	97,415	140,280	192,871	224,733	250,194	335,737
Iraq										
Ireland	48,199	48,840	54,911	51,364	55,843	69,260	75,928	82,957	90,305	98,993
Israel	60,821	68,994	77,096	77,486	88,451	105,076	114,751	119,070	120,024	120,914
Italy	1,164,328	1,229,898	1,305,099	1,049,470	1,082,455	1,177,987	1,315,135	1,246,342	1,274,382	1,256,250
Jamaica	4,784	4,396	4,440	5,581	5,594	6,719	7,586	8,618	9,015	9,118
Japan	3,258,697	3,731,419	4,071,656	4,640,603	5,104,062	5,639,651	5,021,444	4,579,783	4,150,360	4,688,982
Jordan	4,625	4,830	5,968	6,202	6,982	7,466	7,792	8,162	9,017	9,294
Kazakhstan			2,875	5,152	11,881	16,639	21,035	22,166	22,135	16,871
Kenya	16,219	15,315	15,084	10,479	12,546	15,905	18,064	18,300	20,630	18,594
Kiribati	37	41	62	59	67	69	81	80	75	77
South Korea	292,064	340,863	366,912	405,772	478,988	586,301	631,194	590,070	396,803	515,427
Kosovo										
Kuwait	18,239	10,791	19,871	23,955	24,859	27,186	31,491	30,350	25,941	30,126
Kyrgyzstan			917	665	1,108	1,493	1,822	1,767	1,630	1,242
Laos	1,742	2,053	2,354	2,652	3,081	3,579	3,726	3,515	1,334	1,415
Latvia			1,641	2,643	4,391	5,242	5,799	6,351	6,977	7,325
Lebanon	2,801	4,392	5,472	7,435	8,988	10,971	12,824	15,535	17,059	17,174
Lesotho	635	743	863	865	915	1,032	977	1,027	949	937
Liberia										
Libya	31,627	34,995	35,459	31,912	29,719	33,739	36,827	37,702	30,921	37,129
Liechtenstein										
Lithuania						6,742	8,440	10,159	11,284	11,017
Luxembourg	12,628	13,683	15,328	15,714	17,487	20,571	20,464	18,428	19,263	21,089
Macau										
Madagascar	3,931	3,255	3,715	4,063	3,522	3,838	4,932	4,263	4,402	4,278
Malawi	4,222	5,380	4,394	5,055	2,930	3,412	5,569	6,504	4,275	4,336
Malaysia	47,245	53,519	64,427	72,857	81,156	96,606	109,846	109,116	78,639	86,203
Maldives	231	262	306	346	382	466	527	652	693	756
Mali	3,248	3,589	3,689	3,637	2,708	3,339	3,722	3,383	3,868	4,069
Malta						3,353	3,419	3,461	3,667	3,827
Marshall Islands								110	112	113
Mauritania	1,793	2,055	2,164	1,847	1,945	2,092	2,132	2,072	2,027	1,986
Mauritius	2,743	3,017	3,398	3,502	3,887	4,439	4,590	4,310	4,354	4,597
Mexico	307,613	368,772	427,661	530,226	553,618	380,182	432,158	523,450	557,485	631,240
Federated States of Micronesia						222	221	207	219	220
Moldova			864	1,110	1,158	1,441	1,694	1,928	1,697	1,172
Mongolia	2,678	2,821	1,566	771	926	1,452	1,348	1,181	1,125	1,057
Montenegro										
Morocco	32,661	34,940	36,483	34,259	38,532	42,238	46,710	42,366	45,243	45,055
Mozambique	3,529	3,855	2,799	2,883	2,958	3,062	4,030	4,874	5,551	6,285
Myanmar									5,122	6,400
Namibia	2,568	2,841	3,296	3,156	3,537	3,948	3,954	4,110	3,832	3,824
Nauru										
Nepal	4,442	4,861	4,417	4,743	4,954	5,379	5,544	6,027	5,992	6,164
Netherlands	321,859	331,565	366,520	356,434	383,091	453,377	451,508	418,023	439,215	448,223
New Zealand	45,722	43,440	41,515	44,807	52,920	62,241	69,100	68,869	56,815	58,898
Nicaragua	519	3,678	3,894	3,726	3,861	4,140	4,308	4,390	4,635	4,856
Niger	3,491	3,271	3,372	3,041	1,935	2,296	2,397	2,285	2,639	2,532
Nigeria	87,542	84,676	73,614	79,996	112,837	186,207	243,178	264,554	295,269	80,940
North Macedonia			2,443	2,687	3,561	4,687	4,643	3,928	3,764	3,867
Norway	119,344	121,149	129,999	119,841	126,325	151,085	162,428	160,014	152,956	161,305
Oman	13,395	13,000	14,274	14,321	14,808	15,821	17,512	18,154	16,044	17,833
Pakistan	65,276	74,158	79,338	83,969	84,642	98,917	103,296	101,848	101,381	96,008
Palau										
Panama	5,242	5,764	6,553	7,156	7,631	7,800	9,198	10,059	11,020	11,661
Papua New Guinea	4,757	5,596	6,466	7,349	8,077	7,149	7,608	7,272	5,558	5,072
Paraguay	4,904	6,984	7,158	7,249	7,871	9,062	9,788	9,965	9,260	8,837
Peru	28,326	33,988	35,026	34,032	43,217	51,365	53,260	56,076	53,533	48,460
Philippines	50,508	51,784	60,422	62,037	73,159	84,644	94,650	94,106	74,492	85,640
Poland	62,401	80,863	89,166	90,828	104,213	139,800	157,485	157,987	172,929	168,657
Portugal	79,439	89,904	108,119	95,139	99,692	118,182	122,655	117,211	124,124	127,597
Puerto Rico	30,604	32,287	34,630	36,923	39,691	42,647	45,341	48,187	54,086	57,841
Qatar	6,266	5,579	6,384	5,804	5,946	6,861	7,761	9,976	8,488	11,266
Romania	38,516	29,070	19,779	26,624	30,376	35,838	35,692	35,644	42,543	35,953
Russia			71,603	196,227	293,768	335,777	412,685	433,704	287,672	209,657
Rwanda	2,954	2,179	2,313	2,231	1,418	1,470	1,593	2,144	2,290	2,131
Samoa	182	176	193	198	158	242	258	280	286	262
San Marino										
São Tomé and Príncipe	120	108	96	127	132	104	136	93	73	78
Saudi Arabia	117,474	132,047	136,905	132,790	134,995	143,152	158,451	165,742	146,776	161,717
Senegal	7,078	6,955	7,435	7,014	4,746	6,026	6,300	5,867	6,416	6,599
Serbia								24,995	20,001	12,893
Seychelles	369	374	434	474	486	508	503	563	608	623
Sierra Leone	1,509	1,812	1,580	1,786	2,118	2,026	2,188	1,974	1,562	1,555
Singapore	38,892	45,465	52,131	60,604	73,689	87,813	96,293	100,124	85,728	86,287
Slovakia				13,906	16,046	20,297	21,871	22,037	22,917	20,890
Slovenia			19,285	16,638	16,857	21,399	21,480	20,769	22,080	22,668
Solomon Islands	255	270	319	356	477	556	605	624	542	578
Somalia										
South Africa	126,027	135,227	146,970	147,236	153,569	171,736	163,340	169,004	152,885	151,426
South Sudan										
Spain	536,322	577,166	630,910	529,980	531,801	614,713	642,480	590,500	619,541	635,025
Sri Lanka	9,787	10,716	11,553	12,351	14,245	15,127	16,592	18,544	19,050	19,143
Saint Kitts and Nevis	203	201	223	243	272	293	312	351	366	389
Saint Lucia	579	613	674	684	713	762	788	805	877	921
Saint Vincent and the Grenadines	260	275	300	309	313	341	358	376	403	422
Sudan	2,245	2,528	3,100	5,246	5,961	6,694	8,377	10,241	10,924	10,714
Suriname	577	637	590	465	523	993	1,234	1,322	1,588	1,308
Sweden	259,299	271,721	282,441	212,644	228,700	267,052	291,952	268,250	270,888	274,317
Switzerland	269,875	273,072	283,941	276,310	305,911	358,241	345,470	298,948	306,840	301,715
Syria	12,303	12,738	13,263	13,796	15,105	16,556	17,761	16,573	16,144	16,785
Taiwan	166,622	187,140	222,911	236,339	256,247	279,059	292,494	303,284	279,964	303,830
Tajikistan			291	678	829	569	1,052	1,121	1,320	1,087
Tanzania	5,172	6,019	5,588	5,170	5,478	6,382	7,889	9,341	11,481	11,777
Thailand	88,467	101,247	115,576	128,889	146,684	169,279	183,035	150,180	113,676	126,669
Timor-Leste										
Togo	2,772	2,740	2,873	2,189	1,697	2,240	2,448	2,494	2,361	2,370
Tonga	144	169	178	183	189	207	218	222	212	197
Trinidad and Tobago	5,155	5,399	5,533	4,656	5,032	5,421	5,859	5,837	6,148	6,926
Tunisia	14,133	14,897	17,809	16,724	17,886	20,616	22,324	21,762	22,870	24,066
Turkey	207,578	208,473	219,250	248,657	179,420	233,645	250,571	261,946	277,693	254,300
Turkmenistan			886	4,997	4,232	5,473	2,217	2,498	2,667	3,594
Tuvalu										
Uganda	7,452	3,897	3,645	4,311	6,240	7,473	7,713	8,407	8,230	7,823
Ukraine		515,517	21,461	32,713	36,755	37,009	44,559	50,152	41,883	31,581
United Arab Emirates	50,682	49,300	51,952	52,144	57,395	63,432	72,853	77,167	75,304	84,420
United Kingdom	1,196,189	1,247,353	1,288,320	1,154,133	1,240,756	1,343,786	1,420,944	1,562,664	1,654,142	1,686,582
United States	5,963,125	6,158,125	6,520,325	6,858,550	7,287,250	7,639,750	8,073,125	8,577,550	9,062,825	9,631,175
Uruguay	11,204	13,502	15,515	18,064	21,040	23,267	24,730	26,155	27,704	26,178
Uzbekistan			4,971	7,659	9,078	14,155	19,382	20,471	20,810	23,724
Vanuatu	187	223	231	222	259	276	289	302	290	296
Venezuela	48,391	53,382	60,400	59,865	58,357	77,427	70,536	85,684	91,836	97,517
Vietnam	8,217	9,704	12,528	16,736	20,712	26,407	31,352	34,146	34,580	36,444
Palestine					2,843	3,283	3,410	3,760	4,068	4,271
Yemen										
Zambia	4,085	3,690	3,614	3,549	3,657	3,799	3,599	4,303	3,538	3,405
Zimbabwe	14,988	13,962	11,515	11,184	11,760	12,209	14,949	15,345	17,876	17,388

=== 2000s ===
IMF estimates (2000s)
Country / territory	2000	2001	2002	2003	2004	2005	2006	2007	2008	2009
Afghanistan			4,367	4,553	5,146	6,167	6,925	8,556	10,297	12,066
Albania	3,488	3,927	4,356	5,561	7,177	8,052	8,896	10,677	12,881	12,044
Algeria	59,418	59,413	61,516	73,482	91,914	107,047	123,084	142,483	180,384	150,317
Andorra	1,429	1,547	1,758	2,362	2,896	3,158	3,456	3,952	4,082	3,675
Angola	12,646	12,378	17,312	20,342	26,998	41,397	58,654	73,038	98,790	81,705
Antigua and Barbuda	901	878	898	948	1,026	1,144	1,304	1,487	1,558	1,387
Argentina	317,759	300,421	112,458	142,431	164,911	199,273	232,892	287,921	363,545	334,633
Armenia	1,912	2,118	2,376	2,807	3,577	4,900	6,384	9,206	11,662	8,648
Aruba	1,873	1,896	1,962	2,044	2,255	2,360	2,470	2,678	2,843	2,554
Australia	401,053	378,786	426,225	542,013	659,807	737,715	784,846	951,924	1,059,501	1,004,205
Austria	196,268	196,479	212,687	260,714	299,075	314,126	333,924	386,806	429,187	398,857
Azerbaijan	5,273	5,475	6,232	7,276	8,682	13,239	20,983	33,050	48,852	44,297
Bahamas	8,076	8,318	8,881	8,870	9,055	9,836	10,167	10,618	10,526	9,982
Bahrain	9,448	9,579	10,001	11,545	13,709	16,647	19,291	22,653	26,803	23,913
Bangladesh	61,687	62,537	65,036	71,755	77,152	79,530	86,028	95,374	109,765	122,760
Barbados	3,499	3,494	3,554	3,676	3,966	4,451	4,969	5,572	5,708	5,351
Belarus	10,785	12,778	15,092	18,420	23,928	31,239	38,219	46,815	62,798	50,855
Belgium	236,897	236,748	258,200	318,004	369,047	385,927	408,281	470,978	517,271	484,488
Belize	1,138	1,172	1,244	1,308	1,400	1,474	1,590	1,706	1,738	1,688
Benin	3,522	3,666	4,191	5,348	6,187	6,571	7,034	8,170	9,787	9,728
Bhutan	454	474	517	616	700	818	876	1,071	1,359	1,273
Bolivia	9,371	9,100	8,895	9,056	9,790	10,750	12,897	14,910	19,078	20,071
Bosnia and Herzegovina	5,568	5,801	6,728	8,499	10,170	11,233	12,877	15,801	19,188	17,666
Botswana	5,682	5,460	5,395	7,469	8,819	9,833	9,919	10,566	10,731	10,118
Brazil	655,454	559,982	509,798	558,232	669,290	891,633	1,107,628	1,397,114	1,695,855	1,669,204
Brunei	6,650	6,206	6,475	7,266	8,723	10,561	12,710	13,571	15,949	11,892
Bulgaria	13,287	14,190	16,459	21,184	26,192	29,924	34,417	44,497	54,774	52,132
Burkina Faso	2,961	3,190	3,620	4,740	5,449	6,150	6,548	7,627	9,450	9,440
Burundi	989	983	907	844	952	1,117	1,273	1,356	1,612	1,775
Cape Verde	699	791	867	1,105	1,263	1,395	1,452	1,650	1,960	1,852
Cambodia	3,785	4,138	4,516	5,073	5,978	7,145	8,374	10,028	12,292	12,798
Cameroon	10,245	10,950	12,369	15,944	18,803	19,534	20,912	23,931	27,712	27,903
Canada	744,631	738,968	760,149	895,599	1,026,473	1,173,505	1,319,356	1,468,896	1,552,864	1,376,509
Central African Republic	1,402	1,492	1,589	1,811	2,035	2,154	2,351	2,703	2,992	2,942
Chad	2,039	2,512	2,928	4,025	6,490	8,660	9,710	10,867	13,384	12,304
Chile	78,250	71,517	70,295	76,508	99,079	122,315	153,840	172,565	179,663	171,794
China	1,223,770	1,355,048	1,489,832	1,683,911	1,984,197	2,318,292	2,792,072	3,605,730	4,669,735	5,189,893
Colombia	99,270	97,606	97,353	94,072	116,382	145,601	161,793	206,230	242,504	232,468
Comoros	340	373	427	547	622	656	689	796	916	904
Democratic Republic of the Congo	19,077	7,246	8,720	9,022	10,275	12,720	15,403	18,598	22,665	18,626
Republic of the Congo	3,624	3,038	3,330	3,863	5,101	6,654	8,073	8,784	11,649	9,713
Costa Rica	15,016	15,979	16,584	17,277	18,615	20,049	22,717	26,885	30,802	30,746
Ivory Coast	14,851	15,485	17,148	21,206	22,924	23,626	24,628	28,158	33,621	33,693
Croatia	22,145	23,068	26,739	35,240	41,818	45,035	49,584	59,295	68,461	62,251
Cyprus	9,988	10,397	11,422	14,552	17,328	18,713	20,422	24,082	27,955	26,020
Czech Republic	62,171	68,136	82,596	100,471	120,148	137,264	156,236	189,845	236,820	207,095
Denmark	164,043	164,881	178,788	218,422	251,988	265,150	283,387	320,213	354,977	322,621
Djibouti	781	811	837	882	936	996	1,080	1,191	1,382	1,426
Dominica	333	340	333	343	367	364	390	421	458	489
Dominican Republic	24,306	25,602	27,249	21,518	22,506	35,948	37,998	44,067	48,174	48,281
Ecuador	17,531	23,127	27,054	30,965	35,195	40,279	45,691	49,849	61,139	60,095
Egypt	104,752	102,273	90,261	85,164	82,855	94,127	112,902	137,055	170,797	198,316
El Salvador	11,785	12,283	12,664	13,244	13,725	14,698	16,000	17,012	17,987	17,602
Equatorial Guinea	1,159	1,674	2,070	3,733	5,935	8,191	10,096	13,091	19,828	15,072
Eritrea	547	582	564	673	858	850	937	1,020	923	1,297
Estonia	5,707	6,265	7,393	9,894	12,161	14,129	17,049	22,478	24,434	19,694
Eswatini	1,689	1,499	1,394	2,133	2,693	3,084	3,197	3,364	3,202	3,491
Ethiopia	8,238	8,230	7,851	8,623	10,141	12,407	15,283	19,781	27,062	32,629
Fiji	1,824	1,798	1,996	2,509	2,954	3,257	3,361	3,688	3,816	3,106
Finland	126,023	129,521	140,262	171,570	197,369	204,973	217,056	256,390	285,667	253,206
France	1,361,560	1,370,386	1,491,373	1,834,637	2,108,835	2,193,358	2,317,985	2,656,130	2,926,483	2,697,144
Gabon	5,397	5,023	5,332	6,510	7,767	9,468	10,164	12,457	15,570	12,188
Gambia	1,010	1,002	887	843	962	1,028	1,054	1,280	1,562	1,450
Georgia	3,144	3,311	3,493	4,103	5,269	6,590	7,979	10,458	13,158	11,069
Germany	1,967,850	1,966,395	2,100,865	2,534,081	2,851,023	2,894,992	3,046,470	3,484,467	3,807,781	3,474,768
Ghana	12,349	13,113	15,229	18,790	21,754	26,415	30,963	36,544	41,323	37,127
Greece	127,438	132,051	150,148	196,881	234,873	242,450	269,088	314,264	351,083	326,474
Grenada	520	520	540	591	599	695	699	759	826	771
Guatemala	18,124	19,735	21,924	23,092	24,977	28,179	31,308	35,028	40,242	37,997
Guinea	4,884	4,638	4,824	5,828	6,542	5,795	5,294	8,382	9,535	10,312
Guinea-Bissau	392	413	466	553	582	640	635	753	953	889
Guyana	1,497	1,504	1,555	1,592	1,657	1,712	1,899	2,225	2,491	2,596
Haiti	6,810	6,285	6,064	4,866	6,037	7,186	7,507	9,522	10,488	11,598
Honduras	7,104	7,652	7,857	8,229	8,866	9,755	10,917	12,361	13,884	14,586
Hong Kong	171,643	169,381	166,336	161,370	169,085	181,556	193,515	211,583	219,279	214,048
Hungary	47,276	53,800	67,636	85,190	104,015	113,098	115,604	140,123	158,228	130,807
Iceland	9,140	8,323	9,416	11,565	13,964	17,146	17,672	21,960	18,248	13,213
India	468,396	485,440	514,938	607,701	709,152	820,385	940,260	1,216,736	1,198,895	1,341,889
Indonesia	179,482	174,507	212,807	255,346	279,344	310,920	396,518	470,092	558,291	578,577
Iran	447,805	403,943	161,932	193,340	230,618	276,383	326,450	430,465	498,712	509,095
Iraq	25,984	21,113	21,063	15,800	36,642	50,065	65,144	88,833	131,614	111,660
Ireland	100,253	109,347	128,505	164,630	194,136	211,850	232,032	269,937	275,229	236,032
Israel	135,841	134,379	124,603	130,806	139,293	146,592	157,908	183,372	219,700	211,898
Italy	1,150,169	1,172,050	1,280,840	1,582,534	1,811,987	1,866,013	1,958,667	2,222,788	2,417,245	2,207,085
Jamaica	9,300	9,433	9,971	9,675	10,439	11,524	12,256	13,215	14,099	12,421
Japan	5,042,382	4,438,791	4,245,946	4,573,415	4,941,505	4,875,649	4,648,058	4,624,668	5,160,198	5,336,766
Jordan	9,637	10,238	11,015	11,681	13,002	14,507	17,447	19,835	25,640	27,462
Kazakhstan	18,292	22,153	24,637	30,834	43,152	57,125	81,003	104,850	133,442	115,309
Kenya	18,206	18,697	19,030	21,391	22,790	26,307	29,668	36,708	41,058	42,347
Kiribati	75	65	75	97	104	114	112	138	150	142
South Korea	597,802	567,655	649,747	728,497	822,583	971,540	1,094,545	1,220,756	1,093,487	982,854
Kosovo	2,217	2,509	2,730	3,390	3,710	3,828	4,019	4,868	5,202	5,030
Kuwait	37,714	34,906	38,129	47,869	59,439	80,799	101,548	114,608	147,391	105,992
Kyrgyzstan	1,368	1,525	1,606	1,920	2,214	2,459	2,837	3,807	5,139	4,690
Laos	1,720	1,757	1,844	2,260	2,651	3,079	3,934	4,757	5,946	6,431
Latvia	7,765	8,192	9,256	11,249	13,831	16,332	20,453	29,463	34,296	25,758
Lebanon	17,018	17,361	18,837	19,486	21,160	21,497	22,023	24,827	29,119	35,400
Lesotho	922	774	856	1,256	1,598	1,730	1,720	1,759	1,652	1,937
Liberia	863	904	943	713	897	944	1,109	1,344	1,676	1,765
Libya	39,498	35,206	21,128	27,026	34,054	48,852	60,094	68,211	86,804	60,767
Liechtenstein	2,719	2,725	2,927	3,335	3,759	3,989	4,366	5,038	5,551	4,891
Lithuania	11,541	12,260	14,283	18,801	22,710	26,118	30,138	39,765	48,004	37,591
Luxembourg	21,240	21,388	23,633	29,660	35,049	37,693	42,912	51,593	58,838	54,408
Macau		6,860	7,372	8,247	10,643	12,160	14,874	18,440	21,027	21,589
Madagascar	4,629	5,438	5,352	6,372	5,065	5,859	6,396	8,525	10,725	9,617
Malawi	4,257	4,178	4,922	4,521	4,895	5,148	5,630	6,240	7,492	8,723
Malaysia	102,149	101,054	109,833	120,025	135,869	150,345	170,410	202,733	241,947	211,847
Maldives	801	767	828	1,052	1,227	1,163	1,575	1,868	2,272	2,345
Mali	3,482	4,055	4,631	5,522	6,408	7,376	8,086	9,669	11,474	11,909
Malta	4,042	4,072	4,462	5,425	6,109	6,392	6,783	7,972	9,171	8,760
Marshall Islands	115	123	132	131	133	138	143	150	147	151
Mauritania	1,780	1,746	1,777	2,051	2,362	2,936	4,009	4,328	5,138	4,725
Mauritius	4,935	4,882	5,123	6,155	6,962	6,867	7,123	8,260	10,125	9,252
Mexico	742,061	796,055	810,666	765,550	819,459	917,572	1,020,265	1,102,356	1,161,553	943,437
Federated States of Micronesia	233	240	240	243	236	247	250	253	261	277
Moldova	1,315	1,481	1,662	1,981	2,598	2,988	3,408	4,401	6,055	5,438
Mongolia	1,137	1,268	1,397	1,595	1,992	2,523	3,414	4,235	5,623	4,584
Montenegro	964	1,148	1,267	1,679	2,070	2,257	2,720	3,683	4,559	4,155
Morocco	42,053	42,704	45,711	56,345	64,528	67,468	74,284	85,539	100,112	100,535
Mozambique	5,931	5,650	5,951	6,584	7,937	8,868	9,510	10,811	12,920	12,264
Myanmar	7,688	7,087	6,878	8,826	10,688	12,051	13,502	17,745	25,313	30,675
Namibia	3,941	3,577	3,396	4,974	6,673	7,324	7,711	8,730	8,496	8,915
Nauru					32	31	29	25	36	47
Nepal	6,537	6,719	6,816	7,218	8,297	9,331	10,316	11,777	14,310	14,663
Netherlands	417,834	432,539	475,194	582,290	660,925	688,514	737,633	853,600	957,797	878,000
New Zealand	54,127	53,128	62,061	82,408	101,599	113,265	109,742	134,850	135,614	122,003
Nicaragua	5,109	5,335	5,224	5,322	5,793	6,321	6,764	7,423	8,497	8,297
Niger	2,235	2,442	2,772	3,382	3,746	4,372	4,743	5,716	7,279	7,324
Nigeria	95,510	102,980	132,347	144,955	183,553	238,895	313,737	375,055	472,283	425,922
North Macedonia	3,774	3,709	3,991	4,946	5,684	6,257	6,860	8,337	9,912	9,400
Norway	170,619	173,592	195,361	229,193	265,662	311,418	349,772	407,817	472,061	395,663
Oman	22,259	22,206	23,066	24,734	28,379	35,507	42,578	48,300	69,805	55,454
Pakistan	99,421	96,784	98,169	112,507	132,206	145,209	161,871	184,141	202,204	187,074
Palau	150	159	163	155	166	186	191	196	199	184
Panama	11,966	12,253	12,801	13,603	15,100	16,624	18,660	21,717	25,721	27,791
Papua New Guinea	5,169	4,531	4,387	5,488	6,279	7,339	8,355	9,545	11,671	11,619
Paraguay	8,856	8,496	7,196	7,691	9,624	10,738	13,430	17,856	24,615	22,355
Peru	50,352	51,053	53,921	58,578	66,214	74,054	87,667	102,335	120,247	122,433
Philippines	83,667	78,921	84,307	87,039	95,002	107,420	127,653	155,980	181,007	176,132
Poland	172,151	191,403	199,694	218,561	256,454	307,158	345,898	429,715	535,612	440,954
Portugal	118,658	121,605	134,700	165,185	189,296	197,363	208,767	240,524	263,388	244,402
Puerto Rico	61,702	69,669	72,546	75,834	80,322	83,915	87,276	89,524	93,639	96,386
Qatar	18,085	17,498	19,334	23,716	30,651	44,636	58,629	75,987	112,621	88,196
Romania	37,447	40,396	46,035	57,790	75,059	98,547	122,114	174,831	215,567	174,572
Russia	278,264	328,475	370,062	461,518	633,294	817,717	1,060,901	1,393,416	1,779,109	1,307,927
Rwanda	2,049	1,967	1,963	2,139	2,388	2,945	3,271	4,016	5,121	5,605
Samoa	271	273	289	342	418	486	516	568	684	618
San Marino	1,008	1,060	1,148	1,462	1,714	1,788	1,910	2,189	2,403	2,062
São Tomé and Príncipe	77	72	80	96	104	125	133	145	188	201
Saudi Arabia	189,515	184,138	189,606	215,808	258,742	328,205	376,398	415,687	519,797	429,098
Senegal	6,016	6,508	7,001	8,767	10,072	11,015	11,699	13,996	16,852	16,128
Serbia	10,431	13,650	17,997	23,627	26,718	28,143	33,421	45,121	54,117	46,949
Seychelles	615	622	696	706	839	919	1,016	1,034	967	847
Sierra Leone	1,498	1,726	1,990	2,218	2,339	2,738	3,144	3,451	3,926	3,795
Singapore	96,077	89,794	92,538	97,646	115,034	127,808	148,627	180,942	193,617	194,150
Slovakia	20,711	21,384	24,849	33,864	43,023	48,912	57,480	77,260	97,122	89,246
Slovenia	20,262	20,693	23,263	29,399	34,190	36,002	39,293	47,886	55,503	49,921
Solomon Islands	497	485	410	418	468	553	617	695	776	806
Somalia										
South Africa	151,855	135,527	129,385	197,017	256,188	288,749	304,055	332,650	316,491	331,184
South Sudan										
Spain	598,367	627,803	708,437	907,736	1,069,344	1,155,306	1,261,914	1,476,920	1,635,936	1,494,963
Sri Lanka	20,007	19,236	20,238	22,352	24,423	28,880	33,447	38,270	48,177	49,750
Saint Kitts and Nevis	437	479	499	483	527	574	671	717	778	774
Saint Lucia	932	892	899	987	1,066	1,135	1,288	1,355	1,432	1,400
Saint Vincent and the Grenadines	428	462	488	509	550	580	644	714	733	714
Sudan	13,134	15,716	18,137	21,355	26,646	35,183	45,264	59,440	64,833	54,812
Suriname	1,355	1,167	1,474	1,729	2,000	2,393	2,812	3,144	3,783	4,150
Sweden	262,902	242,497	267,371	334,072	384,546	391,689	422,526	490,050	514,614	434,311
Switzerland	282,375	290,270	314,076	366,684	408,713	424,383	448,477	499,213	574,682	563,497
Syria	19,861	20,979	22,758	21,702	25,204	28,881	33,824	40,488	52,631	53,939
Taiwan	330,680	299,276	307,439	317,381	346,924	374,060	386,450	406,907	415,901	390,829
Tajikistan	991	1,057	1,212	1,555	2,073	2,311	2,811	3,712	5,135	4,977
Tanzania	12,369	12,610	13,123	14,159	15,576	17,174	18,878	21,810	27,779	29,301
Thailand	126,392	120,296	134,301	152,281	172,896	189,318	221,758	262,943	291,383	281,711
Timor-Leste	367	477	470	490	441	462	454	543	648	727
Togo	2,014	2,000	2,301	2,854	3,048	3,080	3,173	3,760	4,578	4,717
Tonga	203	181	183	202	231	262	292	299	344	312
Trinidad and Tobago	8,295	8,952	9,201	11,522	13,531	16,257	18,693	22,032	28,341	19,601
Tunisia	22,524	23,146	24,274	28,797	32,710	33,851	36,059	40,819	47,039	45,593
Turkey	273,570	203,001	238,674	317,342	408,309	506,794	554,902	686,909	787,897	656,134
Turkmenistan	4,680	6,461	8,107	10,645	13,228	16,003	19,935	24,192	20,049	18,836
Tuvalu	15	14	17	20	23	23	24	29	32	28
Uganda	7,756	7,835	8,425	8,725	10,750	12,460	14,079	17,512	22,419	24,107
Ukraine	32,375	39,309	43,956	52,010	67,221	89,282	111,885	148,734	188,240	121,552
United Arab Emirates	102,987	103,312	109,816	124,346	147,812	180,616	222,117	257,883	315,464	253,547
United Kingdom	1,668,107	1,649,872	1,785,889	2,054,763	2,421,249	2,544,005	2,712,673	3,095,209	2,968,167	2,433,982
United States	10,250,950	10,581,925	10,929,100	11,456,450	12,217,175	13,039,200	13,815,600	14,474,250	14,769,850	14,478,050
Uruguay	24,892	22,802	14,863	13,159	14,959	18,986	21,416	25,603	33,151	34,565
Uzbekistan	19,096	16,193	13,444	14,100	16,708	19,922	23,703	31,054	39,822	46,582
Vanuatu	300	285	290	349	403	432	481	572	644	652
Venezuela	117,596	123,119	95,258	83,684	112,254	143,375	178,521	234,943	303,293	262,260
Vietnam	39,585	41,297	44,563	50,233	62,877	73,197	84,301	98,426	124,756	129,022
Palestine	4,314	4,004	3,556	3,968	4,603	5,126	5,348	5,816	7,310	8,086
Yemen										
Zambia	3,601	4,094	4,194	4,902	6,221	8,329	12,762	14,060	17,914	15,332
Zimbabwe	16,755	16,613	15,861	14,145	13,985	13,365	12,029	11,502	9,910	14,282

=== 2010s ===
IMF estimates (2010s)
Country / territory	2010	2011	2012	2013	2014	2015	2016	2017	2018	2019
Afghanistan	15,325	17,890	20,293	20,170	20,616	20,057	18,020	18,883	18,336	18,876
Albania	11,937	12,899	12,324	12,784	13,246	11,508	12,087	13,280	15,382	15,541
Algeria	177,785	218,332	227,144	229,701	238,943	187,494	180,764	190,004	194,507	193,361
Andorra	3,446	3,625	3,189	3,193	3,267	2,789	2,895	2,993	3,217	3,155
Angola	95,547	125,552	143,573	153,761	164,448	131,661	116,473	141,911	115,456	95,210
Antigua and Barbuda	1,298	1,287	1,365	1,325	1,379	1,437	1,490	1,535	1,662	1,726
Argentina	424,729	527,644	579,666	611,471	563,614	642,464	556,774	643,861	524,431	446,762
Armenia	9,260	10,142	10,946	11,121	11,610	10,553	10,546	11,527	12,458	13,619
Aruba	2,454	2,638	2,615	2,728	2,791	2,963	2,984	3,092	3,276	3,348
Australia	1,258,448	1,520,464	1,575,907	1,526,585	1,463,096	1,238,841	1,267,648	1,386,401	1,422,650	1,391,999
Austria	390,146	428,879	407,008	426,587	438,669	379,584	393,579	414,780	452,787	443,033
Azerbaijan	52,909	65,952	69,684	74,164	75,235	52,997	37,830	41,375	47,113	48,174
Bahamas	10,096	10,070	10,721	10,511	11,221	11,867	11,891	12,457	12,839	13,320
Bahrain	26,806	29,915	31,963	33,823	34,773	32,523	33,885	37,205	39,568	40,447
Bangladesh	138,094	154,097	159,749	179,676	207,102	233,687	265,236	293,755	321,379	351,238
Barbados	5,429	5,563	5,487	5,660	5,685	5,700	5,679	5,847	6,001	6,167
Belarus	57,220	61,368	65,669	75,496	78,736	56,329	47,703	54,723	60,011	64,414
Belgium	481,949	527,106	498,731	524,106	538,127	461,091	474,141	500,733	542,885	536,787
Belize	1,749	1,832	1,917	2,035	2,138	2,193	2,240	2,266	2,286	2,381
Benin	9,543	10,691	11,148	12,518	13,288	11,389	11,818	12,766	14,346	14,697
Bhutan	1,529	1,880	1,966	1,995	1,962	2,159	2,252	2,462	2,651	2,618
Bolivia	22,698	27,915	31,444	35,965	39,307	40,034	41,606	46,262	48,767	49,414
Bosnia and Herzegovina	17,207	18,665	17,237	18,184	18,588	16,413	17,124	18,363	20,504	20,485
Botswana	12,637	15,111	13,907	14,272	15,470	13,531	15,083	16,105	17,032	16,696
Brazil	2,208,704	2,614,027	2,464,053	2,471,718	2,456,055	1,800,046	1,796,622	2,063,519	1,916,934	1,873,286
Brunei	13,711	18,524	19,051	18,094	17,093	12,933	11,403	12,130	13,564	13,472
Bulgaria	50,802	57,727	54,323	55,855	57,172	50,818	53,948	59,288	66,163	68,513
Burkina Faso	10,118	12,078	12,569	13,444	13,947	11,833	12,829	14,094	15,916	16,092
Burundi	2,032	2,236	2,333	2,456	2,706	3,104	2,960	3,172	3,037	3,007
Cape Verde	1,825	2,047	1,913	2,029	2,042	1,750	1,850	1,997	2,205	2,251
Cambodia	13,720	16,055	17,757	19,679	22,176	24,080	26,502	29,121	32,839	35,979
Cameroon	27,530	30,626	30,174	33,729	36,396	32,213	33,805	36,086	39,992	39,673
Canada	1,617,345	1,793,327	1,828,362	1,846,595	1,805,751	1,556,508	1,527,996	1,649,266	1,725,300	1,743,725
Central African Republic	3,144	3,764	3,410	2,418	2,958	2,636	2,768	3,012	3,227	3,333
Chad	14,070	16,682	17,878	17,861	18,186	14,566	13,075	13,258	15,169	14,819
Chile	217,105	251,225	267,165	277,218	259,394	242,515	249,306	276,357	295,428	278,063
China	6,193,268	7,674,918	8,673,435	9,747,148	10,675,635	11,279,165	11,459,780	12,550,474	14,144,681	14,581,031
Colombia	286,499	334,966	370,691	382,094	381,241	293,493	282,720	311,890	334,124	323,055
Comoros	909	1,023	1,016	1,116	1,150	966	1,013	1,077	1,179	1,188
Democratic Republic of the Congo	22,340	26,406	30,074	34,908	38,355	40,154	38,086	37,499	46,660	46,844
Republic of the Congo	13,159	15,653	17,704	17,959	17,924	12,436	10,928	11,830	14,781	13,820
Costa Rica	37,656	42,762	47,231	50,949	52,017	56,442	58,847	60,517	62,570	64,748
Ivory Coast	34,431	35,529	37,030	43,228	48,882	45,815	48,408	52,512	58,522	60,383
Croatia	59,028	62,875	57,586	59,846	59,623	51,005	52,636	56,164	61,694	61,474
Cyprus	25,821	27,637	25,063	23,960	23,232	19,911	21,041	22,938	25,766	26,200
Czech Republic	211,169	231,429	210,363	213,024	210,911	189,108	198,161	221,564	251,992	256,794
Denmark	322,346	344,316	326,793	344,631	352,833	301,759	312,182	331,611	355,293	345,402
Djibouti	1,544	1,740	1,901	2,044	2,221	2,424	2,605	2,763	2,913	3,089
Dominica	494	501	486	498	520	541	576	522	555	612
Dominican Republic	53,862	58,006	60,627	62,631	67,098	71,056	75,625	79,153	85,068	89,237
Ecuador	68,151	78,987	87,735	96,570	102,718	97,210	97,671	104,467	107,479	107,596
Egypt	230,024	247,726	294,482	303,194	321,634	350,119	351,443	246,826	263,156	317,894
El Salvador	18,448	20,284	21,386	21,991	22,593	23,438	24,191	24,979	26,021	26,881
Equatorial Guinea	16,328	21,354	22,403	21,949	21,771	13,187	11,238	12,197	13,309	11,365
Eritrea	1,590	2,065	2,255	1,958	2,604	2,016	2,213	1,904	2,006	1,982
Estonia	19,569	23,300	23,252	25,451	27,063	23,314	24,554	27,460	31,237	31,877
Eswatini	4,309	4,685	4,744	4,466	4,288	3,906	3,721	4,467	4,644	4,617
Ethiopia	30,063	31,957	43,321	47,651	55,618	64,591	74,260	81,788	84,298	95,945
Fiji	3,402	4,094	4,303	4,539	4,857	4,682	4,930	5,353	5,581	5,345
Finland	249,633	275,079	257,606	270,272	273,549	233,234	238,712	253,757	273,993	267,044
France	2,648,391	2,869,903	2,684,706	2,816,119	2,861,973	2,442,731	2,469,726	2,587,955	2,782,838	2,723,094
Gabon	14,384	18,207	17,181	17,596	18,209	14,385	14,020	14,924	16,830	16,875
Gambia	1,543	1,410	1,415	1,376	1,229	1,355	1,470	1,498	1,662	1,806
Georgia	12,425	15,475	16,894	17,516	17,966	15,223	15,445	16,472	17,905	17,645
Germany	3,469,925	3,823,320	3,600,561	3,811,064	3,971,208	3,433,391	3,546,502	3,778,421	4,076,826	3,983,116
Ghana	45,447	53,625	55,800	62,846	54,678	49,437	56,144	60,385	67,259	68,353
Greece	296,660	283,178	238,992	236,560	233,972	194,587	193,044	200,310	213,396	207,329
Grenada	771	779	800	843	911	997	1,062	1,126	1,167	1,213
Guatemala	41,493	47,419	49,902	52,989	57,835	62,180	66,034	71,624	73,331	77,156
Guinea	9,394	10,108	11,919	13,069	13,987	13,380	13,411	16,520	17,927	20,505
Guinea-Bissau	941	1,157	1,050	1,110	1,136	1,153	1,245	1,469	1,555	1,487
Guyana	2,889	3,328	4,063	4,168	4,128	4,280	4,483	4,748	4,788	5,174
Haiti	11,852	13,009	13,709	14,904	15,137	14,831	13,996	15,036	16,454	14,787
Honduras	15,837	17,710	18,523	18,494	19,753	20,978	21,712	23,138	24,067	24,883
Hong Kong	228,639	248,514	262,629	275,697	291,460	309,386	320,860	341,271	361,731	363,075
Hungary	131,899	141,713	128,470	135,646	141,129	125,244	128,984	143,335	161,185	164,927
Iceland	13,923	15,394	14,944	16,244	18,052	17,700	21,084	25,060	26,678	24,986
India	1,675,615	1,823,052	1,823,229	1,847,765	2,024,371	2,083,293	2,267,121	2,613,101	2,657,293	2,780,889
Indonesia	755,094	892,969	917,870	912,524	890,815	860,854	931,877	1,015,619	1,042,272	1,119,100
Iran	598,566	722,130	487,110	494,544	532,056	471,415	477,575	507,800	343,713	252,142
Iraq	138,517	185,750	218,032	234,638	234,651	177,634	168,429	190,048	230,189	236,682
Ireland	221,776	240,773	226,933	242,648	266,296	301,957	305,205	348,081	395,729	407,076
Israel	238,018	266,342	261,811	296,583	312,872	301,316	319,474	355,577	373,833	397,603
Italy	2,146,687	2,306,569	2,099,259	2,153,257	2,173,816	1,845,615	1,886,590	1,970,025	2,100,387	2,019,829
Jamaica	13,535	14,787	15,149	14,582	14,225	14,927	14,931	15,726	16,767	17,002
Japan	5,811,577	6,279,423	6,333,803	5,272,297	4,985,764	4,534,438	5,110,357	5,038,232	5,154,293	5,245,755
Jordan	30,203	32,640	34,903	37,927	40,592	42,454	43,750	45,600	47,503	48,709
Kazakhstan	148,047	192,626	207,999	236,635	221,416	184,388	137,278	166,806	179,340	181,667
Kenya	45,406	46,555	56,407	61,703	68,395	70,370	74,816	81,965	92,211	100,328
Kiribati	166	196	207	202	201	192	207	223	234	234
South Korea	1,192,722	1,307,239	1,335,344	1,434,670	1,556,252	1,539,212	1,578,816	1,710,197	1,824,251	1,751,046
Kosovo	5,348	6,340	6,167	6,735	7,076	6,296	6,681	7,178	7,882	7,900
Kuwait	115,401	154,020	174,066	174,179	162,695	114,606	109,399	120,688	138,655	140,855
Kyrgyzstan	4,794	6,198	6,604	7,335	7,467	6,678	6,813	7,703	8,271	9,372
Laos	7,506	8,964	10,194	11,972	13,266	14,418	15,904	17,055	18,131	18,770
Latvia	23,509	26,832	27,136	29,157	30,285	26,347	27,110	29,381	33,263	33,103
Lebanon	38,444	39,927	44,015	46,868	48,068	49,893	50,618	52,880	55,290	50,983
Lesotho	2,356	2,571	2,465	2,345	2,477	2,202	2,206	2,424	2,472	2,323
Liberia	1,966	2,340	2,675	3,044	3,090	3,092	3,256	3,321	3,264	3,080
Libya	75,381	48,170	92,542	75,355	57,384	48,718	49,913	67,153	76,682	69,237
Liechtenstein	5,536	6,238	5,909	6,273	6,533	6,154	6,118	6,375	6,693	6,437
Lithuania	36,693	43,201	42,736	46,321	48,388	41,548	42,952	47,745	54,295	55,132
Luxembourg	56,260	61,685	59,814	65,204	68,823	60,078	62,200	65,689	71,118	69,880
Macau	28,244	36,847	43,193	51,559	54,931	44,941	44,965	50,297	55,076	55,025
Madagascar	9,983	11,552	11,579	12,424	12,523	11,323	11,849	13,176	13,760	14,105
Malawi	9,796	11,241	8,421	7,648	8,526	9,014	7,733	8,943	9,882	11,031
Malaysia	258,641	302,184	318,910	327,869	342,868	301,355	301,256	319,109	358,783	365,178
Maldives	2,588	2,629	2,885	3,286	3,690	4,118	4,398	4,809	5,398	5,716
Mali	12,438	15,461	14,816	15,753	17,100	15,592	16,765	18,334	20,418	20,521
Malta	9,104	9,788	9,616	10,797	11,891	11,342	12,022	14,156	16,161	16,340
Marshall Islands	161	172	181	186	186	184	202	214	220	233
Mauritania	5,637	6,782	6,721	7,331	6,615	6,182	6,414	6,826	7,472	7,894
Mauritius	10,138	11,673	11,826	12,293	13,074	12,007	12,594	13,714	14,736	14,436
Mexico	1,105,424	1,229,014	1,255,110	1,327,436	1,364,508	1,213,294	1,112,233	1,190,721	1,256,300	1,304,106
Federated States of Micronesia	292	308	324	314	316	312	327	361	394	395
Moldova	6,977	8,417	8,708	9,496	9,402	7,778	7,981	9,515	11,252	11,737
Mongolia	7,185	10,410	12,278	12,582	12,227	11,620	11,154	11,481	13,207	14,206
Montenegro	4,140	4,506	4,074	4,422	4,581	4,011	4,356	4,802	5,436	5,484
Morocco	100,881	109,705	106,345	115,608	119,131	110,414	111,573	118,541	127,341	128,920
Mozambique	11,412	14,619	16,688	17,198	17,978	16,209	12,069	13,265	15,017	15,513
Myanmar	37,851	53,250	58,374	62,656	65,404	59,330	62,839	66,083	67,491	75,282
Namibia	11,281	12,423	13,016	12,168	12,434	11,450	10,719	12,883	13,676	12,539
Nauru	50	69	101	89	97	76	100	109	131	125
Nepal	18,253	21,685	21,703	22,162	22,722	24,361	24,524	28,972	33,112	34,186
Netherlands	853,161	912,980	846,225	883,964	901,789	775,822	796,944	847,934	930,155	929,006
New Zealand	145,742	167,151	175,315	187,226	200,094	176,080	185,958	203,549	209,415	210,776
Nicaragua	8,759	9,774	10,532	10,983	11,880	12,757	13,286	13,786	13,025	12,713
Niger	7,838	8,754	9,412	10,206	10,830	9,684	10,350	11,181	12,814	12,917
Nigeria	526,809	591,367	657,854	734,890	811,134	696,088	570,351	529,144	593,897	668,219
North Macedonia	9,415	10,499	9,751	10,824	11,378	10,067	10,686	11,336	12,694	12,609
Norway	440,133	512,869	525,084	540,133	515,830	400,669	383,284	415,673	454,589	424,245
Oman	64,994	77,497	87,409	89,936	92,699	78,711	75,129	80,857	91,506	88,061
Pakistan	196,712	230,577	250,094	258,674	271,422	299,930	313,623	339,229	356,163	321,071
Palau	184	195	215	226	245	283	303	290	288	282
Panama	30,231	35,688	41,595	46,949	51,427	55,768	59,761	64,328	67,316	69,779
Papua New Guinea	14,251	17,985	21,295	21,261	23,211	21,723	20,759	22,743	24,110	24,751
Paraguay	27,129	33,737	33,296	38,651	40,378	36,211	36,090	38,997	40,225	37,925
Peru	149,265	170,780	193,275	201,575	203,679	193,352	198,825	220,098	229,553	236,265
Philippines	208,369	234,217	261,920	283,903	297,484	306,446	318,627	328,481	346,842	376,823
Poland	478,111	527,848	498,149	518,180	542,266	479,729	472,883	528,497	594,641	602,592
Portugal	238,639	245,383	216,674	226,681	230,138	199,059	206,249	220,785	242,203	240,142
Puerto Rico	98,381	100,352	101,565	102,450	102,446	103,376	104,337	103,446	100,958	105,126
Qatar	119,707	167,775	186,834	198,728	206,225	161,740	151,732	161,099	183,335	176,371
Romania	170,329	192,846	179,228	189,839	199,989	177,878	185,337	210,530	241,973	250,056
Russia	1,633,111	2,046,621	2,191,486	2,288,428	2,048,837	1,356,703	1,280,648	1,575,140	1,653,005	1,695,724
Rwanda	6,052	6,803	7,557	7,714	8,130	8,451	8,597	9,165	9,651	10,519
Samoa	680	744	773	798	797	824	844	885	878	913
San Marino	1,883	1,813	1,606	1,678	1,674	1,420	1,468	1,528	1,656	1,616
São Tomé and Príncipe	191	228	231	269	295	262	294	325	387	416
Saudi Arabia	528,207	680,661	751,921	769,755	787,153	693,415	689,279	741,266	886,564	888,888
Senegal	16,134	17,811	17,672	18,919	19,802	17,777	19,035	20,989	23,127	23,405
Serbia	43,067	51,274	45,111	50,456	49,114	41,297	42,225	45,973	52,788	53,865
Seychelles	970	1,018	1,059	1,328	1,388	1,432	1,568	1,675	1,784	1,869
Sierra Leone	4,174	4,799	5,746	6,736	6,521	6,750	6,038	5,823	6,390	6,519
Singapore	239,808	279,357	295,093	307,576	314,864	307,999	320,759	344,795	377,976	376,827
Slovakia	91,187	99,688	94,784	99,136	101,739	89,188	90,322	95,944	106,660	105,855
Slovenia	47,832	51,190	46,196	47,868	49,527	42,714	44,279	48,136	53,713	53,916
Solomon Islands	898	1,064	1,185	1,286	1,336	1,308	1,379	1,470	1,615	1,619
Somalia		5,022	5,183	5,869	6,443	6,841	7,391	8,252	7,873	8,724
South Africa	417,315	458,708	434,400	400,877	381,195	346,663	323,493	381,317	405,093	389,245
South Sudan		17,340	11,267	14,947	14,608	15,082	2,825	2,736	2,559	4,044
Spain	1,429,155	1,487,307	1,331,838	1,362,207	1,380,600	1,206,287	1,242,673	1,321,288	1,432,292	1,403,651
Sri Lanka	58,643	67,725	70,392	76,934	82,483	85,091	88,000	94,376	94,484	89,015
Saint Kitts and Nevis	779	836	849	897	974	957	1,007	1,057	1,061	1,088
Saint Lucia	1,479	1,565	1,597	1,661	1,750	1,808	1,868	2,000	2,061	2,090
Saint Vincent and the Grenadines	720	714	730	765	771	787	814	844	884	910
Sudan	65,716	66,448	48,948	52,892	60,726	64,534	64,888	48,906	33,590	31,484
Suriname	4,677	4,735	5,332	5,510	5,612	5,126	3,317	3,592	3,996	4,016
Sweden	492,751	570,539	549,740	584,125	577,728	501,602	513,058	535,172	549,649	530,894
Switzerland	609,514	727,011	698,041	719,068	741,403	706,036	698,477	706,860	741,027	736,738
Syria	60,043									
Taiwan	444,281	483,974	495,610	512,943	535,328	534,515	543,081	591,687	610,690	613,512
Tajikistan	5,642	6,523	7,592	8,506	9,242	7,857	6,994	7,535	7,762	8,301
Tanzania	31,860	34,369	39,650	45,677	49,982	47,424	49,774	54,000	54,775	58,797
Thailand	341,105	370,819	397,558	420,334	407,339	401,296	413,366	456,357	506,754	543,977
Timor-Leste	882	1,042	1,160	1,396	1,448	1,590	1,640	1,585	1,556	2,033
Togo	4,750	5,421	5,417	6,022	6,395	5,756	6,069	6,385	7,032	6,993
Tonga	367	415	427	452	441	438	421	460	485	505
Trinidad and Tobago	22,620	25,828	27,259	28,681	29,583	26,942	23,724	23,925	23,940	23,456
Tunisia	46,210	48,122	47,311	48,681	50,273	45,779	44,360	42,167	42,687	41,905
Turkey	783,025	843,326	882,437	962,457	943,337	868,204	870,339	863,906	807,318	775,223
Turkmenistan	21,321	27,776	35,164	39,198	43,524	35,800	36,180	37,926	40,762	44,974
Tuvalu	32	40	39	39	39	37	41	46	49	55
Uganda	24,683	27,501	30,939	32,331	34,754	30,122	30,233	31,584	34,151	37,829
Ukraine	141,208	169,229	182,592	190,499	133,434	90,981	93,355	112,091	130,891	153,883
United Arab Emirates	307,736	368,881	392,793	409,633	424,936	381,973	381,717	403,365	440,560	433,926
United Kingdom	2,498,365	2,677,518	2,722,560	2,804,222	3,090,182	2,947,612	2,717,907	2,708,052	2,909,489	2,890,766
United States	15,048,975	15,599,725	16,253,950	16,880,675	17,608,125	18,295,000	18,804,900	19,612,100	20,656,525	21,539,975
Uruguay	43,967	52,354	55,938	62,857	62,546	58,218	57,580	65,068	65,370	62,229
Uzbekistan	55,551	67,443	75,322	82,688	91,307	96,960	97,325	69,703	61,318	70,171
Vanuatu	721	816	814	859	881	871	902	999	1,000	1,054
Venezuela	303,863	304,551	338,732	225,506	128,764	84,287	78,521	59,976	47,614	22,371
Vietnam	143,287	171,367	195,167	212,737	232,891	236,839	252,139	277,076	304,474	331,811
Palestine	9,682	11,186	12,208	13,516	13,990	13,972	15,405	16,128	16,277	17,134
Yemen					14,221	10,265	9,944	10,443	11,494	12,849
Zambia	20,264	23,455	25,502	28,042	27,145	21,245	20,965	25,874	26,311	23,309
Zimbabwe	17,265	20,134	24,173	26,756	28,248	28,123	29,257	31,018	53,914	39,776

=== 2020s ===
The following list contains the various countries' projected GDP (nominal) from 2020 to 2029. The projections for future years presume that government policies do not change, and assume specific values for oil prices, bond rates, and exchange rates.

IMF estimates (2020s)
Country / territory	2020	2021	2022	2023	2024	2025	2026	2027	2028	2029
Afghanistan	20,136	14,278	14,501	17,248	17,817	19,711				
Albania	15,329	18,019	19,196	23,642	27,078	30,108	32,769	34,692	36,787	38,981
Algeria	164,774	185,850	225,709	248,087	269,140	284,456	331,894	338,923	337,792	336,673
Andorra	2,885	3,325	3,376	3,786	4,042	4,491	4,916	5,138	5,330	5,518
Angola	66,136	83,022	139,171	113,135	119,574	140,683	157,297	170,003	164,223	160,694
Antigua and Barbuda	1,412	1,602	1,857	2,054	2,162	2,273	2,391	2,508	2,621	2,740
Argentina	385,218	486,040	633,520	654,081	637,744	683,589	768,206	762,290	761,045	784,255
Armenia	12,642	13,879	19,514	24,186	26,099	29,308	32,974	34,057	36,087	38,561
Aruba	2,461	2,889	3,327	3,747	4,056	4,420	4,679	4,898	5,092	5,263
Australia	1,366,592	1,660,108	1,731,293	1,748,100	1,799,014	1,840,755	2,110,657	2,217,437	2,301,554	2,391,001
Austria	434,050	480,786	473,594	516,820	534,630	580,101	616,896	642,049	662,753	682,093
Azerbaijan	42,693	54,825	78,807	72,428	74,426	75,938	89,181	91,783	94,203	98,357
Bahamas	10,350	12,063	13,907	15,387	16,043	17,219	18,279	19,141	19,908	20,606
Bahrain	35,838	40,840	46,458	46,192	47,210	48,966	46,018	52,535	55,320	57,594
Bangladesh	373,902	416,265	460,201	451,534	450,461	457,904	506,357	570,026	597,659	600,997
Barbados	5,403	5,949	6,887	7,223	7,598	7,944	8,256	8,698	9,101	9,525
Belarus	61,312	68,207	73,735	71,792	78,847	96,048	108,110	110,042	115,959	123,717
Belgium	529,269	598,920	591,941	650,967	670,781	725,056	772,699	798,323	820,229	844,888
Belize	2,047	2,429	2,847	3,052	3,204	3,322	3,444	3,556	3,650	3,746
Benin	15,674	17,699	17,439	19,679	21,487	24,613	27,410	29,824	32,365	35,196
Bhutan	2,586	2,621	2,866	2,920	3,147	3,510	3,909	4,392	4,878	5,454
Bolivia	42,622	48,227	51,331	52,722	55,281	65,241	53,843			
Bosnia and Herzegovina	20,264	23,688	24,581	27,606	29,738	33,589	37,264	39,869	42,223	44,574
Botswana	14,930	18,750	20,321	19,411	19,395	19,889	22,125	23,701	25,103	27,612
Brazil	1,476,092	1,670,650	1,951,849	2,191,137	2,185,822	2,279,918	2,654,761	2,796,144	2,899,104	3,055,803
Brunei	12,008	14,008	16,684	15,098	15,334	15,002	18,873	18,249	17,761	17,811
Bulgaria	70,595	84,437	90,716	102,237	113,364	131,024	146,507	159,127	170,126	179,173
Burkina Faso	17,837	19,708	18,662	20,116	23,130	27,680	32,408	34,704	36,601	39,130
Burundi	3,089	3,354	3,923	4,292	4,822	6,784	7,606	8,455	8,973	9,528
Cape Verde	1,829	2,053	2,252	2,501	2,714	3,064	3,389	3,645	3,896	4,169
Cambodia	34,497	36,170	39,461	42,404	46,098	50,659	54,180	57,752	61,993	66,862
Cameroon	40,832	45,036	44,443	48,822	53,308	59,159	64,810	69,490	74,295	80,113
Canada	1,655,685	2,022,382	2,200,567	2,196,594	2,270,076	2,321,182	2,490,256	2,625,469	2,748,940	2,871,765
Central African Republic	3,577	3,879	3,670	3,886	4,126	4,636	5,079	5,411	5,760	6,147
Chad	14,812	16,975	18,052	18,638	20,656	21,958	25,237	26,933	28,210	30,116
Chile	254,122	315,593	301,143	335,911	329,203	357,401	402,243	413,443	430,407	447,337
China	15,003,300	18,194,575	18,346,879	18,367,061	18,928,994	19,626,191	21,546,403	22,939,132	24,234,521	25,657,941
Colombia	270,348	318,524	345,632	366,902	420,504	457,096	572,735	634,699	663,262	693,986
Comoros	1,218	1,273	1,224	1,328	1,442	1,608	1,728	1,827	1,922	2,015
Democratic Republic of the Congo	46,682	59,068	70,422	69,844	76,724	92,901	122,281	130,717	139,071	148,427
Republic of the Congo	10,706	13,680	15,537	14,839	15,182	15,426	19,115	18,964	18,983	19,615
Costa Rica	62,792	65,582	70,993	87,524	96,730	102,902	115,254	124,401	131,286	138,456
Ivory Coast	63,119	72,833	71,075	80,792	87,132	99,897	110,446	119,456	129,373	140,964
Croatia	57,914	69,052	71,255	85,649	92,954	105,008	115,915	122,234	128,229	133,948
Cyprus	25,535	30,393	31,243	35,085	37,623	41,202	44,292	46,813	49,441	52,148
Czech Republic	251,110	290,973	301,831	345,059	347,564	391,789	427,953	447,589	466,586	484,352
Denmark	355,631	406,110	400,115	403,693	433,035	470,948	499,354	520,424	540,685	562,473
Djibouti	3,144	3,393	3,563	3,898	4,152	4,489	4,870	5,236	5,580	5,951
Dominica	504	555	607	659	689	744	788	820	861	901
Dominican Republic	78,625	95,067	113,813	120,794	124,613	127,895	145,362	158,759	169,881	181,194
Ecuador	95,865	107,179	116,133	120,793	123,802	130,321	138,199	144,133	150,133	156,658
Egypt	382,525	423,300	475,231	393,828	383,105	364,638	442,886	486,185	515,550	565,491
El Salvador	24,921	29,043	31,870	33,565	34,880	36,708	39,379	41,783	43,923	46,216
Equatorial Guinea	9,908	12,222	13,717	12,544	13,257	12,847	14,280	13,813	13,766	14,081
Eritrea	1,982									
Estonia	31,795	37,226	38,406	41,271	43,156	47,291	51,029	53,853	56,108	58,531
Eswatini	4,136	4,807	4,747	4,621	4,855	5,207	6,054	6,415	6,713	7,016
Ethiopia	107,672	111,266	126,770	163,709	210,000	126,351	127,145	145,748	165,657	188,994
Fiji	4,228	4,159	4,978	5,488	5,999	6,227	6,568	6,890	7,219	7,580
Finland	269,784	294,419	279,982	294,985	298,810	318,230	338,564	349,815	360,384	371,549
France	2,645,806	2,968,405	2,796,987	3,065,011	3,177,843	3,382,595	3,554,155	3,648,999	3,747,402	3,856,026
Gabon	15,364	19,455	20,485	20,059	20,900	21,890	25,993	26,345	26,557	27,283
Gambia	1,809	2,045	2,135	2,331	2,494	2,783	3,018	3,264	3,540	3,802
Georgia	16,013	18,849	24,985	30,778	34,191	38,136	44,109	49,187	53,673	58,647
Germany	3,969,002	4,394,541	4,226,711	4,602,049	4,746,909	5,115,594	5,471,299	5,661,302	5,822,319	5,990,500
Ghana	70,008	79,514	73,919	80,547	83,289	114,708	128,638	131,626	136,486	144,336
Greece	191,210	218,449	218,162	243,016	256,161	280,476	304,627	320,469	331,794	343,763
Grenada	1,043	1,122	1,224	1,336	1,394	1,470	1,554	1,629	1,709	1,791
Guatemala	77,718	86,443	95,610	104,283	113,206	123,316	132,270	143,041	154,182	166,287
Guinea	23,459	25,137	30,060	35,333	38,348	42,272	45,307	49,987	56,233	62,523
Guinea-Bissau	1,523	1,722	1,721	2,005	2,186	2,656	2,944	3,173	3,395	3,641
Guyana	5,471	8,041	14,718	16,919	24,663	26,765	40,341	43,530	45,065	46,858
Haiti	14,508	21,017	19,826	19,603	25,285	32,102	39,389	46,572	52,190	54,396
Honduras	23,350	28,146	31,425	34,356	36,987	39,598	40,969	43,522	46,240	48,938
Hong Kong	344,941	368,954	358,674	380,762	408,328	427,063	455,156	477,058	495,961	519,211
Hungary	158,468	183,283	177,784	213,104	223,004	247,126	265,911	278,347	291,224	305,828
Iceland	22,035	26,235	29,176	31,659	33,174	38,471	42,772	45,528	47,403	49,766
India	2,616,785	3,090,875	3,257,327	3,511,702	3,759,774	3,908,964	4,060,207	4,521,197	4,995,623	5,542,035
Indonesia	1,059,055	1,186,510	1,319,101	1,371,167	1,396,302	1,445,642	1,479,954	1,608,966	1,765,038	1,914,414
Iran	209,510	307,337	403,254	421,547	416,676	371,123	311,950	317,424	326,042	336,940
Iraq	182,576	210,753	288,059	270,799	283,703	264,167	245,234	285,761	307,205	317,531
Ireland	434,487	530,775	551,439	563,278	608,050	680,362	709,972	749,730	783,319	815,598
Israel	409,158	486,089	520,288	508,497	542,254	616,560	746,982	799,798	839,962	880,467
Italy	1,905,956	2,180,657	2,105,723	2,317,551	2,382,717	2,550,111	2,701,737	2,772,406	2,830,231	2,892,771
Jamaica	15,079	15,982	18,710	21,299	21,900	22,589	23,906	24,621	25,516	26,379
Japan	5,189,197	5,227,016	4,444,939	4,389,312	4,207,630	4,453,094	4,341,986	4,467,610	4,647,178	4,771,837
Jordan	47,999	50,775	53,593	56,203	58,701	61,697	64,880	68,501	72,254	76,206
Kazakhstan	171,082	197,112	225,496	261,840	291,480	305,998	397,921	433,400	455,701	484,002
Kenya	100,922	109,875	114,733	108,206	119,364	135,919	151,151	162,289	170,065	179,506
Kiribati	222	286	272	292	343	349	402	420	433	449
South Korea	1,744,455	1,943,893	1,802,760	1,843,950	1,880,777	1,881,748	2,245,847	2,539,463	2,681,311	2,805,778
Kosovo	7,728	9,418	9,375	10,470	11,200	12,449	14,154	15,517	16,697	17,886
Kuwait	111,048	148,346	183,539	165,474	160,902	157,199	146,911	175,355	186,539	189,351
Kyrgyzstan	8,283	9,256	12,269	15,187	18,175	22,625	26,687	30,016	33,124	36,008
Laos	18,511	18,533	15,121	15,007	15,088	16,906	18,388	19,682	20,860	22,011
Latvia	33,353	38,209	38,033	42,792	43,988	48,591	53,162	56,377	59,216	62,117
Lebanon	23,489	19,824	23,257	25,922	30,468	34,494				
Lesotho	2,092	2,443	2,275	2,227	2,514	2,766	3,102	3,218	3,355	3,501
Liberia	3,037	3,509	3,974	4,390	4,778	5,216	5,715	6,123	6,541	6,997
Libya	46,893	35,216	43,281	43,958	49,349	44,736	56,948	55,749	51,404	49,708
Liechtenstein	6,405	7,913	7,427	8,239	8,465	9,034	9,592	9,805	10,188	10,609
Lithuania	57,352	67,103	70,687	80,392	85,482	95,149	104,721	110,416	117,112	122,348
Luxembourg	73,612	86,444	80,865	88,814	93,252	101,100	108,330	112,721	117,104	121,956
Macau	25,280	30,634	24,930	45,627	49,467	52,061	54,656	57,839	60,882	63,698
Madagascar	13,051	14,355	15,342	16,037	17,593	19,468	20,975	22,723	25,110	27,657
Malawi	11,847	12,475	12,531	13,439	11,790	15,096	18,309	19,999	20,668	22,302
Malaysia	337,456	373,785	407,830	400,236	422,428	472,731	547,100	589,810	630,943	674,546
Maldives	3,706	5,240	6,168	6,611	7,052	7,759	8,148	8,671	9,186	9,744
Mali	20,777	23,061	22,645	24,842	26,821	31,232	34,909	37,762	40,475	43,380
Malta	16,392	19,768	18,999	22,621	24,973	27,854	30,508	32,319	34,153	36,175
Marshall Islands	242	261	259	265	287	303	338	366	384	401
Mauritania	8,464	9,126	9,564	10,724	10,941	12,603	14,264	14,794	15,722	16,610
Mauritius	11,408	11,484	12,908	14,072	14,938	16,073	16,944	18,157	19,206	20,233
Mexico	1,121,065	1,316,569	1,466,935	1,794,673	1,834,644	1,835,039	2,176,236	2,314,518	2,425,005	2,538,382
Federated States of Micronesia	373	392	415	443	484	507	531	564	580	598
Moldova	11,530	13,694	14,524	16,711	18,208	20,342	22,223	23,894	25,690	27,845
Mongolia	13,313	15,286	17,146	20,315	23,795	25,370	31,131	33,769	34,881	37,083
Montenegro	4,730	5,827	6,265	7,646	8,272	9,228	10,123	10,751	11,314	11,906
Morocco	121,354	142,022	131,245	146,636	162,393	183,973	195,632	207,553	223,246	241,387
Mozambique	14,235	16,168	18,884	20,921	22,800	23,603	24,769	26,193	27,431	28,930
Myanmar	77,012	55,237	67,421	66,780	76,712	82,309	83,172	85,607	92,056	100,472
Namibia	10,583	12,399	12,564	12,516	13,639	15,079	17,938	19,501	20,458	21,504
Nauru	125	149	181	161	168	176	196	215	224	234
Nepal	33,434	36,927	41,183	41,048	43,299	45,490	45,593	46,640	51,554	56,601
Netherlands	931,814	1,055,173	1,047,364	1,135,803	1,206,764	1,321,985	1,423,856	1,479,886	1,532,027	1,580,852
New Zealand	210,780	249,534	245,083	253,652	259,073	259,508	273,395	288,973	301,857	314,864
Nicaragua	12,730	14,208	15,634	17,813	19,697	22,237	25,404	28,933	30,853	32,900
Niger	13,764	14,923	15,458	16,952	19,734	21,270	23,367	25,355	27,308	29,477
Nigeria	598,725	609,479	645,682	487,347	252,109	290,491	386,671	467,900	485,066	510,898
North Macedonia	12,385	14,008	13,957	15,864	16,954	19,142	21,236	22,786	24,296	25,710
Norway	382,253	521,592	617,322	502,198	500,886	530,148	651,712	646,518	647,589	648,071
Oman	75,909	87,324	109,853	106,175	107,136	109,432	121,397	125,904	124,788	128,222
Pakistan	300,410	348,481	374,850	336,555	371,929	408,160	450,134			
Palau	259	236	247	275	318	352	373	397	416	434
Panama	57,060	67,396	76,479	83,812	86,524	90,463	96,471	102,708	109,581	117,086
Papua New Guinea	23,848	26,113	31,653	30,729	30,756	33,098	36,296	37,766	39,539	41,257
Paraguay	35,432	39,937	41,841	43,140	44,739	49,278	64,001	69,707	73,525	77,666
Peru	209,050	228,713	248,220	272,672	295,329	341,956	399,593	413,597	434,972	455,464
Philippines	361,751	394,087	404,353	437,055	461,671	487,086	501,692	545,399	590,711	640,900
Poland	605,930	689,253	695,734	812,959	921,667	1,040,549	1,133,088	1,206,515	1,276,008	1,349,144
Portugal	229,435	256,226	257,101	292,408	313,562	346,425	375,197	393,624	409,339	425,754
Puerto Rico	103,131	106,427	113,844	118,479	126,030	129,368	133,222	139,386	143,755	148,325
Qatar	144,411	179,732	235,709	217,309	218,448	215,560	203,044	245,166	265,021	278,383
Romania	250,961	285,275	295,891	347,829	382,650	429,289	470,091	500,036	534,899	564,711
Russia	1,488,118	1,828,927	2,296,410	2,034,681	2,185,848	2,572,315	2,861,156	2,675,035	2,638,379	2,620,753
Rwanda	10,488	11,250	13,744	14,805	15,111	16,373	18,673	20,166	21,463	22,913
Samoa	869	860	890	1,045	1,176	1,288	1,347	1,427	1,502	1,587
San Marino	1,543	1,857	1,833	2,028	2,087	2,253	2,434	2,506	2,571	2,647
São Tomé and Príncipe	476	529	546	696	831	981	1,123	1,248	1,366	1,483
Saudi Arabia	767,303	982,661	1,239,075	1,218,585	1,254,141	1,273,555	1,343,346	1,427,689	1,475,595	1,533,698
Senegal	24,566	27,535	27,843	30,701	32,177	37,076				
Serbia	55,874	65,830	66,810	81,344	90,088	99,953	111,204	120,274	127,917	136,432
Seychelles	1,383	1,487	2,000	2,172	2,229	2,327	2,366	2,489	2,604	2,736
Sierra Leone	6,682	7,166	7,121	6,401	6,959	7,711	8,520	8,835	9,299	9,743
Singapore	351,227	441,111	514,253	511,182	572,877	603,870	667,889	706,656	740,254	775,530
Slovakia	107,646	120,591	115,884	133,617	140,892	154,442	167,062	175,150	184,292	193,071
Slovenia	53,342	61,582	59,967	69,350	73,015	80,376	88,869	92,935	96,812	100,766
Solomon Islands	1,536	1,558	1,467	1,506	1,584	1,728	1,866	1,998	2,127	2,254
Somalia	8,705	9,570	10,301	11,317	12,347	13,234	14,820	16,017	17,523	19,170
South Africa	337,876	419,878	407,430	381,334	401,076	427,141	489,083	517,579	537,157	556,473
South Sudan	5,423	5,940	7,533	7,564	4,616	5,539	7,983	8,668	8,534	8,619
Spain	1,288,751	1,462,216	1,449,990	1,618,344	1,729,759	1,908,602	2,085,276	2,193,416	2,290,372	2,379,737
Sri Lanka	84,304	88,609	74,584	84,087	99,617	108,860	110,680	113,140	119,623	126,535
Saint Kitts and Nevis	867	843	963	1,034	1,051	1,076	1,147	1,214	1,275	1,336
Saint Lucia	1,522	1,871	2,320	2,441	2,605	2,656	2,757	2,877	2,995	3,117
Saint Vincent and the Grenadines	864	889	970	1,047	1,126	1,209	1,270	1,334	1,398	1,464
Sudan	35,215	35,131	33,461	33,580	27,084	36,502	30,861	27,175	29,855	32,930
Suriname	2,912	3,109	3,802	3,463	4,270	4,738	5,981	6,517	8,811	12,850
Sweden	544,266	631,693	575,071	578,991	609,695	676,540	745,081	768,414	808,659	843,057
Switzerland	755,700	840,120	858,257	931,970	978,042	1,060,696	1,135,739	1,163,357	1,217,078	1,264,062
Syria	60,043									
Taiwan	676,861	776,965	765,624	757,387	801,495	920,585	1,019,596	1,095,185	1,165,668	1,231,102
Tajikistan	8,134	8,934	10,716	12,242	14,426	17,542	21,114	23,045	24,767	26,603
Tanzania	63,373	67,964	74,173	78,368	79,236	89,614	96,181	103,978	114,502	126,021
Thailand	500,275	506,050	495,692	517,013	529,386	577,010	599,115	598,144	615,655	641,577
Timor-Leste	2,163	3,625	3,209	2,080	1,866	2,064	2,170	2,317	2,469	2,626
Togo	7,497	8,546	8,665	9,725	10,644	11,912	13,141	14,134	15,149	16,275
Tonga	512	521	553	599	648	692	727	775	798	821
Trinidad and Tobago	20,868	24,221	28,325	25,156	25,927	25,926	26,818	27,744	28,879	29,844
Tunisia	42,494	46,813	44,596	48,559	51,361	57,264	62,738	62,854	63,972	65,087
Turkey	730,345	827,673	924,752	1,153,295	1,360,954	1,602,867	1,817,987	1,950,781	2,073,795	2,187,071
Turkmenistan	45,455	49,477	56,677	62,814	68,675	77,398	83,000	90,457	95,139	100,580
Tuvalu	55	65	57	58	64	70	83	88	92	95
Uganda	37,897	42,814	47,238	52,067	57,000	66,451	72,242	80,409	89,001	97,692
Ukraine	156,618	199,766	161,990	181,222	190,834	214,233	229,406	245,439	259,371	269,477
United Arab Emirates	357,162	422,441	511,403	522,622	580,959	614,398	661,018	699,443	737,659	784,308
United Kingdom	2,734,940	3,209,353	3,204,984	3,439,830	3,713,618	4,012,224	4,268,446	4,488,949	4,699,727	4,933,478
United States	21,375,275	23,745,850	26,059,725	27,825,875	29,381,025	30,861,300	32,642,373	34,441,607	35,877,138	37,245,980
Uruguay	53,557	60,742	71,247	79,214	82,323	85,575	95,155	100,531	103,946	108,040
Uzbekistan	70,127	81,170	94,317	107,518	121,352	147,069	178,167	202,648	226,468	250,508
Vanuatu	1,128	1,060	1,130	1,198	1,265	1,306	1,386	1,466	1,545	1,620
Venezuela	20,012	39,136	79,519	76,762	103,713	101,492	124,184	130,649		
Vietnam	346,283	370,065	411,031	432,981	459,448	494,046	542,130	587,128	638,292	693,976
Palestine	15,532	18,109	19,166	18,635	16,017	17,167				
Yemen	10,783	10,203	11,107	9,364	8,069	7,860	10,982	10,680	10,543	10,503
Zambia	18,138	22,096	29,164	27,578	25,303	28,709	42,384	45,580	48,615	54,633
Zimbabwe	39,962	52,413	48,570	44,372	49,265	58,290	65,916	69,311	71,028	72,193

=== 2030s ===
The following list contains the various countries' projected GDP (nominal) from 2030 to 2031. The projections for future years presume that government policies do not change, and assume specific values for oil prices, bond rates, and exchange rates.

IMF estimates (2030s)
Country / territory	2030	2031
Afghanistan	19,711	
Albania	41,325	43,828
Algeria	338,241	343,308
Andorra	5,708	5,851
Angola	167,324	175,807
Antigua and Barbuda	2,863	2,993
Argentina	822,075	855,399
Armenia	41,238	44,094
Aruba	5,431	5,606
Australia	2,490,648	2,596,767
Austria	701,529	719,125
Azerbaijan	103,290	108,690
Bahamas	21,328	22,075
Bahrain	60,065	62,957
Bangladesh	628,857	674,363
Barbados	9,971	10,440
Belarus	130,602	137,368
Belgium	868,720	890,985
Belize	3,845	3,947
Benin	38,330	41,734
Bhutan	6,031	6,596
Bolivia	53,843	
Bosnia and Herzegovina	47,088	49,546
Botswana	30,418	33,031
Brazil	3,222,421	3,398,245
Brunei	18,822	19,440
Bulgaria	189,058	198,362
Burkina Faso	41,858	44,579
Burundi	9,972	10,345
Cape Verde	4,467	4,771
Cambodia	72,295	78,399
Cameroon	86,258	91,802
Canada	2,998,214	3,134,116
Central African Republic	6,566	6,993
Chad	32,348	34,660
Chile	466,592	486,468
China	27,081,473	28,553,669
Colombia	727,375	762,670
Comoros	2,114	2,209
Democratic Republic of the Congo	158,442	169,267
Republic of the Congo	20,429	21,420
Costa Rica	145,882	154,001
Ivory Coast	153,560	166,812
Croatia	140,023	146,022
Cyprus	54,921	57,633
Czech Republic	502,699	519,724
Denmark	585,663	609,646
Djibouti	6,354	6,784
Dominica	939	979
Dominican Republic	193,418	206,978
Ecuador	163,815	171,300
Egypt	612,781	664,997
El Salvador	48,607	51,144
Equatorial Guinea	14,601	15,064
Eritrea	1,982	
Estonia	60,995	63,562
Eswatini	7,351	7,712
Ethiopia	215,029	245,923
Fiji	7,974	8,618
Finland	385,278	397,705
France	3,968,754	4,069,413
Gabon	28,167	29,059
Gambia	4,101	4,447
Georgia	64,108	70,072
Germany	6,154,086	6,301,487
Ghana	153,973	164,258
Greece	356,537	370,019
Grenada	1,877	1,967
Guatemala	179,643	194,199
Guinea	68,987	75,744
Guinea-Bissau	3,909	4,151
Guyana	48,684	50,559
Haiti	55,966	59,529
Honduras	51,793	54,816
Hong Kong	544,161	570,919
Hungary	321,850	337,547
Iceland	52,082	54,499
India	6,129,559	6,744,026
Indonesia	2,065,322	2,228,297
Iran	349,741	362,927
Iraq	330,975	346,377
Ireland	850,359	881,715
Israel	922,638	966,589
Italy	2,958,706	3,017,029
Jamaica	27,291	28,235
Japan	4,879,015	4,999,053
Jordan	80,417	84,869
Kazakhstan	518,247	553,359
Kenya	191,041	203,811
Kiribati	465	481
South Korea	2,930,688	3,069,314
Kosovo	19,079	20,248
Kuwait	193,347	197,883
Kyrgyzstan	38,188	39,892
Laos	23,120	24,277
Latvia	65,017	67,811
Lebanon	34,494	
Lesotho	3,652	3,808
Liberia	7,500	8,062
Libya	48,222	46,633
Liechtenstein	11,048	11,498
Lithuania	128,182	133,982
Luxembourg	127,009	131,850
Macau	66,811	69,751
Madagascar	30,372	33,210
Malawi	23,831	25,022
Malaysia	720,170	767,231
Maldives	10,337	10,968
Mali	46,537	49,777
Malta	38,362	40,716
Marshall Islands	418	435
Mauritania	17,163	17,695
Mauritius	21,332	22,499
Mexico	2,654,421	2,778,472
Federated States of Micronesia	616	632
Moldova	30,172	32,857
Mongolia	39,706	42,590
Montenegro	12,520	13,131
Morocco	260,855	281,351
Mozambique	32,497	37,518
Myanmar	103,807	107,254
Namibia	22,556	23,659
Nauru	244	254
Nepal	62,237	68,208
Netherlands	1,630,312	1,676,171
New Zealand	327,863	341,621
Nicaragua	35,083	37,411
Niger	31,853	34,314
Nigeria	542,229	578,231
North Macedonia	27,026	28,253
Norway	651,157	656,200
Oman	132,568	136,904
Pakistan	450,134	
Palau	452	470
Panama	124,922	133,205
Papua New Guinea	43,258	45,797
Paraguay	82,034	86,661
Peru	477,009	502,012
Philippines	695,434	754,112
Poland	1,423,386	1,499,881
Portugal	442,344	457,888
Puerto Rico	153,196	158,314
Qatar	292,582	303,337
Romania	596,598	627,338
Russia	2,626,297	2,641,453
Rwanda	24,521	26,520
Samoa	1,665	1,747
San Marino	2,725	2,805
São Tomé and Príncipe	1,609	1,745
Saudi Arabia	1,601,126	1,675,471
Senegal	37,076	
Serbia	145,398	155,144
Seychelles	2,869	2,990
Sierra Leone	10,217	10,735
Singapore	812,475	850,993
Slovakia	201,160	208,155
Slovenia	105,180	109,374
Solomon Islands	2,392	2,538
Somalia	20,831	22,716
South Africa	577,290	598,930
South Sudan	8,812	8,988
Spain	2,475,923	2,567,703
Sri Lanka	133,824	141,548
Saint Kitts and Nevis	1,398	1,462
Saint Lucia	3,241	3,369
Saint Vincent and the Grenadines	1,534	1,607
Sudan	35,973	40,292
Suriname	13,148	13,462
Sweden	879,651	916,985
Switzerland	1,320,704	1,370,705
Syria	60,043	
Taiwan	1,303,062	1,363,188
Tajikistan	28,635	31,129
Tanzania	138,555	153,973
Thailand	669,330	699,468
Timor-Leste	2,789	2,958
Togo	17,514	18,846
Tonga	850	882
Trinidad and Tobago	30,689	31,516
Tunisia	66,722	69,564
Turkey	2,307,501	2,436,253
Turkmenistan	107,195	114,404
Tuvalu	99	103
Uganda	106,486	115,823
Ukraine	283,511	300,252
United Arab Emirates	823,724	865,565
United Kingdom	5,182,192	5,442,279
United States	38,604,620	39,960,668
Uruguay	113,083	118,441
Uzbekistan	276,231	304,124
Vanuatu	1,700	1,781
Venezuela	130,649	
Vietnam	750,052	806,901
Palestine	17,167	
Yemen	10,549	10,675
Zambia	59,105	63,927
Zimbabwe	73,383	74,584

== Centre for Economics and Business Research estimate for 2040 ==
The following table is a nominal GDP estimate for the top 190 largest economies in 2040 made by British think tank Centre for Economics and Business Research in December 2025. Total GDP figures have been divided by UN population projections for the year 2040.

Largest economies by GDP (2040)
Country / territory	GDP (billions USD)	GDP per capita	Population
United States	52,852	144,627	362,685,952
China	47,877	35,375	1,327,848,192
India	14,092	8,498	1,622,580,039
Germany	7,783	94,098	79,497,160
United Kingdom	6,784	89,100	73,484,672
Japan	5,922	52,208	111,581,160
France	5,203	73,203	69,385,936
Indonesia	4,182	12,955	311,797,395
Brazil	3,943	17,644	219,237,084
Canada	3,818	83,873	45,059,368
Italy	3,771	66,178	54,601,860
Spain	3,373	62,073	47,209,992
South Korea	3,297	65,229	48,574,336
Australia	3,289	100,419	30,668,762
Mexico	3,268	21,988	144,624,323
Russia	3,247	23,469	138,213,600
Saudi Arabia	2,890	60,597	44,045,372
Netherlands	2,142	110,539	18,679,362
Turkey	2,053	22,454	88,876,672
Argentina	2,009	37,599	47,817,645
Poland	1,828	53,357	33,297,892
Switzerland	1,639	165,672	9,306,308
Taiwan	1,521	67,113	23,000,000
Philippines	1,500	11,340	129,546,659
Bangladesh	1,448	7,177	202,589,429
United Arab Emirates	1,412	108,217	13,470,551
Vietnam	1,407	12,559	108,437,635
Ireland	1,234	195,979	5,672,630
Belgium	1,106	89,469	11,943,662
Israel	1,063	81,360	12,238,294
Malaysia	1,060	26,674	41,509,644
Singapore	1,058	156,744	6,352,645
Thailand	1,037	14,774	69,535,002
Sweden	1,019	87,303	10,987,637
Austria	894	95,152	10,987,637
Egypt	869	5,942	145,213,654
Colombia	827	14,009	58,576,446
Pakistan	812	2,576	324,937,697
Norway	806	129,409	5,795,898
Romania	764	44,608	17,202,350
Hong Kong	758	96,925	6,841,257
Denmark	751	114,557	6,096,822
Iraq	699	10,948	62,223,211
South Africa	693	8,856	74,035,624
Nigeria	688	2,125	312,710,416
Kazakhstan	650	27,243	24,246,823
Czech Republic	630	61,188	10,286,990
Chile	597	27,471	20,542,103
Iran	594	5,913	99,524,277
Portugal	588	55,999	10,274,446
Peru	572	14,335	38,794,649
Algeria	526	9,125	54,873,476
Finland	516	92,280	5,438,792
Qatar	500	141,226	3,474,059
Greece	484	48,913	9,660,546
New Zealand	476	78,714	5,658,654
Ethiopia	461	3,158	188,450,902
Ukraine	435	12,319	35,270,911
Hungary	413	45,125	8,939,447
Morocco	389	9,095	42,168,205
Dominican Republic	347	28,302	12,579,320
Kenya	343	4,960	74,108,863
Uzbekistan	342	6,753	46,044,152
Kuwait	322	48,309	5,756,196
Ivory Coast	318	6,480	45,743,925
Slovakia	289	55,650	5,102,848
Tanzania	275	2,653	103,999,359
Guatemala	271	11,918	22,626,870
Oman	260	30,078	6,931,974
Ecuador	246	12,064	20,434,220
Costa Rica	226	37,726	5,369,806
Bulgaria	221	40,424	5,611,630
Panama	218	40,804	5,286,592
Serbia	213	36,411	5,834,853
Croatia	209	56,215	3,474,467
Uganda	202	2,611	72,020,418
DR Congo	202	1,178	172,595,582
Sri Lanka	201	8,019	23,159,442
Ghana	201	4,408	44,568,350
Puerto Rico	198	64,133	2,783,742
Angola	197	3,063	58,965,321
Lithuania	193	74,238	2,506,043
Luxembourg	179	204,064	762,757
Slovenia	153	71,651	2,044,485
Uruguay	152	44,151	3,336,459
Azerbaijan	152	12,634	10,918,934
Cameroon	141	3,142	42,208,003
Cambodia	131	6,481	20,540,682
Turkmenistan	127	15,994	8,932,231
Nepal	119	3,972	32,909,537
Jordan	115	8,715	14,471,297
Belarus	113	13,529	8,120,727
Myanmar	108	1,844	58,169,858
Bahrain	106	49,676	1,914,988
Macau	105	134,158	658,829
Paraguay	104	12,578	8,087,572
Latvia	103	58,798	1,636,175
Georgia	102	27,856	3,622,271
Libya	97	11,910	8,651,417
Estonia	92	70,552	1,249,939
Senegal	89	3,173	25,797,510
Honduras	87	6,243	13,484,653
Tunisia	85	6,267	12,953,864
Sudan	85	1,159	71,730,599
Cyprus	83	81,356	1,484,849
Guinea	80	3,540	20,160,750
El Salvador	74	10,821	6,640,752
Zimbabwe	74	3,156	22,250,109
Bolivia	70	4,645	14,899,397
Benin	70	3,104	20,445,760
Armenia	69	23,905	2,732,210
Papua New Guinea	68	3,947	13,376,160
Zambia	68	2,130	31,550,402
Guyana	67	78,685	907,506
Mali	67	1,714	37,413,643
Malta	66	95,935	572,532
Mongolia	66	15,731	4,147,692
Niger	66	1,349	42,316,740
Iceland	63	126,638	418,311
Albania	62	26,353	2,050,130
Bosnia and Herzegovina	62	19,247	2,745,010
Burkina Faso	60	1,784	32,193,645
Mozambique	60	1,119	52,124,215
Rwanda	55	2,881	19,440,770
Kyrgyzstan	54	5,695	8,786,095
Botswana	50	14,354	3,126,640
Chad	49	1,685	31,307,342
Trinidad and Tobago	48	31,501	1,338,552
Madagascar	47	1,021	44,846,895
Gabon	44	13,865	3,452,988
Nicaragua	42	5,065	8,189,914
Moldova	39	20,350	1,992,135
Tajikistan	39	2,969	13,713,947
Somalia	37	1,424	29,896,287
North Macedonia	36	21,902	1,640,264
Jamaica	36	13,048	2,676,100
Brunei	34	65,045	505,976
Mauritius	34	27,755	1,179,759
Congo	33	3,480	9,083,971
Haiti	32	2,131	13,733,853
Togo	31	2,219	13,121,352
Namibia	29	7,179	3,962,405
Kosovo	28	18,214	1,583,747
Laos	28	2,957	9,169,002
Bahamas	27	58,107	420,346
Mauritania	26	3,908	7,681,908
Yemen	25	408	59,181,526
Equatorial Guinea	22	9,068	2,665,586
Malawi	21	576	31,302,098
Montenegro	18	29,118	558,057
Sierra Leone	18	1,520	11,398,400
Maldives	17	34,969	564,798
Suriname	15.7	19,696	707,160
Liberia	14.1	1,798	7,681,688
Djibouti	13.6	10,795	1,406,635
Barbados	13.0	43,490	276,346
Fiji	12.9	12,832	983,858
Burundi	10.7	489	20,131,318
Bhutan	10.6	12,051	862,129
Eswatini	10.6	7,661	1,429,781
South Sudan	7.8	335	16,101,480
Cape Verde	7.7	13,791	557,374
Aruba	7.2	66,500	104,278
Andorra	7.1	60,265	85,668
Central African Republic	6.9	766	8,526,455
Gambia	6.6	1,576	3,732,798
Belize	5.7	11,009	491,595
Guinea-Bissau	5.7	2,092	2,969,702
Seychelles	5.1	43,432	131,930
Timor-Leste	4.9	2,841	1,718,249
Saint Lucia	4.5	22,921	179,293
Antigua and Barbuda	4.1	33,401	97,133
Lesotho	3.8	1,335	2,757,876
Solomon Islands	3.7	3,445	1,135,455
Comoros	3.5	2,802	1,133,778
San Marino	3.4	94,760	34,370
Grenada	3.0	24,299	116,493
Saint Vincent and the Grenadines	2.4	21,876	92,650
Western Samoa	2.3	9,821	247,196
Saint Kitts and Nevis	2.2	40,492	46,313
Vanuatu	2.2	3,892	451,512
São Tomé and Príncipe	1.7	5,232	315,842
Dominica	1.4	18,502	63,799
Tonga	0.9	9,292	102,565
Federated States of Micronesia	0.8	7,917	121,681
Palau	0.7	42,798	16,602
Marshall Islands	0.6	22,558	26,597
Kiribati	0.6	3,645	164,700
Nauru	0.3	18,879	14,039
Tuvalu	0.1	10,240	9,140

The 30 largest economies in the world (current prices in billions of USD)
Country	2025	Country	2030	Country	2035	Country	2040
United States	30,767	United States	37,677	United States	44,016	United States	52,852
China	19,626	China	26,046	China	36,250	China	47,877
Germany	5,048	Germany	6,178	India	9,500	India	14,092
Japan	4,435	India	6,173	Germany	6,707	Germany	7,783
United Kingdom	4,003	United Kingdom	5,148	United Kingdom	5,584	United Kingdom	6,784
India	3,916	Japan	5,002	Japan	5,259	Japan	5,922
France	3,368	France	4,004	France	4,477	France	5,203
Russia	2,587	Brazil	3,203	Italy	3,299	Indonesia	4,182
Italy	2,550	Italy	3,045	Brazil	3,284	Brazil	3,943
Canada	2,319	Canada	3,008	Canada	3,227	Canada	3,818
Brazil	2,279	Russia	2,591	Indonesia	2,979	Italy	3,771
Spain	1,903	Mexico	2,548	Russia	2,813	Spain	3,373
South Korea	1,872	Australia	2,483	Spain	2,786	South Korea	3,297
Australia	1,839	Spain	2,472	South Korea	2,754	Australia	3,289
Mexico	1,832	South Korea	2,266	Australia	2,740	Mexico	3,268
Turkey	1,597	Indonesia	2,081	Mexico	2,721	Russia	3,247
Indonesia	1,445	Turkey	1,933	Saudi Arabia	2,250	Saudi Arabia	2,890
Netherlands	1,332	Netherlands	1,654	Netherlands	1,824	Netherlands	2,142
Saudi Arabia	1,276	Saudi Arabia	1,649	Argentina	1,575	Turkey	2,053
Switzerland	1,043	Poland	1,387	Turkey	1,574	Argentina	2,009
Poland	1,035	Switzerland	1,346	Poland	1,482	Poland	1,828
Taiwan	920	Taiwan	1,214	Switzerland	1,372	Switzerland	1,639
Belgium	724	Sweden	909	Taiwan	1,249	Taiwan	1,521
Ireland	718	Ireland	893	United Arab Emirates	1,070	Philippines	1,500
Argentina	681	Israel	875	Philippines	1,047	Bangladesh	1,448
Sweden	668	Belgium	863	Ireland	1,017	United Arab Emirates	1,412
Israel	610	Argentina	833	Vietnam	994	Vietnam	1,407
Singapore	603	Singapore	787	Bangladesh	991	Ireland	1,234
Austria	579	United Arab Emirates	770	Belgium	952	Belgium	1,106
Thailand	577	Philippines	715	Israel	879	Israel	1,063

== CIA estimates in 1990 ==
GDP (Nominal) data in 1990, with some countries only GNP (Nominal) was provided by the CIA World Factbook.

Country / territory	GDP (or GNP) in millions
United States	$5,233,300
Soviet Union	$2,659,500
Japan	$1,914,100
Germany	$945,700
France	$819,600
United Kingdom	$818,000
Italy	$803,300
Canada	$513,600
People's Republic of China	$413,000
Spain	$398,700
Brazil	$377,000
India	$333,000
Australia	$240,800
Netherlands	$205,900
South Korea	$200,000
Mexico	$187,000
Polish People's Republic	$172,400
German Democratic Republic	$159,500
Belgium	$136,000
Sweden	$132,700
Yugoslavia	$129,500
Czechoslovakia	$123,200
Taiwan	$121,400
Switzerland	$119,500
Austria	$103,200
Iran	$97,600
South Africa	$83,500
Indonesia	$80,000
Socialist Republic of Romania	$79,800
Norway	$75,800
Turkey	$75,000
Finland	$74,400
Denmark	$73,700
Saudi Arabia	$73,000
Portugal	$72,100
Argentina	$72,000
Hungarian People's Republic	$64,600
Thailand	$64,500
British Hong Kong	$57,000
Greece	$56,300
Algeria	$54,100
Venezuela	$52,000
People's Republic of Bulgaria	$51,200
Pakistan	$43,200
Philippines	$40,500
New Zealand	$39,100
Egypt	$38,300
Israel	$38,000
Malaysia	$37,900
Colombia	$35,400
Iraq	$35,000
Ireland	$31,400
Nigeria	$30,000
North Korea	$28,000
Singapore	$27,500
Chile	$25,300
United Arab Emirates	$23,300
Morocco	$21,900
Cuba	$20,900
Bangladesh	$20,600
Kuwait	$20,500
Libya	$20,000
Peru	$18,900
Syria	$18,500
Puerto Rico	$18,400
Socialist Republic of Vietnam	$14,200
Cameroon	$12,900
Burma	$11,000
Guatemala	$10,800
Ivory Coast	$10,000
Ecuador	$9,800
Paraguay	$8,900
Uruguay	$8,800
Tunisia	$8,700
Kenya	$8,500
Sudan	$8,500
Oman	$7,800
People's Democratic Republic of Ethiopia	$6,600
Zaire	$6,500
Luxembourg	$6,300
Sri Lanka	$6,100
Tanzania	$5,920
El Salvador	$5,500
Yemen Arab Republic	$5,500
Qatar	$5,400
Jordan	$5,200
Ghana	$5,200
Dominican Republic	$5,100
Senegal	$5,000
People's Republic of Angola	$5,000
Uganda	$4,900
Costa Rica	$4,700
Zimbabwe	$4,600
Bolivia	$4,600
Honduras	$4,400
Cyprus	$4,200
Zambia	$4,000
Iceland	$4,000
Panama	$3,900
Jamaica	$3,800
People's Socialist Republic of Albania	$3,800
Trinidad and Tobago	$3,750
Bahrain	$3,500
Brunei	$3,300
Papua New Guinea	$3,260
Gabon	$3,200
Democratic Republic of Afghanistan	$3,000
Nepal	$2,900
Portuguese Macau	$2,700
Guinea	$2,500
The Bahamas	$2,400
Haiti	$2,400
Niger	$2,400
Reunion	$2,400
Lebanon	$2,300
Rwanda	$2,300
French Polynesia	$2,240
People's Republic of the Congo	$2,200
Mali	$1,940
Malta	$1,900
Mauritius	$1,900
Botswana	$1,870
Mongolian People's Republic	$1,700
Nicaragua	$1,700
Madagascar	$1,700
People's Republic of Benin	$1,700
Somali Democratic Republic	$1,700
People's Republic of Mozambique	$1,600
Namibia	$1,540
Burkina Faso	$1,430
Malawi	$1,400
Togo	$1,350
Fiji	$1,320
Burundi	$1,300
Barbados	$1,300
Martinique	$1,300
Bermuda	$1,300
Suriname	$1,270
Central African Republic	$1,270
South Yemen	$1,200
Guadeloupe	$1,100
Virgin Islands	$1,030
West Bank	$1,000
Guam	$1,000
Mauritania	$1,000
Netherlands Antilles	$1,000
Liberia	$988
Sierra Leone	$965
Chad	$902
People's Republic of Kampuchea	$890
New Caledonia	$860
Faroe Islands	$662
Liechtenstein	$630
Aruba	$620
Lao People's Democratic Republic	$585
Swaziland	$539
Greenland	$500
Isle of Man	$490
Lesotho	$412
San Marino	$393
Gaza Strip	$380
Antigua and Barbuda	$353
Djibouti	$333
Monaco	$324
Guyana	$323
Bhutan	$273
Seychelles	$255
Cayman Islands	$238
Belize	$225.60
French Guiana	$210.00
Comoros	$207.00
The Gambia	$195.00
American Samoa	$190.00
St. Lucia	$172.00
Northern Mariana Islands	$165.00
Cape Verde	$158.00
Solomon Islands	$156.00
Guinea-Bissau	$152.00
Micronesia, Federated States of	$150.00
Dominica	$137.00
Maldives	$136.00
St. Vincent and the Grenadines	$136.00
Grenada	$129.70
Gibraltar	$129.00
Vanuatu	$120.00
St. Kitts and Nevis	$119.00
Western Samoa	$112.00
British Virgin Islands	$106.70
Equatorial Guinea	$103.00
Nauru	$90.00
Tonga	$86.00
Marshall Islands	$63.00
Saint Pierre and Miquelon	$50.00
Montserrat	$45.40
Turks and Caicos Islands	$44.90
Cook Islands	$40.00
Sao Tome and Principe	$37.90
Kiribati	$34.00
Trust Territory of the Pacific Islands	$31.60
Anguilla	$23.00
Wallis and Futuna	$6.70
Tuvalu	$4.60
Niue	$2.10
Tokelau	$1.40
GDP (nominal) GNP (nominal)

== GDP milestones by countries (in trillions USD) ==
The following is a list of countries reaching (or projected to reach) a certain threshold of nominal GDP in a specific year according to International Monetary Fund, United Nations, and World Bank.

=== 1–6 trillion ===
1 trillion USD		2 trillion USD		3 trillion USD		4 trillion USD		5 trillion USD		6 trillion USD	
Year	Country	Year	Country	Year	Country	Year	Country	Year	Country	Year	Country
1969	United States	1977	United States	1980	European Union	1984	United States	1988	United States	1990	European Union
1973	European Union	1978	European Union	1981	United States	1987	European Union	1989	European Union	1991	United States
1979	Japan	1986	Japan	1988	Japan	1993	Japan	1995	Japan	2010	China
1987	West Germany	1992	Germany	2006	Germany	2008	China	2009	China	2011	Japan
1988	France	2003	United Kingdom	2007	China	2018	Germany	2025	Germany	2030	India*
1989	United Kingdom	2004	France	2007	United Kingdom	2025	United Kingdom	2029	India*	2030	Germany*
1990	Italy	2005	China	2021	India	2026	India	2030	United Kingdom*		
1998	China	2007	Italy	2023	France	2031	France*				
2004	Spain	2010	Brazil	2029	Brazil*						
2004	Canada	2011	Russia	2031	South Korea*						
2006	Brazil	2014	India	2031	Canada*						
2006	South Korea	2021	Canada	2031	Italy*						
2006	Russia	2026	South Korea								
2006	Mexico	2026	Mexico								
2007	India	2026	Australia								
2008	Australia	2026	Spain								
2017	Indonesia	2028	Turkey*								
2021	Netherlands	2030	Indonesia*								
2022	Saudi Arabia										
2023	Turkey										
2025	Switzerland										
2025	Poland										
2026	Taiwan										

* Future projections are marked with an asterisk.

=== 10–30 trillion ===
10 trillion USD		15 trillion USD		20 trillion USD		30 trillion USD	
Year	Country	Year	Country	Year	Country	Year	Country
2000	United States	2008	European Union	2018	United States	2025	United States
2004	European Union	2010	United States	2025	European Union		
2014	China	2020	China	2026	China		

== See also ==
- List of countries by GDP (nominal)
- List of countries by GDP (nominal) per capita
- List of countries by past and projected GDP (nominal) per capita
- List of countries by GDP (PPP)
- List of countries by GDP (PPP) per capita
- List of countries by past and projected GDP (PPP)
- List of countries by past and projected GDP (PPP) per capita
