= Economy of the Cook Islands =

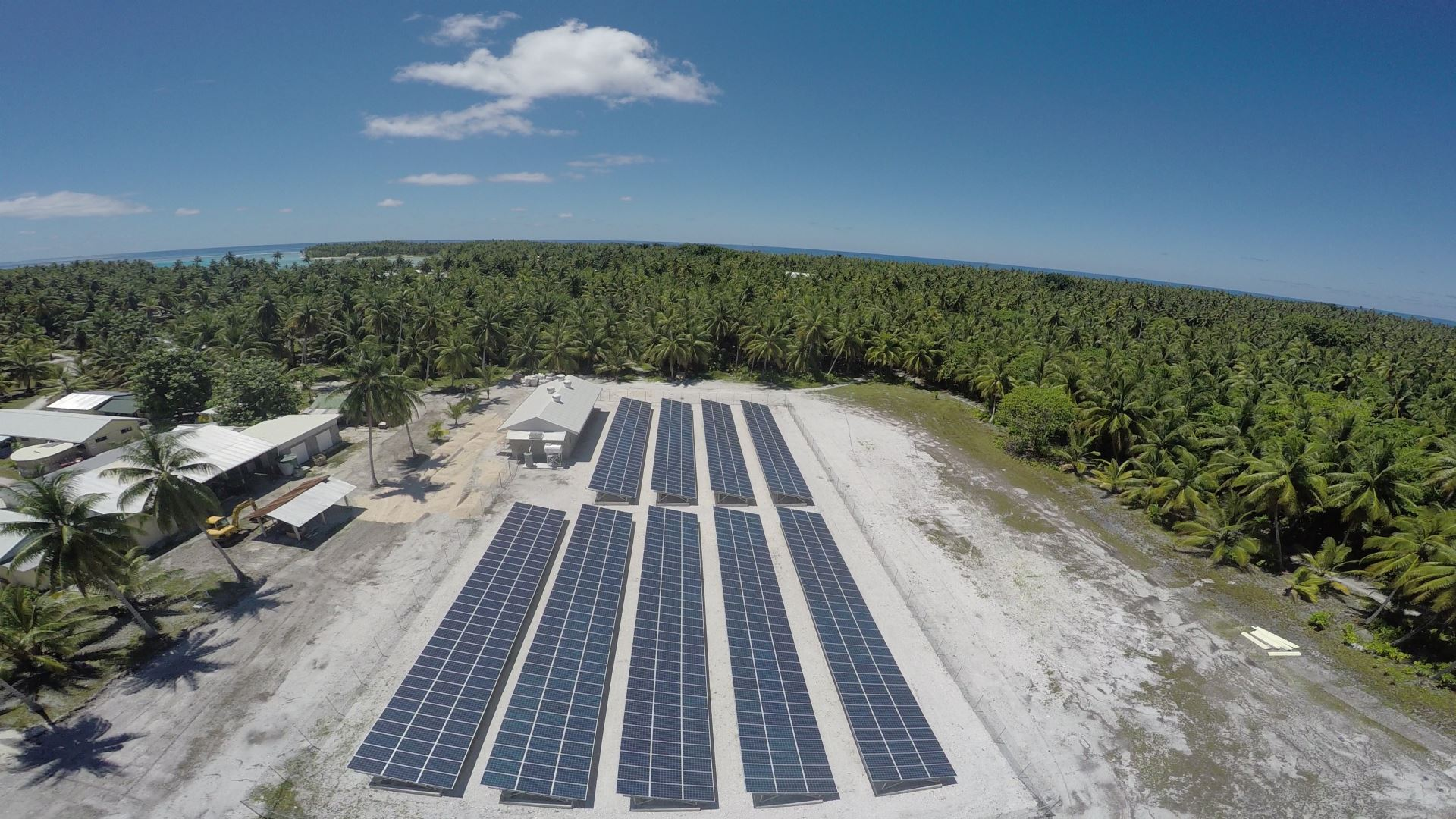
A solar panel array on Pukapuka

The economy of the Cook Islands is based mainly on tourism, with minor exports of tropical and citrus fruit. Manufacturing activities in the Cook Islands are limited to fruit-processing, clothing and handicrafts.

As in many other South Pacific nations, the economy is hindered by the country's isolation from foreign markets, lack of land and other natural resources aside from fish, periodic devastation from natural disasters, inadequate infrastructure, and lack of capital for diversification. Efforts to exploit tourism potential, encourage offshore banking, and expand the mining and fishing industries have been partially successful in stimulating investment and growth. Trade deficits are made up for by remittances from emigrants and by foreign aid, overwhelmingly from New Zealand.

== Tourism ==
Tourism makes up about 70% of GDP, with visitor numbers at record levels in 2025, after rebounding following the COVID-19 pandemic, when tourism collapsed due to closure of the border. Per capita GDP had dropped from US$22,121 (2019) to $16,268 (2021) due to the pandemic and the economy's heavy reliance on tourism.

== Banking and finance ==
Banks in the Cook Islands are regulated under the Banking Act 2011. Banks must be licensed and are supervised by the Cook Islands Financial Supervisory Commission.

The Cook Islands developed an offshore financial services industry in the early 1980s. Allegations that New Zealand-based companies were using it as a tax haven led to the Winebox Inquiry in New Zealand in the 1990s, and in 2000 it was listed as a tax haven by the OECD. In 2002 it was delisted after it agreed to fiscal transparency and to exchange tax information. Allegations of being a tax haven re-emerged in 2013 following the International Consortium of Investigative Journalists Offshore Leaks. Trusts incorporated in the Cook Islands are used to provide anonymity and asset-protection. The Cook Islands also featured in the Panama Papers, Paradise Papers, and Pandora Papers financial leaks.

The Bank of the Cook Islands was created in 2001 by merging the Cook Islands Development Bank and the Cook Islands Savings Bank. Economist Vaine Nooana-Arioka has been executive director of the Bank of the Cook Islands since 2008.

== Mining ==
In 2019, the Cook Islands passed the Sea Bed Minerals (SBM) Act.

In 2022, the Cook Islands Seabed Minerals Authority (SBMA) granted three exploration licenses for polymetallic nodules within their Exclusive Economic Zone to private companies Cobalt (CIC) Limited, Moana Minerals Limited and Cook Islands Investment Company (CIIC) Seabed Resources Limited, which is co-owned by the Cook Islands Government. The licenses expire in 2027.

In 2025, the Cook Islands announced that it had signed a five-year agreement with China focused on exploration and research into seabed minerals.

== Telecommunications ==
Telecom Cook Islands Ltd (TCI) is the sole provider of telecommunications in the Cook Islands. It is a private company owned by Spark New Zealand Ltd (60%) and the Cook Islands Government (40%). In operation since July 1991, TCI provides local, national and international telecommunications as well as internet access on all islands except Suwarrow. Communications to Suwarrow is via HF radio.

== Statistics ==
Exports of the Cook Islands by product category (2019) Chemical products Transportation Machines Mineral products Plastics and rubbers Metals Foodstuffs Precious metals Textiles Instruments Animal products Vegetable products Paper goods Footwear and headwear Miscellaneous Stone and glass Wood products Animal and vegetable bi-products Animal hides Arts and antiques Weapons

GDP
Purchasing power parity – $183.2 million (2005 est.)
GDP – per capita
US$30,033 (2025)
GDP – composition by sector
- Agriculture: 15.1%
- Industry: 9.6%
- Services: 75.3% (2000)
Population below poverty line
28.4% of the population lives below the national poverty line. Statistics 2016 Asian Development Bank
Household income or consumption by percentage share
- Lowest 10%: NA%
- Highest 10%: NA%
Inflation rate (consumer prices)
4.2% (2024 est.)
Labour force
6,820 (2001)
Labour force – by occupation
Agriculture 29%, industry 15%, services 56% (1995)
Unemployment rate
1.3% (2019)
Budget
- Revenues: $70.95 million
- Expenditures: $69.05 million; including capital expenditures of $5.744 million (FY00/01 est.)
Industries
Fruit processing, tourism, fishing, clothing, handicrafts
Industrial production growth rate
1% (2002)
Electricity – production
28 GW·h (2003)
Electricity – production by source
- Fossil fuel: 100%
- Hydro: 0%
- Nuclear: 0%
- Other: 0% (2001)
Electricity – consumption
34.46 GW·h (2005 est)
Electricity – exports
0 kW·h (2003)
Electricity – imports
0 kW·h (2003)
Oil consumption
400 bbl/d (64 m^{3}/d) (2003)
Agriculture – products
Copra, citrus, pineapples, tomatoes, beans, pawpaws, bananas, yams, taro, coffee, pigs, poultry
Exports
$5.222 million (2005)
Exports – commodities
Copra, papayas, fresh and canned citrus fruit, coffee; fish; pearls and pearl shells; clothing
Exports – partners
Australia 34%, Japan 27%, New Zealand 25%, US 8% (2004)
Imports
$81.04 million (2005)
Imports – commodities
Foodstuffs, textiles, fuels, timber, capital goods
Imports – partners
New Zealand 61%, Fiji 19%, US 9%, Australia 6%, Japan 2% (2004)
Debt – external
$141 million (1996 est.)
Economic aid – recipient
$13.1 million (1995); note – New Zealand furnishes the greater part
Currency
1 New Zealand dollar (NZ$) = 100 cents
Exchange rates
New Zealand dollars (NZ$) per US$1 – 1.4203 (2005), 1.9451 (January 2000), 1.8886 (1999), 1.8632 (1998), 1.5083 (1997), 1.4543 (1996), 1.5235 (1995)
Fiscal year
1 April–31 March
