= Vaine Nooana-Arioka =

CEO of Cook Islands bank

Vaine Nooana-Arioka is a Cook Islands economist. She has been Chief Executive of the Bank of the Cook Islands (BCI) since 2008. Under her leadership, BCI launched its internet banking service in 2015. As of 2018 she was one of five women on the board of the Association of Developing Financing Institutions in the Pacific. In 2012 she enabled a new collaboration with the government to encourage sustainable pearl farming in the region. she has also spoken out on the importance of financial institutions in supporting initiatives that enable climate crisis resilience. She has held a variety of advisory and non-executive roles in the region, including for the Cook Islands Business Trade and Investment Board, Cook Islands Women's Counselling Centre, Cook Islands Girl Guides and for the Red Cross in the Cook Islands. In her role at BCI, she has supported the Steering Committee for Gender Equality. She has an MA in Masters in International Economics and Finance from the University of Queensland.
