= List of countries by GDP (PPP) =

Selection of GDP (PPP) data (top 10 countries and blocs) in no particular order

GDP (PPP) means gross domestic product based on purchasing power parity. This article includes a list of countries by their forecast estimated GDP (PPP). Countries are sorted by GDP (PPP) forecast estimates from financial and statistical institutions that calculate using market or government official exchange rates. The data given on this page are based on the international dollar, a standardized unit used by economists. Certain regions that are not widely considered countries such as Hong Kong also show up in the list if they are distinct jurisdiction areas or economic entities.

GDP comparisons using PPP are arguably more useful than those using nominal GDP when assessing the domestic market of a state because PPP takes into account the relative cost of local goods, services and inflation rates of the country, rather than using international market exchange rates, which may distort the real differences in per capita income. For example, while the nominal GDP ranks of Germany and India are third and fourth respectively, when adjusted for PPP Germany's GDP drops to sixth and India rises to third because the local cost of goods in India is lower, and thus the same nominal amount of money can buy more goods and services in India.

GDP adjusted for PPP, however, is limited when measuring financial flows between countries and when comparing the quality of the same goods among countries. PPP is often used to gauge global poverty thresholds and is used by the United Nations in constructing the Human Development Index. These surveys such as the International Comparison Program include both tradable and non-tradable goods in an attempt to estimate a representative basket of all goods.

Largest economies in the world by PPP-adjusted GDP in 2026
according to International Monetary Fund estimates

== Tables ==
The first set of data on the left columns of the table includes estimates for the year 2023 made for each economy of the 196 economies (189 U.N. member states and 7 areas of Aruba, Hong Kong, Kosovo, Macau, Palestine, Puerto Rico, and Taiwan) covered by the International Monetary Fund (IMF)'s International Financial Statistics (IFS) database. The data is in millions of international dollars and was calculated and published by the IMF in October 2023. The second table includes data, mostly for the year 2022, for 180 of the 193 current United Nations member states as well as Hong Kong and Macau (the two Chinese Special Administrative Regions). Data are in millions of international dollars; they were compiled by the World Bank. The third table is a tabulation of the CIA World Factbook GDP (PPP) data update of 2019. The data for GDP at purchasing power parity has also been rebased using the new International Comparison Program price surveys and extrapolated to 2007. Non-sovereign entities (the world, continents, and some dependent territories) and states with limited recognition (such as Kosovo, Palestine and Taiwan) are included in the list in cases in which they appear in the sources. These economies are not ranked in the charts here, but are listed in sequence by GDP for comparison. In addition, non-sovereign entities are marked in yellow.

=== Main table ===
The table is initially ranked by the average of the available estimates for each country or territory, and can be reranked by any of the sources. The links in the "Country/Territory" row of the following table link to the article on the GDP or the economy of the respective country or territory.

GDP (millions of current international dollar) by country or territory
Country or territory	IMF (2026) (Note: The following countries are from 2020–24 data: Afghanistan, Eritrea, Lebanon, Palestine, Sri Lanka, Syria.)	World Bank (2024–25) (Note: The following countries are from 2022 data: San Marino and U.S. Virgin Islands)	CIA (2023–24) (Note: The following countries are from 2020–2022 data: Congo, San Marino, and U.S. Virgin Islands.)
World	224,261,881	197,428,072	173,163,000
China (Note: IMF and CIA figures exclude Taiwan and the special administrative regions of Hong Kong and Macau.) (Note: World Bank figures exclude the special administrative regions of Hong Kong and Macau.)	44,554,951	41,259,863	33,598,000
United States	32,642,373	30,769,700	25,676,000
India	19,192,617	17,197,369	14,244,000
Russia	7,542,897	7,235,550	6,089,000
Japan	7,324,055	6,837,216	5,715,000
Germany	6,550,995	6,295,798	5,247,000
Indonesia	5,483,042	5,045,777	4,102,000
Brazil	5,266,506	4,986,894	4,165,000
United Kingdom	4,783,102	4,489,311	3,636,000
France	4,756,403	4,396,406	3,732,000
Turkey	4,025,804	3,889,308	3,018,000
Italy	3,898,990	3,700,051	3,133,000
South Korea	3,625,973	3,262,583	2,607,000
Mexico	3,594,397	3,413,265	2,883,000
Spain	3,001,678	2,954,778	2,361,000
Canada	2,915,715	2,780,073	2,341,000
Saudi Arabia	2,728,584	2,728,040	2,213,000
Egypt	2,600,028	2,391,468	1,958,000
Nigeria	2,438,180	2,264,022	1,318,000
Taiwan	2,406,687	—N/a	1,743,000
Poland	2,161,830	1,977,097	1,649,000
Australia	2,106,908	1,986,426	1,635,000
Vietnam	2,058,905	1,837,764	1,456,000
Thailand	1,983,943	1,880,026	1,558,000
Bangladesh	1,909,362	1,783,873	1,473,000
Pakistan	1,806,861	1,677,664	1,579,724
Iran	1,772,668	1,820,556	1,486,000
Malaysia	1,624,495	1,492,996	1,212,000
Netherlands	1,599,125	1,579,414	1,276,000
Argentina	1,577,460	1,494,141	1,213,000
Philippines	1,569,841	1,468,828	1,202,000
Colombia	1,262,046	1,209,578	978,592
Singapore	1,082,946	998,284	800,304
South Africa	1,075,434	1,029,850	870,420
Kazakhstan	996,311	923,242	739,385
Switzerland	975,753	932,096	741,035
United Arab Emirates	968,842	871,702	745,994
Algeria	947,065	881,645	722,912
Romania	942,929	968,038	774,376
Belgium	941,290	891,759	749,229
Sweden	844,411	768,561	668,628
Ireland	831,069	850,567	620,544
Chile	745,751	750,190	596,556
Austria	725,583	706,980	581,131
Ukraine (Note: Figures exclude the Republic of Crimea and Sevastopol.)	720,723	690,446	577,583
Peru	703,327	650,598	535,911
Czech Republic	692,166	658,517	521,928
Norway	657,258	562,975	507,680
Hong Kong	647,727	603,082	497,880
Israel	619,724	604,502	472,177
Iraq	606,636	670,835	585,887
Portugal	570,956	574,232	448,226
Uzbekistan	561,582	503,974	379,989
Ethiopia	561,348	490,635	380,895
Denmark	560,707	500,071	440,558
Greece	490,550	471,373	392,205
Hungary	486,618	474,167	389,207
Morocco (Note: Includes Western Sahara.)	472,789	433,708	350,594
Kenya	436,129	403,644	328,632
Angola	434,764	400,212	278,239
Sri Lanka	398,953	371,266	301,407
Finland	395,396	372,012	313,591
Dominican Republic	353,142	357,746	276,884
Qatar	331,217	383,067	317,064
Ghana	329,911	301,913	243,124
Belarus	325,565	315,429	265,220
Ecuador	325,302	306,477	252,728
Tanzania	322,693	305,597	246,706
New Zealand	313,675	305,373	257,117
Guatemala	305,119	284,001	232,673
Ivory Coast	294,178	244,407	215,018
Myanmar (Note: Referred to as "Burma".)	291,559	329,736	287,559
Bulgaria	284,116	285,967	219,645
Venezuela	282,366	—N/a	110,943
Azerbaijan	281,143	267,575	225,198
Slovakia	269,179	266,948	218,762
Oman	250,086	232,398	193,591
Kuwait	236,414	274,732	225,947
DR Congo	235,277	216,618	164,367
Serbia	228,475	222,079	177,093
Panama	217,782	200,685	164,484
Croatia	211,610	197,477	164,825
Uganda	206,676	179,214	144,137
Tunisia	198,912	188,111	156,086
Nepal	195,832	182,896	149,643
Costa Rica	185,286	174,245	138,371
Cameroon	184,290	172,937	143,264
Lithuania	177,443	164,191	136,227
Puerto Rico	171,634	166,234	141,344
Turkmenistan	164,780	172,197	134,555
Bolivia	162,373	161,966	122,200
Cambodia	160,111	152,469	123,676
Jordan	154,467	145,525	109,986
Paraguay	152,860	141,533	112,919
Zimbabwe	150,672	109,678	57,391
Libya	137,324	123,225	90,609
Uruguay	135,773	129,683	108,502
Sudan	133,237	113,257	94,420
Slovenia	132,894	126,249	103,118
Guinea	129,755	74,511	59,439
Georgia (Note: Excludes data for Abkhazia and South Ossetia.)	128,236	115,768	91,849
Syria	109,717	110,180	98,858
Senegal	109,634	103,429	83,183
Luxembourg	108,959	107,539	86,871
Zambia	104,733	95,966	79,207
Bahrain	104,204	113,620	93,937
Guyana	103,446	81,842	58,423
Afghanistan	101,020	95,368	82,238
Macau	100,333	93,989	77,524
El Salvador	96,940	89,761	73,961
Mali	95,793	88,265	71,253
Laos	95,090	81,745	66,905
Honduras	92,486	86,628	71,297
Latvia	85,532	85,250	72,516
Bosnia and Herzegovina	83,688	81,059	64,641
Cuba	—N/a	—N/a	81,165
Armenia	83,293	76,408	60,909
Mongolia	81,470	74,226	59,221
Burkina Faso	79,822	73,948	60,001
Benin	78,912	71,359	56,424
Kyrgyzstan	76,238	67,699	50,907
Estonia	73,391	71,200	57,001
Tajikistan	70,835	63,894	50,370
Lebanon	70,189	69,192	65,415
Nicaragua	69,819	65,057	52,989
Madagascar	68,658	63,925	52,968
Cyprus (Note: Data is for the area controlled by the Government of the Republic of Cyprus.)	67,972	63,713	50,056
Albania	67,609	66,307	51,360
Rwanda	67,324	60,673	46,543
Chad	66,904	60,968	52,895
Niger	66,767	60,784	47,921
Mozambique	63,380	60,500	51,786
Gabon	61,776	57,615	48,045
North Macedonia	57,790	51,037	43,844
Botswana	57,197	53,030	45,553
Trinidad and Tobago	52,888	50,773	43,362
Papua New Guinea	52,269	56,125	45,487
Moldova (Note: Excludes data for Transnistria.)	49,567	47,200	39,342
Malta	46,813	41,860	34,731
Brunei	45,554	43,102	36,640
Congo	45,476	47,002	19,030
Malawi	45,014	42,194	35,425
Mauritius	43,920	41,872	34,406
Mauritania	43,660	40,795	33,069
Namibia	39,091	37,069	31,154
Jamaica	38,991	37,708	29,130
Haiti	38,251	37,310	32,971
Togo	37,956	35,048	27,115
Sierra Leone	35,399	32,782	26,728
Somalia	34,464	32,288	26,770
Kosovo	34,408	30,375	25,019
Iceland	33,036	32,738	26,561
Equatorial Guinea	31,781	31,272	29,248
Yemen	30,433	—N/a	18,719
Palestine (Note: Referred to as "West Bank and Gaza" in the IMF and World Bank reports.) (Note: CIA registers 2 separate entries for Palestine: "West Bank" and "Gaza Strip". Figures for West Bank include the Gaza Strip -- see "The World Factbook - West Bank". CIA.gov. 29 November 2022. Archived from the original on 6 January 2021.)	23,153	27,066	20,339
Montenegro	22,833	22,072	17,375
Bahamas	19,691	16,556	14,544
South Sudan	19,674	—N/a	6,752
Eswatini	16,982	15,738	12,885
Bhutan	16,111	15,610	11,517
Fiji	16,005	15,245	13,100
Maldives	15,786	15,124	12,325
North Korea	—N/a	—N/a	15,416
Suriname	15,808	14,494	12,316
Burundi	15,443	17,959	11,739
Liberia	12,371	11,354	9,308
Central African Republic	12,365	7,243	5,926
Gambia	11,387	10,457	8,365
Djibouti	10,754	10,007	7,995
Monaco	—N/a	—N/a	8,924
Liechtenstein	8,284	—N/a	7,172
Lesotho	7,945	7,525	6,166
Bermuda	7,738	7,674	6,808
Barbados	7,699	7,318	5,634
Timor-Leste	7,548	6,822	5,863
Guinea-Bissau	7,239	7,407	5,912
Andorra	6,947	6,596	5,402
Cape Verde (Note: Referred to as "Cabo Verde".)	6,961	6,415	5,200
Belize	6,657	6,329	5,538
Eritrea	6,405	—N/a	2,534
Aruba	6,458	5,584	4,350
Cayman Islands	6,631	6,865	5,705
Saint Lucia	5,403	5,165	4,359
U.S. Virgin Islands	5,249	5,249	4,900
Curaçao	4,785	5,106	4,312
Seychelles	4,593	4,400	3,549
Greenland	4,483	4,486	4,040
Faroe Islands	4,255	4,485	3,834
Comoros	3,899	3,741	3,092
Antigua and Barbuda	3,506	3,375	2,772
San Marino	3,014	2,668	2,393
Grenada	2,721	2,503	2,080
Saint Vincent and the Grenadines	2,421	2,278	1,883
Sint Maarten (Dutch part)	2,258	2,481	1,986
Solomon Islands	2,218	2,337	2,070
Samoa	1,853	2,043	1,503
Saint Kitts and Nevis	1,816	1,725	1,465
Turks and Caicos Islands	—N/a	1,766	1,554
São Tomé and Príncipe	1,593	1,534	1,291
Dominica	1,564	1,496	1,241
Vanuatu	1,416	1,516	1,039
Tonga	855	899	740
Kiribati	517	537	438
Federated States of Micronesia	491	523	433
Palau	365	407	280
Marshall Islands	297	325	271
Nauru	151	170	151
Tuvalu	71	64	57

== GDP (PPP) milestones by countries ==
The following is a list of countries reaching a certain threshold of GDP (PPP) in a specific year according to International Monetary Fund. As for the Soviet Union, its GDP (PPP) reached US$2.66 trillion in 1990, but it is unknown in which year did its economy surpass the 1 trillion and 2 trillion hallmark.

=== 1–6 trillion ===
1 trillion USD		2 trillion USD		3 trillion USD		5 trillion USD		6 trillion USD	
Year	Country	Year	Country	Year	Country	Year	Country	Year	Country
1969	United States	1977	United States	1981	United States	1988	United States	1991	United States
bef 1990	Soviet Union	bef 1990	Soviet Union	1996	Japan	2004	China	2006	China
1980	Japan	1988	Japan	1999	China	2011	India	2014	India
1981	West Germany	1993	Germany	2005	India	2015	Japan	2022	Japan
1987	Italy	1995	China	2005	Germany	2021	Russia	2022	Russia
1989	France	2001	India	2008	Russia	2021	Germany	2025	Germany
1989	United Kingdom	2004	Russia	2014	Brazil	2025	Indonesia	2028	Indonesia*
1991	China	2004	Italy	2017	United Kingdom	2026	Brazil*	2030	Brazil*
N/A	Russia	2004	France	2018	France	2028	United Kingdom*		
1992	India	2005	United Kingdom	2018	Indonesia	2028	France*		
1993	Brazil	2006	Brazil	2022	Italy	2030	Turkey*		
1994	Mexico	2011	Mexico	2022	Turkey				
2000	Spain	2012	Indonesia	2023	Mexico				
2002	Canada	2015	South Korea	2023	South Korea				
2003	Indonesia	2016	Turkey	2027	Spain*				
2003	South Korea	2019	Spain	2027	Saudi Arabia*				
2005	Turkey	2021	Canada	2027	Canada*				
2008	Saudi Arabia	2022	Saudi Arabia	2029	Egypt*				
2010	Iran	2023	Egypt	2030	Nigeria*				
2010	Nigeria	2024	Nigeria						
2012	Thailand	2025	Taiwan						
2012	Australia	2025	Poland						
2014	Taiwan	2025	Australia						
2015	Egypt	2026	Pakistan						
2015	Poland	2026	Vietnam						
2015	Argentina	2027	Thailand*						
2016	Pakistan	2027	Bangladesh*						
2018	Netherlands	2029	Iran*						
2019	Vietnam	2030	Philippines*						
2020	Bangladesh	2030	Malaysia*						
2021	Malaysia	2031	Argentina*						
2021	Philippines								
2022	Colombia								
2025	South Africa								
2026	Singapore*								
2026	United Arab Emirates*								
2027	Kazakhstan*								
2028	Romania*								
2028	Algeria*								
2028	Switzerland*								
2029	Belgium*								
2029	Ireland*								

* Future predictions are marked with an asterisk.

=== 10–50 trillion ===
10 trillion USD		20 trillion USD		30 trillion USD		40 trillion USD		50 trillion USD	
Year	Country	Year	Country	Year	Country	Year	Country	Year	Country
2000	United States	2017	China	2022	China	2025	China	2029	China*
2009	China	2018	United States	2025	United States				
2021	India	2027	India*						

=== Other territories ===
GDP (millions of current international dollar) by territory
Territory	CIA	
Territory	Estimate	Year
New Caledonia	8,469	2024
Isle of Man	6,792	2015
French Polynesia	6,007	2024
Guam	5,793	2016
Jersey	5,569	2016
Guernsey	3,465	2015
Gibraltar	2,044	2014
British Virgin Islands	1,634	2024
Northern Mariana Islands	1,242	2016
American Samoa	658	2016
Saint Martin (French part)	562	2005
Cook Islands	401	2024
Anguilla	362	2024
Saint Pierre and Miquelon	261	2015
Falkland Islands	206	2015
Montserrat	89	2024
Wallis and Futuna	60	2004
Saint Helena, Ascension and Tristan da Cunha	31	2009
Niue	19	2021
Tokelau	8	2017

== GDP (PPP) of regional groupings ==
In addition to the national GDP values stated in the previous section, the IMF statistics include GDP estmates for various regional grouping and trade blocks. The table below provides a list of these groupings, these being IMF regions.

GDP forecast or estimate (million US$) by region or grouping
Regional groupings	IMF (2026)	Ref.
World	224,261,881	
Emerging Market and Developing Economies (Note: The IMF category for Emerging Markets and Developing Economies include the following states: Afghanistan, Albania, Algeria, Angola, Antigua and Barbuda, Argentina, Armenia, Aruba, Azerbaijan, The Bahamas, Bahrain, Bangladesh, Barbados, Belarus, Belize, Benin, Bhutan, Bolivia, Bosnia and Herzegovina, Botswana, Brazil, Brunei Darussalam, Bulgaria, Burkina Faso, Burundi, Cape Verde, Cambodia, Cameroon, Central African Republic, Chad, Chile, China, Colombia, Comoros, Democratic Republic of the Congo, Republic of Congo, Costa Rica, Côte d'Ivoire, Djibouti, Dominica, Dominican Republic, Ecuador, Egypt, El Salvador, Equatorial Guinea, Eritrea, Eswatini, Ethiopia, Fiji, Gabon, The Gambia, Georgia, Ghana, Grenada, Guatemala, Guinea, Guinea-Bissau, Guyana, Haiti, Honduras, Hungary, India, Indonesia, Iran, Iraq, Jamaica, Jordan, Kazakhstan, Kenya, Kiribati, Kosovo, Kuwait, Kyrgyzstan, Lao P.D.R., Lebanon, Lesotho, Liberia, Libya, Madagascar, Malawi, Malaysia, Maldives, Mali, Marshall Islands, Mauritania, Mauritius, Mexico, Micronesia, Moldova, Mongolia, Montenegro, Morocco, Mozambique, Myanmar, Namibia, Nauru, Nepal, Nicaragua, Niger, Nigeria, North Macedonia, Oman, Pakistan, Palau, Panama, Papua New Guinea, Paraguay, Peru, Philippines, Poland, Qatar, Romania, Russia, Rwanda, Samoa, São Tomé and Príncipe, Saudi Arabia, Senegal, Serbia, Seychelles, Sierra Leone, Solomon Islands, Somalia, South Africa, South Sudan, Sri Lanka, St. Kitts and Nevis, St. Lucia, St. Vincent and the Grenadines, Sudan, Suriname, Syria, Tajikistan, Tanzania, Thailand, Timor-Leste, Togo, Tonga, Trinidad and Tobago, Tunisia, Türkiye, Turkmenistan, Tuvalu, Uganda, Ukraine, United Arab Emirates, Uruguay, Uzbekistan, Vanuatu, Venezuela, Vietnam, Palestine, Yemen, Zambia, Zimbabwe)	136,519,509	
Advanced Economies/High Income (Note: The IMF category for Advanced Economies includes the following states: Andorra, Australia, Austria, Belgium, Canada, Croatia, Cyprus, Czech Republic, Denmark, Estonia, Finland, France, Germany, Greece, Hong Kong SAR, Iceland, Ireland, Israel, Italy, Japan, Korea, Latvia, Lithuania, Luxembourg, Macao SAR, Malta, The Netherlands, New Zealand, Norway, Portugal, Puerto Rico, San Marino, Singapore, Slovak Republic, Slovenia, Spain, Sweden, Switzerland, Taiwan Province of China, United Kingdom, United States)	87,742,372	(Note: The World Bank High Income category includes: American Samoa, Andorra, Antigua and Barbuda, Aruba, Australia, Austria, Bahamas, The, Bahrain, Barbados, Belgium, Bermuda, British Virgin Islands, Brunei Darussalam, Bulgaria, Canada, Cayman Islands, Channel Islands, Chile, Costa Rica, Croatia, Curacao, Cyprus, Czechia, Denmark, Estonia, Faroe Islands, Finland, France, French Polynesia, Germany, Gibraltar, Greece, Greenland, Guam, Guyana, Hong Kong SAR, China, Hungary, Iceland, Ireland, Isle of Man, Israel, Italy, Japan, Korea, Rep., Kuwait, Latvia, Liechtenstein, Lithuania, Luxembourg, Macao SAR, China, Malta, Monaco, Nauru, Netherlands, New Caledonia, New Zealand, Northern Mariana Islands, Norway, Oman, Palau, Panama, Poland, Portugal, Puerto Rico (US), Qatar, Romania, Russian Federation, San Marino, Saudi Arabia, Seychelles, Singapore, Sint Maarten (Dutch part), Slovak Republic, Slovenia, Spain, St. Kitts and Nevis, St. Martin (French part), Sweden, Switzerland, Trinidad and Tobago, Turks and Caicos Islands, United Arab Emirates, United Kingdom, United States, Uruguay, Virgin Islands (U.S.))
Emerging and Developing Asia (Note: The IMF definition for Emerging and Developing Asia includes these states: Bangladesh, Bhutan, Brunei Darussalam, Cambodia, China, Fiji, India, Indonesia, Kiribati, Lao P.D.R., Malaysia, Maldives, Marshall Islands, Micronesia, Mongolia, Myanmar, Nauru, Nepal, Palau, Papua New Guinea, Philippines, Samoa, Solomon Islands, Sri Lanka, Thailand, Timor-Leste, Tonga, Tuvalu, Vanuatu, Vietnam)	79,761,677	(Note: The World Bank category of 'East Asia and Pacific (excluding high income)' includes: Cambodia, China, Fiji, Indonesia, Kiribati, Korea, Dem. People's Rep., Lao PDR, Malaysia, Marshall Islands, Micronesia, Fed. Sts., Mongolia, Myanmar, Papua New Guinea, Philippines, Samoa, Solomon Islands, Thailand, Timor-Leste, Tonga, Tuvalu, Vanuatu, Viet Nam)
G7 (Note: The G7 group of countries includes: Canada, France, Germany, Italy, Japan, United Kingdom, United States)	62,871,633	
European Union	30,928,605	
Emerging and Developing Europe (Note: The IMF category for Emerging and Developing Europe includes these states: Albania, Belarus, Bosnia and Herzegovina, Bulgaria, Hungary, Kosovo, Moldova, Montenegro, North Macedonia, Poland, Romania, Russia, Serbia, Türkiye, Ukraine)	16,770,735	
Middle East and Central Asia (Note: The IMF category for Middle East and Central Asia includes these states: Afghanistan, Algeria, Armenia, Azerbaijan, Bahrain, Djibouti, Egypt, Georgia, Iran, Iraq, Jordan, Kazakhstan, Kuwait, Kyrgyzstan, Lebanon, Libya, Mauritania, Morocco, Oman, Pakistan, Qatar, Saudi Arabia, Somalia, Sudan, Syria, Tajikistan, Tunisia, Turkmenistan, United Arab Emirates, Uzbekistan, Palestine, Yemen)	16,026,391	
Latin America & Caribbean	15,840,658	
Other Advanced Economies (Note: The IMF category for Other Advanced Economies includes these states: Andorra, Australia, Czech Republic, Denmark, Hong Kong SAR, Iceland, Israel, Korea, Macao SAR, New Zealand, Norway, Puerto Rico, San Marino, Singapore, Sweden, Switzerland, Taiwan Province of China)	14,857,182	
ASEAN-5 (Note: The IMF category for ASEAN-5 includes these states: Indonesia, Malaysia, Philippines, Singapore, Thailand)	11,744,268	
Sub-Saharan Africa	8,120,047	

== See also ==
- Lists of countries by GDP
- List of countries by GDP (PPP) per capita
- List of countries by GDP (nominal)
- List of countries by GDP (nominal) per capita
- List of countries by past and projected GDP (nominal)
- List of countries by past and projected GDP (PPP)
- List of countries by real GDP growth rate
- List of first-level administrative divisions by GRDP
- List of countries by total wealth
- List of sovereign states by wealth inequality
- List of countries by income equality
- List of countries by Human Development Index
- Median income
