= Economy of Réunion =

The economy of Réunion has traditionally been based on agriculture. Sugarcane has been the primary crop for more than a century, and in some years it accounts for 85% of exports. The government has been pushing the development of a tourist industry to relieve high unemployment, which amounts to more than 40% of the labour force.

The gap in Réunion between the well-off and the poor is large and accounts for persistent social tensions. The outbreak of severe rioting in February 1991 illustrated the seriousness of socio-economic tensions.

In 2007 the GDP per capita of Réunion at nominal exchange rates, not at PPP, was €17,146 (US$23,501). However, while this is exceptionally high compared with its neighbours in Madagascar and the African continent, it is only 57% of the 30,140 euros per capita GDP of metropolitan France in 2007. Reunion Island is one of the French departments with the highest poverty rate with 42% of the population living below the poverty line. The total GDP of the island was US$18.8 billion in 2007.

== Other export products ==
- Essential oil (mainly vetyver and rose scent geranium)
- Bourbon vanilla
- Fish & seafood, mainly tuna, swordfish and Patagonian toothfish

== Statistics ==
- Currency: 1 euro (sign: €; code: EUR) = 100 Cent
- Exchange rates: See: Euro exchange rate
- Fiscal year: calendar year

== See also ==
- Economy of France in: French Guiana, French Polynesia, Guadeloupe, Martinique, Mayotte, New Caledonia, Réunion, Saint Barthélemy, Saint Martin, Saint Pierre and Miquelon, Wallis and Futuna
- Taxation in France
- Economic history of France
- Poverty in France
