= Economy of Saint Martin (island) =

- Currency: Euro (EUR) in French part; Netherlands Antillean guilder (ANG) in Dutch part; US dollar available in both side
- Fiscal year: calendar year
- Trade organisations: Windward Islands Federation of Labour
- Country group: Developed/Advanced; High-income economy

Statistics
- Population: 38,247 Dutch side - 36,992 French side
- GDP: $1.394 billion ($794.7 million Sint Maarten/$599 million Saint Martin) (2008 est, nominal)
- GDP growth: 1.6% (2008 est.)
- GDP per capita: $15,400 (2008 est.)
- GDP by sector: agriculture: 1%; industry: 15%; services: 84% (2009 est.)
- Inflation (CPI): 1.2% (June 2015)
- Labour force: ~45,000 (23,200 in St. Maarten)'08
- Labour force by occupation: agriculture: 1.2%; industry: 16.9; services: 83.7% (2006)
- Unemployment: 11.5% (Census 2011 Labour & Income)
- Main industries: tourism, light industry, heavy industry

External
- Export goods: sugar
- Main export partners: China 23.49% United States 10.91% Japan 5.92% (2009 est.)
- Import goods: foods, manufactured goods,
- Main import partners: China 17.35% Japan 14.79% United States 8.96% Saudi Arabia 6.89% (2009 est.)
- All values, unless otherwise stated, are in US dollars.

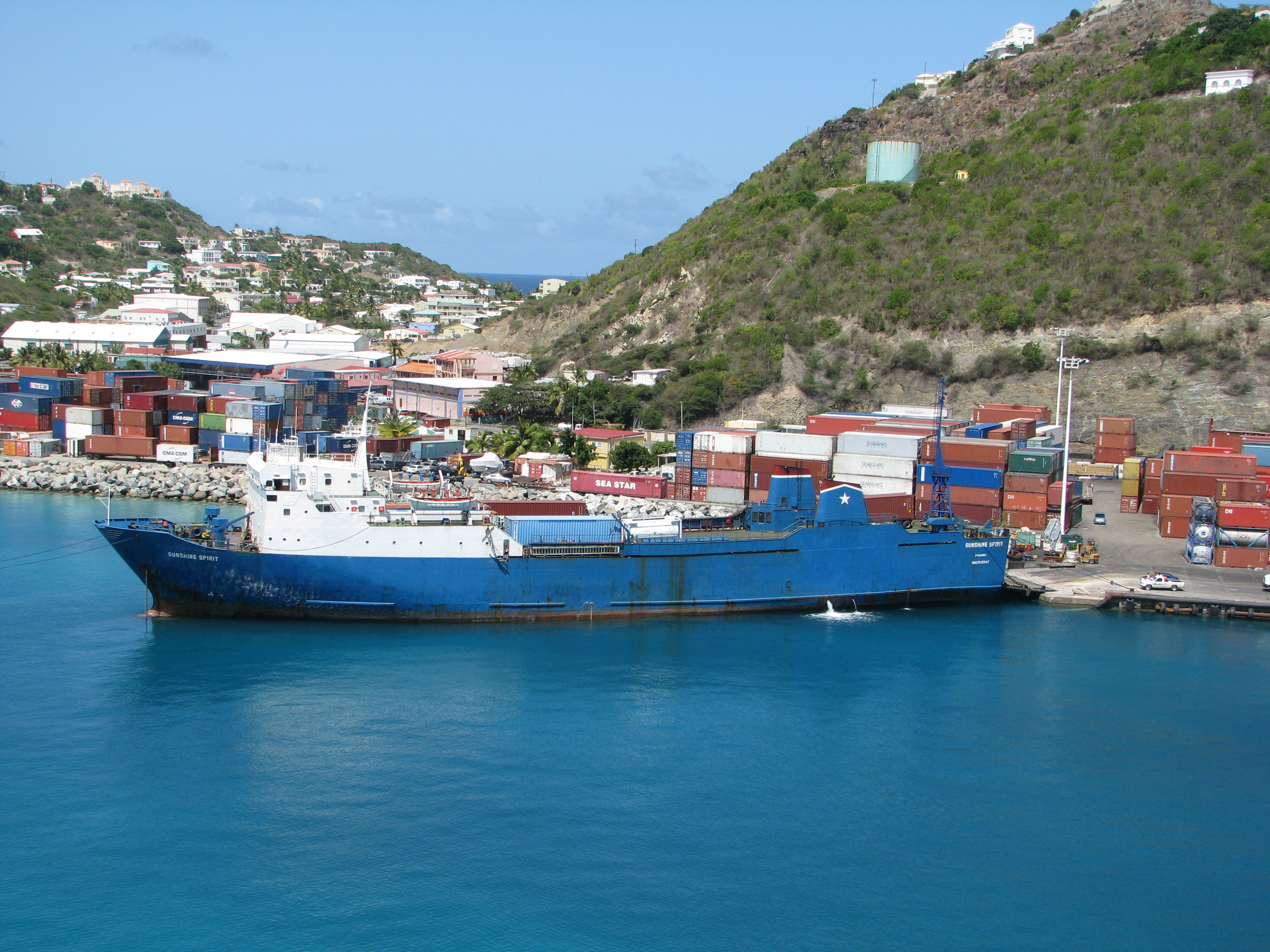
Container ship Sunshine Spirit in Philipsburg, Sint Maarten

The economy of Saint Martin, divided between the French Collectivity of Saint Martin (north side) and the Dutch Sint Maarten (south side), is predominately dependent on tourism. For more than two centuries, the main commodity exports have generally been salt and locally grown commodities, like sugar.

Until the island was affected by Hurricane Irma in 2017 and the COVID-19 pandemic in 2020, which put a stop to cruising, tourism accounted for 80% of the economy and about four-fifths of the labor force was engaged in that sector. As an island in the Caribbean Sea, Saint Martin enjoys the kind of weather and natural geography that supports tourism. Its proximity to the rest of the Caribbean has also provided economic benefits with its largest airport, Princess Juliana International Airport on the Dutch Sint Maarten side, serving as the main gateway to the Leeward Islands. The larger post-Panamax cruise ships made regular stops to the island. The island offers duty-free shopping and there are few business restrictions to hinder growth. Though the French and Dutch parts differ slightly in terms of their economies and types of tourists, they share the Caribbean's largest lagoon, which is frequented by yachts.

In 2013, nearly 1.8 million visitors came to the island by cruise ship and roughly 500,000 visitors arrived through Princess Juliana International Airport. Cruise ships and yachts also call on Saint Martin's numerous ports and harbors. Limited agriculture and local fishing means that almost all food must be imported. Energy resources and manufactured goods are also imported. The Dutch part of the island has the highest per capita income among the five islands that formerly comprised the Netherlands Antilles.

== Hurricane Irma (2017) ==
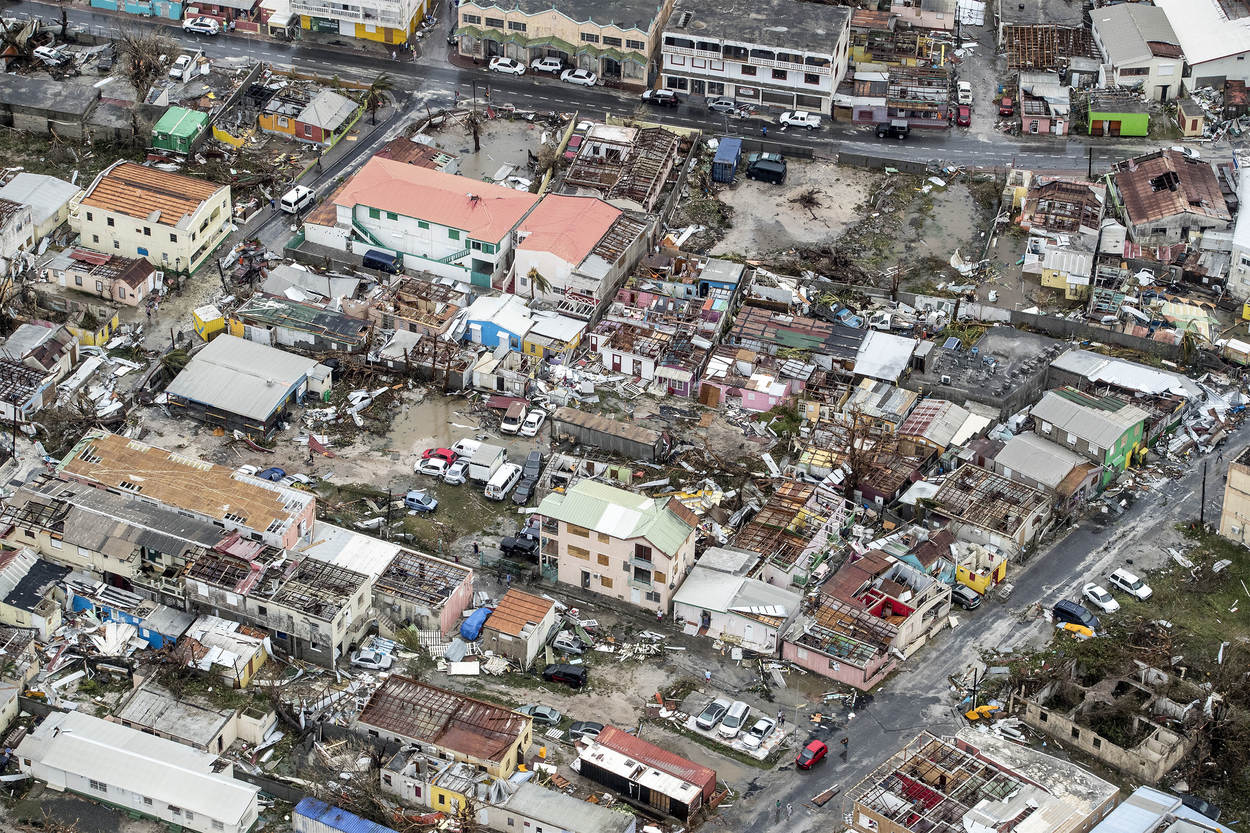
Extensive damage to buildings in Sint Maarten on 7 September 2017, hours after Hurricane Irma made landfall on the island

On 6 September 2017 the island was hit by Hurricane Irma (Category 5 at landfall), which caused widespread and significant damage, estimated at $3 billion, to buildings and infrastructure. A total of 11 deaths had been reported as of 9 July 2018. France's Minister of the Interior, Gérard Collomb, said on 8 September 2017 that most of the schools were destroyed on the French half of the island. In addition to damage caused by high winds, there were reports of serious flood damage to businesses in the village of Marigot. The Washington Post reported that 95% of the structures on the French side and 75% of the structures on the Dutch side were damaged or destroyed.

Some days after the storm had abated, a survey by the Dutch Red Cross estimated that nearly a third of the buildings in Sint Maarten had been destroyed and that over 90% of structures on the island had been damaged. Princess Juliana Airport was extensively damaged but reopened on a partial basis in two days to allow incoming relief flights and for flights that would take evacuees to other islands. By March 2018 much of the territory's infrastructure was back up and running.

== History ==
In the 1630s just after colonization by the Dutch, the Dutch West India Company started major salt mining operations on the island which in turn made the island more attractive to the Spanish (who wanted to control the salt trade, a fifteen-year war ensued). When the Spanish left in 1648, the Dutch and the French re-established their presence. By the late 17th century cotton, tobacco and sugar were cultivated on the island.

Until the 1950s, the economic activity of the island is based on two main activities, agriculture (sugar) and the exploitation of salt.

At the beginning of the 20th century, Saint Martin went through an economic slump because the salt works only provided a living for a limited population and the work was seasonal. The poorer segments of the population migrated to work on neighbouring islands.

The Second World War took the island out of its isolation. In 1939, the island became duty-free, making transactions inexpensive. During and after the war, the trade with the USA intensified to the point that they became the sole provider of the island because of the blockade of the Allied Forces. This period was prosperous for many traders of merchandise such as cigarettes, fabrics, and food.

When peace returned, the island took advantage of an American tourism market attracted by the Caribbean climate and environment. From 1950 to 1970, the hotel development was mainly in the Dutch part. Then, tax exemption laws allowed a real estate boom on the French side.

The main commercial centers are Philipsburg and Simpson Bay on Dutch/South side and Marigot and Grand Case on the French/North side of the island.

== Currencies ==
The official currency and legal tender in the Collectivity of Saint Martin (French north) is the euro which replaced the French franc in 2002. Saint Martin is part of the eurozone, and is part of the European Union. It is outside the Schengen Area and the EU VAT Area.

In Sint Maarten (Dutch south), the Netherlands Antillean guilder (ANG) has been the official currency since 1940 until 2025, when it was replaced by the Caribbean Guilder (XCG). It is pegged to the United States dollar. Sint Maarten is not part of the EU or Eurozone.

The US dollar is also commonly used on both sides of the island.

== Tourism ==
Both sides of the island largely depend on tourism, but the French part of the island is falling behind economically, as the main airport, casinos and facilities for larger cruise ships are located on the Dutch part of the island. St. Maarten is a major destination for large cruise ships in the Caribbean.

Most tourists come from the United States, which makes the island highly exposed to the US economic business cycle. In addition, its potential growth level is low, as it is hard to reach substantial productivity gains in the services sector. Tourism has been hit hard by Hurricane Irma in 2017 which destroyed most of the island’s infrastructure, and was slowly recovering when the COVID-19 pandemic in 2020 put a stop, at least temporarily, to cruising as well as other tourism. By 2024, tourism capacity had eclipsed pre-Irma and pre-pandemic levels - partially due to a surge in construction of independent vacation rental complexes.

The Dutch south is known for its casinos, exotic drinks, jewelry and nightlife, while the French north is better known for its beaches, shopping and restaurants. It is known for having the best food culture in the Caribbean.

On island there are 37 beaches, while in the French north topless sunbathing is permitted and Orient Bay has a clothing optional beach. At the border between the French and Dutch territories is the Caribbean's largest lagoon, Simpson Bay, which attracts tourists with yachts.

=== Cruise tourism & Yachting ===
During the 2014/2015 cruise season, cruise tourism generated nearly $US423 million in direct income. For the entire 2014/2015 cruise year, the estimated 1.85 million cruise passengers who visited St. Maarten spent a total of $US354.7 million and the estimated 377,390 crew who visited St. Maarten spent an estimated total of $US45.0 million.

Cruise tourism in St. Maarten generated direct employment for 4,897 residents who earned $101.6 million in annual wages. Adding the indirect contribution that results from the spending of those local businesses that are the direct recipients of passenger, crew and cruise line expenditures, the direct cruise tourism generated a total employment contribution of 9,259 jobs and $189.1 million in wage income in St. Maarten during the 2014/2015 cruise year.

This analyses called “Economic contribution of tourism to the destination economies” of cruise-related spending and its impact on the economies of the participating destinations was conducted by the Business Research and Economic Advisors (BREA) on behalf of the Florida-Caribbean Cruise Association (FCCA) and participating cruise destinations an analysis.

The Port St. Maarten Group of Companies reported that the Y2Y comparison (2014-2015) shows that a 5% decline in cruise passengers visiting St. Maarten in 2015.

According to the St. Maarten’s Government Department of Statistics, cruise ship arrivals in the first quarter of 2016 was down 15.2%.

Cruise tourism recovered relatively well in the wake of hurricane Irma in 2017. In 2019, over 1.6 million cruise visitors were welcomed. Recovery in the wake of the global pandemic was more difficult. 2026 will be the first year the post-pandemic cruise visit count will surpass the 1.6 million threshold once more, with a start of five five cruise ship days in both January and February. This amount is still under the 2014 count of over 2 million.

Yachting is an important third economic pillar. A 2024 study showed yachting, marinas, provisioning, chandlery, repairs and all related activities make up 16.3% of the Dutch side GDP.

=== Airport ===
The Princess Juliana International Airport, which is located on the Dutch/South side of the island, is the main gateway by air to St. Maarten and other Leeward Islands. The airport is called 'SXM Airport' for short, handled 1,795,117 passengers in 2014.

In 2014, SXM Airport and its users account for a total impact of 60% of St. Maarten’s GDP, 32.8% of GDP of the balance of payments/net, 7.5% of GDP of government revenues, 52.0% of total employment.

In 2014, the airport itself has Revenues of 106,954,353 ANG (USD 59,751,353) and Net Income 8,737,639 ANG (USD 4,881,362). It employed 268 people.

== Imports ==
Saint Martin is dependent on imports, and is especially vulnerable to price fluctuations of both oil and foodstuffs.

== Companies ==
Winair (Windward Island Airways), a major regional airline in the Caribbean, is headquartered in Sint Maarten.

The entire island has over 300 restaurants and is considered an economic center for the NE Caribbean.

Because of the Concordia Agreement (1648) and policies implemented by the Dutch in the 1980s, there is very little in the way of business restrictions.

== Taxes ==
The St. Maarten (Dutch/South) tax system consists of taxes on corporations and taxes on individuals. For tax purposes, corporations are classified as either resident or non-resident. The taxes on corporations are the income tax (Wet inkomstenbelasting 2001), profits tax (winstbelasting), dividend tax (Wet op de dividendbelasting 1965 The turnover tax (BBO) is levied on the delivery of goods and all services rendered ‘within the territory’ by resident or non-resident entrepreneurs within the scope of their business. The BBO rate is 5%. One of the taxes on individuals is payroll tax (loonbelasting). A 5% room tax (logeergastenbelasting) is levied from non-resident guests of hotels and other guesthouses, including rentals of vacation villa's and condos. Time-share guests pay a fixed fee of NAF 90 (USD 50) per week which is included in the annual maintenance fee. Gasoline and cigarettes are subject to an excise duty. A transfer tax (overdrachtsbelasting) of 4% is levied on the transfer of real estate. Furthermore, there is a Real Estate Property tax (grondbelasting). This annual tax is levied on the value of the real estate. The tax rate amounts to 0,3% of the value of both unimproved property and improved land with structure, and is charged to the owner of the properties. A person who inherits money or property on the estate of a person who has died has to pay inheritance tax (successiebelasting).

The Collectivité St. Martin (French/North) tax environment The Collectivité is not authorized to vote in tax rules that are retroactive. Possibility for companies to obtain an official ruling (prise de position officielle) regarding their situation, which guarantees that the tax system applied to them will not be changed in the future. Existence of extensive jurisprudence rendered over a period of several decades by the French justice system, and which is nearly always transferable locally since local tax rules are, for the most part, based on concepts and definitions that are identical to those prescribed by tax laws in France. Company income tax: The tax base that is limited to profits made in Saint-Martin. Almost total exemption for dividends and capital gains on the sale of shareholdings. Rates of taxation: 10% or 20%. Carry-forward of losses that is unlimited in time and amount. A 10% tax rate for revenue from industrial property rights (patents, trademarks) and copyrights, as well as rights for the production of objects using 3D printing technology. A 10% tax rate for revenue from securities giving access to capital (convertible bonds, bonds with warrants). Tax-Free repatriation of profits: Absence of any withholding tax for payments to beneficiaries resident outside Saint-Martin, on dividends, interest, or royalties. Tax concessions for investment: “Tax exemption” scheme equivalent to a “tax holiday” system (exemption from corporate tax so long as the aggregate amount of taxable income is less than the amount of productive investments made). Exemption from property tax for five years for new commercial premises. Reduced transfer tax on the acquisition of land for the purposes of priority activities. No tax on imports: Apart from a specific tax on petrol products, there is no duty charged on the introduction of goods into Collectivité territory. Similarly, the TGCA tax (an indirect tax similar in some ways to VAT) is not levied on the imports of goods.

== Debt ==
On November 2, 2006, the Dutch government set aside 65 million guilders (NAF) to pay off St. Maarten's debts. The Dutch portion of the island became a country within the Kingdom of the Netherlands in 2010. While this was beneficial in some ways, the decision has shifted more responsibilities over to the island and with those, more debt. Since St. Maarten became an autonomous country in 2010, it has never had a balanced budget and it has accumulated a debt of 200 million guilders (NAF) according to a statement by the Minister of Finance in December 2015.

== See also ==
- Caribbean guilder
- Central Bank of Curaçao and Sint Maarten
- Central banks and currencies of the Caribbean
- Collectivity of Saint Martin
- Dutch Caribbean Securities Exchange
- Economy of the Caribbean
- Economic history of France
- Economy of France in: French Guiana, French Polynesia, Guadeloupe, Martinique, Mayotte, New Caledonia, Réunion, Saint Barthélemy, Saint Martin, Saint Pierre and Miquelon, Wallis and Futuna
- Taxation in France
- Poverty in France
- List of Latin American and Caribbean countries by GDP growth
- List of Latin American and Caribbean countries by GDP (nominal)
- List of Latin American and Caribbean countries by GDP (PPP)
- List of countries by credit rating
- List of countries by tax revenue as percentage of GDP
- List of countries by future gross government debt
- List of countries by leading trade partners
