= Economy of Mayotte =

- Currency: 1 euro (currency sign: €; banking code: EUR) = 100 cent
- Fixed exchange rates: euros per US dollar - 0.8041 (2005), 0.8054 (2004), 0.886 (2003), 1.0626 (2002), 1.1175 (2001)
- Fiscal year: calendar year

Statistics
- GDP: US$547 million (in 2001)
- GDP per capita: US$3,550 (in 2001)
- GDP by sector: agriculture: NA%; industry: NA%; services: NA%
- Population below poverty line: NA%
- Labour force: 48,800 (2000)
- Unemployment: 38% (1999)
- Main industries: newly created lobster and shrimp industry, construction

External
- Exports: $3.44 million f.o.b. (1997)
- Export goods: ylang-ylang (perfume essence), vanilla, copra, coconuts, coffee, cinnamon
- Main export partners: France 80%, Comoros 15%, Reunion (2004)
- Imports: $141.3 million f.o.b. (1997)
- Import goods: food, machinery and equipment, transportation equipment, metals, chemicals
- Main import partners: France 66%, Africa 14%, Southeast Asia 11% (2004)
- Gross external debt: $NA

Public finances
- Revenues: $NA
- Expenses: $73 million; including capital expenditures of $NA (1991 est.)
- Economic aid: recipient: $107.7 million; note - extensive French financial assistance (1995)
- All values, unless otherwise stated, are in US dollars.

The economy of Mayotte is based primarily on the agricultural sector, including fishing and livestock raising. The island of Mayotte is not self-sufficient and must import a large portion of its food requirements, mainly from Metropolitan France. The economy and future development of the island are heavily dependent on French financial assistance, an important supplement to GDP. Mayotte's remote location is an obstacle to the development of tourism.

== See also ==
- Economy of France in: French Guiana, French Polynesia, Guadeloupe, Martinique, Mayotte, New Caledonia, Réunion, Saint Barthélemy, Saint Martin, Saint Pierre and Miquelon, Wallis and Futuna
- Taxation in France
- Economic history of France
- Poverty in France
