= Economy of French Guiana =

Statistics
- GDP: US$4.93 billion (in 2019)
- GDP growth: 6.4% (in 2006)
- GDP per capita: US$17,336 (in 2006)
- Inflation (CPI): 1% (2002)
- Labour force: 58.800 (1997)
- Labour force by occupation: services, government, and commerce 60,6%, industry 21,2%, agriculture 18,2% (1980)
- Unemployment: 19,2% (2001 est.)
- Main industries: construction, space exploration, shrimp processing, forestry products, rum, gold mining

External
- Exports: US$1,501 million (in 2006)
- Export goods: satellites, shrimp, timber, gold, rum, rosewood essence, clothing
- Main export partners: France 62%, Switzerland 7%, United States 2% (2004)
- Imports: US$1,693 million (in 2006)
- Import goods: food (grains, processed meat), machinery and transport equipment, fuels and chemicals
- Main import partners: France 63%, United States, Trinidad and Tobago, Italy (2004)
- Gross external debt: $800,3 million (1988)
- All values, unless otherwise stated, are in US dollars.

The economy of French Guiana is tied closely to that of mainland France through subsidies and imports. Besides the French space center at Kourou, fishing and forestry are the most important economic activities in French Guiana. The large reserves of tropical hardwoods, not fully exploited, support an expanding sawmill industry which provides saw logs for export. Cultivation of crops is limited to the coastal area, where the population is largely concentrated; rice and manioc are the major crops. French Guiana is heavily dependent on imports of food and energy. Unemployment is a serious problem, particularly among younger workers.

Budget:
revenues: $135,5 million
expenditures: $135,5 million, including capital expenditures of $105 million (1996)

Electricity - production: 465,2 GWh (2003)

Electricity - production by source:
fossil fuel: 100%
hydro: 0%
nuclear: 0%
other: 0% (1998)

Electricity - consumption: 432,6 GWh (2003)

Electricity - exports: 0 kWh (2003)

Electricity - imports: 0 kWh (2003)

A combined power plant with 55 MW solar, 3 MW hydrogen fuel cell, 20MW/38MWh battery and 16 MW hydrogen electrolyser with 88MWh storage began construction in 2021.

Agriculture - products: rice, manioc (tapioca), sugar, cocoa, vegetables, bananas; cattle, pigs, poultry

Currency: Euro

Fiscal year: calendar year

== See also ==
- Economy of France in: French Guiana, French Polynesia, Guadeloupe, Martinique, Mayotte, New Caledonia, Réunion, Saint Barthélemy, Saint Martin, Saint Pierre and Miquelon, Wallis and Futuna
- Montagne d'Or mine
- Taxation in France
- Economic history of France
- Poverty in France

Media related to Economy of French Guiana at Wikimedia Commons
