= Economy of French Polynesia =

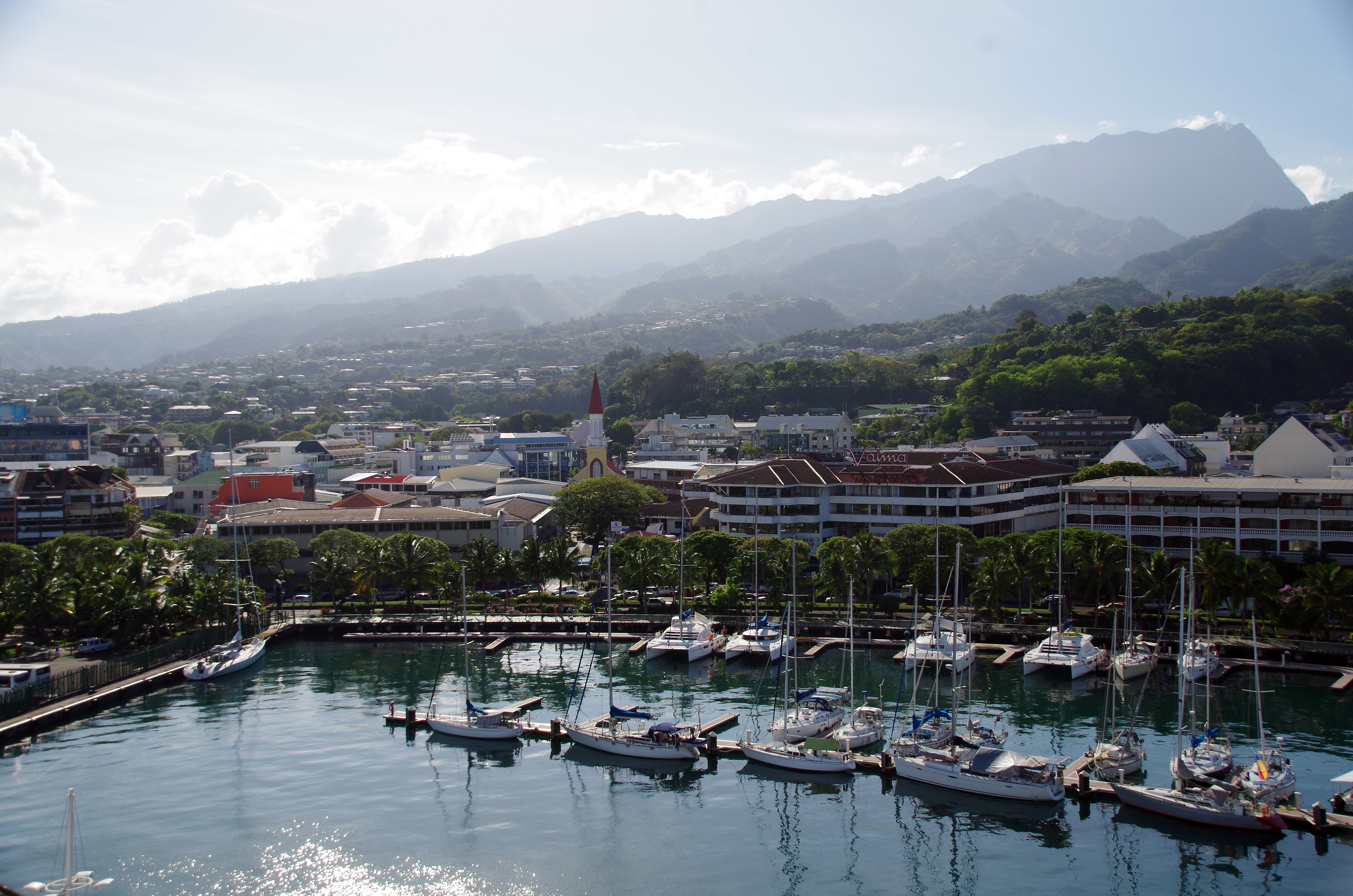
- Pape'ete's central business district is French Polynesia's largest financial and business services hub.
- Currency: CFP franc (₣)
- Fiscal year: calendar year

Statistics
- GDP: $5.49 billion (2015 est.)
- GDP rank: 176
- GDP growth: 2% (2015 est.)
- GDP per capita: $17,000 (2015 est.)
- GDP per capita rank: 104
- GDP by sector: agriculture: 2.5%; industry: 13%; services: 84.5% (2009)
- Inflation (CPI): 0% (2015 est.)
- Population below national poverty line: 19.7% (2009 est.)
- Labour force: 126,300 (2016 est.)
- Labour force by occupation: agriculture: 13%; industry: 19%; services: 68% (2013 est.)
- Unemployment: 21.8% (2012)
- Main industries: tourism, pearls, agricultural processing, handicrafts, phosphates

External
- Exports: $1.245 billion (2014 est.)
- Export goods: cultured pearls, coconut products, mother-of-pearl, vanilla, shark meat
- Main export partners: Japan 23.1%; Hong Kong 21.5%; Kyrgyzstan 15.9%; United States 15.9%; France 12.4%; (2017)
- Imports: $2.235 billion (2014 est.)
- Import goods: fuels, foodstuffs, equipment
- Main import partners: France 27.9%; United States 10.1%; China 7.3%; New Zealand 6.7%; Singapore 4.2%; (2017)
- Current account: $207.7 million (2014 est.)

Public finance
- Revenue: $1.891 billion (2012)
- Spending: $1.833 billion (2012)
- Economic aid: recipient: $580 million (2004)
- All values, unless otherwise stated, are in US dollars.

The economy of French Polynesia is one of a developed country with a service sector accounting for 75%. French Polynesia's GDP per capita is around $22,000, one of the highest in the Pacific region.

== History ==
=== Past economy ===
Before French colonisation, the Polynesian islands that constitute nowadays French Polynesia, relied on a subsistence economy. Work was heavily organised and performed by the community as a whole under the direction of the ruling ariʻi class and the priests (tahuʻa). Mountains were terraced for agriculture production, river banks were contained by stone walls, artificial soil was created on atolls in large trenches, and large systems made out of coral stone walls trapped and stocked live fish. Production outputs were divided by the ruling class between the population. James Cook's contact with the people of Tahiti following contact in later 18th century witnessed massive trade of fabrics, weaponry and other new foreign items with the use of nails (fao) as a improptu form of currency due to its foreign iron highly coveted for its hardness and malleability.

After the contact was established with European ships, foreign diseases killed large portions of the populations, and Christian beliefs and clergy produced a huge shift in the culture of those islands. With fewer population to feed, more land per capita was available, and the land use switched toward the limited production required by a family to live. Habitations moved toward seashores as the population relied more on the lagoon and sea trade. European ships stopped in those islands to purchase water, salted pork, dried fish and fresh fruits.

As French, English and Americans settled, part of the agriculture moved towards exports of oranges, copra, coffee, cotton, and vanilla. They also exported black pearls and sandalwood. Sandalwood nearly disappeared, cotton production was short-lived, as the US's South recovered from the American Civil War, and coffee and orange trees suffered from imported diseases that stopped those exports. Copra and vanilla prices and competition worldwide impacted heavily those productions in the second half of the 20th century, although they still exist. The guano mining at Makatea started in 1917 and stopped in 1966 when the stocks were depleted.

In 1962, France stationed military personnel in the region and started nuclear experimentations in Moruroa. French Polynesia's economy switched to services to support the military and the growing tourist industry.

=== 21st century ===
Tourism accounts nowadays for about 13% of the GDP, and is a primary source of foreign currency earnings. The tourist industry was heavily impacted after the 9/11 terrorist attacks and the 2008 economic crises, and never really recovered since. There are around 160,000 tourists per year. The local government mostly focuses its action at developing a high-end market with luxurious hotels built with foreign investment and French tax cut incentives, but many of these investments close after a few years. The subsidized air company Air Tahiti Nui brings tourists from France, Los Angeles, Japan and China. Other companies also operate, like Air France and Air New Zealand.

The small manufacturing sector primarily processes agricultural products. Vanilla and pearls are its main exports.

The public administration is an important part of the GDP and a provider of stable employment. The French republic finances the functionaries working in education, justice, hospitals, gendarmerie (military police), and military. The local government controls its own administration, like the ministry of agriculture, and oversees the administration and buildings of some sectors like schools. The local government also influence a large part of the economy through subsidies and development programs.

Some parts of the economy involve quasi-monopolistic groups due to the small economy size, the challenges of a country of small islands spread in a huge oceanic space, and the action of the government through subsidies and public companies. Some sectors show an important horizontal and vertical integration trend. Recently, the local government tries to maintain a healthy competition and regulate the growth of the biggest groups, but face many challenges. For example, it was unable to prevent a major supermarket group to develop its own vegetable production, ending its supplying contracts with local farmers. But it blocked the merger of two local shipping companies to avoid a monopoly on some trade routes. The price of shipping goods between islands is fixed by the government, and subsidies are provided for transporting some items like farming products or construction materials.

Some products' price margins are controlled by the local government to reduce the disparity of prices between the different archipelagos. Import taxes and VAT are fixed and collected by the local government that also control what imports are allowed to protect its agriculture and nature from diseases and invasive species.

The majority of the population is of mixed Polynesian and European origin. Around 5% of the population is of Asian origin, descending from farm workers imported in the 19th century to work in the cotton fields. They are present in the administration and trading sector of the economy. The recent metropolitan population is mostly involved in the state administration and in small and medium-sized enterprises.

== Currency ==
French Polynesia uses the Comptoirs Francais du Pacifique franc (CFPF), with 1 CFP franc subdivided into 100 centimes. The CFP franc was formerly linked at the exact official rate of 0.055 French francs to one Pacifique franc. When France switched its currency to the euro in 1999 this static link remained true, so that the rate is now about 119.26 Pacifique franc to one euro (1 euro being exactly 6.55957 French francs). In 2016 the exchange rate was 110.2 CFP francs per US dollar.

== Agriculture ==
Most Polynesians in agriculture farm traditional products like taro, ufi, casava and sweet potato to feed themselves and small surplus are sold for monetary income alongside a small fishing activity. Farmers of Asian origin tends to produce European and Asian vegetables for the local market.

The Moorea island developed pineapple production for local market and supplying the juice factory. Maupiti and Huahine produce watermelons. Tahiti and Tahaa have a small production of sugarcane for rum distillery.

Tahiti produces a small quantity of fresh milk, mostly for the local yogurt factory, as most of the population is used to drinking UHT and powdered milk from France and New Zealand. French Polynesia has a single slaughterhouse treating beef, pork, and chickens. The local beef meat production is very limited and mostly used to supply the local corned beef factory. Most of the meat comes from New Zealand, amounting to around 10% of the exports of fresh meat of this country. Two charcuteries produce ham, sausages, and pâtés from local and imported pork.

The copra production is heavily subsidized as the local government treats it as a form of social support for the remote islands with a limited range of economic activities possibilities like Tuamotu atolls. The copra is milled by the Huilerie de Tahiti to produce coconut oil mostly used for the monoi. The coconut cake residue is used as a cattle and pork feed, and surplus used to be exported to New Zealand.

Vanilla production depends heavily on the situation in Madagascar. When a typhoon hit this main supplier of vanilla, the market price increased worldwide and the local Polynesian government started a heavy program of subsidies and loans to develop vanilla farms. As the Polynesian production increased and Madagascar recovered, prices dropped and a lot of Polynesian farmers stopped caring for their vanilla plants. The plants are fragile and require regular care of experienced farmers. Diseases and insects can heavily reduce the production, and the cost of chemical products used impact the farmer harder when the vanilla prices are low. As the vanilla production falls, the price increase and the government started a new program of development, starting a new cycle. Despite the high price of Tahitian dried vanilla on the international market, it usually still finds buyers in the high-end market because of the specificities of its cultivar and quality.

In the 1990s, the commercial production of Noni started because of the supposed benefits of the juice of this fruit. Exports were mostly directed toward the North American market. But this production was short-lived, falling quickly from 7000 tonnes in 2005 down to 2000 tonnes in 2008, as the plant can be easily farmed in any tropical climate, especially in countries with lower labor costs and more land.

A small vineyard production exists in Rangiroa atoll and is aimed at the high-end market, capitalizing on its rarity and specificity of a vine grown on coral soil in a tropical island.

== Infrastructure ==
=== Transport ===
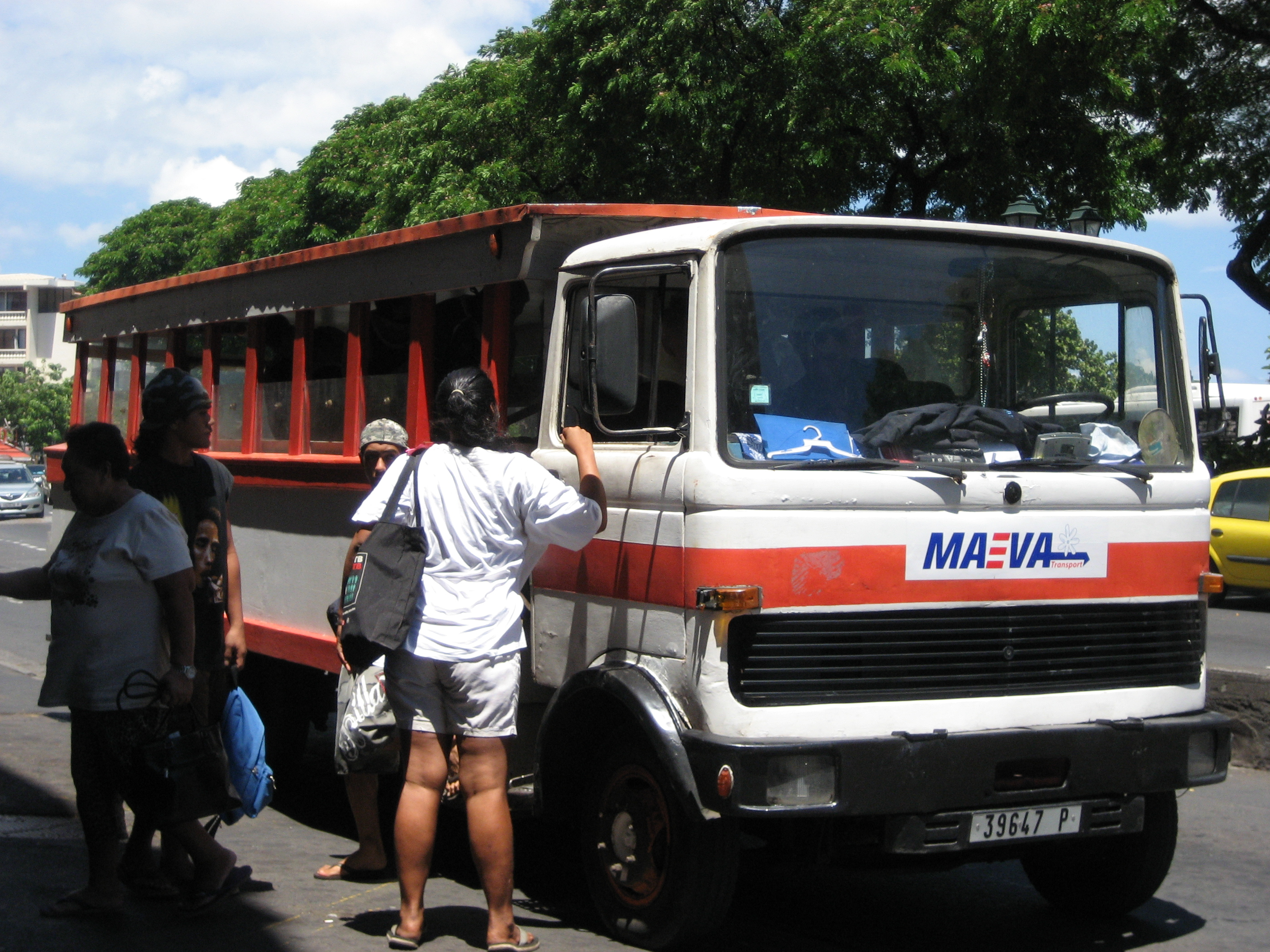
Le Truk bus service in Papeete, 2007.

Transport in French Polynesia is dominated by air travel, with a total of 37 airports with paved runways and another 13 airports without paved runways. Additionally, road transport is also a significant mode of transport within the islands that make up French Polynesia, with a total of 2590 kilometres of highways, 1735 km of which are paved.

=== Telecommunications ===
This article is about communications systems in French Polynesia.

The Honotua fiber optic cable connected Tahiti to Hawaii in 2010, increasing Internet speeds to 20 gigabits per second from 500 megabits per second. The cable will also connect to Moorea and the Leeward Islands of Huahine, Raiatea and Bora Bora.

=== Electricity ===
French Polynesia's electricity production in 2004 was 477 GWh. In 1998 59.72% of French Polynesia's electricity came from fossil fuel with the remainder from hydropower.

==== Renewable energy ====
Approximately 6% of primary energy in French Polynesia is generated from renewable energy sources. Approximately 30% of electricity is generated renewably, primarily Hydroelectricity and solar power. Renewable generation is concentrated on Tahiti, with other parts of French Polynesia almost entirely reliant on fossil fuels. Wind power is not used, with only two small facilities, both of which became non-functional due to lack of maintenance.

In December 2013 the Assembly of French Polynesia adopted a Law on the Guiding Principles of the Energy Policy of French Polynesia, requiring that a minimum of 50% of electricity be generated from renewable sources by 2020. This was replaced in November 2015 by the 2015-2030 Energy Transition Plan (PTE), which set a target of 75% renewables by 2030. The ETP was replaced in February 2022 by a multi-annual energy plan (PPE), and the 75% by 2030 target was retained.

In July 2016 the government announced that hybrid solar PV / battery / diesel power plants would be constructed on eight remote islands. In April 2021 the government called for tenders for 30MW of solar farms with batteries for Tahiti. Winners of the tenders were announced in March 2022.

In September 2022 Électricité de Tahiti performed a test to run the island of Tahiti entirely on renewables for an hour, using hydroelectricity and photovoltaics, with the Putu Uira battery system stabilising the grid. This was followed by a longer test a week later. Following the test EDT announced that would increasingly rely on renewables to power Tahiti during periods of good weather and low demand.

In July 2021 the French government agreed to provide a 7.1 billion XPF energy transition fund to decarbonise electricity production, particularly on remote islands. An agreement to implement the fund was signed in February 2023.

== See also ==
- Economy of France in: French Guiana, French Polynesia, Guadeloupe, Martinique, Mayotte, New Caledonia, Réunion, Saint Barthélemy, Saint Martin, Saint Pierre and Miquelon, Wallis and Futuna
- Taxation in France
- Economic history of France
- Poverty in France
