= Jacques Bloch-Morhange =

- Born: 31 January 1921; Paris, France
- Died: 15 August 1989 (aged 68)
- Occupation: Economist

Jacques Bloch-Morhange (31 January 1921 – 15 August 1989) was a French economist and author. In 1970, he revived the Ligue des contribuables, arguing for the repeal of the income tax in France.

== Works ==
- Bloch-Morhange, Jacques (1958). La stratégie des fusées. Paris: Plon. OCLC 15588126.
- Bloch-Morhange, Jacques (1961). Les politiciens. Paris: Fayard. OCLC 3314104.
- Bloch-Morhange, Jacques (1962). Fonder l'avenir : une dynamique sociale pour les Français. Paris: Fayard. OCLC 14203887.
- Bloch-Morhange, Jacques (1963). Le Gaullisme. Paris: Plon. OCLC 4562983.
- Bloch-Morhange, Jacques (1963). Vingt années d'histoire contemporaine. Paris: Plon. OCLC 9077938.
- Bloch-Morhange, Jacques (1966). Réponse à de Gaulle. Paris: Plon. OCLC 4563030.
- Bloch-Morhange, Jacques (1974). Propos sur l'essentiel. Paris: Informations et conjoncture. OCLC 1660482.
- Bloch-Morhange, Jacques (1975). Rafales. Paris: Informations et conjoncture. OCLC 4778764.
- Bloch-Morhange, Jacques (1977). Manifeste pour 12 millions de contribuables : un économiste accuse et propose. Paris: Plon. ISBN 9782259002622. OCLC 3729842.
- Bloch-Morhange, Jacques (1982). La grenouille et le scorpion. Paris: France-Empire. ISBN 9782704800315. OCLC 9896508.
- Bloch-Morhange, Jacques (1983). La révolte des contribuables : la fiscalité sous Mitterrand. Paris: Albatros. OCLC 11399965.
- Bloch-Morhange, Jacques (1985). La fin du colbertisme : pour une stratégie économique. Paris: Editions Albatros. OCLC 13795295.
