= Economy of Martinique =

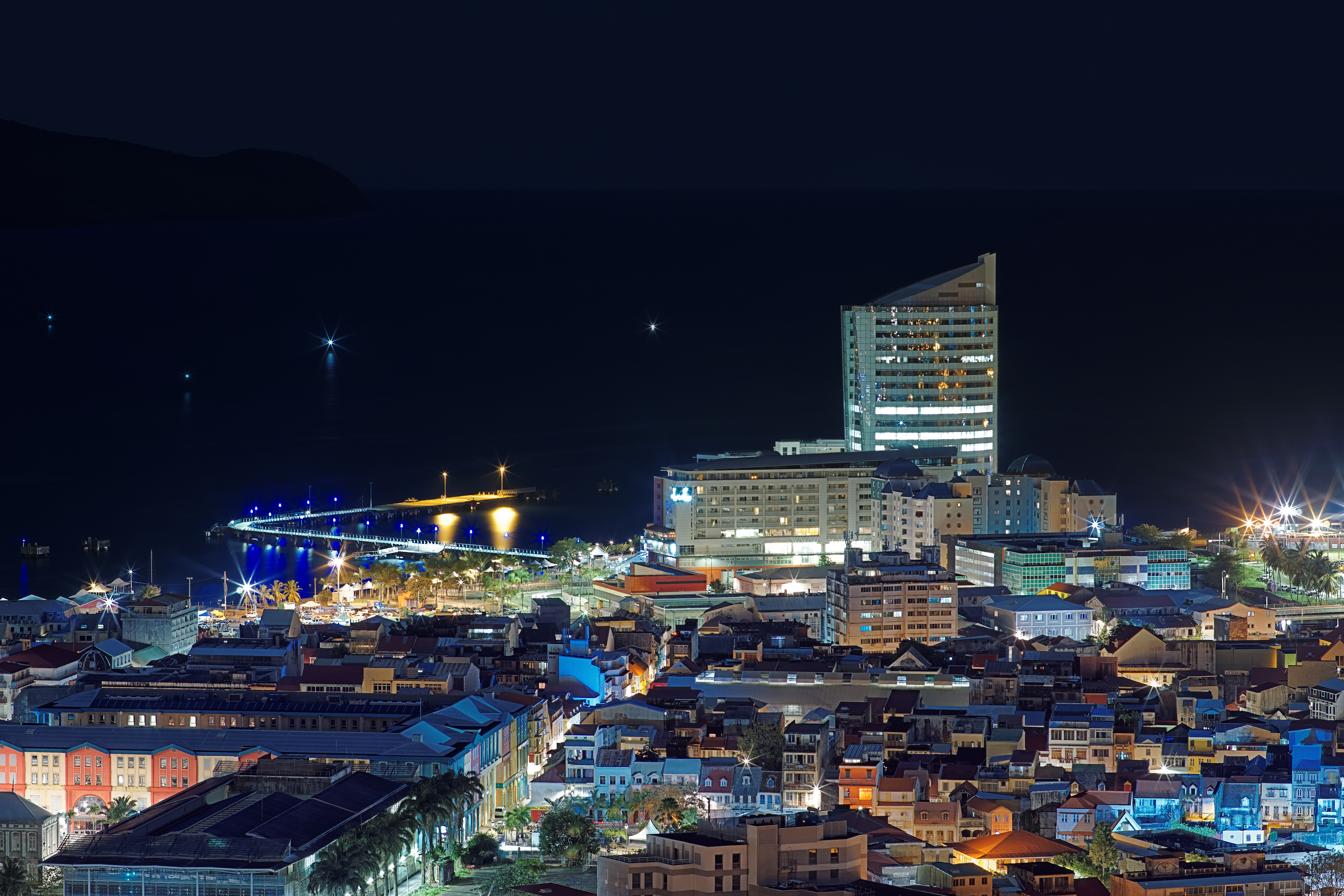
Fort-de-France, Martinique

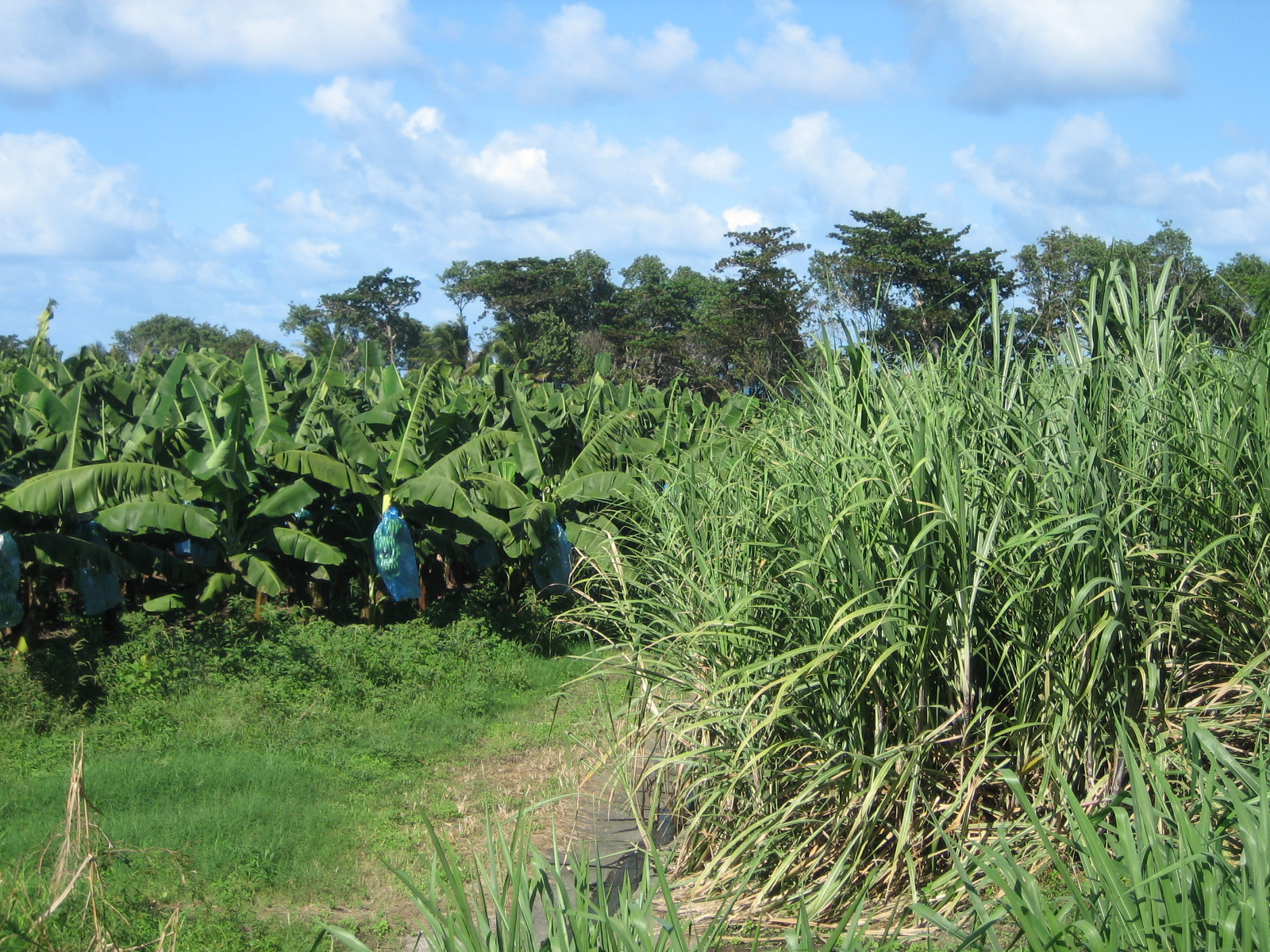
Sugar cane and banana plantations – the main agricultural products of Martinique

The economy of Martinique is mostly based in the services sector. Agriculture accounts for about 6% of Martinique's GDP and the small industrial sector for 11%. Sugar production has declined, with most of the sugarcane now used for the production of rum. Banana exports are increasing, going mostly to France. The bulk of meat, vegetable, and grain requirements must be imported, contributing to a chronic trade deficit that requires large annual transfers of aid from France. Tourism has become more important than agricultural exports as a source of foreign exchange. The majority of the work force is employed in the service sector and in administration.

== Gross domestic product ==
GDP: real exchange rate - US$9.61 billion (in 2006)

GDP - real growth rate: 2.8% (in 2006)

GDP - per capita: real exchange rate - US$24,118 (in 2006)

GDP - composition by sector:
agriculture: 6%
industry: 11%
services: 83% (1997 est.)

== Demographics ==
Population below poverty line: NA%

Household income or consumption by percentage share:
lowest 10%: NA%
highest 10%: NA%

Labor force: 165 900 (1998)

Labor force - by occupation: agriculture 7%, industry 20%, services 73% (1997)

Unemployment rate: 12,9% (2021)

Budget:
revenues: $900 million
expenditures: $2.5 billion, including capital expenditures of $140 million (1996)

== Industries ==
Industries: construction, rum, cement, petroleum refining, sugar, tourism

Industrial production growth rate: NA%

== Infrastructure ==
Electricity - production: 1,205 GWh (2003)

Electricity - production by source:
fossil fuel: 100%
hydro: 0%
nuclear: 0%
other: 0% (1998)

Electricity - consumption: 1535430MHW (2016)

Electricity - exports: 0 kWh (1998)

Electricity - imports: 0 kWh (1998)

== Agriculture ==
Agricultural products: pineapples, avocados, bananas, flowers, vegetables, sugarcane

Exports: US$957 million (in 2005)

Exports - commodities: refined petroleum products, bananas, rum, pineapples

Exports - partners: Mainland France 45%, Guadeloupe 28% (1997)

Imports: US$3,098 billion (in 2005)

Imports - commodities: petroleum products, crude oil, foodstuffs, construction materials, vehicles, clothing and other consumer goods

Imports - partners: Mainland France 62%, Venezuela 6%, Germany 4%, Italy 4%, US 3% (1997)

Debt - external: $180 million (1994)

Economic aid - recipient: Martinique receives substantial annual aid from the French state.

== Economics ==
Currency 1 euro (€) = 100 cents

Exchange rates: euros per US$1 – 0.9867 (January 2000), 0.9386 (1999); French francs (F) per US$1 – 5.65 (January 1999), 5.8995 (1998), 5.8367 (1997), 5.1155 (1996), 4.9915 (1995)

Fiscal year: calendar year

== See also ==
- Economy of France in: French Guiana, French Polynesia, Guadeloupe, Martinique, Mayotte, New Caledonia, Réunion, Saint Barthélemy, Saint Martin, Saint Pierre and Miquelon, Wallis and Futuna
- Poverty in France
- Crédit Martiniquais
