= Economy of New Caledonia =

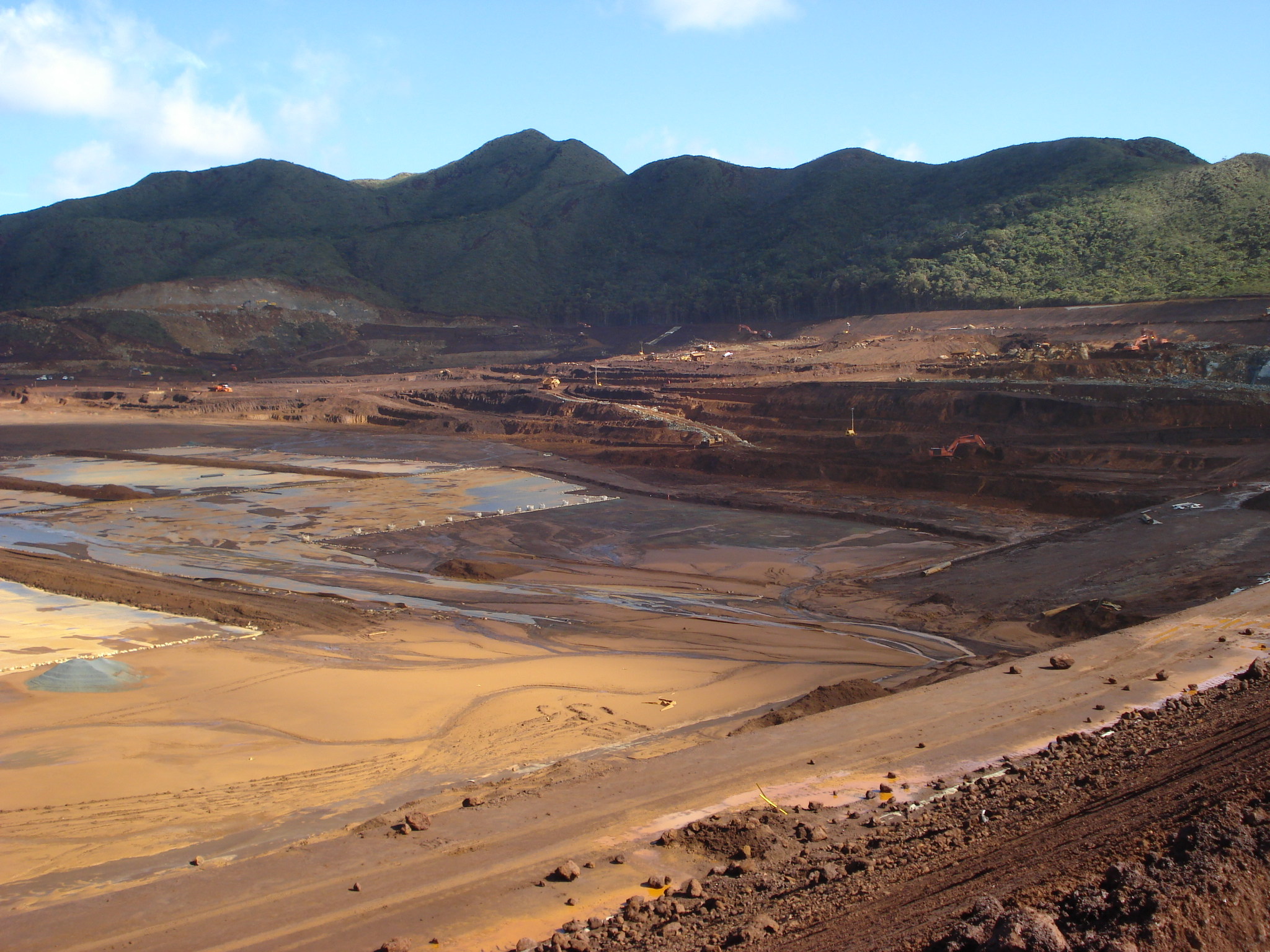
- Nickel mine
- Currency: CFP franc (₣)
- Fiscal year: Calendar year

Statistics
- GDP: ▲$10.432 billion (2023 est.)
- GDP growth: ▲2.8% (2014 est.)
- GDP per capita: ▲$35,651 (2023 est.)
- GDP by sector: agriculture: 1.4%; industry: 26.8%; services: 71.8% (2014 est.)
- Inflation (CPI): ▼0.4% (2014 est.)
- Labour force: 106,400 (2010 est.)
- Labour force by occupation: agriculture: 2.7%; industry: 22.4%; services: 74.4% (2010 est.)
- Unemployment: 12.8% (2020 est.)
- Youth unemployment: ▲33.1% (2025)
- Main industries: nickel mining and smelting

External
- Exports: ▲$2.21 billion (2014 est.)
- Export goods: ferronickels, nickel ore, fish
- Main export partners: China 59% South Korea 14% Japan 11% (2019 est.)
- Imports: ▼$2.72 billion (2015 est.)
- Import goods: machinery and equipment, fuels, chemicals, foodstuffs
- Main import partners: France 43% Australia 12% Singapore 12% China 6% (2019 est.)
- Gross external debt: ▲$112 million (31 December 2013 est.)
- All values, unless otherwise stated, are in US dollars.

New Caledonia is a major source for nickel and contains roughly 10% of the world's known nickel supply. The islands contain about 7,100,000 tonnes of nickel. With the annual production of about 107,000 tonnes in 2009, New Caledonia was the world's fifth largest producer after Russia (266,000), Indonesia (189,000), Canada (181,000) and Australia (167,000). In recent years, the economy has suffered because of depressed international demand for nickel due to the 2008 financial crisis. Only a negligible amount of the land is suitable for cultivation, and food accounts for about 20% of imports. In addition to nickel, the substantial financial support from France and tourism are keys to the health of the economy. In the 2000s, large additions were made to nickel mining capacity. It accounted for 6% of the total global nickel production in 2023, and exports an estimated €1.9 billion worth of nickel annually. However, the need to respond to environmental concerns over the country's globally recognized ecological heritage, may increasingly need to be factored into capitalization of mining operations.

The GDP of New Caledonia in 2007 was 8.8 billion US dollars at market exchange rates, the fourth-largest economy in Oceania after Australia, New Zealand, and Hawaii. The GDP per capita was 36,376 US dollars in 2007 (at market exchange rates, not at PPP), lower than in Australia and Hawaii, but higher than in New Zealand.

In 2007, exports from New Caledonia amounted to 2.11 billion US dollars, 96.3% of which were mineral products and alloys (essentially nickel ore and ferronickel). Imports amounted to 2.88 billion US dollars. 26.6% of imports came from Metropolitan France, 16.1% from other European countries, 13.6% from Singapore (mostly fuel), 10.7% from Australia, 4.0% from New Zealand, 3.2% from the United States, 3.0% from China, 3.0% from Japan, and 22.7% from other countries.

== Mining ==
New Caledonia's industry is largely centered around its nickel mining operations, accounting for roughly 20% of employment. Roughly 7% of the world's nickel reserves are held on the island, which is the world's fourth largest producer of nickel. Mines in the north are largely owned by the Kanak collective Sofinor, while the large Goro mine and processing plant in the south, previously solely operated by Vale, has been sold to Prony Resources, a consortium owned by Vale (50%), Trafigura (25%) and other unidentified private investors (25%), in April 2021.

== Tourism ==
As of 2007, about 200 Japanese couples travel to New Caledonia each year for their wedding and honeymoon. Oceania Flash reported in 2007 that one company planned to build a new wedding chapel to accommodate Japanese weddings to supplement the Le Meridien Resort in Nouméa.

University of Queensland students have the opportunity to study French in New Caldeonia.

== See also ==
- Economy of France in: French Guiana, French Polynesia, Guadeloupe, Martinique, Mayotte, New Caledonia, Réunion, Saint Barthélemy, Saint Martin, Saint Pierre and Miquelon, Wallis and Futuna
- Taxation in France
- Economic history of France
- Poverty in France
