= Marie-Thérèse Join-Lambert =

French government official (1936–2023)

President of the Observatoire National de la Pauvreté et de l'Exclusion Sociale
- In office 5 May 1999 – 25 February 2005
- Preceded by: position established
- Succeeded by: Agnès Claret de Fleurieu

Personal details
- Born: Marie-Thérèse Kourilsky; 1 October 1936 16th arrondissement of Paris, France
- Died: 22 March 2023 (aged 86)
- Education: Sciences Po
- Occupation: Government official

Marie-Thérèse Join-Lambert (née Kourilsky; 1 October 1936 – 22 March 2023) was a French government official. She was president of the Observatoire National de la Pauvreté et de l'Exclusion Sociale (ONPES) from 1999 to 2005.

== Biography ==
Born in the 16th arrondissement of Paris on 1 October 1936, Join-Lambert was the daughter of professor Raoul Kourilsky. She graduated from Sciences Po and served as director of studies and professional counsel at the Agence nationale pour l'emploi from 1974 to 1977. She then served as deputy rapporteur of the Centre d'études des revenus et des coûts until 1981.

In May 1981, Join-Lambert was appointed a project manager in the cabinet of Prime Minister Pierre Mauroy. She headed the social affairs department of the General Planning Commission from 1981 to 1982 and was vice-president of an industrial strategy group from 1982 to 1985. That year, she was appointed director of IGAS.

In 1988, Join-Lambert was hired as a social policy advisor to Prime Minister Michel Rocard. She was a member of the Haut Conseil à l'intégration from 1990 to 1997. In January 1998, in the midst of an unemployment crisis, Prime Minister Lionel Jospin tasked her with research on unemployment assistance. She turned in a report on unemployment compensation on 25 February 1998.

Join-Lambert served as the founding president of ONPES from 5 May 1999 to 25 February 2005. She also chaired the Exclusion Committee of the Union nationale interfédérale des œuvres et organismes privés non lucratifs sanitaires et sociaux and the "Mal-Logement" group of the Conseil national de l'information statistique. She wrote numerous reports and manuals, including the 1997 publication Politiques sociales, in which she supervised the teaching of social issues.

Marie-Thérèse Join-Lambert died on 22 March 2023, at the age of 86.

== Decorations ==
- Grand Officer of the Legion of Honour (2014)
