= Economy of Wallis and Futuna =

Exports of Wallis and Futuna by product category (2019) Chemical products Transportation Machines Mineral products Plastics and rubbers Metals Foodstuffs Precious metals Textiles Instruments Animal products Vegetable products Paper goods Footwear and headwear Miscellaneous Stone and glass Wood products Animal and vegetable bi-products Animal hides Arts and antiques Weapons

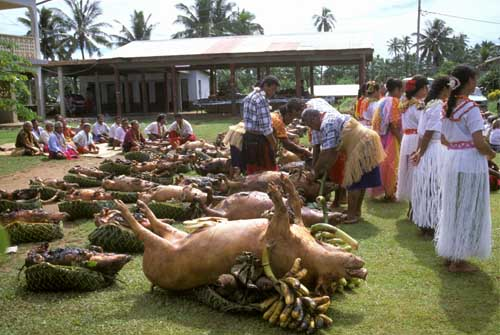
Roasted pigs of Wallis and Futuna

This page is an overview of the economy of Wallis and Futuna.

== Finance ==
The GDP of Wallis and Futuna in 2005 was 188 million US dollars at market exchange rates. The GDP per capita was 12,640 US dollars in 2005 (at market exchange rates, not at PPP), which is lower than in New Caledonia, French Polynesia, and all the other French overseas departments and territories (except Mayotte), but higher than in all the small insular independent states of Oceania.

Along with the French territories of New Caledonia and French Polynesia, the territory uses the CFP Franc, which is fixed vs. the euro, at the rate of 1,000 XPF = 8.38 euro. In 1991, BNP Nouvelle-Calédonie, a subsidiary of BNP Paribas, established a subsidiary, Banque de Wallis et Futuna, which currently is the only bank in the territory. Two years earlier Banque Indosuez had closed the branch at Mata-Utu that it had opened in 1977, leaving the territory without any bank.

== Agriculture and industry ==
The territory's economy is limited to traditional subsistence agriculture, with about 80% of the labor force earning its livelihood from agriculture (coconuts and vegetables), livestock (mostly pigs), and fishing. Agricultural products include breadfruit, yams, taro, bananas, pigs, and goats.

Industries include copra, handicrafts, fishing, and lumber. In 2007, US$63 million worth of commodities (foodstuffs, manufactured goods, transportation equipment, fuel, clothing) were imported, primarily from France, Singapore, Australia, and New Zealand, and there were no exports (the previous year, in 2006, exports amounted to US$122,000 and consisted entirely of 19 tons of trochus shells). About 4% of the population is employed in government. Revenues come from French government subsidies, licensing of fishing rights to Japan and South Korea, import taxes, and remittances from expatriate workers in New Caledonia, French Polynesia and France.

== See also ==
- Economy of France in: French Guiana, French Polynesia, Guadeloupe, Martinique, Mayotte, New Caledonia, Réunion, Saint Barthélemy, Saint Martin, Saint Pierre and Miquelon, Wallis and Futuna
- Taxation in France
- Economic history of France
- Poverty in France
