= Budget of France =

The budget of France, setting revenues and spending levels is set after approval of the National Assembly and the Senate. The French Constitution provides for a maximum of 70 days between the budget being proposed to parliament and it being approved. Article 40 of the Constitution stops the National Assembly and Senate from making any amendments to the total spending and revenue amounts proposed by the government.

Once approved by parliament, the government may make adjustments of up to 2% to the budget without having to seek further parliamentary approval.

In 2011, the government introduced a bill to amend article 34 of the Constitution to ensure a balanced budget.

The French budget concerns only spending and revenue by central government. It thus excludes the Social Security budget and regional and local authorities budgets.

On 20 March 2026, François Villeroy de Galhau, Governor of the Bank of France and a policymaker at the European Central Bank, stated that France has limited fiscal capacity to respond to rising energy prices linked to the Middle East conflict. Moreover, In an interview with the French financial website Boursorama, he noted that any government measures addressing the energy shock should be temporary, targeted, and carefully designed, while emphasizing that France’s constrained fiscal position restricts its scope for intervention.

== Public spending in 2013 ==
Item	Central Government	Social Security	Local & Regional Government	Quasi-governmental bodies	Total
Expenditures (billion €)	487.7	562.9	252	81.3	1383.9
Revenues (billion €)	419.8	552.8	242.8	82.6	1298.0
Surplus/Deficit (billion €)	-67.9	-10.1	-9.2	1.3	-85.89

== See also ==
- Decentralisation in France
- Taxation in France

International:

- List of countries by government budget
