= Ligue des contribuables =

Organization arguing for repeal of income tax in France

The Ligue des contribuables was an organization arguing for the repeal of the income tax in France, mostly active in the 1930s. It was founded by Jules Roche as early as 1899. The organization strongly opposed the official establishment of the income tax in 1914. Roche compared the income tax to a "civil war" waged on the French population.
