= Windward Islands Federation of Labour =

WIFOL
- Windward Islands Federation of Labour
- Headquarters: Philipsburg, Sint Maarten
- Location: Sint Maarten
- Members: 3500
- Key people: Theophilus Thompson, president Curtis Vanterpool, general secretary
- Affiliations: ITUC

The Windward Islands Federation of Labour (WIFOL) is a trade union federation on the island of Sint Maarten. It represents the majority of workers on the island and is affiliated with the International Trade Union Confederation.
