= Observatoire National de la Pauvreté et de l'Exclusion Sociale =

The Observatoire National de la Pauvreté et de l'Exclusion Sociale (ONPES) is an agency of the French government. It aims at assessing poverty and exclusion in France.

== Overview ==
The Observatoire National de la Pauvreté et de l'Exclusion Sociale was created in 1998. It comprises 22 members, with oversight by a president every three years. The current president is Agnès de Fleurieu. Members are representatives of the Conseil National des Politiques de Lutte contre l’Exclusion (CNLE), the Direction de la Recherche, des Etudes, de l’Evaluation et des Statistiques (DREES), the Institut National de la Statistique et des Etudes Economiques (INSEE), the Centre d’Analyse Stratégique (CAS), the Direction de l’Animation de la Recherche et des Etudes Statistiques (DARES), the Direction Générale du Trésor et de la Politique Economique (DGTPE), the Caisse nationale des Allocations Familiales (CAF), as well as seven researchers or academics, and seven more qualified people. They produce an annual report for the Prime Minister.
