= Poverty in France =

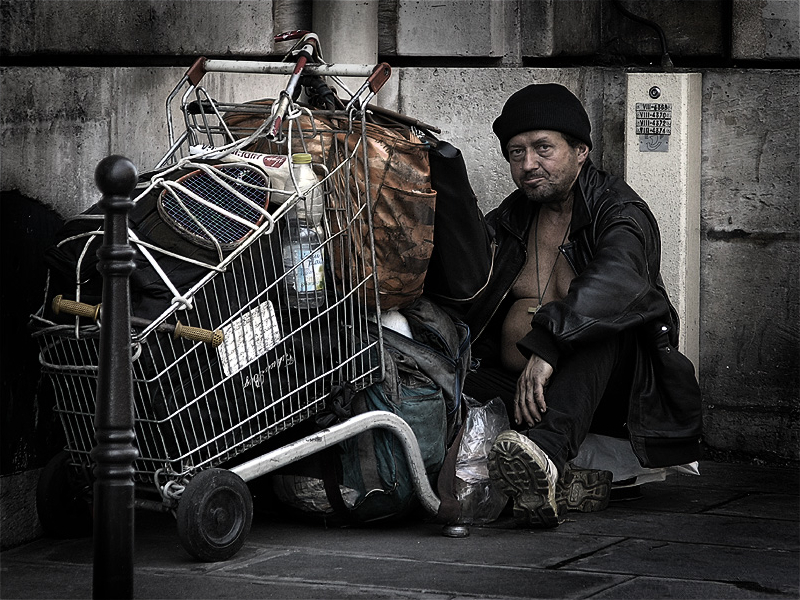
A homeless man in Paris.

Poverty in France is concerned with the incidence and impact of absolute and relative poverty in modern France. Poverty has fallen by 60% over thirty years. Although it affected 15% of the population in 1970, in 2001 only 6.1% (or 3.7 million people) were below the poverty line (which, according to INSEE's criteria, is half of the median income).

== Historical perspective ==
An OECD study from the early 1970s estimated that 16% of the French population lived in poverty, compared with 13% in the United States, 11% in Canada, 7.5% in the United Kingdom, and 3% in Germany. Other national estimates at the time were 13% (the United States), 11% (Canada), 8% (Australia), 5% (Norway), and 3.5% (Sweden).

In 1975, a basic tax-free cash allowance starting at £665 for children under the age of ten provided a considerable amount of support for families living on low incomes, and its combination with direct taxation meant greater support to poor families than in any other country in the EEC. A two-parent family with four dependent children on 66% of average earnings gained an amount after tax and allowances equal to 49.4% of its income compared with 8.2% in the United Kingdom. Nevertheless, that same year, INSEE found that at any wage level disposable income per head was still much lower in large families than those with no or very few children, while the cost of bringing up a family weighed particularly heavily on households headed by a low-paid worker. According to one estimate from the early 1970s, using 1500 francs net per month for those in full-time employment, 44% of women and 24.5% of men were low paid. The percentage of workers who were low paid was particularly high in personal services, such as hairdressing (74%), hotel and catering (60%) and textiles (51%).

In comparison with the average French workers, foreign workers tended to be employed in the hardest and lowest-paid jobs. They also live in poor conditions. A 1972 study found that foreign workers earned 17% less than their French counterparts, although this national average concealed the extent of inequality. Foreign workers were more likely to be men in their prime working years in the industrial areas, which generally had higher rates of pay than elsewhere.

In 1974, the National Assembly's Commission on Cultural, Family and Social Affairs estimated that 5% of the population should be considered as "living in a state of destitution or on the borderline of destitution". Studies by Serge Milano, Lionel Stoleru, and Rene Lenoir estimated that between 10% and 14% of the population lived in poverty from 1970 to 1980. A report by the EEC estimated that 14.8% of households in France lived in poverty in 1975, defined as living below the threshold of 50% mean annual income.

European Community policies on combatting poverty have applied across the European Economic Community and European Union, including France.

Previously, the poor were for the most part retirees. The trend reversed itself in the 1980s with an increase in unemployment among young people; while poverty among the elderly dropped 85% (from 27.3% to 3.8%), among those still in the workforce it increased by 38% over the same 30 years (from 3.9% to 5.4%). Various social welfare programs have had an important impact in low-income households, and in 2002, they may in some cases have represented more than 50% of the household's income.

In 2008, the OECD claimed that France was "one of only five OECD countries where income inequality and poverty have declined over the past 20 years".

As a result of the European migrant crisis, beginning in 2015, makeshift and squalid migrant camps have begun regularly appearing around the capital city with French officials routinely clearing and dismantling them as of October 2016. Such camps are also becoming a common occurrence in Northern France, along the coast of La Manche, which migrants hope to cross in an attempt to reach Britain. The Calais Jungle is perhaps the best known example of this.

== Status in 2005 ==
The poverty threshold was fixed at 645 euros per person per month. By comparison, the revenu minimum d'insertion (RMI, which idea draws on guaranteed minimum income, although it is not distributed to everyone) was at that time 440.86 euros per month for a person living alone. The French poverty threshold is slightly higher than that of the United States, suggesting that some who would be considered living in poverty in France would not be if they had the same income in the United States. However, it is difficult to compare them as they are not calculated in the same way, notwithstanding differences in cost or standards of living. While the French poverty threshold is calculated as being half of the median income, the U.S. poverty threshold is based on dollar costs of the economy food plan, that is, on income inequality

In 2005:

- A million children (8%) were living below the poverty line;
- 42,000 children were affected by lead poisoning, a sign of decrepit housing; lead-based paint has been banned in new buildings since 1915, to all professionals since 1948, and to everyone since 1993. The risk of exposure to lead today is four times greater for buildings constructed before 1915 than for a building constructed between 1915 and 1948.
- 500,000 housing units were unclean.
- 200,000 students were in difficult financial situations, which has led some young women to pay for their studies through prostitution. This phenomenon is on the rise in the country (in 2006, the students' union SUD Etudiant estimated the number to be 40,000).

Nevertheless, social services allow France to have one of the lowest child mortality rates despite this poverty.

Despite the positive developments, it seems that rural areas have been attracting more and more of those left behind; a non-negligible segment of at-risk city populations have been moving to the country and joining the ranks of small-time farmers among "rural" welfare recipients. This phenomenon is partly explained by the lower cost of rural living compared with that in cities.

Another indicator of poverty is the RMI. In 1994, in metropolitan France, the number of RMI recipients was 783,436; ten years later (in June 2004), it rose to 1,041,026. In the overseas departments, it was 105,033 at the end of 1994 and 152,892 in June 2004. From December 2004 to December 2005, the number of RMI recipients increased by 4.7% according to the Secours catholique NGO.

== Bidonvilles ==
Bidonvilles ("can towns") are shanty towns that exist in the urban outskirts of France and often have little access to roads or public services (such as electricity or access to water). Although once thought to be a phenomenon exclusive to the 1960s and 1970s, bidonvilles again gained attention in the French media in the 2000s. Often populated by immigrants, bidonvilles produce a degree of residential segregation between French nationals and recently arrived immigrant groups at a scale higher than any other western European city in the postwar years. However, most attention on residential poverty in France is now associated with the Parisian suburbs, or banlieues.

In the late 1960s, there were eighty-nine bidonvilles on the outskirts of Paris. During this time, bidonvilles were often associated with immigrant groups from North Africa. However this is partly an exaggerated stereotype, as the largest bidonville of the Paris area in the 1960s (Champigny-sur-Marne) was populated mostly by Portuguese. That being said, a Ministry of the Interior census carried out in 1966 suggested that the majority of the 46,827 people living in the 119 Parisian bidonvilles were of North African origin. Other bidonvilles were concentrated north-west of Paris, including near Nanterre, Gennevilliers, Asnières, and Colombes.

In 1964, the Loi Debré sought to eliminate bidonvilles, and the urban formation was erroneously thought to have disappeared in the 1970s with the transformation of Nanterre's bidonville into a modern city. However, a 1973 count estimated at least 8,600 still living in bidonvilles around Paris.

First-hand accounts describe the hardship of living in bidonvilles in the 1960s: "We live amongst mud and rubbish. There's no difference between us and animals...It's not life that we lead here: even the rats come to eat us...I tell you – even the animals live better than we do." A former occupant recalled the emotional legacy of life in the Nanterre bidonville even after its destruction: "Now they've got rid of almost all the bidonvilles at Nanterre, but they still exist in our heads and in our thinking. Life in a bidonville is something you never forget."

However, bidonvilles may have provided certain measures of social freedom and political space for disadvantaged or marginalized groups, albeit at the cost of appalling daily living conditions. For example, established bidonvilles with more experienced immigrant communities could provide a network of support or feeling of solidarity to a newly arrived migrant greater than what they might find in the city center.

Despite persistent attempts to rehouse individuals living in bidonvilles (and the more fragmented "micro-bidonvilles"), they remain a reality in places like Villeurbanne (Lyon), where a bidonville contains 500 persons of Romani origins, a third of them children. In February 2007, bulldozers destroyed a bidonville in Bobigny, a northeastern suburb of Paris, where 266 Romanian and Bulgarian citizens had been registered. Another huge bidonville exists near Calais, inhabited by migrants from the Middle-East, North Africa and sub-Saharan Africa hoping to get to the United Kingdom. It has been destroyed several times, but since the people are in France illegally, they have nowhere else to go, and eventually they return to the same place.

Bidonvilles are also common in the overseas departments.

== Number of persons in France estimated to be living below the poverty line (1970–2002) ==
Poverty rate at 50%

1970 12%

1975 10.2%

1979 8.3%

1984 7.7%

1990 6.6%

1996 7.2%

1998 6.7%

2000 6.5%

2002 6%

Poverty rate at 60% line

1970 17.9%

1975 16.6%

1979 14.2%

1984 13.5%

1990 13.8%

1996 13.5%

1998 12.8%

2000 12.7%

2002 12.2%

== See also ==
- Abbé Pierre
- Observatoire National de la Pauvreté et de l'Exclusion Sociale
- Poverty by country
- State medical aid
