= Taxation in France =

In France, taxation is determined by the yearly budget vote by the French Parliament, which determines which kinds of taxes can be levied and which rates can be applied.

== Overview ==
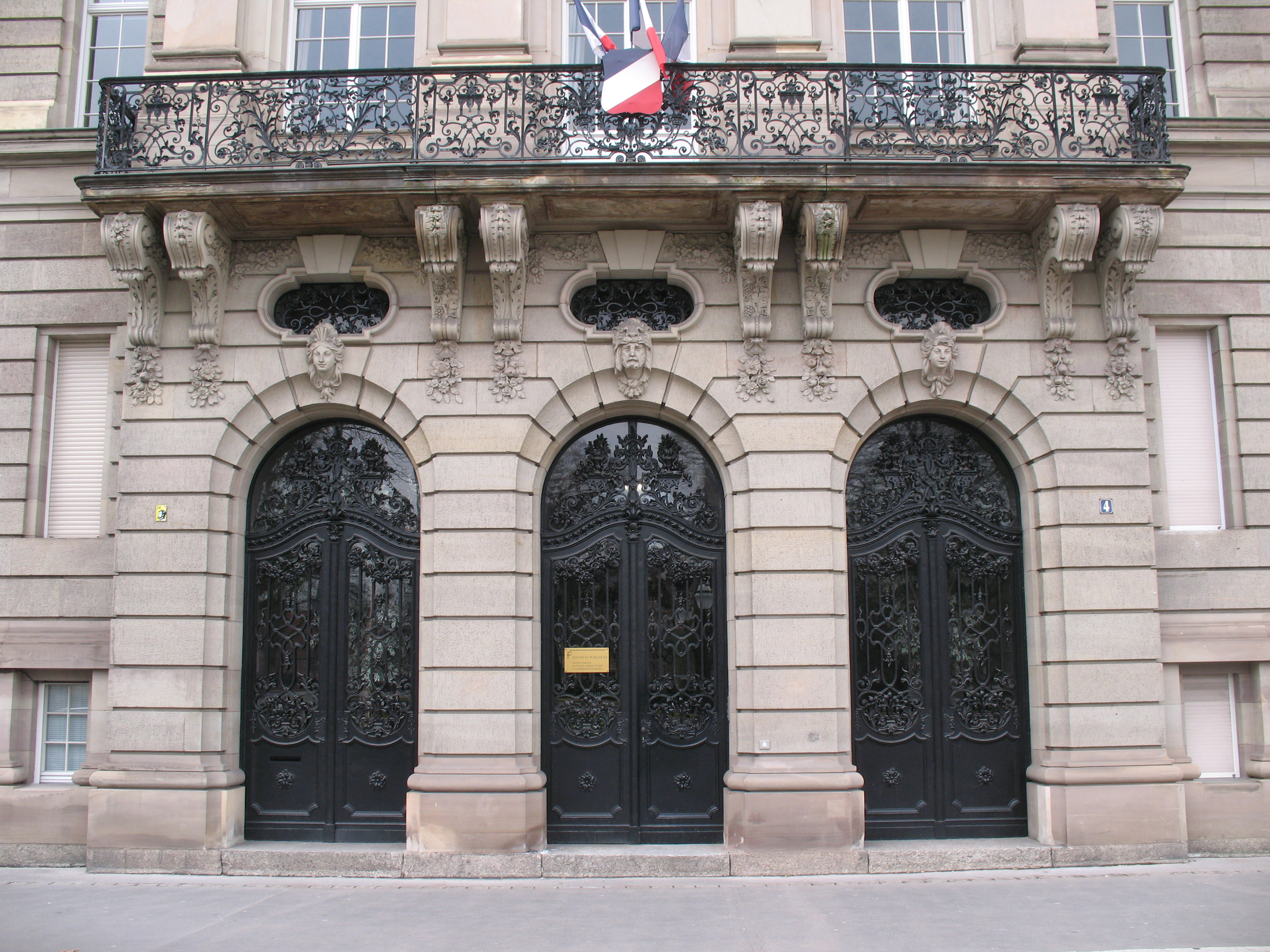
The main entrance of Direction régionale des finances publiques of Alsace in Strasbourg

Taxation in France covers all taxes, duties, fees, contributions and social security contributions imposed by the public authorities on French individuals and companies or those living in France. Taxes are thus levied by the government, and collected by the public administrations. According to INSEE, public administrations can be defined as "all institutional units whose main function is to produce non-market goods and services or to redistribute national income and wealth, and whose resources come mainly from compulsory contributions paid by units belonging to other institutional sectors". French "public administrations" are made up of three different institutions:

- the central government, i.e. the national government or the state ("l'État") strictly speaking, plus various central government bodies. It has a separate budget (general budget, special Treasury accounts, special budgets). It collects most of the taxes.
- local governments, which include agencies with limited territorial jurisdiction, such as local authorities, local public establishments, chambers of commerce and all public or quasi-public bodies financed primarily by local governments. They collect many taxes, but their weight is rather limited compared to that of central government.
- social security association (ASSO), private organizations endowed with a mission of public service (even though they behave to a large extent like public administrations). Their budget is made up of all compulsory social security contributions (general scheme, unemployment insurance schemes, complementary retirement funds and welfare benefit funds, funds for the liberal professions and agricultural funds, special employee schemes) and the agencies financed by such contributions (social works, public and private sector hospitals contributing to public hospital services and financed from an aggregate operating grant). They are mostly financed by social contributions, collected for the sole purpose of social welfare.

Taxes in France are made up of taxes (compulsory, unrequited payments to public authorities), plus social security contributions. Most of the taxes are collected by the government and the local collectivities, while the social deductions are collected by the Social Security. There is a distinction to be made between taxes (impôts), which applies to production, importations, wealth and incomes, and social contributions (cotisations sociales), which are payments, calculated as a percentage of salary, which entitle employees to social benefits in the event of illness, unemployment or when they claim their pension. These social contributions are payable by both the employer and the employee. Taxes and contributions together are called in French prélèvements obligatoires (compulsory deductions).

All economic agents (individuals or legal entities involved in economic activity) pay tax in France. There are many types of tax, mainly affecting households and businesses. There is a distinction to be made between those liable to pay tax and taxpayers (economic agents who pay tax are called taxpayers, while taxpayers are those who actually bear the burden of tax). People having their tax residence in France are subject to French tax. Thus, they are natural or legal persons either living in France, i.e. have their homes or principal residence in France; working in France; or having the center of their economic interests in France. Any one of these criteria is sufficient for a person to be treated as taxable.

Despite a downward trend registered since 1999, the tax burden in 2022 (46,1% of GDP) remains at a high level, both historically and in comparison with other countries. OECD countries have experienced an increase in the tax burden since the mid-1960s comparable to that of France, rising from 25% of the GDP in 1965 to 34% in 2022. That of the countries of the European Union has increased by nearly 12 percentage points of GDP over the period. Efforts to control the increase in the tax burden have been made by the states of the OECD: the tax rate decelerated during the 90s and has decreased slightly since 2000. This is why France continues to be among the OECD countries whose tax rate is the highest. Taxes account for 46,1% of GDP against 34% on average in OECD countries. The overall rate of social security and tax on the average wage in 2022 was 82% of gross salary, compared with 77% of the total average tax wedge. The levels of social security contributions are particularly high (17% of GDP against 9% of GDP on average for OECD). The social security budgets are larger than the budget of the national government. The budgets of both the national government and social security organizations run deficits.

== List of taxes ==
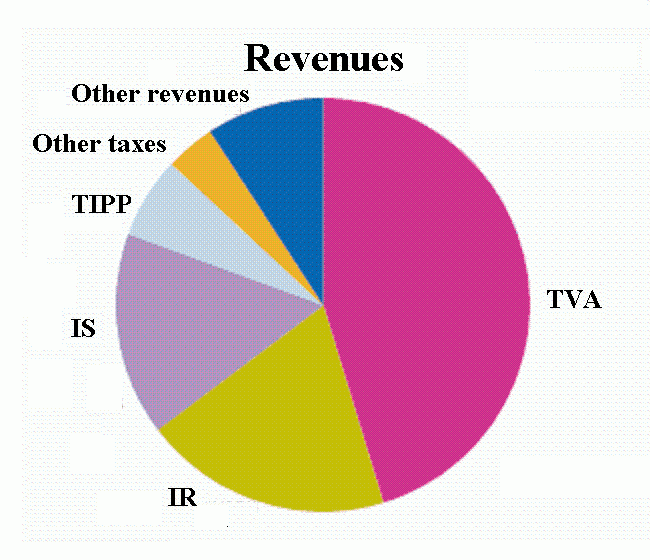
Part of each tax in the total tax revenue, without the social contributions

Taxes in France can be classified according to the institution which collects and benefit from them and to the people who pay them. Taxes are monetary benefits imposed on people according to their capacities and without return of benefit, for the purpose of public expenditure to achieve economic and social goals set by the government. As for tariffs, they are different from taxes because of their strictly economic aspect; their purpose is to protect the domestic market. However, some charges levied by the customs administration are taxes: the value added tax levied on goods from non-members of the European Union, the tax on petroleum products, which applies regardless of the origin of products, and other taxes. social security contributions are collected for social protection. Some other taxes, based on personal income, are allocated to social agencies and do not give taxpayers the right to benefit from them.

=== Taxes on production and importation ===
These taxes, collected by public administrations or by the institutions of the EU, apply to the production and the consumption of goods and of services. These taxes are independent from profits. They include taxes on the products and others taxes on the production. The taxes on the production cover essentially the taxe professionnelle, the taxe foncière, and the versement transport (the professional tax, tax land and the payment transport), which apply to the use of labour and the property or the use of land, buildings and other assets used for the sake of production. They are local taxes, so they are not collected by the central government (see Local taxes). Taxes on consumption traditionally consisted of indirect duties on the consumption and excise duties, applying only on the use of certain products (alcoholic beverages, manufactured, tobacco products and energy products). However, the establishment of the VAT and its generalization have considerably reduced the scope and thus the revenue of these indirect duties and excise duties even if one of them, the tax on petroleum products, is still considerable. In 2022, taxes on production paid by companies represented 3.3% of GDP in France, compared with an average of 1.5% for the eurozone and 1.7% for the European Union.

==== Value-Added Tax (VAT) ====
In order to establish a single market made up of the member states of the European Union, a number of directives on VAT has been enacted since 1967, with the obligation for states to adapt their domestic legislation. The rules relating to the scope, the tax base, the payment, the territoriality of goods and services as well as reporting requirements are partially harmonized, but states can apply transitional arrangements in respect of rates, exemptions and rights of deduction, whose rules are being harmonized.

The VAT (French: taxe sur la valeur ajoutée, TVA) is a general consumption tax, which applies to goods and services located in France. It is a proportional tax on output collected by the companies and ultimately completely supported by the final buyer, i.e. the consumer, since it is included in the price of goods or services. Indeed, VAT is applied to the "added value", i.e. the added value to the product or service at each stage of production or marketing, so that at the end of the economic circuit, the overall tax burden corresponds to the tax calculated on the final price paid by the consumer. The current standard rate is at 20%. Two reduced rates exist: a 10% rate for books, hotel stays, local public transportation, and restaurant meals; and 5.5% for most groceries. A specific rate of 2.1% applies only to prescription drugs covered by Social Security. In 2021, the state collected around 152 billion euro from the total VAT revenue, while other organizations collected roughly 91.2 billion euros.

==== Tax on petroleum products ====
The taxe intérieure de consommation sur les produits énergétiques (TICPE) applies to petroleum products and biofuels according to fixed rates provided by the legislation. It applies only in metropolitan France – in the overseas territories, there is a special consumption tax (TSC) on premium unleaded and diesel. It applies to motor fuels and heating fuels, such as petrol and gasoline, electricity, natural gas, coal and coke. It replaced the previous TIPP tax that only applied to petroleum products. In the face of the rise in oil prices, a reduction in the rate of the TIPP for fuel sold to consumers was adopted by the Parliament in 2006. The TIPP is collected by the services de la direction générale des douanes et des droits indirects (DGDDI) when fuel products are consumed on the domestic market. The revenue from the TICPE amounted to 30.5bn, or 1.15% of GDP, in 2022. Energy products are subject to both the tax on energy products (TICPE) and the value added tax (VAT). The TICPE is also included in the taxable amount of energy products subject to VAT.

Since January 2023, petrol is taxed at a rate of €0.53799/litre and diesel at a rate of €0.42875/litre, with a VAT of 16% added to the total price. As of 2022, a "maximum fuel price" has been established by the government, capped at €1.546/litre for EURO 95 petrol and at €1.525/litre for diesel as of 11 November 2023.

=== Taxes on wealth ===
Wealth may be subject to taxation when transmitted for sale or for free (gift, inheritance). In most cases, inheritance tax has to be paid. However, there are a number of exemptions. To determine inheritance tax, you must first determine the net taxable assets, the taxable estate assets, the personal allowance, and finally the taxable portion. In addition, it may be taxed when owned: wealth is subject to annual taxation through the impôt de solidarité sur la fortune (ISF) and local property taxes are payable on real estate. Capital gains is payable when assets are disposed of, but this tax is a tax on the profit.

==== Stamps acts ====
The taxes called droits d'enregistrement, correspond to the stamp acts. They mainly apply to the sale of buildings (in addition to local taxes), inheritance and gifts, assignment of businesses and registration of vehicles. Revenues collected by the state amounted in 2006 to €14.7 bn.

==== Wealth Tax ====
| 2017 Rates Value of net assets | Rate % |
|---|---|
| Below €800,000 | 0 |
| Between €800,001 and €1,300,000 | 0.5 |
| Between €1,290,001 and €2,570,000 | 0.7 |
| Between €2,570,001 and €5,000,000 | 1 |
| Between €5,000,001 and €10,000,000 | 1.25 |
| Beyond €10,000,001 | 1.5 |

It was abolished by the French government in September 2017.

Wealth Tax (solidarity tax on wealth), in French impôt de solidarité sur la fortune (ISF) was an annual tax payable by individuals the net value of whose wealth exceeds a certain amount. It was established in 1989 to finance the RMI. In 2017, the return of ISF amounted to €5.067bn.

Individuals who are residents in France are taxed on their worldwide assets and individuals who are residents outside France under French law are taxed on their assets in France. The tax is set for each household (married couples or partners, persons cohabiting, and minor children). The tax base includes all property, rights and values that constitute the wealth of taxpayers at 1 January of the relevant tax year (buildings built or not, individual businesses, farms, movable furniture, financial investments, debts owed to you, automobiles, aircraft, pleasure boats, ...). However, certain assets are wholly or partially exempted (mainly professional property, i.e. individual companies, rights on literary and artistic works held by the author, some rural property, objects and antiques, artwork or collectibles).

Individuals resident in France are entitled to a deduction of 30% against the value of their main home for wealth tax purposes.

A resident in France may potentially reduce wealth tax due to the restriction that applies to the amount of combined income tax, wealth tax, social charges (CSG and CRDS) and local property taxes that can be taken from one's taxable income.

This restriction is known as the Bouclier Fiscal or tax shield, and limits these taxes to no more than 50% of your taxable income.

On 6 August 2008, France enacted a law that entitles all those who have been non-resident in France for the five previous years, to exclude their non-French assets from wealth tax for the first five years of their residence in France.

While this minor tax applies only to the most wealthy of the population, and actually collects very little revenue (2% of overall tax revenue), it is very controversial. Many people on the political left consider it a symbol of solidarity, while many on the right argue that it encourages entrepreneurs to leave France. In 2018, to replace the solidarity tax on wealth, the tax on real estate wealth ("impôt sur la fortune immobilière" (IFI)) was introduced, along with a flat-rate levy of 30% on capital income, including both income tax and social security contributions. In 2022, revenue from the tax on real estate wealth will reach €1.83 billion, i.e. 1/3 of the potential revenue from the solidarity tax on wealth.

=== Succession and gift taxes ===
These taxes, known as Droits de Succession et de Donation, apply to both gifts and inheritances. The taxes apply where:

(a) The donor/deceased is resident in France at the date of the gift/death;

(b) The recipient is resident in France and has been so resident for at least 6 of the 10 tax years prior to the year in which the gift/inheritance is received; or

(c) The asset is a French asset.

These provisions can be overridden by a Tax Treaty.

Tax is payable by the recipient, based on the amount received and their relationship with the donor or deceased.

Assets passing on death between spouses and PACS partners are now exempt from French succession tax, but gifts are still taxable between spouses and PACS partners.

As for wealth tax, the value of your main home can be reduced by 30% for succession tax purposes provided the property is also occupied as a main home by the surviving spouse or by one or several children. PACS partners can also benefit from the 30% deduction.

The tax rates for 2010 are as follows:

| Taxable inheritance | To spouses and PACS partners: (gifts only) | Tax on band | Cumulative tax |
|---|---|---|---|
| Less than €7,953 | 5% | €398 | €398 |
| €7,953 to €15,697 | 10% | €774 | €1,172 |
| €15,697 to €31,395 | 15% | €2,355 | €3,527 |
| €31,395 to €544,173 | 20% | €102,556 | €106,083 |
| €544,173 to €889,514 | 30% | €103,602 | €209,685 |
| €889,514 to €1,779,029 | 35% | €311,330 | €521,015 |
| Above €1,779,029 | 40% | | |

| Taxable inheritance | In the direct line (including adopted children but not stepchildren unless adopted) | Tax on band | Cumulative Tax |
|---|---|---|---|
| Less than €7,953 | 5% | €398 | €398 |
| €7,953 to €11,930 | 10% | €398 | €796 |
| €11,930 to €15,697 | 15% | €565 | €1,361 |
| €15,697 to €544,173 | 20% | €105,695 | €107,056 |
| €544,173 to €889,514 | 30% | €103,602 | €210,658 |
| €889,514 to €1,779,029 | 35% | €311,330 | €521,988 |
| Above €1,779,029 | 40% | | |

| Taxable inheritance | Siblings | Other relatives to the 4th degree (nieces, nephews, uncles, aunts, cousins, great-aunts and uncles etc.) | More remote and non-relatives |
|---|---|---|---|
| Less than €24,069 | 35% | 55% | 60% |
| Above €24,069 | 45% | 55% | 60% |

Allowances are available, and the main ones are:

| Relationship of recipient to donor/deceased | Allowance |
|---|---|
| Inheritances: | |
| Child | €100,000 |
| Sibling | €15,697 |
| Niece/Nephew | €7,849 |
| Other | €1,570 |
| Gifts: | |
| Spouse or PACS partner | €79,533 |
| Child | €156,974 |
| Grandchild | €31,395 |
| Niece/Nephew | €7,849 |
| For inheritances and gifts, disabled persons receive an additional | €156,974 |

For example, a child can receive 100,000 * 2 = €200,000 from their parents in allowances before being taxed.

=== PACS partners ===
In France, unmarried couples (regardless of gender) can enter into a PACS (Pacte Civil de Solidarite) agreement.

The PACS is a written agreement which can now be achieved by going before a Notaire who then registers it with the authorities. The relations between the partners are similar to those of husband and wife.

A PACS can be entered into by:

- any couple living in France of whatever nationality, AND
- any couple living outside France provided at least one of them is a French national

The tax position for PACS partners is now aligned with that of a married couple. For income tax purposes, the couple is assessed to income tax as a household from the day the PACS agreement takes force.

For succession tax, the surviving PACS partner is exempt from tax on inheritances. For gifts, the allowance is now €80,724 and the tax rates are as for married couples. If a PACS agreement is broken before the end of the year following the year it was entered into, for motives other than marriage of the couple or death of one of the partners, the allowance will be denied and the tax relief clawed back.

As of 14 May 2009, France recognises most foreign Civil Partnerships as equivalent to a PACS.

=== Income taxes ===
In France there are three categories of taxes on income: the corporate tax, the income tax for individuals and taxes for social purposes (CSG and the CRDS, paid by the households). Taxes paid by employers on wages, namely social contributions, are not considered as taxes by the French central government.

==== Income tax ====
The impôt sur le revenu (IR) is a tax on all income available to individuals in a year. With certain exceptions, net income is determined from total income, whatever its origin, after applying certain deductions, and then a single scale of taxation is applied. This scale is characterized by rates applied to slices of income according to the principle of progressivity. However, there are numerous provisions, so there are many systems of taxation depending on the type of income received. In addition, some income and capital gains are subject to a fixed rate of tax. The IR is payable each year on the total taxable income of the household. In 2021, proceeds from the IR amounted to €280;bn.

The income subject to IR is divided into seven categories: industrial and commercial profits, non-commercial and agricultural profits, land income, salaries and wages, pensions and annuities, movable income, and capital gains. Individuals' total income is taxed if they are resident in France, whether they have French nationality or not. Individuals not living in France are taxed only on their income from French sources. The tax is calculated for each "fiscal household", i.e. the family unit composed of either a single person, or two partners and their children or other dependents. Whatever the nationality, a person who is a tax resident in France is taxable on their worldwide income. People not living in France are subject to limited tax on their income from French sources only.

The amount of taxable income, or "revenu fiscal de référence" (RFR), is not equal to the income received by the household in the year. Instead, the RFR is determined by dividing the income by the number of "parts" in the fiscal household (1 part for every adult, 0.5 parts for each of the first two child, and 1 part for each successive child), and then diminished further by a standard deduction and any other deductions the taxpayer may have claimed in the year.

The table below shows the percentage of income tax applicable to taxable income, or RFR (rather than gross income).

2009 Rates by units per household
| 1 Unit (=1 Adult household) | 2 Units (=2 Adults household) | 2.5 Units (=2 Adults + 1 child household) | 3 Units (=2 Adults + 2 child household) | 4 Units (=2 Adults + 3 child household) | Rate |
|---|---|---|---|---|---|
| Below €5,875 | Below €11,750 | Below €14,688 | Below €17,625 | Below €23,500 | 0% |
| From €5,875 to €11,720 | From €11,750 to €23,400 | From €14,688 to €29,300 | From €17,625 to €36,160 | From €23,500 to €46,880 | 5.5% |
| From €11,720 to €26,030 | From €23,440 to €52,060 | From €29,300 to €65,075 | From €35,160 to €78,090 | From €46,880 to €104,120 | 14% |
| From €26,030 to €69,783 | From €52,060 to €139,556 | From €65,075 to €174,448 | From €78,090 to €209,349 | From €104,120 to €279,132 | 30% |
| Beyond €69,783 | Beyond €139,556 | Beyond €174,448 | Beyond €209,132 | Beyond €279,132 | 41% |

2017 Rates per household unit
| Income per Unit | Rate |
|---|---|
| Below €9,700 | 0% |
| From €9,711 to €26,818 | 14% |
| From €26,818 to €71,898 | 30% |
| From €71,898 to €152,260 | 41% |
| Beyond €152,260 | 45% |

2022 Rates per household unit
| Income per Unit | Rate |
|---|---|
| Below €10,777 | 0% |
| From €10,778 to €27,478 | 11% |
| From €27,479 to €78,570 | 30% |
| From €78,571 to €168,994 | 41% |
| Beyond €168,995 | 45% |

Exemptions are made for social reasons. Taxpayers whose net income does not exceed €7,920 are exempted from the IR. In principle, taxable income is calculated from the income available to a fiscal household in one year. Some expenses by the household tax are deductible from total income. There can be cuts and maximum taxable amounts of the income.

The income tax is calculated by the administration based on the amounts reported by taxpayers who are required to declare their whole income earned during the previous year. But the calculation of income tax takes into account the personal situation of the taxpayer, in particular through the "family quotient" (or units in the household) on the one hand and in the allocation of reductions or tax credits to taxpayers, on the other hand. The family quotient can take into account family responsibilities and, according to them, eases the effects of progressive taxation since the progressive rate is applied to a partial income (the taxable income). This process consists of dividing the taxable income of the household tax into a number of units (or parts) equal to the number of individuals. The progressive scale of tax is then applied to taxable income per share. Finally, this partial tax is multiplied by the number of units to determine the taxable base.

The family quotient is one unit for a single person, two for a married couple, plus an extra half for each of the first two children and an additional unit for each child from the third.

There are certain limitations to the amount of tax savings that can be achieved under the parts system. If the system produces a tax bill which has been reduced by more than €2,301 (for 2009 income) per half part compared to what it would have been without reference to the parts, you are not allowed to use this system. You will always receive two parts for a married couple notwithstanding.

Various tax credits are available to set against the total tax calculated. These include tax credits for dividends, energy-saving work carried out on the main residence, purchase of an environmentally friendly car, employment of home help, child minding expenses, for filing tax returns electronically and paying tax by direct debit or electronically, for mortgage interest, among others.

==== Pay-as-you-earn tax in 2019 ====
Initially set to start in 2018, France will introduce a pay-as-you-earn scheme for the collection of the income tax in January 2019. To accommodate the progressive tax rates, which are computed on the total income and composition of the household, while preserving the privacy of employees to their employers, the administration only transmits to companies the individual tax rate to retain on their employees' paychecks.

Individuals receiving non-salary incomes must pay a monthly account on their estimated income tax by the tax administration.

==== Low earners income tax credit ====
For single people with taxable income of between 11.800 euros and 16,418 euros and couples with no children with taxable revenue between 17,454 and 25,983 euros (23,717 euros to 35,400 euros with a child), a tax credit of 480 euros for single people (960 euros for a couple) was introduced in 2013. For 2014 revenues the tax credit was increased to 1,135 euros for single people and 1,870 euros for couples. The 2023 budget law introduces a number of personal tax measures and measures to help households meet rising energy spending such as a support schemes to cope with rising energy prices (limitation of the rate increases of gas an electricity and a fuel allowance of €100 will be paid to the 10 million most modest workers who use their vehicle to go to work) and an aid for the ecological transition (an aid for the purchase of bicycles is renewed and increased in 2023, MaPrimeRénov' Serenity is strengthened and the One noNew social leasing scheme)

==== Income tax surcharge on high salaries ====
The contribution exceptionnelle sur les hauts revenus is a temporary tax introduced in 2012 by François Fillon as a measure to curb the budget deficit. For a single person the rate of the tax is 3% on income between 250,001 euros and 500,000 euros, for an income above 500,000 the rate is 4%.

==== Employer payroll tax on high salaries ====
For tax years 2013 & 2014 earnings above 1 million euros will be subject to a tax payable by the payer/employer. The tax is similar to the employer social security contributions which above 1 million euros amount to 0.22% of gross salary compared to 44% for salaries of 150,000 euros. The tax introduced by François Hollande as the 75% tax is in fact an additional employer contribution of 50% which when existing social security charges are added reaches 75%. The proposed tax was subsequently modified after being rejected by the Council of State and was implemented in 2014 in its current form and will be discontinued as of January 2015.

==== Corporate tax ====
The corporate tax, in French impot sur les societes (IS), is an annual tax in principle that affects all profits made in France by corporations and other entities. It concerns about one-third of French companies. The standard rate is 33.3% for all of their activities. In 2016, the net proceeds from corporation tax amounted to €29.9 bn. The corporate tax rate in France is gradually being reduced, with the standard rate set to be lowered to 25% for all companies by 2022. For companies with a turnover of less than €10 million, profits up to €38,120 are taxed at a reduced rate of 15%. There are also additional taxes on top of the standard corporate income tax, such as a 3.3% social contribution tax for companies with a turnover of at least €7.63 million and a corporate tax liability over a certain threshold. The taxable income is equal to the difference between gross profit and costs and deductible expenses. The gross operating profit is made by the difference between sales and costs. In addition to the gross operating profit, all income or profits made apart are normally taxable: income from the rental of property, interests, deposits and bonds. A reduced rate applies to a limited number of Long Term Capital Gains. Since 2012 a tax credit equal to 7% of total salary costs can be deducted from the gross tax due.

==== Social taxes ====
Since its creation in 1945, the Social Security is mainly financed by social contributions or "cotisations sociales", i.e. deductions from wages. The purpose of social contributions is to finance social security benefits and programs, such as health insurance, pensions, family allowances, unemployment insurance, work accident/illness compensation, and social minimums. Social contributions are typically calculated as a proportional rate on salaries, though some are also charged as a flat fee. The social security system in France is based on a principle of solidarity, where some pay more in contributions than they receive in benefits, to support those who are less well-off. Until recently, there was no wide taxation on social expenditure, contrary to most of its European partners. However, in order to find a solution to the problems of financing of the social security, governments have had to broaden its range of resources by the introduction of additional tax, notably the general social contribution (CSG) and the repayment of the debt of social security (CRDS) at a rate of 0.5%, to repay the debt of the ASSO.

Established by the Finance Act 1991, the general social contribution (CSG) is payable by individuals living in France and who benefit from the compulsory health insurance. Revenues from the CSG are allocated to social security budget, specifically to the National Family Allowance, the Solidarity Fund pension schemes and insurance. Indeed, unlike the social contributions that give those who pay a right to benefit from them, the CSG, is levied without direct compensation (like any other tax). The CSG has a very broad base as it applies in principle to earnings and income from wealth. The CSG is made up of four different bases of assessment: earned income and replacement income; income from property; investment income; gambling winnings and bets. According to the DREES (The Department of Research, Studies, Evaluation and Statistics (DREES) is the ministerial statistical service for the health and social sectors), in 2021, the CSG will have cost taxpayers more than €129.4 billion and generated revenue for the State, an increase of 4.7% compared with 2020.

The contribution to the social debt (CRDS) was created in 1996. Like the CSG, it applies to earnings and to income from wealth. It was initially established for a period of 13 years, but this time limit was abolished in 2004. The territorial scope of the CRDS is the same as the CSG: thus, CRDS is paid by individuals living in France who benefit from a compulsory insurance scheme. The rate is 0.5%. The base of the CRDS is somewhat broader than the CSG, for it includes incomes exempted from CSG such as family benefits or housing allowances. The methods of recovering the CRDS are identical to those of the CSG. CRDS is not deductible from the tax base for tax on income. The yield for the year 2012 is €6,6bn.

In summary, the social charges are made up of four elements: the CSG, CRDS, PS and RSA. The amounts are different for each type of income, and the position can be summarized below:

| | Salaries and unemployment benefits (on 98.25% of gross) | Retirement or Disability Pensions (on 95% of gross) | Investments, annuities, rental income and capital gains |
|---|---|---|---|
| CSG (Contribution sociale généralisée) | 9.2% | 6.6% | 8.2% |
| CRDS (Contribution au remboursement de la dette sociale) | 0.5% | 0.5% | 0.5% |
| PS (Prélèvement Sociale Contribution additionelle) | 0% | 0% | 3.4% |
| RSA (Revenu de solidarité active) | | | 1.1% |
| Total | 9.7% | 7.1% | 13.2% |

There are no allowances on reliefs other than being able to deduct a proportion of the social charges payable on income taxed at the scale rates against earned or pension income. Thus, where income or gains are taxed at fixed rates, no deduction is available.

=== Local taxes ===
There are a huge number of local taxes. The most important are the direct taxes. The local direct taxes are the oldest taxes in the French tax system, as they succeed to direct contributions that were created in 1790 and 1791 as taxes collected by the central government then transferred to local authorities upon the tax reform of 1917. Local taxes are levied by the state for local authorities (regions, departments, municipalities, local public institutions). There are six main direct taxes (the council tax on second home; the property tax on built-up properties (TFPB); the propert tax on non-built properties (TFPNB); the annual tax on vacant accommodation (TLV) and council tax on vacant accommodation (THLV); the tax on the sale of bare land made suitable for building; the tax or fee for household waste collection (TEOM or REOM)). The rates are set by the territorial assemblies (regional or municipal councils) when they vote their annual budget. However, rates can not exceed certain limits set by the state. The tax bases are established by the state. There are many permanent or temporary exemptions. The revenue from local taxes amounted to €173bn in 2022 (6.6% of GDP). Apart from these four main taxes, there are many other taxes. Direct taxes include the taxe pour frais de chambres d'agriculture (expense of the chambers of agriculture), the taxe d'enlèvement des ordures ménagères (garbage collection), and the taxe sur les pylônes. Indirect taxes are taxes applying to spring water, mines, spectacles, advertising, navigation, electricity, pollution and workplace.

==== Professional tax ====
The professional tax (taxe professionnelle) is due each year by legal persons or natural persons who are self-employed in France. Various exemptions are provided (activities performed by the State, local authorities and public institutions, business and agricultural organizations, etc.). The tax base is constituted by the rental value of assets available to the taxpayer. This is then subject to discounts or rebates. The amount of business tax is calculated by multiplying the taxable net by the rates approved by each local beneficiaries. The rates are set by the local communities and organizations, within limits set by national legislation. In 2021, the amount of revenue collected through corporate taxes was €74bn.

==== Residence tax ====
The residence tax (taxe d'habitation) applies to all buildings sufficiently furnished and their dependencies (gardens, garages, private car parks): the tax is payable by any person who has a residential unit at one's disposal, for any reason (owner, renter, occupant for free), on 1 January of the taxable year. The tax base is a notional rental value of the residential property. In 2017, the revenue from the housing taxes amounted to €22,575bn.

==== Land tax ====
The property tax on built lands (taxe foncière) is applied to properties built in France. The taxable properties consist of all permanent constructions, i.e. buildings (blocks of flats, houses, workshops, warehouses, etc.). The tax base is equal to 50% of the notional rental value of the building (i.e. the value set by the tax administration) and on land/location value. There are many exemptions and exceptions. In 2018, the product amounted to €42 bn.

== Taxes by source ==
Structure of the taxation by administration

Structure of the taxation in France by source

In 2022, revenues amounted to 46.1% of GDP.

There are five beneficiaries of the tax revenues: in 2017, the "cotisations sociales" received the biggest percentage : 37%, social security administrations have received 17% of it; the state and the central government bodies 32%; the local administrations (APUL) 14%; the European Union (EU) less than 1%. Direct and indirect taxes account for 46.1% of GDP in 2022. State resources come almost entirely from taxes. The social security bodies are financed largely by social contributions but also by taxes, including the general social contribution (CSG) and the contribution for the repayment of the social debt (CRDS). Local administrations are mostly financed by the four main local direct taxes (housing tax, property taxes and business tax).

Funding of each administration by source in 2007 in%
| Administration | Direct taxes | Indirect taxes | Social contributions |
|---|---|---|---|
| Central government | 39.5 | 57.6 | 3.0 |
| Quasi-autonomous non-governmental organization | 54.5 | 45.5 | 0 |
| Social Security Administration | 19.8 | 9 | 71.2 |
| Local government | 62.3 | 37.7 | 0 |
| Total charges | 27.1 | 35.7 | 37.2 |

Funds for each administration in 2007
| public administration | in billion € | % of the total | % of the GDP |
|---|---|---|---|
| Central government | 292.5 | 37.9 | 17.1 |
| Social Security | 360.1 | 47,9 | 21,1 |
| Local & Regional government | 95.2 | 12,7 | 5,6 |
| European Union | 4.5 | 0,6 | 0,3 |
| Total | 752.2 | 100,0 | 44,0 |

== Public finances ==
The public deficit amounted to 5,5% of the GDP (€50.6 billion) in 2023 compared to 2,8% on average in the euro zone, excluding France. According to the 2024 PSTAB, France's public deficit should fall back below 3% in 2027. At the end of the third quarter of 2023, public debt in the Maastricht sense stood at €3,088.2on, an increase of €41. 3bn, after + €34.5bn in the previous quarter. Expressed as percentage of gross domestic product (GDP), it stood at 111.7%, as in the second quarter of 2023. As in the previous quarter, the increase in public debt was accompanied by a fall in the general government cash position (-€17.3 bn), with the result that net debt rose by more than gross debt (+€61.0 bn) to 102.9% of GDP.

The deficit of social security administrations remains at €10,8;bn in 2023, but the corresponding debt ("social debt") has increased (€8,8bn in 2023). The deficit of local administrations is still limited, but amounted to €10bn in 2023, as a result of a spending growth significantly higher than that of the revenue in the recent years. As for the net tax revenue of the central government, net tax receipts amount to €38.6bn compared with €31.1bn at the end of February 2023, an increase of €7.5bn, because of increasing transfers of revenues to social security and local authorities to reduce their deficit. By 2022, public spending in France will have risen to €1,536bn, equivalent to 58.2 points of GDP. The public deficit for 2023 is €154.0bn, or 5.5% of gross domestic product (GDP). Although deficits have been commonplace, efforts have been made in recent years to cut back the growth of taxes and government spending. Deficit reduction became a top priority of the government when France committed to the European Monetary Union. The Maastricht Treaty targets for the EMU required the members countries to reduce the government's budget deficit to 3% of GDP and the public debt to 60% of GDP.

== Recent evolution ==
Evolution of the structure of the taxation in France by public administration since 1980

The evolution of the level of the tax burden since the early 1970s can be divided into three distinct phases. First, during the 70s and in the first half of the 1980s, the tax rate increased from 34% to 42%. Then it stabilized at a rate close to 42% until the early 1990s, when it resumed its growth rate to the historical height of 44.9% in 1999. Since then, the rate of PO government has declined slightly to between 43% and 47% of the GDP.

Over the last decades, the distribution of tax burden between the three main administrations has changed significantly. The share allocated to the state has tended to decline, while that allocated to the social security institutions and local governments has grown. The higher tax rate of social security is due to the general upward trend of social spending, particularly the higher spending on pension and health insurance systems. In 2021, the public spending on pensions represented 13.8 percent of the GDP, compared with 11.67 percent in 2002.

Funding of the Social Security
| Source | 1978 | 1991 | 2007 | 2014 |
|---|---|---|---|---|
| Contributions | 97% | 95% | 72% | 63.5% |
| Taxes among which CSG | 3% - | 5% 2% | 28% 19% | 36.5% 16.1% |

In this context, the structure of the funding of the social security administrations has been more and more assured by taxes rather than social contributions. In particular, new taxes were levied to help fund the social security administrations, such as the general social contribution (CSG) and the contribution for the repayment of the social debt (CRDS). More recently, the central government has helped to fund the social security administrations by the revenues from the excise on alcohol and tobacco, in part to offset reductions in social contributions. As for the growth of the revenues for the benefit of local administrations, it is only due to the devolution, begun with the 1992 laws, and continued with the reforms in 2003.

== History of taxes in France ==
The tax system has never been united in France. There have always been an extreme diversity in collection, the base, the rates and the nature of the taxes. Until 1789, taxes were collected by the state, the church and lords. After the French revolution, taxes consisted of taxes on wealth and on incomes. The current tax system was shaped during the 20th century. All taxes created under the French Revolution were abolished, the last being the patentes, abolished in 1974. Whereas taxation aimed at assuring "the maintenance of the public force" and "the expenditures of the administrations"(Déclaration des droits de l'homme et du citoyen de 1789), taxation is now aiming at assuring efficient public services and a fair distribution of the wealth and the income.

Historically, most taxes have been paid either or in shares of harvest (dime and champart) or work (corvée, military service). Gradually, each of these taxes has been replaced by a cash contribution for being more convenient for both the beneficiary and the taxpayer. The taille, created in the 14th century, was one of the oldest taxes levied by the French monarchy. It was replaced by the fouage. Under the Old Regime, the collection of taxes was leased, i.e. that the state entrusted the task to entrepreneurs, big farmers, who paid the amount of the tax to be levied, then levied the tax for themselves. The system was convenient for both the state (the revenue was anticipated and it was disposed of the unpopularity of tax collectors) and for big farmers (the bargain was very profitable). However, the people considered the collection mainly a source of injustice and excesses.

Some notable indirect taxes under the Old Regime were the aides (indirect taxes collected by the state, applying to beverages), the banalités (tax imposed by the lords for the use of mills, ovens and wine presses), the casuel (collected by the Church at baptisms, marriages and funerals), the cens (tax collected by the lords, for the use of their land), the champart (collected by the lords, paid by an amount of the crops of grains), the dîme (collected by the church, applying to all the lands), the gabelle (collected by the king, for the consumption of salt), the minage (collected by the king or the lords, for the sales of grains at fairs and markets). There were three direct taxes, created between the 15th and the 18th centuries: the taille, the capitation and the dixième. The taille, created in the 15th century and used for more than three centuries, applied to incomes from non-privileged people from ownership, housing, farm land and breeding. The capitation, created in 1695, was a tax on social status that taxed everyone, however, for those subject to the taille the capitation was an addition to the taille. The dixième, created in 1710, applied to all the income from any ownership (land, real estate, annuities), at a rate of 10% (dixieme meaning tenth). In 1749, it was replaced by the vingtième (twentieth, i.e. a tax with a rate of 5%).

The French Revolution transformed the tax system completely. The former system was abolished. The parliament, on behalf of the people, took control of the right to levy taxes (the sovereign loses this right), destroyed all statutes and tax privileges (of the nobility and clergy, but also the provinces, cities, corporations, etc.) planned to establish a fair proportional contribution and made these changes official in the Declaration of Human Rights and the Citizen of 1789. Four direct taxes were created in the late 18th century, applying only to wealth: the land contribution, the housing contribution, the patentes (industry and trade), and the contribution from doors and windows.

Throughout the 19th century, taxes changed little. Taxes from the Revolution remained, i.e. taxes on wealth (Impôt sur la fortune) on the professional activity (the patente, ancestor of the taxe professionnelle), and many indirect taxes and "droits" applied to the trade of goods (inheritance, purchase of real estate). From the middle of the 19th century, there were debates for the creation of an income tax, proposed by Proudhon in 1848, then by Gambetta in 1869. In 1872, a tax on incomes from real estate was created. In 1876, Gambetta proposed to create a proportional tax on all incomes. The only result is the creation in 1896 of a tax on incomes from the stock exchange.

Before 1914, taxes mainly applied to the wealth (wealth, land, inheritance) or incomes from wealth. The tax burden did not exceed 10%. Many propositions, successively from Doumer, Cavaignac and Waldeck-Rousseau, failed, due to the opposition of the right. It was the Great War which gave the opportunity to create a tax on income, in 1917, thanks to Joseph Caillaux, the minister of Finances. At the same time, the four contributions created in 1790 and 1791 were turned into local taxes, and replaced by the income tax as the main national tax.

After the Second World War, the tax system underwent a certain number of reforms aiming at modernizing and adapting it. The income tax was adapted and old contributions abolished. A family quotient was created in 1945. The business tax was created in 1948, reformed in 1959. Finally, the last significant innovation in technical terms, the VAT was introduced in 1954. Then the French example was adopted gradually in most developed countries. The French tax system is currently controversial with the development of the European Union and globalization. Tax competition has risen sharply, and it becomes necessary to take into account the legal possibilities to avoid paying taxes (the practice of expatriation is legal, unlike tax evasion).

== See also ==
- Budget of France
- Government of France
- Economy of France
