= List of countries by GDP (PPP) per capita =

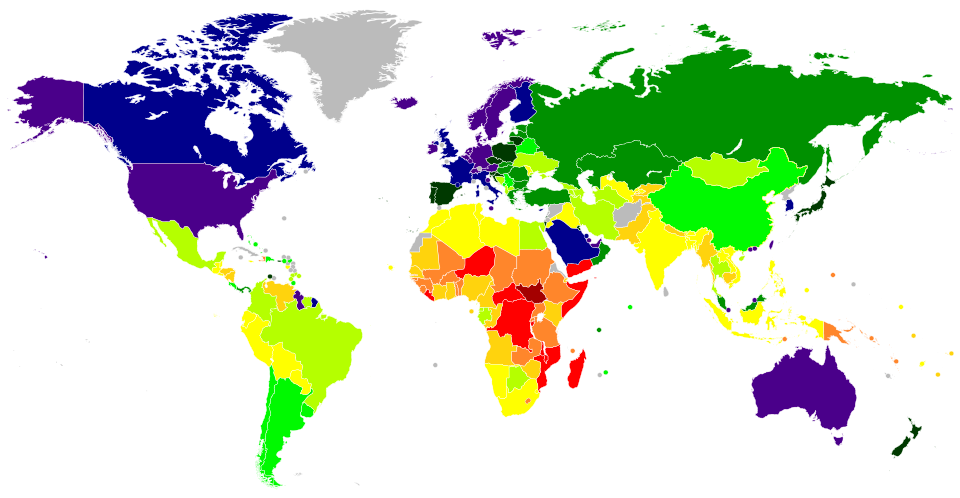
Countries or territories by GDP (PPP) per capita in 2026: >$70,000 $60,000–70,000 $50,000–60,000 $40,000–50,000 $30,000–40,000 $20,000–30,000 / $10,000–20,000 $5,000–10,000 $2,500–5,000 $1,000–2,500 <$1,000 No data

A country's gross domestic product (GDP) at purchasing power parity (PPP) per capita is the PPP value of all final goods and services produced within an economy in a given year, divided by the average (or mid-year) population for the same year. This is similar to nominal GDP per capita but adjusted for the cost of living in each country.

In 2026, the estimated average GDP per capita (PPP) of all of the countries was $25,591. (Note: There have been no exclusive estimates for the world average by the IMF. 2023 calculations are based on the global GDP (PPP), and population estimates by the IMF.) For rankings regarding wealth, see list of countries by wealth per adult.

== Method ==
The gross domestic product (GDP) per capita figures on this page are derived from PPP calculations. Such calculations are prepared by various organizations, including the IMF and the World Bank. As estimates and assumptions have to be made, the results produced by different organizations for the same country are not hard facts and tend to differ, sometimes substantially, so they should be used with caution.

Comparisons of national wealth are frequently made based on nominal GDP and savings (not just income), which do not reflect differences in the cost of living in different countries (see List of countries by GDP (nominal) per capita); hence, using a PPP basis is arguably more useful when comparing generalized differences in living standards between economies because PPP takes into account the relative cost of living and the inflation rates of the countries, rather than using only exchange rates, which may distort the real differences in income.

This is why GDP (PPP) per capita is considered one of the indicators of a country's standard of living, The relation between GDP per capita and standard of living has been criticized. Alternative measures of standard of living include list of countries by average wage, median income and disposable household and per capita income. GDP (PPP) and GDP (PPP) per capita are usually measured by international dollar, which is a hypothetical currency that has the same purchasing power in every economy as the U.S. dollar in the United States. The share of the shadow economy is significant in many European countries, ranging from less than 10 to over 40% of GDP. Since 2014, EU member states have been encouraged by Eurostat, the official statistics body, to include some illegal activities.

== Table ==
=== Main table ===
All figures are in current international dollars, and rounded to the nearest whole number. The table initially ranks each country or territory with their latest available year's estimates, and can be re-ranked by any of the sources.

* Nearly all country links in the table connect to articles titled "Income in (country or territory)" or to "Economy of (country or territory)".

GDP per capita (current international dollar) by country or territory, non-sovereign state or non-IMF member
Country / territory	IMF (2026)	World Bank (Note: The following countries are from 2022 data: San Marino and U.S. Virgin Islands) (2025 or 2024)	CIA (Note: The following countries are from 2022 data: San Marino and U.S. Virgin Islands) (2023 or 2024)
Monaco *	—N/a	—N/a	270,100
Liechtenstein *	198,987	—N/a	210,600
Singapore *	176,927	163,454	132,600
Luxembourg *	156,638	155,089	128,200
Ireland *	149,642	155,089	115,300
Macau *	141,442	137,031	112,800
Norway *	116,169	116,168	91,100
Switzerland *	106,944	102,513	82,000
Qatar *	103,804	128,883	110,900
Bermuda *	—N/a	118,728	105,300
Taiwan *	103,743	—N/a	32,300
Guyana *	98,912	97,899	70,300
Brunei *	98,028	90,007	79,200
United States *	95,212	90,027	75,500
Denmark *	92,876	83,218	73,700
Cayman Islands *	—N/a	86,689	78,100
Netherlands *	88,202	87,320	70,900
San Marino *	87,524	75,942	70,900
Hong Kong *	85,843	75,216	66,200
United Arab Emirates *	83,704	79,344	68,600
Iceland *	83,002	83,431	65,600
Malta *	80,020	72,211	60,500
Faroe Islands *	—N/a	78,165	70,400
Belgium *	78,906	74,676	63,100
Austria *	78,828	76,778	63,300
Germany *	78,664	75,407	62,800
Sweden *	78,476	72,529	63,300
Andorra *	76,288	79,567	65,900
Australia *	75,039	71,934	60,100
Saudi Arabia *	74,295	71,243	62,700
Canada *	70,374	66,746	56,700
Finland *	70,254	65,885	55,600
South Korea *	70,251	63,125	50,400
France *	68,852	63,975	54,500
European Union * (Note: The EU is included because it is much more than a free-trade association like ASEAN, NAFTA, or Mercosur. -- See: "The World Factbook". CIA. 2014. Archived from the original on 11 June 2020. "Although the EU is not a federation in the strict sense, it is far more than a free-trade association such as ASEAN, NAFTA, or Mercosur, and it has certain attributes associated with independent nations: its flag, currency (for some members), and law-making abilities, as well as diplomatic representation and a common foreign and security policy in its dealings with external partners. Thus, the inclusion of basic intelligence on the EU has been deemed appropriate as a new, separate entity in The World Factbook." -- However, because the EU is an organization and not a sovereign state, it does not receive a ranking in this list.)	68,514	62,266	54,300
United Kingdom *	68,476	64,607	52,500
Cyprus * (Note: Data is for the area controlled by the Government of the Republic of Cyprus.)	68,256	61,240	53,300
Italy *	66,221	62,803	53,100
Czech Republic *	64,071	60,487	48,000
Bahrain *	63,736	70,997	59,100
Slovenia *	62,255	59,244	48,500
Lithuania *	61,229	56,838	47,200
Spain *	60,106	59,868	48,400
Israel *	60,100	59,717	47,300
Poland *	60,051	54,262	45,100
Japan *	59,712	55,422	46,100
Aruba *	59,260	44,967	40,500
New Zealand *	58,563	57,350	48,200
Croatia *	54,512	50,946	42,600
Puerto Rico *	53,917	52,196	44,100
Estonia *	53,660	52,106	41,507
Portugal *	52,980	53,145	41,900
Russia *	52,602	49,568	41,700
Sint Maarten (Dutch part) *	—N/a	56,491	45,800
Hungary *	51,028	49,838	40,700
Slovakia *	49,761	49,309	40,300
Romania *	49,628	50,895	40,600
U.S. Virgin Islands *	—N/a	49,793	46,500
Kazakhstan *	48,351	44,294	35,900
Malaysia *	47,453	41,498	34,100
Greece *	47,365	45,264	37,800
Bahamas *	47,248	41,258	36,200
Panama *	47,129	43,902	36,400
Turkey *	46,679	45,288	35,300
Kuwait *	46,552	56,468	45,400
Oman *	46,196	42,295	36,700
Latvia *	46,063	46,137	38,900
Bulgaria *	44,603	44,451	34,100
Uruguay *	39,008	38,315	32,000
Maldives *	37,791	24,809	23,400
Seychelles *	37,183	35,854	29,200
Chile *	37,008	37,774	30,200
Trinidad and Tobago *	36,688	37,121	31,700
Montenegro *	36,564	35,422	27,900
Belarus *	36,025	33,006	29,000
Mauritius *	35,434	33,667	27,300
Saint Kitts and Nevis *	35,192	36,777	31,300
Serbia *	35,186	33,910	26,900
Costa Rica *	34,214	33,815	27,000
Antigua and Barbuda *	32,999	35,833	29,600
Argentina *	32,899	32,587	26,500
Georgia * (Note: Excludes data for Abkhazia and South Ossetia.)	32,661	29,414	25,000
Dominican Republic *	32,597	28,721	24,200
North Macedonia *	32,009	28,029	24,500
China * (Note: IMF and CIA figures exclude Taiwan and the special administrative regions of Hong Kong and Macau.) (Note: World Bank figures exclude the special administrative regions of Hong Kong and Macau.)	31,786	29,333	23,800
Curaçao *	—N/a	30,716	
Saint Lucia *	29,573	28,674	24,300
Albania *	28,819	28,221	18,900
Thailand *	27,724	26,250	21,700
Armenia *	26,916	24,754	20,100
Azerbaijan *	26,786	26,113	22,100
Mexico *	26,743	25,869	22,000
Barbados *	26,339	25,894	19,900
Gabon *	26,224	22,218	18,900
World (Note: There is no explicit "GDP (PPP) per capita" World estimate provided by the IMF. For this figure, the GDP (PPP) world value has been divided by the global population according to the IMF.)	25,591	24,248	21,300
Brazil *	24,594	23,433	19,600
Turkmenistan *	24,401	20,408	18,000
Turks and Caicos Islands *	—N/a	24,820	33,400
Bosnia and Herzegovina *	24,355	25,814	20,400
Paraguay *	23,662	20,181	16,300
Suriname *	23,697	22,067	19,400
Colombia *	23,634	22,640	18,500
Egypt *	23,624	20,204	16,800
Grenada *	23,278	20,167	17,700
Mongolia *	22,428	20,798	16,800
Ukraine * (Note: Figures exclude the Autonomous Republic of Crimea and Sevastopol.)	22,229	18,905	16,300
Botswana *	22,135	20,698	18,100
Saint Vincent and the Grenadines *	21,737	22,799	18,700
Kosovo *	21,640	19,263	16,400
Moldova * (Note: Excludes data for Transnistria.)	21,182	19,996	16,500
Palau *	20,860	23,051	15,800
Dominica *	20,693	22,713	18,700
Bhutan *	20,335	16,254	14,600
Peru *	20,238	18,816	15,700
Iran *	20,159	19,699	16,200
Vietnam *	19,974	18,089	14,400
Algeria *	19,719	18,586	15,400
Indonesia *	19,091	17,660	14,500
Equatorial Guinea *	18,880	16,133	15,500
Sri Lanka *	18,246	17,065	13,800
Libya *	18,224	16,521	12,300
Ecuador *	17,831	16,757	13,900
Fiji *	17,139	16,337	14,100
South Africa *	16,841	15,906	13,600
Guatemala *	16,102	15,197	12,600
Tunisia *	16,022	15,234	12,700
Belize *	15,613	14,966	13,300
El Salvador *	15,077	14,101	11,700
Uzbekistan *	14,421	13,601	10,500
Jamaica *	14,148	13,291	10,300
Philippines *	13,642	12,577	10,400
Cape Verde * (Note: Referred to as "Cabo Verde".)	13,466	11,262	9,900
Eswatini *	13,394	12,529	10,400
Jordan *	13,328	12,631	9,500
Iraq *	13,007	14,267	12,700
India *	12,998	11,748	9,800
Bolivia *	12,736	12,873	9,800
Namibia *	12,513	11,986	10,300
Morocco * (Note: Includes Western Sahara.)	12,425	10,305	9,100
Nauru *	12,374	14,326	12,600
Laos *	12,054	9,788	8,600
Lebanon *	—N/a	12,575	11,300
Bangladesh *	10,884	9,646	8,500
Angola *	10,713	8,348	7,300
Kyrgyzstan *	10,342	8,009	7,000
Nicaragua *	10,256	8,709	7,700
Djibouti *	10,062	7,776	6,800
Nigeria *	10,051	6,440	5,700
Venezuela *	9,902	—N/a	4,900
Ghana *	9,242	8,027	7,100
Mauritania *	9,227	7,271	6,400
Pakistan *	8,978	6,287	5,500
Cambodia *	8,870	7,970	7,000
Ivory Coast *	8,694	7,654	6,700
Samoa *	8,672	7,837	6,900
Tonga *	8,635	7,852	7,100
Zimbabwe *	8,499	3,921	3,500
Honduras *	8,269	7,486	6,600
Kenya *	8,036	6,619	5,800
Guinea *	8,011	4,579	4,000
Marshall Islands *	7,962	8,198	7,200
Tuvalu *	7,140	6,151	5,800
Congo *	6,820	7,026	6,200
Tajikistan *	6,727	5,406	4,800
Nepal *	6,615	5,736	5,000
São Tomé and Príncipe *	6,501	6,230	5,500
Federated States of Micronesia *	6,482	4,346	3,800
Cameroon *	6,034	5,592	4,900
Palestine (Note: Referred to as "West Bank and Gaza" in the IMF and World Bank reports.) (Note: CIA registers 2 separate entries for Palestine: "West Bank" and "Gaza Strip". Figures for West Bank include the Gaza Strip -- see "The World Factbook - West Bank". CIA.gov. 15 November 2022. Archived from the original on 6 January 2021.)	5,612	4,371	3,800
Senegal *	5,565	5,110	4,500
Timor-Leste *	5,288	4,758	4,200
Myanmar * (Note: Referred to as "Burma".)	5,283	5,980	5,300
Benin *	5,181	4,435	3,900
Ethiopia *	4,996	3,278	2,900
Papua New Guinea *	4,923	4,889	4,300
Syria *	—N/a	4,650	4,200
Rwanda *	4,652	3,711	3,300
Zambia *	4,650	4,224	3,700
Tanzania *	4,447	4,220	3,700
Togo *	4,275	3,239	2,800
Comoros *	4,194	4,055	3,600
Uganda *	4,158	3,276	2,900
Vanuatu *	4,141	3,602	3,200
Kiribati *	3,933	3,702	3,300
Sierra Leone *	3,933	1,847	3,100
Gambia *	3,887	3,445	3,000
Mali *	3,684	3,308	2,900
Guinea-Bissau *	3,513	3,053	2,700
Chad *	3,433	2,961	2,600
Lesotho *	3,325	2,998	2,600
Burkina Faso *	3,241	2,896	2,500
Haiti *	3,006	2,999	2,800
Solomon Islands *	2,728	2,872	2,500
Sudan *	2,576	2,127	1,900
Afghanistan *	—N/a	2,201	2,000
Niger *	2,211	2,015	1,800
Central African Republic *	2,170	1,263	1,100
DR Congo *	2,138	1,710	1,500
Madagascar *	2,124	1,884	1,700
Liberia *	2,113	1,884	1,700
Somalia *	1,976	1,600	1,400
Malawi *	1,819	1,859	1,600
Mozambique *	1,721	1,670	1,500
South Sudan *	1,582	—N/a	400
Yemen *	1,571	—N/a	200
Burundi *	1,036	950	800

=== Other territories ===
GDP per capita (current international dollar) by territory, non-sovereign state or non-IMF member
Territory	CIA	
Territory	Estimate	Year
Monaco *	270,100	2024
Liechtenstein *	210,600	2024
Isle of Man *	84,600	2014
Greenland *	71,000	2023
Falkland Islands *	70,800	2015
Gibraltar *	61,700	2014
Jersey *	56,600	2016
Guernsey *	52,500	2014
Saint Pierre and Miquelon *	46,200	2006
British Virgin Islands *	40,500	2024
Guam *	35,600	2016
New Caledonia *	34,600	2024
Anguilla *	31,000	2024
Cook Islands *	29,800	2024
Northern Mariana Islands *	24,500	2016
Cuba *	23,700	2024
French Polynesia *	23,300	2024
Saint Martin (French part) *	19,300	2005
Montserrat *	19,300	2024
American Samoa *	11,200	2016
Niue *	11,100	2021
Saint Helena, Ascension and Tristan da Cunha	7,800	2010
Tokelau *	6,004	2017
Wallis and Futuna *	3,800	2004
Eritrea *	700	2024
North Korea *	600	2023

== Distorted GDP-per-capita for tax havens ==
There are many natural economic reasons for GDP-per-capita to vary between jurisdictions (e.g. places rich in oil and gas tend to have high GDP-per-capita figures). However, it is increasingly being recognized that tax havens, or corporate tax havens, have distorted economic data which produces artificially high, or inflated, GDP-per-capita figures. It is estimated that over 15% of global jurisdictions are tax havens (see tax haven lists). An IMF investigation estimates that circa 40% of global foreign direct investment flows, which heavily influence the GDP of various jurisdictions, are described as "phantom" transactions.

A stunning $12 trillion—almost 40 per cent of all foreign direct investment positions globally—is completely artificial: it consists of financial investment passing through empty corporate shells with no real activity. These investments in empty corporate shells almost always pass through well-known tax havens. The eight major pass-through economies—the Netherlands, Luxembourg, Hong Kong SAR, the British Virgin Islands, Bermuda, the Cayman Islands, Ireland, and Singapore—host more than 85 per cent of the world's investment in special purpose entities, which are often set up for tax reasons.

— "Piercing the Veil", International Monetary Fund, June 2018

In 2017, Ireland's economic data became so distorted by U.S. multinational tax avoidance strategies (see leprechaun economics), also known as BEPS actions, that Ireland effectively abandoned GDP (and GNP) statistics as credible measures of its economy, and created a replacement statistic called modified gross national income (or GNI*). Ireland is one of the world's largest corporate tax havens.

Ireland has, more or less, stopped using GDP to measure its economy. And on current trends [because Irish GDP is distorting EU-28 aggregate data], the eurozone taken as a whole may need to consider something similar.

— Brad Setser, Council on Foreign Relations, "Ireland exports its Leprechaun", 25 April 2018

The statistical distortions created by the impact on the Irish National Accounts of the global assets and activities of a handful of large multinational corporations have now become so large as to make a mockery of conventional uses of Irish GDP.

— Patrick Honohan, ex-Governor of the Central Bank of Ireland, 13 July 2016

A list of the top 15 GDP-per-capita countries from 2016 to 2017, contains most of the major global tax havens (see GDP-per-capita tax haven proxy for more detail):

International Monetary Fund (2017)
World Bank (2016)

Rank	Country/Territory	Type
1	Qatar	Oil & Gas
—	Macau	Tax haven (Sink OFC)
2	Luxembourg	Top 10 Tax haven (Sink OFC)
3	Singapore	Top 10 Tax haven (Conduit OFC)
4	Brunei	Oil & Gas
5	Ireland	Top 10 Tax haven (Conduit OFC)
6	Norway	Oil & Gas
7	Kuwait	Oil & Gas
8	United Arab Emirates	Oil & Gas
9	Switzerland	Top 10 Tax Haven (Conduit OFC)
—	Hong Kong	Top 10 Tax Haven (Sink OFC)
10	San Marino	Tax haven (Sink OFC)
11	United States	59,495
12	Saudi Arabia	Oil & Gas
13	Netherlands	Top 10 Tax Haven (Conduit OFC)
14	Iceland	52,150
15	Bahrain	Oil & Gas

Rank	Country/Territory	Type
1	Qatar	Oil & Gas
2	Luxembourg	Top 10 Tax haven (Sink OFC)
—	Macau	Tax haven (Sink OFC)
3	Singapore	Top 10 Tax haven (Conduit OFC)
4	Brunei	Oil & Gas
5	United Arab Emirates	Oil & Gas
6	Ireland	Top 10 Tax haven (Conduit OFC)
7	Switzerland	Top 10 Tax haven (Conduit OFC)
8	Norway	Oil & Gas
—	Hong Kong	Top 10 Tax haven (Sink OFC)
9	United States	57,467
10	Saudi Arabia	Oil & Gas
11	Iceland	51,399
12	Netherlands	Top 10 Tax haven (Conduit OFC)
13	Austria	50,078
14	Denmark	49,496
15	Sweden	49,175

== See also ==
- Big Mac Index – Economic index published by The Economist
- Government spending – Government consumptions, investments, and transfer payments
- List of countries by GDP (nominal)
- List of countries by GDP (nominal) per capita
- List of countries by GDP (PPP)
- List of countries by GNI (PPP) per capita
- List of countries by past and projected GDP (PPP) per capita
- List of countries by real GDP per capita growth
- List of countries by Real gross national income per capita
- Quality of life – Degree of individual well-being
