= Income in Russia =

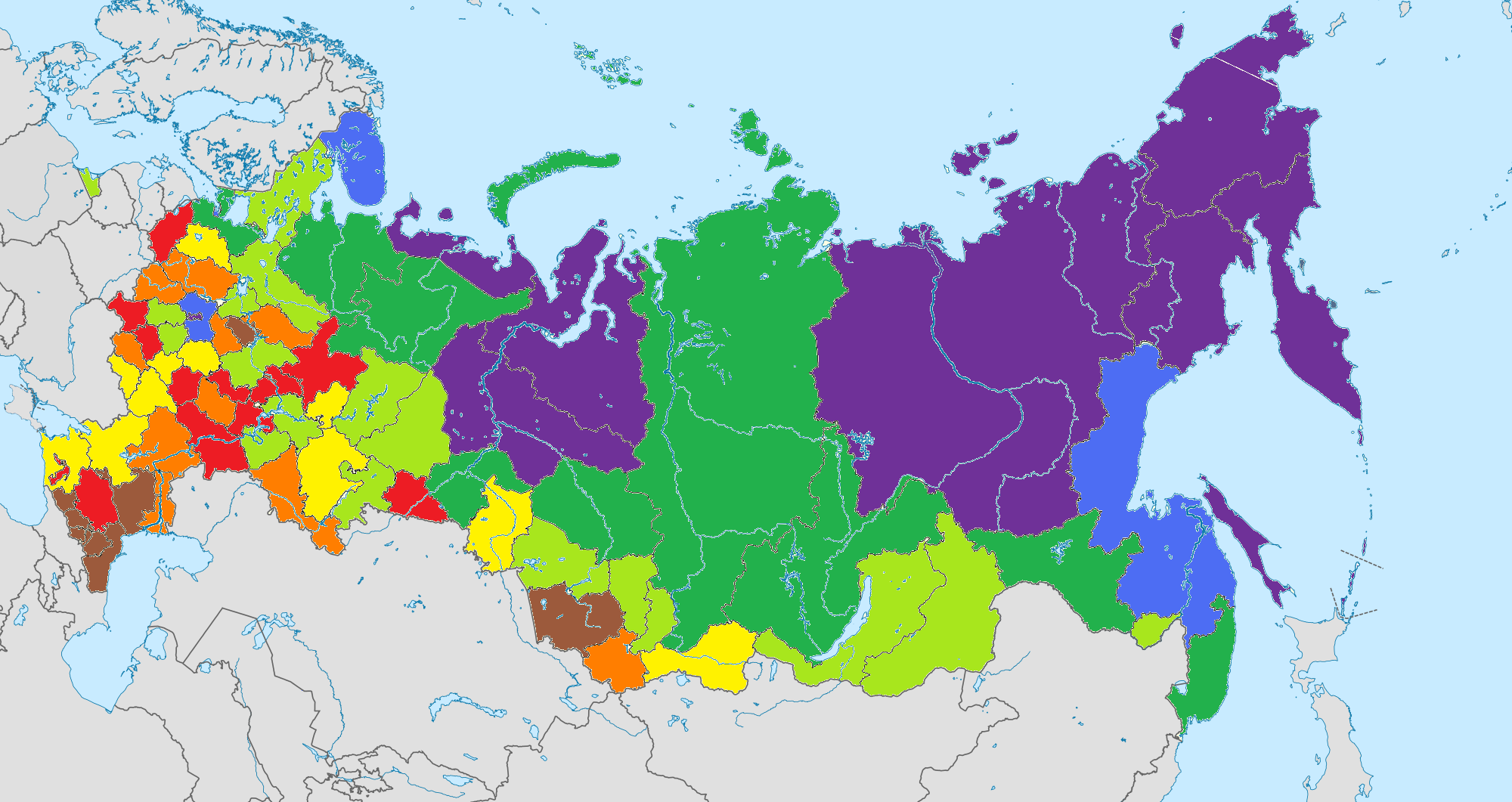
Median monthly salary in rubles by region in April 2019: >50 000 40 000 — 50 000 32 900 — 40 000 30 000 — 32 900 / 26 000 — 30 000 24 000 — 26 000 22 000 — 24 000 <22 000

Since 2020 in Russia, for incomes of the population, the median per capita income is calculated, based on the size of which the subsistence rate and the minimum wage are also calculated.

== Median salary ==
The median salary is an indicator, more and less than which the same number of people in the country receive. This indicator more accurately reflects the situation than the average monthly salary. So, according to Sberindex in 2020, the median salary for all industries in Russia amounted to 31,540 rubles in January and 38278 rubles in December. In January 2021, it amounted to 33,549 rubles, and in December 2021 - 42,801 rubles. In January 2022, the median salary was 37429 rubles, in December 2022 - 49627 rubles. According to information provided by expert channels, inflation in Russia was 13.7% in September 2022. Russia ranked 45th in the world in terms of annual inflation. Its neighbors in the rating were Chile - also 13.7% and Mongolia - 13.8%. During the survey in 2022, it turned out that two-thirds of Russians (66%) rule out the possibility that they will take out a loan to purchase a home in the near future - a mortgage. In their opinion, the reasons are low salaries and high mortgage rates. In January 2023, the median salary was 43,500 rubles. The median salary in Russia in February 2023 was 42,024 rubles.

== Other income statistics ==
According to a selective study by Rosstat for April 2021, the average accrued (gross) salary in Russia amounted to 56,280 rubles.

According to official data from Rosstat, the average income of the population of Russia in 2020 was 35,361 rubles per month, the monthly average wage was 51,083 rubles, and the average pension was 14,986 rubles. The total amount of cash income of the population of Russia in 2020 amounted to 62 trillion rubles.

According to official data from Rosstat, as of September 2021, the average wage in Russia was 54,687 rubles. At the same time, the number of the population with incomes below the poverty level (11,908 rubles per month) by the end of 2021 amounted to about 11% (more than 16 million people), and during the year it was in the range of 8.5-14, 2%, calculated by Rosstat using the new methodology. From January 1, 2022, the minimum wage in Russia is set at 13,890 rubles.

== Income breakdown ==
The main types of income of the population of Russia are wages (including hidden) - 66%, social benefits - 19%, business income - 8%, property income - 5%, and other income - 2% (according to data for 2018).

The structure of the use of incomes of the population of the Russian Federation: purchase of goods and services - 75%, mandatory payments, and various contributions - 12%, savings - 8%, purchase of foreign currency - 4%, increase in money in the hands of the population - 2% (according to data for 2017). According to the OECD, in 2018, on average, 30% of citizens' incomes were spent only on food, and another 23.4% on housing and communal services, clothes and shoes, communications and travel.

== See also ==
- List of Russian federal subjects by average wage

== Sources ==
- Овчарова Л. Н., Бирюкова С. С., Попова Д. О., Варданян Е. Г. Уровень и профиль бедности в России: от 1990-х годов до наших дней / Центр анализа доходов и уровня жизни Института управления социальными проблемами НИУ ВШЭ // М.: НИУ ВШЭ, 2014. — 35 с.
