= List of countries by past and projected GDP (PPP) per capita =

This is an alphabetical list of countries by past and projected Gross Domestic Product per capita, based on the Purchasing Power Parity (PPP) methodology, not on official exchange rates. Values are given in International Dollars. These figures have been taken from the International Monetary Fund's World Economic Outlook (WEO) Database, October 2026 edition.

== IMF estimates ==
=== 1980s ===
IMF estimates (1980s)
Country / territory	1980	1981	1982	1983	1984	1985	1986	1987	1988	1989
Afghanistan										
Albania	2,174	2,466	2,638	2,713	2,808	2,795	2,953	2,943	2,948	3,274
Algeria	4,169	4,559	4,990	5,292	5,609	5,829	5,778	5,729	5,649	6,003
Andorra										
Angola	1,560	1,589	1,644	1,734	1,856	1,758	1,795	1,866	1,997	2,020
Antigua and Barbuda	3,426	3,924	4,211	4,678	5,427	6,129	7,094	7,889	8,723	9,629
Argentina	7,178	7,276	7,358	7,821	8,127	7,670	8,277	8,598	8,622	8,230
Armenia										
Aruba							8,114	9,229	10,969	12,568
Australia	10,299	11,554	12,075	12,331	13,419	14,394	14,821	15,683	16,630	17,816
Austria	12,196	13,309	14,383	15,411	16,019	16,884	17,609	18,324	19,128	20,602
Azerbaijan										
Bahamas	12,799	13,349	14,723	15,975	16,579	17,574	18,083	18,896	19,595	20,481
Bahrain	18,582	20,102	21,916	23,564	24,607	24,312	24,072	23,528	24,911	25,241
Bangladesh	648	717	759	800	849	881	912	945	974	1,012
Barbados	6,301	6,743	6,788	7,070	7,569	7,872	8,413	8,816	9,412	10,097
Belarus										
Belgium	11,668	12,726	13,605	14,176	15,058	15,783	16,393	17,176	18,601	19,896
Belize	1,555	1,702	1,641	1,759	1,975	1,954	2,079	2,532	2,849	3,332
Benin	978	1,054	1,104	1,089	1,098	1,144	1,162	1,131	1,173	1,151
Bhutan	567	686	769	838	912	954	1,019	1,212	1,400	1,507
Bolivia	2,752	2,791	2,789	2,724	2,759	2,741	2,669	2,745	2,865	3,026
Bosnia and Herzegovina										
Botswana	2,069	2,404	2,853	3,168	3,371	3,612	3,860	4,384	5,404	5,672
Brazil	4,428	4,532	4,737	4,654	4,972	5,421	5,829	6,070	6,186	6,518
Brunei						43,359	42,194	42,694	43,277	43,606
Bulgaria	5,076	5,833	6,435	6,871	7,433	7,801	8,382	9,006	9,573	9,942
Burkina Faso	385	422	444	444	456	510	546	543	579	599
Burundi	383	456	466	488	492	551	564	592	626	640
Cape Verde	861	1,006	1,078	1,203	1,266	1,390	1,428	1,495	1,607	1,727
Cambodia								664	732	763
Cameroon	1,317	1,640	1,821	1,968	2,134	2,319	2,458	2,397	2,221	2,200
Canada	11,863	13,270	13,481	14,225	15,461	16,552	17,075	17,983	19,182	20,052
Central African Republic	752	902	901	859	955	995	1,052	1,055	1,097	1,160
Chad	502	480	525	616	655	709	744	766	826	847
Chile	3,479	3,979	3,592	3,571	3,857	3,995	4,228	4,538	4,956	5,602
China	276	313	357	406	478	552	604	680	770	822
Colombia	2,802	3,069	3,218	3,325	3,487	3,734	3,949	4,177	4,408	4,641
Comoros	1,130	1,273	1,373	1,437	1,536	1,585	1,606	1,634	1,727	1,729
Democratic Republic of the Congo	931	996	1,019	1,040	1,093	1,097	1,134	1,155	1,163	1,155
Republic of the Congo	1,623	1,768	1,865	1,925	1,980	2,029	2,055	2,090	2,559	3,034
Costa Rica	4,182	4,342	4,150	4,310	4,687	4,728	4,941	5,159	5,377	5,754
Ivory Coast	2,583	2,861	2,930	2,825	2,790	2,871	2,954	2,899	3,008	3,092
Croatia										
Cyprus	6,079	6,772	7,556	8,163	9,081	9,698	10,128	10,999	12,206	13,513
Czech Republic										
Denmark	12,427	13,497	14,903	15,905	17,209	18,494	19,740	20,290	21,044	22,019
Djibouti										
Dominica		2,173	2,411	2,579	2,794	2,934	3,217	3,517	3,940	4,101
Dominican Republic	2,495	2,784	2,938	3,120	3,196	3,151	3,248	3,577	3,695	3,922
Ecuador	3,103	3,431	3,585	3,522	3,701	3,883	3,980	3,740	4,169	4,240
Egypt	2,170	2,361	2,618	2,883	3,140	3,382	3,523	3,683	3,886	4,069
El Salvador	2,291	2,338	2,308	2,420	2,526	2,601	2,631	2,731	2,841	2,934
Equatorial Guinea	335	367	370	373	363	398	379	391	403	401
Eritrea										
Estonia										
Eswatini	1,472	1,666	1,736	1,736	1,784	1,809	2,103	2,280	2,425	2,633
Ethiopia	367	393	409	445	436	386	418	472	476	476
Fiji	2,972	3,366	3,445	3,344	3,734	3,650	3,932	3,725	3,985	4,624
Finland	9,996	11,045	12,028	12,810	13,620	14,477	15,119	15,996	17,377	18,917
France	10,759	11,851	12,813	13,405	14,058	14,675	15,248	15,949	17,195	18,588
Gabon	7,947	8,172	8,838	9,166	9,748	10,410	10,173	8,630	9,048	10,620
Gambia	971	906	1,120	1,270	1,168	1,200	1,204	1,218	1,232	1,283
Georgia										
Germany	12,002	13,127	13,838	14,655	15,676	16,567	17,298	17,983	19,196	20,524
Ghana	959	982	929	878	970	1,042	1,105	1,180	1,270	1,346
Greece	9,439	10,049	10,488	10,711	11,262	11,854	12,118	12,094	13,018	13,983
Grenada	2,306	2,514	2,704	2,815	2,956	3,185	3,480	3,919	4,231	4,618
Guatemala	3,172	3,408	3,403	3,361	3,413	3,412	3,397	3,516	3,689	3,887
Guinea										
Guinea-Bissau	707	754	817	804	860	907	897	952	985	1,033
Guyana	2,614	2,871	2,779	2,564	2,726	2,840	2,913	3,009	2,955	2,955
Haiti	1,715	1,864	1,890	1,900	1,938	1,978	1,988	1,992	2,050	2,064
Honduras	1,638	1,716	1,731	1,760	1,881	1,988	2,074	2,200	2,250	2,334
Hong Kong	6,608	7,715	8,300	8,990	10,093	10,354	11,598	13,359	14,858	15,641
Hungary	6,307	7,104	7,765	8,145	8,689	8,976	9,331	9,998	10,388	10,920
Iceland	12,524	14,145	15,154	15,190	16,190	17,095	18,410	20,315	20,723	21,218
India	525	596	639	696	731	776	811	844	937	1,008
Indonesia	1,109	1,281	1,363	1,447	1,582	1,663	1,783	1,910	2,074	2,305
Iran	4,378	4,350	5,475	6,083	5,632	5,696	5,045	5,038	4,780	5,146
Iraq										
Ireland	8,157	9,041	9,640	9,877	10,486	10,994	11,261	11,940	12,789	14,122
Israel	7,571	8,617	9,116	9,516	9,949	10,533	10,956	11,875	12,524	12,976
Italy	11,054	12,652	13,479	14,161	15,144	16,054	16,843	17,812	19,209	20,624
Jamaica	3,183	3,574	3,847	4,082	4,260	4,290	4,641	5,085	5,024	5,456
Japan	8,960	10,151	11,054	11,823	12,706	13,699	14,359	15,325	16,850	18,302
Jordan	4,253	5,154	5,576	5,655	5,949	5,844	6,079	6,159	6,315	5,645
Kazakhstan										
Kenya	1,379	1,515	1,630	1,662	1,692	1,758	1,859	1,945	2,064	2,170
Kiribati	933	1,063	1,069	1,026	1,187	1,032	1,001	1,014	1,250	1,174
South Korea	2,200	2,546	2,887	3,354	3,798	4,188	4,716	5,403	6,211	6,849
Kosovo										
Kuwait										
Kyrgyzstan										
Laos	585	725	788	822	883	967	1,006	993	978	1,086
Latvia										
Lebanon	7,475	8,055	5,331	6,717	9,875	12,415	11,517	13,440	9,797	5,771
Lesotho	423	465	508	528	557	576	594	611	668	721
Liberia										
Libya	22,953	19,205	19,769	18,785	17,107	17,854	15,542	13,028	12,861	13,704
Liechtenstein										
Lithuania										
Luxembourg	17,415	19,156	20,535	21,741	23,572	25,629	28,623	30,294	33,725	38,104
Macau										
Madagascar	948	911	924	944	969	985	998	1,008	1,051	1,107
Malawi	412	416	441	462	488	503	485	475	478	478
Malaysia	3,046	3,480	3,817	4,112	4,479	4,437	4,456	4,691	5,209	5,765
Maldives	2,111	2,399	2,654	2,778	3,263	3,684	3,931	4,275	4,690	5,191
Mali	781	855	814	809	797	912	906	906	1,021	1,079
Malta	6,089	6,786	7,169	7,369	7,759	8,127	8,381	9,014	9,900	10,912
Marshall Islands										
Mauritania										
Mauritius	1,985	2,266	2,508	2,592	2,785	3,045	3,383	3,791	4,163	4,485
Mexico	6,486	7,597	7,875	7,627	7,997	8,225	7,890	8,083	8,301	8,766
Federated States of Micronesia										
Moldova										
Mongolia										
Montenegro										
Morocco	1,476	1,531	1,737	1,753	1,851	1,983	2,140	2,088	2,334	2,426
Mozambique	197	221	214	184	175	181	179	211	237	261
Myanmar										
Namibia										
Nauru										
Nepal	493	571	615	606	673	720	752	767	837	888
Netherlands	12,159	13,132	13,690	14,422	15,349	16,189	16,942	17,580	18,905	20,402
New Zealand	9,762	10,945	11,863	12,195	13,368	13,823	14,228	14,803	15,270	15,775
Nicaragua										
Niger	635	670	703	679	566	608	639	635	681	693
Nigeria										
North Macedonia										
Norway	13,354	14,809	15,703	16,912	18,535	20,120	21,280	22,060	22,641	23,702
Oman	6,701	7,928	9,387	10,502	11,567	13,666	13,350	12,362	13,470	13,615
Pakistan	929	1,049	1,164	1,256	1,316	1,436	1,517	1,603	1,721	1,828
Palau										
Panama	4,444	5,186	5,665	5,494	5,715	6,051	6,254	6,159	5,407	5,589
Papua New Guinea	1,074	1,158	1,212	1,274	1,279	1,333	1,408	1,504	1,556	1,528
Paraguay	3,495	4,055	4,121	4,032	4,170	4,339	4,314	4,472	4,766	5,097
Peru	2,988	3,365	3,476	3,198	3,360	3,459	3,867	4,175	3,830	3,373
Philippines	1,784	1,970	2,114	2,183	2,046	1,909	1,966	2,050	2,216	2,389
Poland	4,864	4,749	4,754	5,144	5,265	5,599	5,875	6,128	6,546	7,055
Portugal	6,504	7,306	7,877	8,227	8,403	8,786	9,252	10,208	11,144	12,369
Puerto Rico	6,292	6,904	7,047	7,292	8,033	8,377	9,152	9,739	10,625	11,460
Qatar	56,086	54,463	49,289	45,257	50,989	43,310	43,626	43,280	45,085	47,486
Romania	5,298	5,770	6,336	6,951	7,603	7,800	8,105	8,325	8,531	8,321
Russia										
Rwanda	416	450	449	477	545	567	590	583	585	554
Samoa										
San Marino										
São Tomé and Príncipe	1,501	1,445	1,547	1,510	1,434	1,575	1,473	1,425	1,463	1,523
Saudi Arabia	37,890	40,677	34,506	30,394	28,788	26,243	25,753	24,346	25,587	25,429
Senegal	1,023	1,145	1,276	1,220	1,273	1,317	1,344	1,418	1,416	1,485
Serbia										
Seychelles										
Sierra Leone	1,354	1,474	1,560	1,559	1,634	1,541	1,540	1,581	1,635	1,743
Singapore	8,870	10,255	11,161	12,428	13,746	14,073	14,563	16,289	18,292	20,335
Slovakia										
Slovenia										
Solomon Islands	951	988	998	1,043	1,049	1,017	1,006	1,086	1,107	1,167
Somalia										
South Africa	4,928	5,534	5,694	5,651	5,989	5,947	5,919	6,048	6,376	6,628
South Sudan										
Spain	8,315	8,980	9,601	10,095	10,594	11,148	11,729	12,676	13,788	15,015
Sri Lanka	1,087	1,237	1,365	1,448	1,585	1,699	1,790	1,842	1,939	2,040
Saint Kitts and Nevis	2,799	3,191	3,608	3,688	4,211	4,648	5,192	5,797	6,668	7,399
Saint Lucia	2,505	2,843	3,043	3,248	3,584	4,099	4,708	4,939	5,747	6,437
Saint Vincent and the Grenadines	1,845	2,095	2,305	2,429	2,663	2,896	3,099	3,168	3,719	3,899
Sudan	1,103	1,246	1,339	1,333	1,245	1,241	1,354	1,437	1,522	1,565
Suriname										
Sweden	10,732	12,273	13,207	13,987	15,098	15,905	16,681	17,614	18,600	19,666
Switzerland	19,349	21,426	22,313	23,199	24,685	26,307	27,208	28,156	29,876	32,163
Syria	2,073	2,379	2,508	2,562	2,402	2,571	2,418	2,426	2,739	2,587
Taiwan	3,214	3,782	4,136	4,617	5,188	5,538	6,237	7,127	7,879	8,813
Tajikistan										
Tanzania	475	506	525	540	560	585	615	646	678	712
Thailand	1,598	1,816	1,994	2,147	2,311	2,450	2,590	2,855	3,290	3,776
Timor-Leste										
Togo	953	975	962	925	992	1,031	1,053	1,021	1,129	1,186
Tonga	723	898	1,069	1,163	1,718	1,882	2,100	2,183	2,170	2,268
Trinidad and Tobago	5,997	6,758	7,328	6,722	6,468	6,314	6,161	5,969	5,890	6,027
Tunisia	2,045	2,297	2,369	2,517	2,726	2,877	2,784	2,980	3,036	3,179
Turkey	3,585	4,003	4,297	4,574	4,953	5,216	5,578	6,169	6,403	6,553
Turkmenistan										
Tuvalu										
Uganda	416	459	512	541	527	510	507	521	562	600
Ukraine										
United Arab Emirates	63,504	68,946	63,879	60,817	60,792	58,032	45,802	47,449	40,084	46,396
United Kingdom	9,305	10,123	10,976	11,877	12,561	13,455	14,120	15,228	16,588	17,605
United States	12,553	13,949	14,405	15,514	17,086	18,199	19,035	20,001	21,376	22,814
Uruguay	4,809	5,327	5,092	4,950	5,021	5,163	5,630	6,076	6,285	6,567
Uzbekistan										
Vanuatu	1,044	1,153	1,208	1,262	1,389	1,394	1,379	1,352	1,338	1,403
Venezuela	7,913	8,296	8,781	8,000	8,483	8,588	9,182	9,620	10,349	9,037
Vietnam	580	658	741	810	892	954	985	1,013	1,081	1,187
Palestine										
Yemen										
Zambia	1,233	1,393	1,392	1,386	1,369	1,388	1,398	1,412	1,550	1,506
Zimbabwe										

=== 1990s ===
IMF estimates (1990s)
Country / territory	1990	1991	1992	1993	1994	1995	1996	1997	1998	1999
Afghanistan										
Albania	3,003	2,249	2,147	2,424	2,725	3,049	3,408	3,107	3,441	3,965
Algeria	6,197	6,176	6,265	6,133	6,072	6,308	6,550	6,625	6,931	7,143
Andorra										
Angola	1,971	2,208	2,435	2,679	2,928	3,191	3,493	3,685	3,772	3,782
Antigua and Barbuda	10,300	10,792	10,986	11,578	12,296	11,691	12,348	12,884	13,282	13,633
Argentina	8,251	9,300	10,350	11,092	11,838	11,598	12,316	13,389	13,904	13,476
Armenia			1,792	1,614	1,799	1,992	2,151	2,264	2,460	2,586
Aruba	13,414	14,825	15,914	17,392	18,886	19,274	19,351	20,869	21,405	21,792
Australia	18,503	18,712	19,437	20,488	21,732	22,559	23,610	24,907	26,092	27,318
Austria	22,155	23,489	24,251	24,692	25,674	26,846	27,955	29,014	30,332	31,856
Azerbaijan			3,692	2,895	2,341	2,066	2,134	2,342	2,486	2,781
Bahamas	21,115	20,563	19,881	20,066	20,778	21,694	22,634	23,761	24,750	26,462
Bahrain	26,868	27,276	29,397	31,541	32,386	32,826	33,616	34,088	35,203	36,850
Bangladesh	1,086	1,133	1,191	1,247	1,298	1,361	1,420	1,477	1,539	1,601
Barbados	10,094	9,994	9,605	9,878	10,254	10,643	11,226	11,916	12,454	12,625
Belarus			4,993	4,712	4,254	3,882	4,076	4,643	5,116	5,376
Belgium	21,245	22,279	23,055	23,266	24,452	25,484	26,261	27,653	28,451	29,813
Belize	3,736	4,206	4,728	4,987	4,947	4,959	4,979	5,096	5,163	5,622
Benin	1,261	1,317	1,345	1,394	1,399	1,483	1,535	1,603	1,634	1,677
Bhutan	1,686	1,832	1,938	2,083	2,205	2,400	2,570	2,717	2,842	3,002
Bolivia	3,218	3,426	3,498	3,662	3,841	4,027	4,210	4,417	4,640	4,649
Bosnia and Herzegovina							3,044	3,832	4,415	4,944
Botswana	6,171	6,582	6,528	6,762	6,673	7,206	7,343	7,823	7,621	8,193
Brazil	6,291	6,461	6,471	6,823	7,226	7,585	7,669	7,942	7,934	7,963
Brunei	44,450	46,110	48,163	48,315	49,523	51,686	52,823	51,680	50,660	51,708
Bulgaria	9,435	8,779	8,308	7,604	7,571	7,693	8,328	7,332	7,750	7,234
Burkina Faso	601	661	661	683	689	725	799	842	889	939
Burundi	668	709	712	685	661	610	561	564	586	587
Cape Verde	1,764	1,807	1,859	1,994	2,185	2,336	2,477	2,650	2,841	3,155
Cambodia	775	833	881	905	960	993	993	981	997	1,120
Cameroon	2,077	2,005	1,929	1,857	1,796	1,842	1,914	1,995	2,059	2,113
Canada	20,530	20,517	20,920	21,734	22,948	23,809	24,398	25,623	26,691	28,232
Central African Republic	1,182	1,175	1,107	1,085	1,208	1,234	1,152	1,186	1,206	1,225
Chad	879	971	985	956	997	977	983	1,021	1,066	1,036
Chile	5,926	6,485	7,187	7,718	8,154	8,938	9,425	10,160	10,567	10,557
China	873	982	1,134	1,308	1,494	1,676	1,857	2,045	2,211	2,397
Colombia	4,920	5,101	5,338	5,668	5,979	6,315	6,457	6,706	6,716	6,442
Comoros	1,874	1,772	1,900	1,950	1,871	1,975	1,959	2,036	2,016	2,058
Democratic Republic of the Congo	1,084	993	875	746	689	700	680	608	579	554
Republic of the Congo	3,084	3,206	3,324	3,350	3,279	3,388	3,476	3,430	3,699	3,518
Costa Rica	6,035	6,235	6,812	7,278	7,544	7,797	7,833	8,194	8,659	8,929
Ivory Coast	3,048	3,031	2,975	2,767	2,749	2,879	3,083	3,201	3,279	3,286
Croatia			8,859	8,534	9,434	10,436	11,148	11,888	12,438	12,351
Cyprus	14,747	14,958	16,302	16,397	17,368	19,299	19,592	20,150	21,336	22,466
Czech Republic						15,602	16,625	16,831	16,970	17,463
Denmark	23,198	24,279	25,258	25,744	27,600	28,929	30,109	31,453	32,425	33,741
Djibouti		2,602	2,641	2,507	2,510	2,442	2,344	2,294	2,256	2,289
Dominica	4,501	4,733	4,939	5,165	5,276	5,550	5,826	6,056	6,355	6,467
Dominican Republic	3,771	3,868	4,322	4,664	4,804	5,098	5,413	5,902	6,268	6,634
Ecuador	4,426	4,701	4,872	4,979	5,195	5,321	5,419	5,661	5,823	5,544
Egypt	4,282	4,428	4,450	4,544	4,741	4,944	5,172	5,452	5,813	6,126
El Salvador	3,136	3,247	3,505	3,747	3,969	4,208	4,288	4,469	4,610	4,750
Equatorial Guinea	414	410	540	590	680	848	1,270	3,081	3,738	4,603
Eritrea			763	889	1,109	1,166	1,300	1,428	1,465	1,468
Estonia				7,860	8,080	8,595	9,322	10,843	11,551	11,631
Eswatini	2,881	2,912	2,959	3,034	3,173	3,399	3,524	3,634	3,723	3,845
Ethiopia	491	455	410	460	470	494	554	563	531	557
Fiji	5,035	5,024	5,409	5,636	6,003	6,250	6,607	6,500	6,588	7,200
Finland	19,587	18,967	18,643	18,839	19,913	21,105	22,199	23,954	25,470	26,900
France	19,714	20,548	21,207	21,514	22,418	23,367	24,032	24,975	26,041	27,169
Gabon	11,335	12,048	11,580	12,031	12,433	13,000	13,383	14,044	14,337	12,917
Gambia	1,352	1,372	1,372	1,377	1,314	1,344	1,367	1,349	1,413	1,483
Georgia					1,920	2,091	2,440	2,839	3,041	3,243
Germany	22,088	23,672	24,538	24,736	25,856	26,745	27,463	28,440	29,387	30,445
Ghana	1,410	1,489	1,552	1,624	1,676	1,742	1,815	1,908	1,977	2,046
Greece	14,417	15,139	15,450	15,468	16,024	16,631	17,084	17,936	18,648	19,317
Grenada	5,026	5,262	5,300	5,261	5,411	5,593	5,903	6,265	7,052	7,621
Guatemala	4,058	4,206	4,382	4,516	4,648	4,825	4,922	5,081	5,238	5,372
Guinea	1,556	1,563	1,557	1,580	1,594	1,634	1,686	1,765	1,817	1,883
Guinea-Bissau	1,098	1,191	1,228	1,258	1,294	1,344	1,389	1,465	1,125	1,304
Guyana	2,998	3,296	3,631	4,012	4,427	4,722	5,170	5,554	5,498	5,719
Haiti	2,089	2,147	2,105	2,008	1,774	1,953	2,033	2,085	2,116	2,165
Honduras	2,419	2,350	2,479	2,627	2,613	2,754	2,777	2,874	2,931	2,875
Hong Kong	16,773	18,129	19,457	20,764	22,041	22,484	23,145	24,554	23,133	23,852
Hungary	10,981	10,004	9,918	10,103	10,638	11,152	11,385	11,950	12,574	13,181
Iceland	22,106	22,617	22,020	22,606	23,681	24,032	25,479	26,800	28,734	29,911
India	1,080	1,104	1,166	1,224	1,307	1,407	1,510	1,567	1,651	1,788
Indonesia	2,557	2,832	3,035	3,300	3,565	3,875	4,206	4,428	3,846	3,886
Iran	5,918	6,731	7,009	6,967	6,894	7,103	7,581	7,696	7,835	8,018
Iraq										
Ireland	15,796	16,505	17,344	18,066	19,475	21,697	23,939	26,687	29,046	32,188
Israel	13,917	14,173	14,997	15,521	16,537	18,022	18,964	19,507	20,025	20,458
Italy	21,817	22,859	23,563	23,895	24,921	26,177	27,063	28,044	28,857	29,754
Jamaica	5,834	6,041	6,303	6,541	6,747	6,998	7,077	7,012	6,937	7,036
Japan	19,840	21,150	21,750	22,091	22,708	23,666	24,786	25,497	25,258	25,479
Jordan	5,224	4,775	5,495	5,651	5,846	6,139	6,198	6,362	6,472	6,611
Kazakhstan			6,828	6,403	6,115	5,777	5,986	6,312	6,359	6,647
Kenya	2,280	2,315	2,272	2,256	2,296	2,377	2,452	2,440	2,468	2,478
Kiribati	1,113	1,070	1,337	1,348	1,386	1,433	1,434	1,451	1,507	1,444
South Korea	7,741	8,786	9,458	10,254	11,340	12,578	13,701	14,674	14,005	15,741
Kosovo										
Kuwait				36,860	36,769	35,659	34,744	34,663	35,484	33,999
Kyrgyzstan			2,490	2,180	1,778	1,709	1,835	2,023	2,058	2,130
Laos	1,158	1,209	1,286	1,355	1,458	1,554	1,652	1,758	1,820	1,886
Latvia			5,884	5,353	5,675	5,961	6,288	7,053	7,675	8,075
Lebanon	5,085	7,121	7,451	8,004	8,674	9,261	9,630	10,601	10,949	10,830
Lesotho	781	853	911	955	1,012	1,062	1,121	1,168	1,191	1,222
Liberia										
Libya	15,651	18,727	17,905	16,988	17,579	14,916	15,206	14,831	14,676	14,635
Liechtenstein										
Lithuania						7,024	7,585	8,423	9,237	9,332
Luxembourg	41,165	45,615	46,862	49,284	51,509	53,093	54,097	57,556	61,218	66,478
Macau										
Madagascar	1,153	1,088	1,096	1,116	1,106	1,115	1,126	1,153	1,176	1,212
Malawi	505	554	519	579	527	605	664	703	699	714
Malaysia	6,248	6,969	7,550	8,262	8,969	9,794	10,692	11,380	10,391	10,903
Maldives	4,974	5,249	5,559	5,839	6,245	6,718	7,304	8,032	8,736	9,310
Mali	1,040	1,187	1,130	1,182	1,247	1,255	1,331	1,378	1,449	1,496
Malta	11,733	12,510	13,682	14,413	15,246	16,490	17,372	18,383	19,083	19,968
Marshall Islands								2,107	2,086	2,054
Mauritania	2,886	2,904	2,941	3,100	2,985	3,253	3,408	3,234	3,267	3,338
Mauritius	4,951	5,288	5,686	6,044	6,339	6,692	7,122	7,562	8,026	8,247
Mexico	9,389	9,902	10,295	10,645	11,152	10,533	11,211	12,042	12,749	13,111
Federated States of Micronesia						2,065	2,028	1,929	2,003	2,049
Moldova			5,120	5,192	3,660	3,687	3,545	3,676	3,481	3,415
Mongolia	3,140	2,877	2,622	2,575	2,661	2,847	2,921	3,045	3,138	3,234
Montenegro										
Morocco	2,608	2,845	2,774	2,761	3,090	2,912	3,304	3,243	3,489	3,507
Mozambique	270	290	264	289	302	304	332	368	400	442
Myanmar									731	792
Namibia	3,995	4,173	4,496	4,382	4,474	4,664	4,766	4,922	5,011	5,122
Nauru										
Nepal	941	1,008	1,044	1,079	1,164	1,200	1,259	1,321	1,348	1,402
Netherlands	21,920	23,035	23,746	24,439	25,540	26,748	28,041	29,596	31,147	32,956
New Zealand	16,174	16,077	16,387	17,450	18,566	19,593	20,438	21,024	21,160	22,298
Nicaragua					2,334	2,451	2,583	2,661	2,735	2,911
Niger	688	685	691	686	690	697	686	684	735	717
Nigeria	2,490	2,488	2,526	2,552	2,539	2,566	2,641	2,686	2,704	2,679
North Macedonia			6,470	6,097	6,084	6,107	6,250	6,423	6,683	7,041
Norway	24,972	26,404	27,805	29,108	31,058	32,864	34,946	37,185	38,391	39,492
Oman	16,904	17,881	19,152	20,115	20,678	21,525	22,009	23,266	23,700	23,675
Pakistan	1,927	2,049	2,196	2,237	2,325	2,432	2,575	2,599	2,655	2,739
Palau										
Panama	6,140	6,800	7,367	7,789	8,014	8,157	8,737	9,379	10,073	10,534
Papua New Guinea	1,471	1,616	1,744	1,972	2,168	2,082	2,201	2,044	2,109	2,125
Paraguay	5,356	5,579	5,652	5,918	6,209	6,609	6,676	6,919	6,848	6,705
Peru	3,255	3,371	3,363	3,554	4,002	4,309	4,430	4,711	4,662	4,721
Philippines	2,495	2,510	2,519	2,574	2,682	2,799	2,871	3,004	2,948	3,025
Poland	6,730	6,453	6,717	7,149	7,669	8,356	9,033	9,833	10,433	11,057
Portugal	13,870	14,857	15,683	15,925	16,463	17,136	17,994	19,025	20,062	21,021
Puerto Rico	12,215	12,835	13,634	14,502	15,318	16,224	16,768	17,741	18,944	19,880
Qatar	35,983	35,983	40,268	40,657	42,060	42,576	44,191	55,580	59,617	60,349
Romania	8,138	7,337	6,873	7,182	7,671	8,441	8,985	8,632	8,351	8,411
Russia			10,887	10,229	9,117	8,921	8,771	9,059	8,687	9,394
Rwanda	564	541	590	576	369	497	571	638	640	605
Samoa									2,688	2,697
San Marino										
São Tomé and Príncipe	1,503	1,529	1,529	1,564	1,603	1,638	1,662	1,676	1,706	1,742
Saudi Arabia	27,491	29,220	30,473	30,531	30,693	30,648	31,435	32,003	32,438	31,872
Senegal	1,486	1,532	1,544	1,555	1,541	1,625	1,644	1,677	1,755	1,843
Serbia										6,601
Seychelles										
Sierra Leone	1,809	1,709	1,580	1,625	1,726	1,588	1,214	1,012	1,004	919
Singapore	22,284	23,889	25,285	28,129	30,932	32,834	34,502	36,761	35,145	37,380
Slovakia				7,680	8,284	9,072	9,783	10,555	11,065	11,156
Slovenia			11,836	12,518	13,463	14,307	15,044	16,122	16,820	18,016
Solomon Islands	1,195	1,267	1,415	1,460	1,564	1,707	1,717	1,683	1,679	1,650
Somalia										
South Africa	6,692	6,681	6,523	6,596	6,793	6,999	7,293	7,478	7,480	7,653
South Sudan										
Spain	16,148	17,071	17,550	17,675	18,424	19,540	20,333	21,426	22,556	23,838
Sri Lanka	2,225	2,518	2,466	2,685	2,935	3,152	3,576	3,989	3,948	4,097
Saint Kitts and Nevis	8,157	8,697	9,126	9,722	10,333	10,775	11,466	12,361	12,466	12,969
Saint Lucia	7,267	7,451	8,105	8,223	8,406	8,596	8,876	8,841	9,373	9,633
Saint Vincent and the Grenadines	4,181	4,338	4,714	5,024	5,061	5,562	5,729	6,025	6,334	6,589
Sudan	1,538	1,652	1,732	1,769	1,818	2,092	2,196	2,321	2,489	2,579
Suriname	8,121	7,142	7,489	7,398	6,934	7,775	8,688	9,331	9,515	9,437
Sweden	20,347	20,669	20,801	20,778	21,896	23,214	24,023	25,178	26,522	28,004
Switzerland	34,318	34,725	35,022	35,485	36,380	37,068	37,729	39,079	40,510	41,590
Syria	2,864	3,183	3,582	3,830	4,020	4,217	4,314	4,239	4,418	4,236
Taiwan	9,534	10,576	11,605	12,573	13,686	14,756	15,830	16,906	17,664	18,978
Tajikistan			1,277	1,154	921	814	784	798	834	851
Tanzania	770	793	795	798	797	817	854	881	900	932
Thailand	4,311	4,775	5,281	5,822	6,363	6,954	7,399	7,234	6,675	6,998
Timor-Leste										
Togo	1,265	1,264	1,216	1,054	1,221	1,417	1,329	1,356	1,307	1,326
Tonga	2,451	2,668	2,612	2,659	2,777	3,050	3,098	3,126	3,221	3,328
Trinidad and Tobago	6,304	6,676	7,472	7,555	7,954	8,399	9,138	9,977	10,893	11,912
Tunisia	3,425	3,611	3,906	4,016	4,175	4,309	4,621	4,903	5,138	5,459
Turkey	7,299	7,488	7,985	8,690	8,260	8,900	9,552	10,293	10,580	10,254
Turkmenistan			2,341	2,135	1,758	1,629	1,518	1,348	1,435	1,675
Tuvalu										
Uganda	639	649	681	719	766	827	869	896	932	989
Ukraine			8,346	7,350	5,832	5,275	4,878	4,854	4,855	4,959
United Arab Emirates	59,989	60,622	61,298	60,741	62,264	62,695	66,408	69,447	64,494	63,456
United Kingdom	18,313	18,599	19,026	19,875	20,941	21,833	22,760	24,224	25,224	26,231
United States	23,848	24,303	25,393	26,364	27,674	28,671	29,947	31,440	32,834	34,496
Uruguay	6,795	7,232	7,935	8,290	8,998	8,997	9,614	10,199	10,695	10,561
Uzbekistan			2,089	2,042	1,939	1,926	1,957	2,030	2,109	2,199
Vanuatu	1,603	1,676	1,724	1,744	1,857	1,867	1,896	1,972	1,966	1,951
Venezuela	9,659	10,699	11,339	11,378	11,099	11,526	11,467	12,157	12,088	11,301
Vietnam	1,241	1,333	1,456	1,583	1,731	1,904	2,086	2,260	2,380	2,491
Palestine					2,524	2,575	2,506	2,763	3,096	3,295
Yemen										
Zambia	1,506	1,501	1,521	1,512	1,299	1,332	1,406	1,447	1,420	1,468
Zimbabwe									3,820	3,842

=== 2000s ===
IMF estimates (2000s)
Country / territory	2000	2001	2002	2003	2004	2005	2006	2007	2008	2009
Afghanistan			1,083	1,113	1,106	1,231	1,283	1,467	1,522	1,782
Albania	4,364	4,878	5,194	5,610	6,104	6,678	7,336	8,047	8,885	9,302
Algeria	7,448	7,730	8,153	8,724	9,222	9,876	10,320	10,764	11,008	10,993
Andorra										
Angola	3,856	3,974	4,433	4,518	4,987	5,660	6,290	7,032	7,646	7,555
Antigua and Barbuda	14,500	13,915	14,133	15,142	16,283	17,700	20,349	22,601	22,775	19,942
Argentina	13,529	13,091	11,733	12,914	14,309	15,911	17,550	19,456	20,433	19,155
Armenia	2,800	3,150	3,690	4,316	4,919	5,810	6,822	8,023	8,806	7,679
Aruba	23,905	25,447	25,243	25,629	27,833	28,398	29,207	30,873	32,095	28,388
Australia	28,472	29,487	30,839	32,034	33,872	35,525	37,010	38,936	39,871	40,181
Austria	33,536	34,610	35,494	36,445	38,145	39,980	42,341	44,982	46,367	44,873
Azerbaijan	2,991	3,328	3,663	4,078	4,532	5,839	7,994	10,129	11,288	12,211
Bahamas	27,668	28,583	29,357	29,113	29,712	31,222	32,520	33,403	32,790	31,178
Bahrain	39,280	39,687	38,767	39,055	39,821	40,639	41,276	42,426	43,270	41,805
Bangladesh	1,690	1,782	1,846	1,937	2,060	2,230	2,420	2,628	2,808	2,934
Barbados	13,440	13,376	13,651	14,182	14,723	15,734	17,075	17,860	18,255	17,408
Belarus	5,832	6,284	6,747	7,417	8,547	9,715	11,084	12,423	14,003	14,149
Belgium	31,543	32,531	33,449	34,310	36,349	38,178	40,108	42,414	43,089	42,187
Belize	6,279	6,575	6,862	7,482	7,846	8,061	8,462	8,749	8,544	8,333
Benin	1,760	1,839	1,895	1,939	2,017	2,049	2,128	2,249	2,333	2,331
Bhutan	3,195	3,395	3,669	3,993	4,275	4,590	4,952	5,576	6,174	6,520
Bolivia	4,774	4,877	5,001	5,107	5,367	5,672	6,019	6,383	6,822	6,951
Bosnia and Herzegovina	5,269	5,788	6,167	6,530	7,124	7,628	8,284	9,022	9,717	9,528
Botswana	8,588	8,805	9,428	9,955	10,185	10,831	11,620	12,384	12,773	10,809
Brazil	8,334	8,527	8,813	8,982	9,644	10,151	10,762	11,605	12,309	12,252
Brunei	57,250	57,961	59,888	62,109	62,776	63,623	67,149	65,386	63,192	61,536
Bulgaria	7,659	8,397	9,080	9,800	10,774	11,961	13,237	14,574	15,835	15,487
Burkina Faso	950	1,005	1,032	1,100	1,143	1,242	1,318	1,368	1,432	1,441
Burundi	599	607	613	621	638	661	693	710	728	723
Cape Verde	3,391	3,609	3,788	4,080	4,325	4,651	5,164	6,039	6,518	6,392
Cambodia	1,248	1,326	1,441	1,562	1,711	1,985	2,235	2,483	2,719	2,835
Cameroon	2,183	2,268	2,343	2,452	2,622	2,689	2,800	2,917	2,972	2,981
Canada	30,078	31,004	32,081	32,996	34,605	36,489	38,219	39,670	40,405	39,019
Central African Republic	1,175	1,199	1,222	1,187	1,192	1,237	1,306	1,370	1,404	1,421
Chad	1,012	1,113	1,179	1,328	1,754	1,875	1,857	1,924	1,955	1,878
Chile	11,201	11,679	12,106	12,793	13,874	14,998	16,237	17,369	18,192	17,914
China	2,641	2,905	3,201	3,573	4,017	4,590	5,302	6,185	6,876	7,535
Colombia	6,681	6,857	7,049	7,377	7,882	8,388	9,118	9,882	10,288	10,355
Comoros	2,043	2,158	2,246	2,289	2,378	2,541	2,522	2,560	2,658	2,706
Democratic Republic of the Congo	505	491	498	525	562	617	647	698	740	725
Republic of the Congo	3,870	3,627	3,634	3,621	3,587	3,897	4,178	3,863	4,049	4,369
Costa Rica	9,547	9,737	10,051	10,524	11,108	11,732	12,788	14,011	14,741	14,488
Ivory Coast	3,199	3,184	3,091	3,023	3,055	3,116	3,170	3,221	3,273	3,306
Croatia	13,622	14,633	15,714	16,913	18,084	19,435	21,045	22,712	23,606	22,160
Cyprus	24,076	25,333	26,381	27,292	29,061	30,991	32,960	34,926	36,022	34,596
Czech Republic	18,596	19,658	20,327	21,430	23,042	25,271	27,709	29,932	31,036	29,494
Denmark	35,679	36,698	37,304	38,101	40,107	42,232	45,064	46,573	47,024	44,668
Djibouti	2,300	2,343	2,411	2,494	2,592	2,715	2,892	3,077	3,274	3,301
Dominica	6,768	6,915	6,829	7,411	7,848	8,153	8,802	9,622	10,513	10,462
Dominican Republic	6,997	7,232	7,572	7,515	7,816	8,713	9,693	10,575	11,004	11,063
Ecuador	5,647	5,922	6,203	6,394	6,891	7,360	7,774	7,990	8,526	8,520
Egypt	6,457	6,699	6,883	7,094	7,441	7,858	8,475	9,145	9,775	10,068
El Salvador	4,888	5,021	5,163	5,337	5,523	5,850	6,296	6,578	6,826	6,704
Equatorial Guinea	9,515	14,950	17,435	19,523	25,052	26,759	28,083	31,764	36,422	35,476
Eritrea	1,284	1,378	1,380	1,306	1,301	1,325	1,310	1,329	1,068	1,183
Estonia	13,031	14,198	15,516	17,131	18,901	21,473	24,439	27,125	26,301	22,636
Eswatini	3,960	4,054	4,264	4,486	4,745	5,159	5,609	5,981	6,105	6,199
Ethiopia	609	652	656	638	714	808	905	1,005	1,101	1,188
Fiji	7,196	7,472	7,777	7,935	8,536	8,635	9,037	9,115	9,376	9,241
Finland	29,026	30,406	31,316	32,506	34,627	36,587	39,089	42,110	43,066	39,639
France	28,814	29,791	30,374	31,057	32,471	33,894	35,706	37,337	37,940	36,936
Gabon	12,645	12,885	12,734	12,954	13,067	13,661	13,240	14,059	13,387	12,821
Gambia	1,557	1,639	1,567	1,663	1,778	1,742	1,735	1,784	1,877	1,957
Georgia	3,445	3,763	4,077	4,655	5,093	5,787	6,576	7,633	8,021	7,813
Germany	32,018	33,249	33,664	34,156	35,526	37,019	39,712	42,061	43,372	41,363
Ghana	2,113	2,185	2,258	2,356	2,483	2,650	2,817	2,934	3,178	3,296
Greece	20,518	21,834	23,100	24,859	26,840	27,933	30,553	32,389	32,958	31,698
Grenada	8,156	8,146	8,481	9,404	9,599	11,243	11,099	12,066	12,378	11,644
Guatemala	5,499	5,666	5,839	5,971	6,185	6,447	6,855	7,331	7,561	7,493
Guinea	1,943	2,027	2,135	2,166	2,235	2,328	2,405	2,591	2,716	2,789
Guinea-Bissau	1,320	1,385	1,427	1,421	1,445	1,554	1,610	1,660	1,730	1,743
Guyana	5,754	6,007	6,171	6,257	6,529	6,600	7,138	7,825	8,111	8,399
Haiti	2,195	2,200	2,222	2,308	2,302	2,409	2,486	2,630	2,707	2,837
Honduras	3,069	3,138	3,220	3,346	3,560	3,800	4,077	4,346	4,515	4,336
Hong Kong	25,972	26,631	27,512	28,748	31,931	35,158	38,418	41,803	43,356	42,353
Hungary	14,116	15,054	16,051	17,073	18,447	19,882	21,347	22,022	22,714	21,340
Iceland	31,705	33,152	33,470	34,680	38,050	41,571	44,331	48,259	48,790	44,455
India	1,863	1,960	2,029	2,193	2,390	2,617	2,870	3,126	3,238	3,463
Indonesia	4,124	4,309	4,509	4,750	5,051	5,428	5,821	6,268	6,768	7,030
Iran	8,542	8,796	9,496	10,261	10,828	11,350	12,093	13,239	13,390	13,436
Iraq				3,869	5,931	6,060	6,438	6,578	7,087	7,192
Ireland	35,493	37,626	39,772	41,103	44,177	47,033	49,477	52,026	49,855	47,281
Israel	22,103	22,143	21,986	22,360	23,590	24,933	26,661	28,593	29,550	29,393
Italy	31,601	32,939	33,522	34,091	35,262	36,372	38,008	39,458	39,476	37,347
Jamaica	7,185	7,376	7,498	7,898	8,188	8,490	8,974	9,317	9,385	9,089
Japan	26,780	27,396	27,787	28,674	30,043	31,554	33,032	34,510	34,782	32,956
Jordan	6,873	7,198	7,608	7,864	8,169	8,912	9,683	10,464	11,208	11,494
Kazakhstan	7,473	8,688	9,687	10,761	12,027	13,487	15,229	16,840	17,516	17,371
Kenya	2,474	2,561	2,546	2,597	2,714	2,879	3,060	3,265	3,244	3,283
Kiribati	1,550	1,507	1,525	1,503	1,506	1,545	1,649	1,708	1,653	1,637
South Korea	17,432	18,524	20,152	21,072	22,671	24,349	26,278	28,423	29,615	29,888
Kosovo	5,006	5,351	5,272	5,420	5,277	5,619	5,916	6,489	6,652	6,918
Kuwait	35,873	36,010	36,350	42,303	46,584	56,588	60,477	63,579	57,636	53,888
Kyrgyzstan	2,265	2,415	2,430	2,628	2,854	2,903	3,053	3,366	3,661	3,749
Laos	2,019	2,128	2,272	2,424	2,632	2,861	3,163	3,448	3,731	3,970
Latvia	8,804	9,700	10,754	12,002	13,534	15,766	18,516	21,179	21,018	17,993
Lebanon	11,014	11,519	11,939	12,222	13,286	13,834	14,246	15,695	17,170	18,799
Lesotho	1,299	1,374	1,434	1,532	1,617	1,739	1,875	2,015	2,094	2,102
Liberia	1,282	1,299	1,345	958	1,003	1,068	1,154	1,289	1,338	1,361
Libya	15,317	15,780	15,134	17,570	18,707	20,898	21,163	22,621	22,536	21,230
Liechtenstein	92,095	91,424	91,604	89,757	94,676	101,896	112,499	123,901	123,070	108,160
Lithuania	9,932	10,920	11,911	13,535	14,942	16,945	19,046	21,992	23,143	20,130
Luxembourg	72,668	75,646	78,407	81,262	85,697	89,360	96,014	105,012	105,035	100,250
Macau		38,301	41,955	47,105	59,144	62,980	69,437	77,903	80,438	83,058
Madagascar	1,257	1,322	1,142	1,241	1,302	1,366	1,440	1,518	1,603	1,504
Malawi	718	689	686	723	766	800	839	919	980	1,038
Malaysia	11,815	11,827	12,350	13,011	13,944	14,771	15,865	17,149	17,992	17,523
Maldives	9,824	9,974	10,572	12,111	12,986	11,717	14,669	15,827	17,314	15,735
Mali	1,475	1,695	1,719	1,865	1,881	1,926	1,992	2,014	2,059	2,115
Malta	20,095	20,254	20,959	22,015	22,553	23,764	24,925	26,848	28,417	27,981
Marshall Islands	2,140	2,377	2,540	2,534	2,561	2,650	2,722	2,880	2,678	2,804
Mauritania	3,187	3,140	3,141	3,328	3,479	3,790	4,770	4,672	4,619	4,532
Mauritius	9,035	9,461	9,696	10,404	11,073	11,518	12,477	13,492	14,450	14,989
Mexico	13,901	13,957	13,943	14,190	14,892	15,477	16,486	17,024	17,242	16,004
Federated States of Micronesia	2,181	2,283	2,331	2,420	2,412	2,554	2,639	2,677	2,672	2,731
Moldova	3,575	3,886	4,266	4,651	5,139	5,715	6,189	6,563	7,221	6,837
Mongolia	3,304	3,492	3,683	3,984	4,430	4,810	5,296	5,832	6,300	6,093
Montenegro	9,035	9,303	9,588	9,982	10,682	11,463	12,817	14,081	15,314	14,453
Morocco	3,595	3,903	4,045	4,336	4,608	4,842	5,310	5,531	5,896	6,108
Mozambique	444	498	538	571	616	657	723	778	824	855
Myanmar	899	1,021	1,129	1,292	1,520	1,769	2,054	2,359	2,569	2,681
Namibia	5,290	5,415	5,755	5,977	6,460	6,887	7,287	7,658	7,903	7,862
Nauru					4,336	4,461	4,989	3,993	4,904	4,652
Nepal	1,495	1,589	1,591	1,663	1,765	1,863	1,966	2,071	2,223	2,322
Netherlands	34,898	36,233	36,616	37,174	38,785	40,694	43,358	46,194	47,946	46,245
New Zealand	23,623	24,596	25,727	26,875	28,503	29,995	31,416	33,069	33,370	32,890
Nicaragua	3,038	3,134	3,142	3,219	3,413	3,597	3,822	4,071	4,236	4,069
Niger	699	739	759	763	757	808	850	867	917	905
Nigeria	2,808	2,976	3,365	3,651	4,023	4,314	4,611	4,938	5,242	5,552
North Macedonia	7,498	7,407	7,614	7,918	8,527	9,289	10,123	11,134	12,039	12,148
Norway	41,522	43,197	44,235	45,347	48,306	50,939	53,542	56,274	57,040	55,817
Oman	25,265	26,570	26,333	25,830	26,588	27,668	29,269	30,908	33,596	34,614
Pakistan	2,842	2,939	2,990	3,129	3,378	3,672	3,903	4,113	4,273	4,240
Palau	8,505	9,261	9,770	9,674	10,197	10,734	11,302	11,910	11,684	11,238
Panama	11,002	11,131	11,360	11,940	13,013	14,262	15,855	18,096	19,968	20,064
Papua New Guinea	2,068	2,061	2,040	2,215	2,234	2,347	2,423	2,622	2,604	2,736
Paraguay	6,564	6,551	6,565	6,908	7,309	7,630	8,177	8,791	9,478	9,447
Peru	4,887	4,967	5,263	5,538	5,918	6,433	7,076	7,835	8,660	8,751
Philippines	3,230	3,332	3,437	3,609	3,872	4,112	4,380	4,706	4,916	4,931
Poland	11,914	12,332	12,708	13,420	14,483	15,442	16,915	18,563	19,745	20,376
Portugal	22,161	22,939	23,346	23,497	24,502	25,421	26,583	27,932	28,520	27,774
Puerto Rico	20,838	23,275	24,118	25,155	26,339	26,663	27,213	27,788	27,964	27,738
Qatar	63,609	65,955	69,545	70,339	78,927	76,976	86,252	87,909	78,088	84,231
Romania	8,854	9,536	10,517	11,080	12,627	13,719	15,367	17,027	19,425	18,643
Russia	10,610	11,447	12,192	13,360	14,762	16,264	18,197	20,322	21,808	20,218
Rwanda	653	706	792	806	858	946	1,041	1,126	1,236	1,294
Samoa	2,881	3,132	3,345	3,572	3,764	4,122	4,325	4,429	4,639	4,607
San Marino					57,452	59,995	63,401	68,863	69,032	61,614
São Tomé and Príncipe	1,758	1,811	1,838	1,947	2,025	2,182	2,395	2,479	2,669	2,711
Saudi Arabia	33,278	33,291	32,736	35,402	38,504	41,021	42,595	43,599	46,031	44,675
Senegal	1,912	1,991	1,975	2,074	2,173	2,279	2,343	2,409	2,479	2,495
Serbia	7,182	7,855	8,502	9,089	9,981	10,934	11,757	13,075	14,074	13,771
Seychelles										
Sierra Leone	949	1,106	1,358	1,467	1,570	1,682	1,774	1,849	1,909	1,894
Singapore	40,966	40,337	42,185	45,642	50,887	55,040	59,942	64,381	63,380	61,956
Slovakia	11,488	12,135	12,867	13,769	14,909	16,372	18,382	20,922	22,456	21,326
Slovenia	18,978	19,931	20,864	21,944	23,543	25,202	27,435	30,085	31,700	29,154
Solomon Islands	1,398	1,273	1,217	1,281	1,375	1,479	1,543	1,598	1,684	1,698
Somalia										
South Africa	8,040	8,332	8,586	8,931	9,488	10,182	10,952	11,702	12,143	11,859
South Sudan										
Spain	25,395	26,742	27,377	28,252	29,398	30,887	32,554	33,947	34,437	33,166
Sri Lanka	4,515	4,495	4,697	5,032	5,403	5,872	6,467	7,042	7,550	7,811
Saint Kitts and Nevis	14,827	15,694	16,057	15,712	16,721	18,959	20,125	20,847	22,542	21,850
Saint Lucia	9,737	9,520	9,624	10,148	11,093	11,310	12,316	12,810	13,608	13,350
Saint Vincent and the Grenadines	6,841	7,098	7,551	8,163	8,686	9,152	10,039	10,618	10,856	10,777
Sudan	2,794	3,088	3,241	3,419	3,598	3,828	4,098	4,337	4,475	4,267
Suriname	9,513	10,069	10,486	11,163	12,084	12,927	13,936	14,856	15,556	15,908
Sweden	29,893	30,890	31,971	33,087	35,256	37,227	39,881	41,961	42,039	40,132
Switzerland	43,869	45,365	45,880	46,275	48,368	51,025	54,483	57,808	59,718	58,077
Syria	4,319	4,457	4,662	4,524	4,816	5,108	5,397	5,716	5,939	6,176
Taiwan	20,463	20,512	21,860	23,148	25,328	27,430	29,769	32,553	33,331	32,877
Tajikistan	928	1,027	1,116	1,230	1,369	1,475	1,593	1,726	1,858	1,900
Tanzania	972	1,025	1,087	1,154	1,244	1,339	1,405	1,522	1,594	1,649
Thailand	7,392	7,739	8,263	8,948	9,680	10,312	11,066	11,888	12,232	12,132
Timor-Leste	2,318	2,537	2,199	2,045	2,077	2,181	2,093	2,302	2,542	2,744
Togo	1,310	1,317	1,355	1,438	1,427	1,369	1,408	1,419	1,457	1,497
Tonga	3,517	3,633	3,840	3,902	3,915	3,996	4,005	4,001	4,262	4,055
Trinidad and Tobago	12,990	13,725	14,870	17,182	18,841	20,476	23,989	25,571	26,797	25,537
Tunisia	5,758	6,046	6,158	6,509	7,035	7,443	8,004	8,693	9,147	9,388
Turkey	11,061	10,545	11,254	11,997	13,382	14,875	16,214	17,288	17,560	16,575
Turkmenistan	2,008	2,445	2,844	3,361	3,917	4,518	5,110	5,761	6,656	7,021
Tuvalu			2,767	2,711	2,712	2,618	2,700	2,920	3,145	2,967
Uganda	1,017	1,095	1,152	1,204	1,264	1,388	1,481	1,588	1,727	1,816
Ukraine	5,420	6,084	6,566	7,391	8,547	9,154	10,213	11,418	11,959	10,251
United Arab Emirates	69,756	68,507	67,242	68,435	70,368	70,197	74,230	69,033	62,521	57,177
United Kingdom	27,949	29,150	29,981	31,407	32,836	34,529	36,133	37,917	38,339	36,575
United States	36,313	37,101	37,946	39,405	41,642	44,034	46,217	47,943	48,471	47,102
Uruguay	10,548	10,364	9,725	10,022	10,797	11,927	12,777	13,979	15,251	15,925
Uzbekistan	2,343	2,463	2,570	2,698	2,943	3,209	3,516	3,902	4,270	4,567
Vanuatu	2,066	1,995	1,878	1,951	2,037	2,162	2,363	2,441	2,568	2,606
Venezuela	11,590	12,051	10,974	10,157	12,143	13,601	15,167	16,684	17,299	16,445
Vietnam	2,684	2,895	3,107	3,369	3,695	4,060	4,436	4,835	5,158	5,417
Palestine	2,990	2,697	2,333	2,639	3,214	3,583	3,552	3,677	3,919	4,171
Yemen										
Zambia	1,516	1,584	1,630	1,723	1,835	1,964	2,110	2,267	2,403	2,549
Zimbabwe	3,772	3,850	3,618	3,089	2,950	2,793	2,735	2,707	2,294	2,456

=== 2010s ===
IMF estimates (2010s)
Country / territory	2010	2011	2012	2013	2014	2015	2016	2017	2018	2019
Afghanistan	1,900	1,990	2,218	2,303	2,320	2,292	2,303	2,339	2,436	2,589
Albania	9,812	10,297	10,719	11,165	11,378	12,343	13,260	14,022	14,962	16,318
Algeria	11,431	11,775	12,027	12,287	12,742	12,990	13,333	13,483	13,704	13,851
Andorra	50,352	51,768	50,119	49,017	50,682	51,046	52,439	52,353	54,509	56,683
Angola	7,747	7,878	8,375	8,596	8,818	8,650	8,282	8,126	8,370	8,622
Antigua and Barbuda	18,382	18,191	18,884	18,814	19,273	19,432	20,114	20,709	23,447	25,150
Argentina	21,009	22,469	22,396	23,066	22,628	23,210	22,702	23,515	24,498	23,535
Armenia	7,988	8,524	9,310	9,811	10,373	10,852	11,025	12,108	12,906	14,981
Aruba	27,928	29,822	30,191	32,777	33,692	34,955	35,659	37,505	39,288	38,621
Australia	41,081	42,413	44,082	45,112	46,390	47,218	48,151	49,425	51,429	53,749
Austria	46,131	48,303	49,289	49,702	50,552	51,174	52,088	53,765	56,356	60,499
Azerbaijan	12,869	12,984	13,335	14,169	14,626	14,740	14,258	14,380	15,347	16,798
Bahamas	31,606	32,131	34,183	33,431	34,292	34,601	34,151	35,503	36,336	37,112
Bahrain	42,346	45,289	47,335	48,899	49,472	49,101	49,528	50,184	51,993	56,600
Bangladesh	3,100	3,331	3,572	3,807	4,062	4,320	4,620	4,960	5,564	6,116
Barbados	17,158	17,434	17,191	17,460	17,853	17,827	18,201	18,601	19,379	19,572
Belarus	15,478	16,662	17,271	17,735	18,493	17,926	17,624	18,414	20,026	22,302
Belgium	43,506	44,600	45,219	45,872	47,313	48,212	48,930	50,360	52,598	56,878
Belize	8,359	8,366	8,705	9,011	9,320	9,462	9,355	9,166	9,534	10,492
Benin	2,338	2,385	2,472	2,617	2,749	2,742	2,778	2,902	2,981	3,216
Bhutan	7,201	8,033	8,640	8,986	9,389	9,967	10,719	11,368	11,743	12,415
Bolivia	7,230	7,661	8,098	8,686	9,205	9,602	9,965	10,420	10,758	11,005
Bosnia and Herzegovina	9,812	10,232	10,494	11,153	11,494	12,125	12,663	13,334	14,395	15,744
Botswana	11,796	12,612	12,612	14,037	14,877	14,084	15,027	15,701	15,786	15,931
Brazil	13,227	13,935	14,357	14,922	15,138	14,621	14,174	14,523	15,432	16,035
Brunei	62,884	65,472	66,401	65,342	64,129	63,720	62,002	62,579	65,329	68,074
Bulgaria	16,044	17,122	17,675	17,974	18,572	19,512	20,442	21,537	23,006	25,477
Burkina Faso	1,536	1,623	1,707	1,783	1,837	1,870	1,943	2,041	2,076	2,240
Burundi	734	752	772	795	815	772	762	761	753	778
Cape Verde	6,517	6,873	7,038	7,162	7,297	7,393	7,750	8,214	8,169	8,890
Cambodia	2,974	3,252	3,561	3,847	4,081	4,337	4,632	5,003	5,559	6,036
Cameroon	3,017	3,094	3,206	3,329	3,474	3,590	3,677	3,767	4,011	4,241
Canada	40,262	41,962	43,035	44,315	45,915	46,267	46,699	48,385	50,068	50,584
Central African Republic	1,559	1,626	1,718	1,103	1,116	1,193	1,240	1,294	1,329	1,483
Chad	2,092	2,159	2,315	2,344	2,360	2,380	2,243	2,168	2,301	2,446
Chile	18,995	20,385	21,820	22,692	23,249	23,696	24,024	24,425	25,492	25,826
China	8,394	9,320	10,163	11,073	12,029	12,929	13,845	14,981	16,267	17,572
Colombia	10,834	11,702	12,262	12,986	13,677	14,075	14,345	14,617	15,481	16,349
Comoros	2,783	2,896	2,979	3,098	3,150	3,147	3,212	3,326	3,256	3,275
Democratic Republic of the Congo	766	815	873	943	998	1,038	1,019	1,047	1,110	1,117
Republic of the Congo	4,664	4,710	5,130	5,057	5,357	5,301	4,772	4,477	5,636	5,702
Costa Rica	15,163	15,952	16,822	17,313	18,011	18,616	19,350	20,280	21,272	23,111
Ivory Coast	3,319	3,133	3,440	3,717	3,999	4,271	4,493	4,776	5,030	5,599
Croatia	22,181	22,687	22,705	23,202	23,653	24,720	26,103	27,892	29,788	33,068
Cyprus	34,844	34,835	33,375	31,677	31,760	33,119	35,511	37,958	40,528	44,699
Czech Republic	30,556	31,665	31,949	32,446	33,764	35,680	36,807	39,288	41,560	45,520
Denmark	45,734	47,070	47,773	49,069	50,340	51,577	53,222	55,427	57,357	60,682
Djibouti	3,429	3,696	3,881	4,073	4,366	4,649	4,946	5,225	5,682	6,036
Dominica	10,675	10,990	11,155	11,203	11,807	11,470	11,890	11,589	13,051	14,291
Dominican Republic	12,012	12,517	12,968	13,693	14,773	15,797	16,859	17,671	18,899	20,789
Ecuador	8,810	9,576	10,131	10,852	11,308	11,234	11,084	11,770	12,167	12,531
Egypt	10,469	10,631	10,801	11,066	11,295	11,603	11,953	12,118	13,419	14,533
El Salvador	6,905	7,290	7,605	7,875	8,118	8,361	8,631	8,965	9,204	9,757
Equatorial Guinea	31,259	32,509	34,337	32,083	31,452	27,724	24,557	22,720	23,009	20,202
Eritrea	1,306	1,653	1,697	1,531	2,021	1,603	1,721	1,559	1,765	1,821
Estonia	23,525	25,916	27,466	28,525	30,065	30,901	32,130	34,507	37,121	40,588
Eswatini	6,475	6,719	7,175	7,538	7,784	7,944	8,208	8,584	8,535	9,248
Ethiopia	1,296	1,439	1,555	1,695	1,854	2,017	2,149	2,354	2,472	2,659
Fiji	9,581	9,991	10,269	10,896	11,655	12,241	12,605	13,310	13,627	13,259
Finland	41,197	42,861	42,787	42,887	43,230	43,670	45,091	47,277	49,270	52,311
France	37,890	39,436	40,072	40,930	41,698	42,319	42,920	44,565	46,496	51,225
Gabon	13,424	14,135	14,599	15,078	15,459	15,689	15,764	15,761	16,587	17,385
Gambia	2,038	1,855	1,931	1,962	1,913	1,955	1,960	2,039	2,277	2,418
Georgia	8,522	9,455	10,358	11,138	11,800	12,292	12,814	13,725	15,010	16,755
Germany	43,708	46,297	47,334	48,280	50,073	51,060	52,393	54,760	57,108	60,298
Ghana	3,510	3,985	4,296	4,574	4,674	4,708	4,802	5,171	5,536	6,003
Greece	30,190	27,759	26,039	26,099	26,975	27,354	27,818	28,808	29,975	32,187
Grenada	11,741	11,890	11,868	12,242	13,273	14,166	14,726	15,577	16,507	16,943
Guatemala	7,650	7,972	8,197	8,478	8,840	9,118	9,279	9,560	9,947	10,756
Guinea	2,849	2,954	3,161	3,236	3,431	3,416	3,686	4,106	4,110	4,531
Guinea-Bissau	1,849	1,996	1,955	2,009	2,020	2,117	2,202	2,298	2,276	2,319
Guyana	8,849	9,575	10,273	10,899	11,359	11,512	11,938	12,394	12,452	12,762
Haiti	2,666	2,814	2,835	2,961	3,017	3,075	3,113	3,200	3,081	3,057
Honduras	4,457	4,627	4,809	4,929	5,069	5,212	5,365	5,621	5,633	5,785
Hong Kong	45,407	48,183	49,487	51,603	53,640	54,999	56,204	59,088	60,615	61,119
Hungary	21,868	22,812	23,049	24,008	25,602	26,876	27,896	29,688	32,235	35,608
Iceland	44,237	46,622	47,840	49,985	51,195	53,069	56,378	58,232	59,895	63,215
India	3,748	3,969	4,206	4,490	4,845	5,219	5,636	6,056	6,602	7,013
Indonesia	7,462	7,941	8,457	8,955	9,440	9,874	10,335	10,933	11,621	12,237
Iran	14,201	15,111	14,643	14,479	15,276	15,012	15,946	16,487	16,077	14,594
Iraq	7,546	8,075	9,136	9,749	9,540	9,813	11,204	10,939	12,860	13,063
Ireland	48,440	50,051	50,556	52,251	57,698	71,870	72,414	80,037	85,931	91,655
Israel	30,824	32,606	33,399	34,718	35,936	36,335	37,599	39,170	39,942	41,025
Italy	38,205	39,096	38,478	38,312	38,935	39,677	40,638	42,097	43,539	46,594
Jamaica	9,036	9,328	9,429	9,599	9,814	10,033	10,399	10,812	11,104	11,199
Japan	34,724	35,304	36,634	38,067	39,147	40,266	40,941	42,422	43,198	43,886
Jordan	11,570	11,639	11,432	10,932	10,591	10,093	10,151	10,323	10,037	10,421
Kazakhstan	18,601	20,119	21,217	22,525	23,554	23,662	23,762	24,791	25,999	29,769
Kenya	3,507	3,677	3,829	3,945	4,115	4,269	4,390	4,527	4,774	5,042
Kiribati	1,641	1,707	1,815	1,963	1,996	2,211	2,352	2,444	2,545	2,629
South Korea	32,202	33,817	35,140	36,746	38,346	39,623	41,105	43,156	45,511	46,511
Kosovo	7,235	7,732	8,040	8,397	8,686	9,442	9,924	10,393	11,010	11,814
Kuwait	50,429	50,979	52,445	51,538	50,508	48,904	48,857	45,771	50,248	50,451
Kyrgyzstan	3,727	3,987	4,004	4,427	4,594	4,719	4,868	5,088	4,921	5,471
Laos	4,277	4,645	5,028	5,447	5,883	6,280	6,682	7,160	7,511	7,791
Latvia	17,896	19,236	21,332	22,379	23,505	24,812	25,910	27,534	29,707	32,096
Lebanon	20,362	20,757	21,173	20,379	19,226	19,121	20,056	21,080	22,141	21,753
Lesotho	2,219	2,386	2,520	2,566	2,619	2,708	2,763	2,685	2,646	2,554
Liberia	1,413	1,505	1,614	1,739	1,736	1,709	1,654	1,683	1,763	1,801
Libya	22,113	11,482	22,429	18,334	14,081	13,866	13,581	18,026	18,879	16,194
Liechtenstein	117,407	113,814	114,582	121,378	127,080	127,775	131,439	138,667	144,656	145,599
Lithuania	20,865	23,162	24,947	26,655	28,371	29,713	31,141	33,595	36,497	40,567
Luxembourg	103,481	104,696	105,699	108,409	110,575	111,436	115,390	116,089	117,791	122,579
Macau	103,229	126,990	135,282	146,021	138,970	107,949	108,529	119,906	127,809	124,620
Madagascar	1,487	1,496	1,524	1,539	1,571	1,588	1,618	1,662	1,656	1,715
Malawi	1,092	1,136	1,146	1,192	1,246	1,258	1,262	1,299	1,282	1,356
Malaysia	18,733	19,804	20,954	21,791	23,124	24,132	25,085	26,690	28,247	29,750
Maldives	16,734	18,238	18,702	20,009	21,584	22,253	23,502	25,193	28,336	30,275
Mali	2,188	2,225	2,178	2,222	2,333	2,424	2,513	2,611	2,690	2,826
Malta	29,851	30,698	32,353	34,649	37,349	40,320	41,343	46,534	49,098	52,534
Marshall Islands	2,959	2,992	3,042	3,257	3,328	3,494	3,705	4,048	4,525	5,220
Mauritania	4,589	4,756	4,938	5,107	5,292	5,500	5,493	5,807	5,932	6,176
Mauritius	15,800	16,768	17,691	18,572	19,602	20,503	21,499	22,741	23,229	24,207
Mexico	16,748	17,425	18,129	18,356	18,914	19,394	19,728	20,263	20,685	20,725
Federated States of Micronesia	2,836	3,048	3,102	3,091	3,121	3,365	3,508	3,736	3,939	4,248
Moldova	7,418	8,014	8,115	9,004	9,626	9,731	10,349	11,152	11,768	13,311
Mongolia	6,510	7,653	8,585	9,540	10,242	10,372	10,415	10,995	12,202	13,485
Montenegro	15,010	15,817	15,684	16,460	17,112	17,681	18,442	19,357	21,084	23,705
Morocco	6,339	6,726	6,972	7,324	7,544	7,880	7,912	8,373	8,055	8,309
Mozambique	898	955	1,022	1,078	1,148	1,210	1,243	1,261	1,307	1,370
Myanmar	2,836	3,030	3,261	3,549	3,874	4,106	4,390	4,706	5,582	6,097
Namibia	8,312	8,775	9,219	9,648	10,147	10,401	10,226	10,026	9,993	9,746
Nauru	4,689	5,445	6,833	7,032	8,155	8,289	8,580	8,082	8,058	8,801
Nepal	2,448	2,573	2,736	2,875	3,092	3,227	3,256	3,605	3,956	4,261
Netherlands	47,168	48,759	48,962	49,633	51,160	52,508	54,041	56,201	58,992	62,571
New Zealand	33,495	34,503	35,837	36,921	38,359	39,317	40,353	41,559	41,946	44,715
Nicaragua	4,246	4,468	4,788	5,057	5,335	5,585	5,834	6,150	5,880	5,941
Niger	957	962	1,042	1,073	1,120	1,135	1,166	1,199	1,259	1,400
Nigeria	6,075	6,323	6,533	6,815	7,179	7,252	7,026	7,037	7,158	7,551
North Macedonia	12,790	13,421	13,662	14,354	15,175	15,949	16,612	17,161	18,460	20,223
Norway	56,302	57,499	59,445	60,528	62,139	63,396	64,248	66,660	72,454	73,508
Oman	34,520	32,984	33,271	33,457	33,296	33,875	33,848	33,453	37,749	37,035
Pakistan	4,283	4,403	4,516	4,655	4,786	4,893	5,017	5,212	5,387	5,434
Palau	11,240	12,222	12,948	12,931	13,655	14,901	15,301	15,048	15,336	15,643
Panama	21,177	23,786	26,114	27,775	29,093	30,427	31,630	33,538	32,534	33,365
Papua New Guinea	2,888	2,742	2,849	2,932	3,301	3,461	3,592	3,690	3,668	3,797
Paraguay	10,545	11,140	11,178	12,208	12,963	13,345	13,911	14,697	14,930	15,002
Peru	9,526	10,262	11,016	11,767	12,143	12,508	12,927	13,250	13,649	14,182
Philippines	5,267	5,491	5,882	6,286	6,697	7,080	7,531	8,069	8,651	9,216
Poland	21,340	22,911	23,684	24,262	25,678	27,064	28,182	30,172	32,343	35,875
Portugal	28,587	28,673	28,138	28,491	29,354	30,207	31,181	32,844	34,725	37,616
Puerto Rico	28,079	28,796	29,600	30,256	30,811	31,204	31,592	31,867	33,707	36,218
Qatar	95,908	107,842	108,758	106,802	103,485	99,464	96,376	92,839	102,880	101,337
Romania	18,263	19,570	20,418	20,902	22,222	23,226	24,252	26,868	29,293	33,352
Russia	21,377	22,673	23,983	24,766	25,326	24,991	25,196	26,043	28,718	31,253
Rwanda	1,364	1,473	1,586	1,649	1,731	1,857	1,935	2,014	2,198	2,452
Samoa	4,745	4,993	4,854	4,899	4,975	5,170	5,590	5,722	5,769	6,076
San Marino	57,972	53,468	49,921	49,765	49,709	51,073	52,482	53,290	56,169	59,183
São Tomé and Príncipe	2,723	2,776	2,853	2,992	3,134	3,156	3,295	3,436	3,941	4,655
Saudi Arabia	45,122	49,185	50,806	50,391	52,041	52,191	51,615	53,120	59,378	59,560
Senegal	2,540	2,555	2,633	2,666	2,802	2,925	3,053	3,246	3,393	3,661
Serbia	14,220	14,631	14,910	15,306	15,367	15,791	16,501	17,285	18,469	20,587
Seychelles										
Sierra Leone	2,053	2,187	2,318	2,517	2,485	2,375	2,452	2,533	2,640	2,704
Singapore	70,553	74,906	77,753	81,555	85,128	87,433	90,533	96,057	104,198	105,522
Slovakia	23,016	24,084	24,863	25,433	26,552	28,157	28,952	30,267	31,531	34,009
Slovenia	29,624	30,385	29,971	30,181	31,520	32,546	33,831	36,189	38,751	42,525
Solomon Islands	1,832	1,954	1,983	2,070	2,077	2,079	2,162	2,216	2,275	2,301
Somalia			1,653	1,728	1,757	1,804	1,749	1,896	1,715	1,740
South Africa	12,187	12,633	12,966	13,296	13,496	13,583	13,600	13,803	13,434	13,465
South Sudan		1,421	688	857	880	897	805	815	601	748
Spain	33,471	33,833	33,551	33,792	34,956	36,719	38,084	39,762	40,895	43,857
Sri Lanka	8,482	9,344	10,326	10,843	11,626	12,116	12,708	13,616	14,178	14,113
Saint Kitts and Nevis	22,087	22,781	23,288	24,783	26,877	26,723	27,825	28,170	28,672	29,850
Saint Lucia	13,499	14,372	14,518	14,372	14,747	14,783	15,426	16,142	17,430	18,663
Saint Vincent and the Grenadines	10,430	10,568	10,866	11,297	11,599	12,006	12,595	12,989	13,946	14,446
Sudan	4,371	5,306	4,180	4,201	4,338	4,456	4,572	4,553	4,580	4,248
Suriname	16,683	17,849	18,495	19,062	19,149	18,526	17,524	17,884	18,140	20,028
Sweden	42,615	44,552	44,848	45,704	47,068	49,067	49,860	51,069	52,678	56,641
Switzerland	60,014	61,482	62,687	64,260	66,202	66,944	68,139	69,599	72,454	75,565
Syria	6,375									
Taiwan	36,619	38,643	40,080	41,671	44,283	45,236	46,560	49,064	50,152	52,631
Tajikistan	2,002	2,146	2,297	2,453	2,604	2,726	2,879	3,073	3,137	3,549
Tanzania	1,731	1,854	1,929	2,032	2,140	2,219	2,314	2,431	2,543	2,786
Thailand	13,114	13,414	14,562	15,119	15,452	16,010	16,642	17,573	18,876	19,963
Timor-Leste	2,964	3,129	3,267	3,352	3,494	3,544	3,615	3,496	3,596	4,601
Togo	1,554	1,633	1,728	1,820	1,917	2,002	2,098	2,184	2,289	2,460
Tonga	4,127	4,488	4,704	4,755	4,959	5,087	5,502	5,785	5,954	6,041
Trinidad and Tobago	26,596	26,930	28,517	29,780	31,225	31,154	28,965	27,925	28,050	28,643
Tunisia	9,730	9,620	10,098	10,395	10,774	10,856	10,960	11,289	11,841	12,495
Turkey	17,935	20,019	21,101	22,985	24,133	25,430	26,170	28,353	28,640	29,017
Turkmenistan	8,187	9,977	11,665	12,831	13,487	13,481	13,869	14,477	15,766	17,002
Tuvalu	2,860	3,118	2,989	3,163	3,280	3,639	3,894	4,299	4,570	5,295
Uganda	1,913	2,034	2,055	2,109	2,206	2,336	2,293	2,419	2,610	2,791
Ukraine	10,844	11,708	11,965	12,209	11,834	10,819	11,235	11,761	12,795	14,483
United Arab Emirates	60,746	63,635	65,194	66,840	67,495	69,058	70,484	69,592	77,181	79,254
United Kingdom	37,624	38,483	39,580	40,751	42,468	43,480	44,511	46,556	47,780	50,729
United States	48,586	50,008	51,737	53,364	55,264	57,007	58,180	60,293	63,165	65,561
Uruguay	17,281	18,461	19,386	20,543	21,483	21,667	22,156	22,876	23,625	24,970
Uzbekistan	4,893	5,192	5,594	6,051	6,522	6,984	7,392	7,745	8,418	8,662
Vanuatu	2,608	2,683	2,699	2,774	2,845	2,905	2,996	3,107	3,184	3,268
Venezuela	16,292	16,834	17,619	17,679	17,328	16,585	13,858	12,130	10,001	7,436
Vietnam	5,776	6,281	6,678	7,093	7,598	8,117	8,649	9,317	10,176	11,108
Palestine	4,354	4,750	5,010	5,210	5,171	5,293	5,689	5,747	5,851	6,127
Yemen					2,278	1,516	1,420	1,459	1,571	1,623
Zambia	2,749	2,865	3,040	3,146	3,246	3,268	3,319	3,392	3,442	3,361
Zimbabwe	2,946	3,403	3,815	3,850	3,911	3,943	3,945	4,321	4,145	4,968

=== 2020s ===
IMF estimates (2020s)
Country / territory	2020	2021	2022	2023	2024	2025	2026	2027	2028	2029
Afghanistan	2,589	2,139	2,123	2,205	2,240	2,269				
Albania	16,247	18,385	21,002	23,078	24,981	26,888	28,819	31,034	32,933	34,885
Algeria	12,620	14,440	15,785	16,785	17,673	18,604	19,719	20,746	21,583	22,435
Andorra	51,672	58,459	66,897	68,259	71,036	74,059	76,288	78,264	79,453	80,446
Angola	7,782	8,720	9,436	9,618	10,043	10,270	10,713	11,025	11,223	11,407
Antigua and Barbuda	20,988	23,934	27,427	29,143	30,256	31,585	32,999	34,428	35,555	36,661
Argentina	22,302	26,015	29,279	29,546	29,626	31,497	32,899	34,761	36,591	38,338
Armenia	14,702	15,884	19,062	21,078	22,506	24,730	26,916	29,362	31,642	33,949
Aruba	28,599	34,729	41,154	46,762	50,608	55,270	59,260	62,767	65,371	67,601
Australia	53,960	60,478	66,117	68,405	69,754	72,108	75,039	77,696	79,806	81,928
Austria	58,627	63,746	71,568	72,644	73,577	75,965	78,828	81,799	84,241	86,449
Azerbaijan	15,345	20,335	22,730	23,751	25,071	25,782	26,786	27,915	28,846	29,758
Bahamas	27,621	31,289	37,471	40,419	42,744	45,041	47,248	49,169	50,584	51,825
Bahrain	53,436	54,955	61,684	64,272	67,332	70,859	63,736	73,456	77,311	79,492
Bangladesh	6,705	7,486	8,495	9,226	9,762	10,266	10,884	11,475	11,864	12,322
Barbados	16,187	17,290	21,424	22,552	23,826	25,094	26,339	27,695	28,789	29,846
Belarus	24,872	27,030	27,879	30,281	32,570	34,031	36,025	37,797	39,192	40,487
Belgium	56,199	62,045	68,777	71,697	73,874	76,136	78,906	82,031	84,503	86,989
Belize	9,585	11,598	13,640	13,986	14,605	15,132	15,613	16,173	16,584	16,982
Benin	3,245	3,464	3,845	4,136	4,448	4,816	5,181	5,550	5,880	6,215
Bhutan	12,879	12,762	14,233	15,384	16,628	18,429	20,335	22,374	24,033	26,060
Bolivia	9,581	11,202	12,308	12,912	12,916	12,871	12,736	12,772	12,935	13,345
Bosnia and Herzegovina	15,489	17,287	19,349	20,528	21,789	22,972	24,355	25,849	27,255	28,698
Botswana	15,261	17,961	19,979	21,045	20,631	20,799	22,135	23,030	23,884	24,963
Brazil	16,063	18,028	19,827	21,153	22,343	23,363	24,594	25,759	26,851	27,960
Brunei	70,673	80,203	83,642	86,763	91,575	94,043	98,028	101,379	105,175	108,420
Bulgaria	25,905	29,692	35,120	37,063	39,349	41,727	44,603	47,626	50,270	52,939
Burkina Faso	2,392	2,486	2,646	2,764	2,904	3,071	3,241	3,425	3,581	3,739
Burundi	787	837	889	922	959	996	1,036	1,086	1,118	1,157
Cape Verde	7,048	7,876	9,728	10,525	11,494	12,479	13,466	14,507	15,477	16,478
Cambodia	5,874	6,119	6,826	7,342	7,885	8,426	8,870	9,411	9,952	10,550
Cameroon	4,365	4,794	5,190	5,419	5,606	5,802	6,034	6,288	6,517	6,755
Canada	48,630	56,218	62,009	63,844	64,900	67,054	70,374	73,830	76,424	78,669
Central African Republic	1,659	1,745	1,891	1,987	2,012	2,113	2,170	2,238	2,288	2,337
Chad	2,270	2,581	2,811	2,975	3,115	3,268	3,433	3,633	3,776	3,940
Chile	25,535	29,202	31,623	32,738	34,262	35,791	37,008	38,974	40,561	42,135
China	18,254	20,840	23,037	25,223	27,189	29,369	31,786	34,178	36,372	38,527
Colombia	15,588	17,725	20,159	20,875	21,532	22,516	23,634	24,788	25,770	26,809
Comoros	3,229	3,364	3,571	3,731	3,867	4,031	4,194	4,366	4,527	4,679
Democratic Republic of the Congo	1,151	1,483	1,682	1,835	1,933	2,031	2,138	2,258	2,354	2,451
Republic of the Congo	4,487	5,832	6,158	6,300	6,407	6,551	6,820	7,087	7,300	7,522
Costa Rica	21,837	23,809	26,649	28,705	30,372	32,320	34,214	36,212	37,949	39,699
Ivory Coast	5,610	6,097	6,757	7,265	7,680	8,161	8,694	9,250	9,785	10,372
Croatia	31,596	36,914	42,689	45,907	48,809	51,693	54,512	57,403	59,874	62,347
Cyprus	42,854	49,161	56,333	59,328	62,115	65,038	68,256	72,000	74,830	77,726
Czech Republic	44,823	49,944	53,454	55,366	57,085	60,899	64,071	67,463	70,517	73,460
Denmark	62,775	70,152	75,066	77,973	82,657	87,303	92,876	96,991	99,853	102,807
Djibouti	6,183	6,668	7,411	8,103	8,778	9,329	10,062	10,772	11,438	12,148
Dominica	12,505	14,212	15,997	17,293	18,272	19,507	20,693	21,841	22,788	23,665
Dominican Republic	20,016	23,284	26,040	27,384	29,237	30,393	32,597	34,805	36,869	39,020
Ecuador	11,540	13,560	15,293	16,049	16,022	16,927	17,831	18,706	19,457	20,225
Egypt	16,551	16,930	19,066	20,212	20,949	22,174	23,624	25,019	26,280	27,708
El Salvador	9,393	10,810	11,877	12,676	13,278	14,061	15,077	16,061	16,816	17,578
Equatorial Guinea	16,694	20,371	21,838	20,351	20,348	19,106	18,880	18,756	18,935	19,211
Eritrea	1,821									
Estonia	40,673	45,059	47,970	47,554	48,750	50,934	53,660	56,720	59,162	61,517
Eswatini	9,329	9,990	10,637	11,318	11,841	12,618	13,394	14,146	14,786	15,414
Ethiopia	2,870	3,103	3,461	3,790	4,095	4,496	4,996	5,466	5,942	6,452
Fiji	10,883	10,441	13,093	14,825	15,651	16,371	17,139	17,970	18,741	19,563
Finland	53,338	57,426	61,720	63,075	64,869	67,097	70,254	73,252	75,477	77,703
France	49,599	54,017	59,178	62,198	64,480	66,559	68,852	71,342	73,583	75,754
Gabon	15,952	20,624	22,488	23,386	24,263	25,164	26,224	27,257	27,986	28,713
Gambia	2,523	2,767	3,050	3,269	3,465	3,668	3,887	4,111	4,302	4,490
Georgia	16,817	18,814	22,610	24,971	26,709	29,457	32,661	35,641	38,230	40,938
Germany	59,909	64,509	69,951	71,182	72,809	74,901	78,664	82,158	84,881	87,411
Ghana	6,047	6,608	7,210	7,568	8,063	8,609	9,242	9,857	10,380	10,924
Greece	29,772	33,622	38,352	40,874	42,903	44,960	47,365	49,804	51,783	53,710
Grenada	14,768	15,682	17,930	19,343	20,363	21,793	23,278	24,588	25,678	26,736
Guatemala	10,947	11,825	13,012	13,762	14,415	15,195	16,102	17,004	17,797	18,586
Guinea	5,311	5,515	6,026	6,501	6,926	7,411	8,011	8,686	9,521	10,433
Guinea-Bissau	2,314	2,526	2,769	2,959	3,114	3,313	3,513	3,725	3,895	4,068
Guyana	15,795	21,337	36,415	49,338	69,885	79,792	98,912	116,817	128,328	134,362
Haiti	2,971	3,005	3,123	3,138	3,043	2,998	3,006	3,044	3,088	3,133
Honduras	5,385	6,203	6,806	7,190	7,514	7,870	8,269	8,681	9,084	9,465
Hong Kong	58,613	65,988	67,447	71,650	75,699	80,408	85,843	90,540	93,516	96,551
Hungary	35,515	39,134	43,861	45,191	46,734	48,326	51,028	53,844	56,364	59,014
Iceland	58,835	65,517	75,028	79,645	79,155	80,915	83,002	85,391	87,188	89,179
India	6,815	7,856	8,986	9,918	10,807	11,853	12,998	14,226	15,402	16,638
Indonesia	11,930	12,948	14,448	15,578	16,608	17,723	19,091	20,506	21,821	23,195
Iran	15,782	16,716	18,547	20,119	21,177	21,319	20,159	21,327	21,870	22,469
Iraq	11,182	13,380	15,055	15,355	15,395	15,352	13,007	15,585	16,564	17,052
Ireland	97,160	115,865	131,229	129,464	135,280	147,825	149,642	158,563	165,094	170,744
Israel	40,798	45,916	51,215	52,604	54,091	56,676	60,100	63,557	66,064	68,522
Italy	44,285	50,377	56,775	59,480	61,508	63,508	66,221	68,816	70,866	72,810
Jamaica	10,098	10,801	12,304	13,101	13,349	13,696	14,148	14,922	15,495	16,024
Japan	43,703	46,322	50,418	53,023	54,677	57,043	59,712	62,338	64,368	66,359
Jordan	10,564	10,065	10,840	11,383	11,750	12,189	13,328	13,905	14,361	14,815
Kazakhstan	30,166	34,234	36,630	39,409	41,895	45,270	48,351	51,764	54,159	56,704
Kenya	5,128	5,712	6,304	6,793	7,166	7,564	8,036	8,531	8,985	9,453
Kiribati	2,583	2,886	3,195	3,369	3,561	3,753	3,933	4,092	4,201	4,306
South Korea	47,881	51,923	57,356	60,342	63,198	65,685	70,251	74,628	77,996	81,304
Kosovo	11,232	13,181	14,824	17,594	19,078	20,141	21,640	23,179	24,626	26,103
Kuwait	42,076	50,365	52,709	52,477	53,375	55,173	46,552	55,137	61,523	62,893
Kyrgyzstan	5,345	5,906	6,753	7,487	8,388	9,367	10,342	11,182	12,020	12,792
Laos	7,756	8,030	8,736	9,265	10,642	11,300	12,054	12,833	13,460	14,034
Latvia	32,617	35,439	39,055	39,725	41,089	43,489	46,063	48,466	50,626	52,737
Lebanon	12,672	10,498	11,357	11,670	11,286	11,958				
Lesotho	2,592	2,590	2,791	2,935	3,123	3,217	3,325	3,419	3,500	3,580
Liberia	1,586	1,537	1,689	1,793	1,872	1,978	2,113	2,239	2,354	2,477
Libya	10,955	12,642	12,224	13,854	14,653	17,244	18,224	19,149	19,867	20,544
Liechtenstein	139,387	175,785	177,569	188,932	189,092	192,328	198,987	205,442	210,305	215,562
Lithuania	41,253	46,465	50,581	52,175	54,789	57,826	61,229	64,433	67,547	70,799
Luxembourg	122,907	140,411	146,328	148,421	150,214	152,894	156,638	160,936	164,440	167,736
Macau	57,270	73,300	64,630	115,676	127,096	134,421	141,442	148,855	155,155	161,810
Madagascar	1,578	1,662	1,804	1,898	1,976	2,035	2,124	2,228	2,315	2,404
Malawi	1,415	1,575	1,656	1,702	1,725	1,764	1,819	1,865	1,897	1,929
Malaysia	28,696	31,385	36,578	38,823	41,372	44,131	47,453	50,647	53,359	56,147
Maldives	17,833	25,586	30,688	32,911	34,305	36,812	37,791	39,801	41,497	43,250
Mali	2,730	2,802	3,021	3,188	3,333	3,482	3,684	3,898	4,073	4,239
Malta	50,034	58,583	64,806	69,101	71,785	75,687	80,020	84,384	88,174	92,102
Marshall Islands	5,168	5,717	6,230	6,292	6,766	7,254	7,962	8,608	9,138	9,622
Mauritania	6,367	6,518	7,296	7,910	8,406	8,742	9,227	9,723	10,274	10,747
Mauritius	21,497	22,932	26,714	29,084	31,377	33,293	35,434	37,805	39,973	42,199
Mexico	19,141	20,814	22,954	24,338	25,108	25,684	26,743	27,863	28,854	29,841
Federated States of Micronesia	4,336	4,803	5,128	5,583	5,902	6,183	6,482	6,802	7,065	7,273
Moldova	13,484	15,498	16,221	17,529	18,545	19,837	21,182	22,750	24,386	26,167
Mongolia	13,530	14,637	16,245	17,862	19,041	20,654	22,428	24,224	25,828	27,363
Montenegro	20,625	24,126	27,915	30,840	32,615	34,360	36,564	38,751	40,719	42,718
Morocco	7,958	8,908	9,623	10,263	10,883	11,606	12,425	13,239	13,987	14,760
Mozambique	1,394	1,440	1,567	1,668	1,700	1,694	1,721	1,762	1,796	1,838
Myanmar	5,585	4,342	4,806	4,999	5,043	5,039	5,283	5,529	5,701	5,850
Namibia	9,497	9,852	10,807	11,391	11,841	12,105	12,513	13,006	13,415	13,850
Nauru	9,053	10,088	10,736	11,040	11,414	11,847	12,374	12,883	13,265	13,639
Nepal	4,236	4,546	5,104	5,404	5,754	6,174	6,615	7,083	7,649	8,198
Netherlands	62,719	69,552	77,737	79,175	81,468	84,445	88,202	91,747	94,523	97,165
New Zealand	44,963	47,650	52,356	54,354	54,622	55,871	58,563	61,588	64,180	66,666
Nicaragua	6,245	7,098	7,875	8,532	9,064	9,761	10,256	10,843	11,314	11,786
Niger	1,467	1,546	1,785	1,830	1,960	2,073	2,211	2,343	2,446	2,550
Nigeria	7,415	7,588	8,306	8,718	9,114	9,528	10,051	10,593	11,027	11,470
North Macedonia	19,962	22,373	24,704	26,341	27,887	29,759	32,009	34,256	36,218	38,237
Norway	69,713	92,322	101,822	104,894	108,107	111,462	116,169	120,576	123,596	126,485
Oman	35,774	38,829	40,862	41,061	42,368	43,781	46,196	47,751	48,975	50,343
Pakistan	5,436	5,774	6,442	6,541	6,753	7,016	7,371	7,721	8,064	8,425
Palau	14,907	13,733	14,652	15,398	17,690	19,284	20,860	22,152	23,242	24,292
Panama	27,110	30,990	36,381	39,929	41,548	43,951	47,129	50,046	52,791	55,675
Papua New Guinea	3,632	3,682	4,064	4,266	4,418	4,717	4,923	5,172	5,349	5,504
Paraguay	15,235	16,476	17,547	19,037	20,289	22,053	23,662	25,220	26,555	27,922
Peru	13,185	15,580	16,977	17,378	18,267	19,199	20,238	21,260	22,176	23,045
Philippines	8,456	9,101	10,409	11,296	12,142	12,899	13,642	14,627	15,580	16,626
Poland	36,657	41,671	47,245	49,328	52,405	55,940	60,051	63,638	66,684	69,783
Portugal	35,663	38,691	44,091	46,674	48,397	50,083	52,980	55,817	58,167	60,400
Puerto Rico	36,859	40,559	45,333	47,618	50,397	52,189	53,917	56,198	57,733	59,329
Qatar	81,003	106,491	111,441	112,327	115,565	119,556	103,804	126,519	142,821	152,733
Romania	34,081	37,716	42,452	45,009	46,859	48,166	49,628	52,504	55,124	57,970
Russia	31,778	39,005	41,263	44,593	48,192	50,241	52,602	54,893	56,738	58,551
Rwanda	2,430	2,862	3,293	3,640	3,899	4,282	4,652	5,036	5,401	5,785
Samoa	5,918	5,799	6,286	7,445	7,929	8,404	8,672	9,043	9,382	9,737
San Marino	56,761	65,376	75,269	78,166	80,722	83,838	87,524	90,908	93,575	96,284
São Tomé and Príncipe	5,145	5,733	6,034	6,160	6,284	6,388	6,501	6,702	6,884	7,070
Saudi Arabia	47,478	62,690	71,976	71,677	72,045	75,823	74,295	81,089	85,051	87,871
Senegal	3,763	4,178	4,524	4,763	5,062	5,394				
Serbia	21,013	23,670	26,709	28,929	31,013	32,708	35,186	38,066	40,523	43,070
Seychelles			29,222	31,915	33,389	35,927	37,183	39,545	41,264	42,968
Sierra Leone	2,719	2,849	3,144	3,374	3,544	3,733	3,933	4,151	4,343	4,535
Singapore	102,117	133,990	144,456	144,836	153,393	164,244	176,927	186,558	193,595	200,830
Slovakia	35,334	38,323	41,474	43,986	46,022	47,661	49,761	52,337	54,973	57,596
Slovenia	41,898	46,263	50,912	53,959	56,282	58,465	62,255	65,544	68,255	70,993
Solomon Islands	2,208	2,258	2,311	2,419	2,508	2,617	2,728	2,841	2,930	3,016
Somalia	1,654	1,598	1,712	1,800	1,868	1,922	1,976	2,037	2,087	2,144
South Africa	12,789	13,876	14,996	15,476	15,746	16,319	16,841	17,392	17,804	18,229
South Sudan	806	1,334	1,337	1,401	994	1,413	1,582	1,661	1,720	1,776
Spain	39,294	44,025	49,549	52,042	54,762	57,282	60,106	62,518	64,390	66,194
Sri Lanka	12,941	14,316	14,195	14,523	15,725	17,063	18,246	19,418	20,403	21,413
Saint Kitts and Nevis	24,858	24,261	28,515	30,945	32,214	33,500	35,192	37,083	38,719	40,470
Saint Lucia	15,136	19,141	24,440	26,274	28,055	28,449	29,573	30,857	31,812	32,723
Saint Vincent and the Grenadines	14,330	15,039	16,905	18,310	19,603	20,579	21,737	22,935	24,015	25,105
Sudan	4,452	3,759	3,828	2,961	2,389	2,389	2,576	2,978	3,259	3,495
Suriname	17,042	18,448	19,936	20,863	21,295	22,388	23,697	25,070	32,303	46,373
Sweden	57,253	62,362	67,209	69,388	72,334	74,651	78,476	82,125	84,976	87,645
Switzerland	74,633	84,619	93,165	96,834	99,159	102,397	106,944	110,855	114,485	117,262
Syria	6,375									
Taiwan	57,996	64,702	71,521	74,509	80,512	90,256	103,743	112,095	118,638	124,587
Tajikistan	3,760	4,114	4,674	5,156	5,635	6,165	6,727	7,294	7,786	8,284
Tanzania	3,061	3,258	3,547	3,759	3,951	4,174	4,447	4,726	4,975	5,230
Thailand	19,157	20,237	22,262	23,626	24,957	26,248	27,724	29,226	30,551	31,939
Timor-Leste	6,190	6,884	5,762	4,840	4,464	5,058	5,288	5,582	5,825	6,054
Togo	2,654	2,943	3,280	3,535	3,772	4,026	4,275	4,544	4,787	5,035
Tonga	6,238	6,466	6,797	7,308	7,619	8,184	8,635	9,099	9,465	9,820
Trinidad and Tobago	26,077	29,623	31,925	33,432	35,006	35,583	36,688	38,512	40,355	42,069
Tunisia	11,918	12,375	13,534	13,995	14,513	15,213	16,022	16,780	17,308	17,828
Turkey	29,209	32,412	36,258	39,355	41,672	44,208	46,679	49,635	52,441	55,341
Turkmenistan	16,647	18,183	19,855	21,196	22,202	23,312	24,401	25,519	26,432	27,353
Tuvalu	5,512	5,776	5,056	5,452	6,227	6,700	7,140	7,549	7,861	8,149
Uganda	2,760	3,006	3,315	3,498	3,689	3,922	4,158	4,508	4,739	4,983
Ukraine	15,841	18,208	16,514	18,320	19,775	21,007	22,229	23,397	24,396	25,638
United Arab Emirates	67,594	66,592	73,519	76,653	79,208	85,967	83,704	91,517	98,618	105,199
United Kingdom	48,881	54,009	60,180	61,899	63,492	65,758	68,476	71,233	73,541	75,694
United States	64,518	71,426	77,964	82,579	86,417	90,267	95,212	100,208	104,104	107,770
Uruguay	24,909	28,495	31,999	33,500	35,548	37,197	39,008	41,259	43,089	44,912
Uzbekistan	8,669	9,423	10,486	11,323	12,143	13,179	14,421	15,558	16,528	17,500
Vanuatu	3,052	3,083	3,409	3,659	3,806	3,958	4,141	4,307	4,417	4,511
Venezuela	5,121	5,453	6,730	7,357	8,185	9,122	9,902	10,933		
Vietnam	11,668	12,101	13,937	15,064	16,362	17,962	19,974	22,003	23,640	25,360
Palestine	5,608	5,333	5,806	5,825	4,502	4,717				
Yemen	1,602	1,728	1,790	1,635	1,603	1,589	1,571	1,573	1,574	1,581
Zambia	3,157	3,503	3,841	4,083	4,227	4,379	4,650	4,899	5,114	5,344
Zimbabwe	5,203	6,087	6,754	7,202	7,352	7,998	8,499	8,885	9,322	9,692

=== 2030s ===
IMF estimates (2030s)
Country / territory	2030	2031
Afghanistan	2,269	
Albania	36,955	39,104
Algeria	23,298	24,174
Andorra	81,341	82,138
Angola	11,593	11,766
Antigua and Barbuda	37,789	38,902
Argentina	39,952	41,451
Armenia	36,412	39,007
Aruba	69,722	71,847
Australia	84,186	86,474
Austria	88,520	90,502
Azerbaijan	30,698	31,634
Bahamas	53,052	54,652
Bahrain	81,742	84,083
Bangladesh	12,813	13,315
Barbados	30,932	32,014
Belarus	41,769	43,027
Belgium	89,543	92,023
Belize	17,384	17,771
Benin	6,565	6,935
Bhutan	28,056	29,901
Bolivia	13,818	14,267
Bosnia and Herzegovina	30,207	31,747
Botswana	26,090	27,240
Brazil	29,121	30,297
Brunei	116,454	122,045
Bulgaria	55,718	58,472
Burkina Faso	3,903	4,070
Burundi	1,190	1,235
Cape Verde	17,538	18,634
Cambodia	11,202	11,904
Cameroon	7,005	7,264
Canada	80,808	83,005
Central African Republic	2,389	2,439
Chad	4,121	4,302
Chile	43,764	45,422
China	40,678	42,877
Colombia	27,939	29,129
Comoros	4,838	4,994
Democratic Republic of the Congo	2,550	2,649
Republic of the Congo	7,750	7,974
Costa Rica	41,491	43,306
Ivory Coast	10,970	11,554
Croatia	64,899	67,465
Cyprus	80,819	84,046
Czech Republic	76,417	79,312
Denmark	105,607	108,271
Djibouti	12,926	13,734
Dominica	24,498	25,293
Dominican Republic	41,323	43,766
Ecuador	21,059	21,899
Egypt	28,729	29,449
El Salvador	18,368	19,167
Equatorial Guinea	19,556	19,857
Eritrea	1,821	
Estonia	63,883	66,066
Eswatini	16,059	16,705
Ethiopia	6,985	7,530
Fiji	20,446	21,380
Finland	80,018	82,328
France	77,942	80,084
Gabon	29,462	30,189
Gambia	4,684	4,880
Georgia	43,823	46,849
Germany	89,772	92,034
Ghana	11,487	12,066
Greece	55,682	57,735
Grenada	27,829	28,927
Guatemala	19,407	20,249
Guinea	11,384	12,305
Guinea-Bissau	4,235	4,404
Guyana	138,762	141,840
Haiti	3,186	3,247
Honduras	9,862	10,267
Hong Kong	99,931	103,316
Hungary	61,766	64,558
Iceland	91,222	93,177
India	17,965	19,376
Indonesia	24,661	26,197
Iran	23,122	23,763
Iraq	17,557	18,011
Ireland	176,408	182,089
Israel	71,035	73,541
Italy	74,794	76,738
Jamaica	16,565	17,101
Japan	68,396	70,427
Jordan	15,297	15,776
Kazakhstan	59,316	61,896
Kenya	9,945	10,452
Kiribati	4,410	4,511
South Korea	84,509	87,745
Kosovo	27,652	29,229
Kuwait	64,229	65,489
Kyrgyzstan	13,460	14,127
Laos	14,563	15,095
Latvia	54,904	57,086
Lebanon	11,958	
Lesotho	3,661	3,738
Liberia	2,612	2,749
Libya	21,189	21,794
Liechtenstein	220,870	226,009
Lithuania	74,119	77,446
Luxembourg	170,885	173,819
Macau	168,697	173,925
Madagascar	2,498	2,592
Malawi	1,967	2,003
Malaysia	59,084	62,119
Maldives	45,061	46,900
Mali	4,410	4,581
Malta	96,297	100,679
Marshall Islands	10,064	10,512
Mauritania	11,041	11,322
Mauritius	44,540	46,957
Mexico	30,846	31,852
Federated States of Micronesia	7,478	7,657
Moldova	28,060	30,050
Mongolia	28,953	30,597
Montenegro	44,792	46,909
Morocco	15,536	16,319
Mozambique	2,003	2,247
Myanmar	5,981	6,109
Namibia	14,278	14,704
Nauru	14,016	14,393
Nepal	8,776	9,381
Netherlands	99,764	102,282
New Zealand	69,098	71,563
Nicaragua	12,274	12,794
Niger	2,658	2,767
Nigeria	11,922	12,375
North Macedonia	40,369	42,564
Norway	129,400	132,212
Oman	51,772	52,974
Pakistan	8,799	9,177
Palau	25,351	26,453
Panama	58,609	61,581
Papua New Guinea	5,661	5,815
Paraguay	29,355	30,827
Peru	23,938	24,834
Philippines	17,737	18,886
Poland	72,988	76,239
Portugal	62,665	64,898
Puerto Rico	60,947	62,527
Qatar	162,913	170,374
Romania	61,020	64,245
Russia	60,406	62,245
Rwanda	6,184	6,607
Samoa	10,098	10,456
San Marino	99,035	101,730
São Tomé and Príncipe	7,261	7,449
Saudi Arabia	90,828	93,860
Senegal	5,394	
Serbia	45,752	48,555
Seychelles	44,754	46,568
Sierra Leone	4,734	4,935
Singapore	208,100	215,234
Slovakia	60,164	62,533
Slovenia	73,817	76,655
Solomon Islands	3,107	3,198
Somalia	2,205	2,269
South Africa	18,686	19,120
South Sudan	1,838	1,887
Spain	68,084	69,994
Sri Lanka	22,464	23,535
Saint Kitts and Nevis	42,233	44,016
Saint Lucia	33,623	34,500
Saint Vincent and the Grenadines	26,234	27,378
Sudan	3,748	4,013
Suriname	47,991	49,505
Sweden	90,326	93,010
Switzerland	120,780	123,488
Syria	6,375	
Taiwan	130,920	136,337
Tajikistan	8,771	9,276
Tanzania	5,491	5,765
Thailand	33,396	34,877
Timor-Leste	6,279	6,498
Togo	5,294	5,559
Tonga	10,182	10,545
Trinidad and Tobago	43,487	44,847
Tunisia	18,364	18,897
Turkey	58,394	61,406
Turkmenistan	28,303	29,276
Tuvalu	8,428	8,686
Uganda	5,225	5,430
Ukraine	27,128	28,814
United Arab Emirates	109,861	114,421
United Kingdom	77,839	79,967
United States	111,371	114,955
Uruguay	46,786	48,666
Uzbekistan	18,502	19,533
Vanuatu	4,605	4,692
Venezuela	10,933	
Vietnam	27,157	29,070
Palestine	4,717	
Yemen	1,595	1,614
Zambia	5,587	5,834
Zimbabwe	10,072	10,453

== See also ==
- List of countries by GDP (nominal)
- List of countries by GDP (nominal) per capita
- List of countries by past and projected GDP (nominal)
- List of countries by past and projected GDP (nominal) per capita
- List of countries by GDP (PPP)
- List of countries by GDP (PPP) per capita
- List of countries by past and projected GDP (PPP)
- List of countries by real GDP per capita growth

== Sources ==
- "Report for Selected Countries and Subjects". IMF.
