= List of Russian federal subjects by average wage =

Starting from 2020, the median per capita income is calculated in Russia, based on the size of which the subsistence minimum and minimum wage are also calculated. The median salary is the median (average) salary at which half (50%) of workers in Russia or a region receive less than this level, and half (50%) receive more than it. This indicator more accurately reflects the situation than the average monthly salary according to Rosstat (Russian Federal State Statistics Service). So, according to Sberindex in 2020, the median salary for all industries in Russia amounted to 31,540 rubles or $500 per month in January and 38,278 rubles or $520 per month in December. In January 2021, it amounted to 33,549 rubles or $441 per month, in December 2021 - 42,801 rubles or $578 per month. In January 2022, the median salary was 37,429 rubles or $481 per month, in December 2022 - 49,627 rubles or $708.50 per month.

In January 2023, the median salary was 43,500 rubles or $630 per month. In July 2023 was 53,571 rubles ($591.90) per month. On June 16, 2023, Deputy Prime Minister of the Russian Federation Tatyana Golikova, during a speech at the session of the St. Petersburg International Economic Forum (SPIEF-23), reported that about 6 million employed Russians receive salaries below the minimum wage (minimum wage) (below 16,242 rubles or $195.60 per month) and about 12 million Russians work without employment contracts, or contracts of a civil nature (GPH), or the status of self-employed As of April 2023, about half of Russians complain about too low wages and want to get twice as much. Analysts of HeadHunter came to such conclusions. In general, 71% of the country's inhabitants are dissatisfied with their earnings. Only a quarter (26%) of the working population of the Russian Federation is satisfied with the size of the monthly pay . According to VTsIOM polls in 2023, Russians believe that the growth of poverty in Russia (20 million materially, financially poor people in Russia) is due to the unfair distribution of resources, the liquidation of enterprises and social inequality. In Russia, wages are about 39% of GDP, while in most European countries this figure is above 50%.

In recent years, it was believed that low wages are a competitive advantage of the Russian economy, since it is beneficial for doing business, and poverty can be "cured" by payments to vulnerable citizens. But the budget will spend 1.6 trillion rubles only on a single benefit in 2024. "This support measure is not cheap for the state. If the number of recipients of benefits continues to grow, a policy where benefits are the main tool for fighting poverty will become an additional risk to budget stability," Vice-Rector of the Higher School of Economics Lilia Ovcharova warned.

Also the following article is about the average salaries by Russian federal subjects. The article shows the latest data published by Rosstat of June 2022.

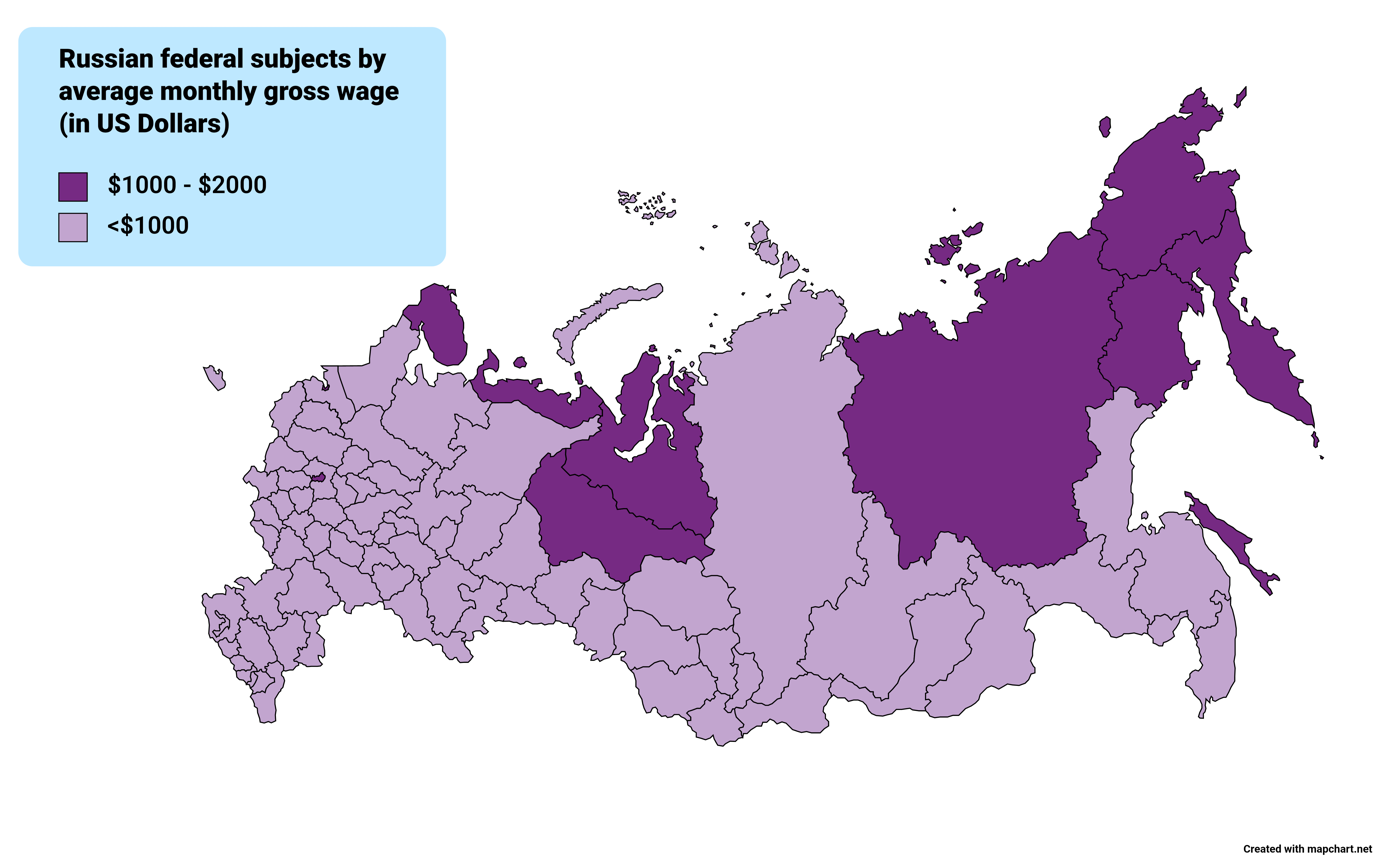
Russian federal subjects by average monthly gross wage (2022)

== List of federal subjects by average monthly gross wage ==
In all regions, wages and expenses for food, housing and communal services are approximately equal. Since the higher the salary in the region, the higher the costs. This does not apply to Moscow: food prices are equal to food prices in other regions with lower wages. Citizens of Russia living in different regions sometimes find themselves in very different conditions. In some areas, due to climatic reasons, the cost of living is much higher, while working and living conditions are much more difficult and are associated with additional burdens on people's health. In this regard, in some regions of the country, a district coefficient is required for wages (surcharge, compensation to an employee for working in difficult climatic conditions or in connection with other costs). These regions include: the southern part of the East Siberian region; Far East; The Far North and regions similar in status to it.

Average salary per month in the regions in beginning of 2023 as published by Rosstat . Since the exchange rate of the ruble against the dollar fluctuates widely, figures in rubles are converted into international dollars using the PPP conversion factor at a rate of 26.67 rubles per international dollar (per the World Bank ).

Note: The rankings are arranged randomly.

	RUB / USD			
PPP conversion factor	23.14	26.89	29.03	29.61
Federal subject	2020	2023	2024	2025
Russia	51,344 / 2,071	74,854 / 2,784	87,952 / 3,030	100,360 / 3,389
Central Federal District				
Moscow	100,070 / 4,324	138,882 5,165	162,572 / 5,600	181,777 / 6,139
Belgorod Oblast	37,442 / 1,618	54,495 / 2,027	65,674 / 2,262	74,887 / 2,529
Bryansk Oblast	31,946 / 1,380	48,080 / 1,788	58,487 / 2,015	67,049 / 2,264
Vladimir Oblast	35,240 / 1,523	53,286 / 1,982	64,721 / 2,229	74,888 / 2,529
Voronezh Oblast	36,317 / 1,569	53,332 / 1,983	63,353 / 2,182	75,525 / 2,550
Ivanovo Oblast	29,083 / 1,257	41,929 / 1,559	49,723 / 1,713	58,174 / 1,965
Kaluga Oblast	43,994 / 1,901	61,588 / 2,290	74,197 / 2,556	86,134 / 2,909
Kostroma Oblast	32,220 / 1,392	46,730 / 1,738	56,898 / 1,960	64,837 / 2,190
Kursk Oblast	35,805 / 1,547	53,624 / 1,994	65,127 / 2,243	75,783 / 2,559
Lipetsk Oblast	36,790 / 1,590	54,044 / 2,010	67,750 / 2,333	77,053 / 2,602
Moscow Oblast	58,066 / 2,509	83,195 / 3,094	99,205 / 3,417	117,139 / 3,956
Oryol Oblast	31,862 / 1,377	47,382 / 1,762	56,134 / 1,934	64,143 / 2,166
Ryazan Oblast	36,459 / 1,575	53,270 / 1,981	64,455 / TBD	74,525 / 2,517
Smolensk Oblast	33,139 / 1,432	49,185 / 1,829	TBD / TBD	70,224 / 2,371
Tambov Oblast	31,063 / 1,342	45,742 / 1,701	TBD / TBD	63,961 / 2,160
Tver Oblast	36,077 / 1,559	53,778 / 2,000	TBD / TBD	73,967 / 2,498
Tula Oblast	40,889 / 1,767	60,464 / 2,249	TBD / TBD	85,812 / 2,898
Yaroslavl Oblast	37,820 / 1,634	55,536 / 2,065	TBD / TBD	75,143 / 2,538
Northwestern Federal District				
Republic of Karelia	46,501 / 2,009	64,779 / 2,409	TBD / TBD	82,438 / 2,784
Komi Republic	57,156 / 2,469	77,061 / 2,886	TBD / TBD	97,935 / 3,307
Nenets Autonomous Okrug	92,237 / 3,985	119,386 / 4,440	TBD / TBD	147,999 / 4,998
Arkhangelsk Oblast	55,891 / 2,415	72,540 / 2,698	TBD / TBD	92,132 / 3,111
Vologda Oblast	42,775 / 1,848	58,939 / 2,192	TBD / TBD	80,997 / 2,735
Kaliningrad Oblast	36,647 / 1,583	54,739 / 2,036	TBD / TBD	78,252 / 2,643
Leningrad Oblast	48,286 / 2,086	68,105 / 2,533	TBD / TBD	96,716 / 3,266
Murmansk Oblast	69,135 / 2,987	98,818 / 3,675	TBD / TBD	126,374 / 4,268
Novgorod Oblast	34,169 / 1,476	53,188 / 1,978	TBD / TBD	72,710 / 2,455
Pskov Oblast	31,496 / 1,361	44,853 / 1,668	TBD / TBD	63,662 / 2,150
Saint Petersburg	68,667 / 2,967	96,232 / 3,579	TBD / TBD	123,341 / 4,165
Southern Federal District				
Adygea	32,161 / 1,390	46,431 / 1,727	TBD / TBD	65,412 / 2,209
Kalmykia	32,013 / 1,383	42,151 / 1,568	TBD / TBD	56,170 / 1,897
Krasnodar Krai	38,499 / 1,663	58,256 / 2,167	TBD / TBD	80,518 / 2,719
Astrakhan Oblast	38,885 / 1,680	53,964 / 2,007	TBD / TBD	70,487 / 2,380
Volgograd Oblast	35,962 / 1,554	51,833 / 1,928	TBD / TBD	69,325 / 2,341
Rostov Oblast	35,622 / 1,539	52,100 / 1,938	TBD / TBD	71,838 / 2,426
Republic of Crimea	34,181 / 1,477	47,325 / 1,760	TBD / TBD	65,259 / 2,204
Sevastopol	36,300 / 1,568	47,638 / 1,772	TBD / TBD	68,084 / 2,299
North Caucasian Federal District				
Dagestan	31,342 / 1,354	39,054 / 1,452	TBD / TBD	50,101 / 1,692
Ingushetia	29,648 / 1,281	35,825 / 1,332	TBD / TBD	44,399 / 1,499
Kabardino-Balkaria	29,899 / 1,292	39,988 / 1,487	TBD / TBD	53,321 / 1,801
Karachay-Cherkessia	29,865 / 1,290	40,388 / 1,502	TBD / TBD	56,074 / 1,894
North Ossetia-Alania	30,479 / 1,317	41,059 / 1,527	TBD / TBD	54,701 / 1,826
Chechnya	29,771 / 1,286	37,589 / 1,398	TBD / TBD	46,404 / 1,567
Stavropol Krai	33,877 / 1,464	47,054 / 1,750	TBD / TBD	66,298 / 2,239
Volga Federal District				
Bashkortostan	38,738 / 1,674	56,974 / 2,119	TBD / TBD	74,398 / 2,512
Mari El	32,278 / 1,395	48,997 / 1,822	TBD / TBD	71,083 / 2,400
Mordovia	31,105 / 1,344	46,406 / 1,726	TBD / TBD	66,837 / 2,257
Tatarstan	39,761 / 1,718	61,894 / 2,302	TBD / TBD	91,495 / 3,090
Udmurtia	36,380 / 1,572	53,721 / 1,998	TBD / TBD	80,571 / 2,721
Chuvashia	31,844 / 1,376	50,263 / 1,869	TBD / TBD	68,742 / 2,321
Perm Krai	41,958 / 1,813	62,393 / 2,320	TBD / TBD	84,931 / 2,868
Kirov Oblast	32,692 / 1,412	48,258 / 1,795	TBD / TBD	67,550 / 2,281
Nizhny Novgorod Oblast	37,601 / 1,625	56,526 / 2,102	TBD / TBD	81,408 / 2,749
Orenburg Oblast	35,075 / 1,515	53,119 / 1,975	TBD / TBD	75,015 / 2,533
Penza Oblast	32,766 / 1,416	48,167 / 1,791	TBD / TBD	67,386 / 2,276
Samara Oblast	38,748 / 1,674	58,063 / 2,159	TBD / TBD	79,036 / 2,669
Saratov Oblast	33,545 / 1,449	49,995 / 1,859	TBD / TBD	67,798 / 2,290
Ulyanovsk Oblast	32,504 / 1,404	48,890 / 1,818	TBD / TBD	70,507 / 2,381
Ural Federal District				
Kurgan Oblast	33,182 / 1,434	50,938 / 1,894	TBD / TBD	73,835 / 2,493
Sverdlovsk Oblast	43,256 / 1,869	64,997 / 2,417	TBD / TBD	89,675 / 3,028
Khanty-Mansi Autonomous Okrug	79,822 / 3,449	108,148 / 4,022	TBD / TBD	137,126 / 4,631
Yamalo-Nenets Autonomous Okrug	111,216 / 4,805	145,050 / 5,394	TBD / TBD	177,972 / 6,010
Tyumen Oblast (excl. autonomous okrugs)	78,619 / 3,397	71,184 / 2,647	TBD / TBD	94,909 / 3,205
Chelyabinsk Oblast	39,349 / 1,700	58,424 / 2,173	TBD / TBD	81,368 / 2,748
Siberian Federal District				
Altai Republic	36,269 / 1,567	52,450 / 1,951	TBD / TBD	75,343 / 2,544
Altai Krai	30,072 / 1,299	46,137 / 1,716	TBD / TBD	65,569 / 2,214
Tuva	44,104 / 1,906	57,793 / 2,149	TBD / TBD	75,703 / 2,556
Khakassia	43,800 / 1,892	62,015 / 2,306	TBD / TBD	80,492 / 2,718
Krasnoyarsk Krai	54,426 / 2,352	81,056 / 3,014	TBD / TBD	106,698 / 3,603
Irkutsk Oblast	49,885 / 2,155	74,257 / 2,762	TBD / TBD	97,366 / 3,288
Kemerovo Oblast	43,429 / 1,876	67,239 / 2,501	TBD / TBD	83,970 / 2,836
Novosibirsk Oblast	41,534 / 1,795	64,189 / 2,387	TBD / TBD	88,684 / 2,995
Omsk Oblast	37,828 / 1,634	55,227 / 2,054	TBD / TBD	74,036 / 2,500
Tomsk Oblast	48,730 / 2,105	67,744 / 2,519	TBD / TBD	89,519 / 3,023
Far Eastern Federal District				
Buryatia	41,800 / 1,806	61,565 / 2,290	TBD / TBD	84,441 / 2,852
Sakha	77,178 / 3,335	110,230 / 4,099	TBD / TBD	141,235 / 4,770
Zabaykalsky Krai	47,172 / 2,038	69,830 / 2,597	TBD / TBD	101,279 / 3,420
Kamchatka Krai	85,623 / 3,699	119,563 / 4,447	TBD / TBD	152,303 / 5,143
Primorsky Krai	50,105 / 2,165	73,960 / 2,751	TBD / TBD	100,836 / 3,405
Khabarovsk Krai	53,113 / 2,295	75,227 / 2,798	TBD / TBD	101,704 / 3,435
Amur Oblast	52,430 / 2,265	72,999 / 2,715	TBD / TBD	99,044 / 3,345
Magadan Oblast	102,843 / 4,443	134,646 / 5,007	TBD / TBD	181,790 / 6,139
Sakhalin Oblast	92,518 / 3,997	114,361 / 4,253	TBD / TBD	147,698 / 4,988
Jewish Autonomous Oblast	46,237 / 1,998	65,815 / 2,448	TBD / TBD	92,434 / 3,122
Chukotka Autonomous Okrug	120,641 / 5,212	159,071 / 5,916	TBD / TBD	217,182 / 7,334
