= Economy of France =

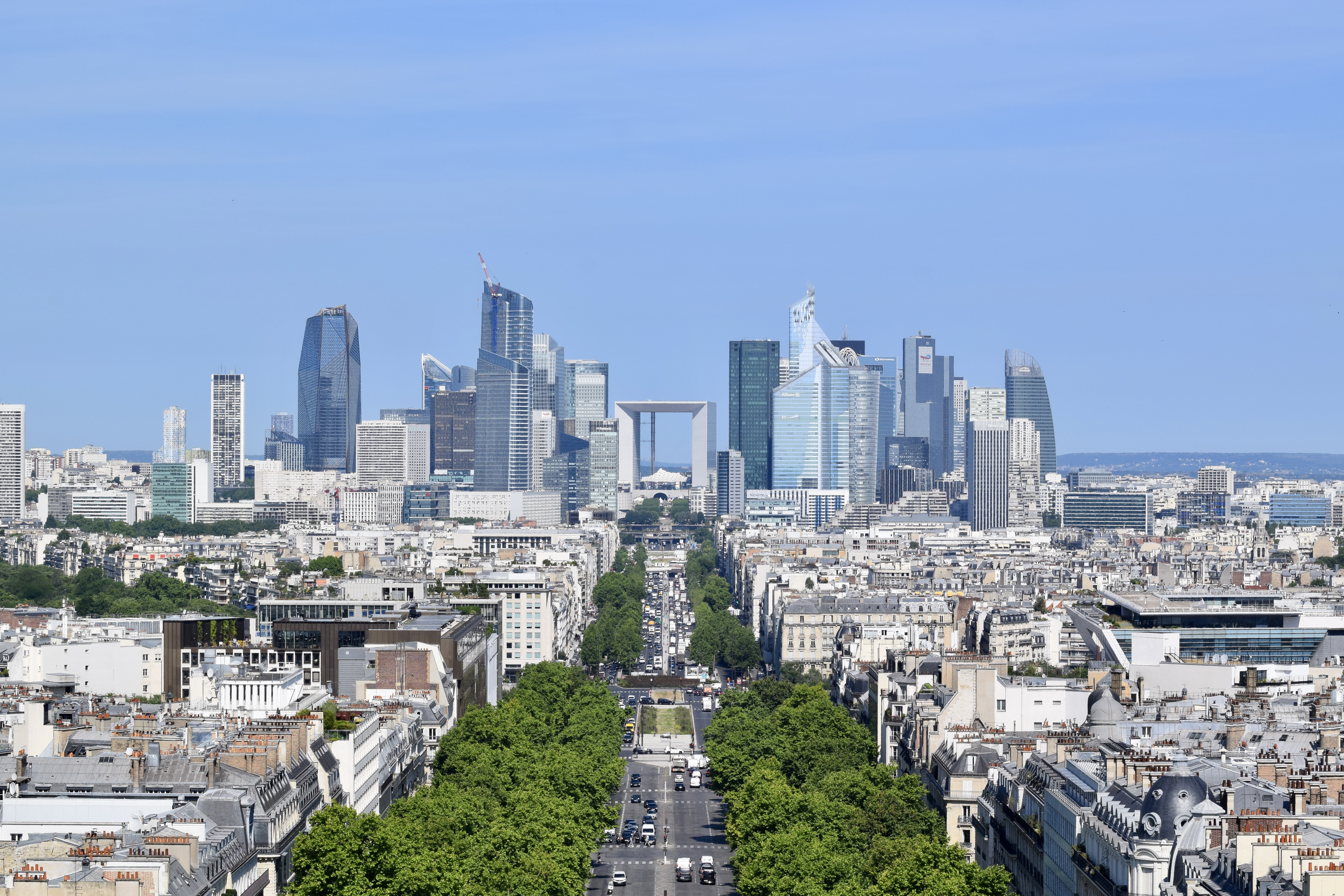
- La Défense in Paris is the financial hub of France and Europe's largest business and economic district.
- Currency: Euro (EUR, €)
- Fiscal year: Calendar year
- Trade organisations: EU, WTO, G-20, G7 and OECD
- Country group: Advanced economy; High-income economy; Welfare state

Statistics
- Population: ▲69,213,000 (2026)
- GDP: ▲$3.60 trillion (nominal; 2026); ▲$4.73 trillion (PPP; 2026)
- GDP rank: 7th (nominal; 2026); 9th (PPP; 2026)
- GDP growth: 1.0% (2026f)
- GDP per capita: ▲$52,083 (nominal; 2026); ▲$68,563 (PPP; 2026)
- GDP per capita rank: 25th (nominal; 2026); 24th (PPP; 2026)
- GDP per capita growth: 0.6% (2025)
- GDP by sector: Agriculture: 1.7%; Industry: 19.5%; Services: 78.8%; (2017 est.)
- Inflation (CPI): ▲1.5% (2026f)
- Population below national poverty line: 5.5% or 13.2% with DOM-TOM; ▲20.5% at risk of poverty or social exclusion (AROPE, 2024)
- Gini coefficient: ▲30.0 medium (2024)
- Human Development Index: ▲0.920 very high (2023, 26th); ▲0.836 very high IHDI (2023, 27th)
- Corruption Perceptions Index: ▼66 out of 100 points (2025) (rank 27th)
- Labour force: ▲31,725,232 (2024, World Bank); ▲75.5% employment rate (2025)
- Labour force by occupation: Agriculture: 2.8%; Industry: 20%; Services: 77.2%; (2016 est.)
- Unemployment: ▲7.7% (March 2026)
- Youth unemployment: ▲18.9% (2025)
- Average gross salary: €3,747 / $4,049 monthly (2024)
- Average net salary: €2,696 / $2,913 monthly (2024)
- Main industries: Machinery; chemicals; automobiles; vehicles; metallurgy; aircraft; defense; electronics; textiles; food processing; tourism; pharmaceutical; food; biotechnology; energy; nuclear energy; beverages; agriculture

External
- Exports: ▲$1.203 trillion (4th; 2024 est.)
- Export goods: Machinery and equipment, aircraft, plastics, chemicals, pharmaceutical products, iron and steel, cement, beverages, foods, transport equipment, high-technology, agricultural products
- Main export partners: Germany 14.8%; Spain 7.7%; Italy 7.5%; United States 7.2%; Belgium 7%; United Kingdom 6.7%; (2017)
- Imports: ▲$1.159 trillion (4th; 2024 est.)
- Import goods: Machinery and equipment, vehicles, crude oil, gas, aircraft, plastics, chemicals, Engineering products, energy products, textiles and clothing
- Main import partners: Germany 18.5%; Belgium 10.2%; Netherlands 8.3%; Italy 7.9%; Spain 7.1%; United Kingdom 5.3%; United States 5.2%; China 5.1%; (2017)
- FDI stock: $1.63 trillions (31 December 2023 est.); Abroad: $2.01 trillion (31 December 2023 est.)
- Current account: ▼ -2.559 billion (2025); ▼ -0.1% of GDP (2025)
- Gross external debt: $5.250 trillion (31 March 2017)

Public finance
- Government debt: ▲116.5% of GDP (2025); ▲$3.913 trillion (2025)
- Foreign reserves: 309 billion euro (February 2023)
- Budget balance: €169.6 billion deficit (2024); ▲ −5.8% of GDP (2024); ▲ −5.4% of GDP (2023)
- Revenue: 51.3% of GDP (2024)
- Spending: 57.1% of GDP (2024)
- Economic aid: €14.4 billion from European Structural and Investment Funds (2007–2013); €26.73 billion from European Structural and Investment Funds (2014–2020)
- Credit rating: Standard & Poor's: AA- (Domestic); AA- (Foreign); A+ (Overall credit); Outlook: Stable; Moody's: Aa3; Outlook: Stable; Fitch: A+; Outlook: Stable; Scope: AA-; Outlook: Negative
- All values, unless otherwise stated, are in US dollars.

France has a highly developed social market economy with strong state participation in strategic sectors. It is the world's seventh-largest economy by nominal GDP and the ninth-largest economy by PPP, constituting around 3% of world GDP. France has a diversified economy, that is dominated by the service sector (which in 2017 represented 78.8% of its GDP), whilst the industrial sector accounted for 19.5% of its GDP and the primary sector accounted for the remaining 1.7%. In 2024, France was the largest Foreign Direct Investment recipient in Europe, and Europe's second-largest spender in research and development. It was ranked among the 10 most innovative countries in the world by the 2020 Bloomberg Innovation Index, as well as the 15th most competitive nation globally according to the 2019 Global Competitiveness Report (up 2 notches compared to 2018). It was the fifth-largest trading nation in the world (and second in Europe after Germany). France is also the most-visited destination in the world, as well as the European Union's leading agricultural power.

According to the International Monetary Fund (IMF), in 2025, France was the world's 25th country by GDP per capita with $48,981 per inhabitant. In 2023, France was listed on the United Nations's Human Development Index with a value of 0.920 (indicating very high human development) and 25th on the Corruption Perceptions Index in 2024. Among OECD members, France has a highly efficient and strong social security system, which comprises roughly 31.7% of GDP.

Paris is a leading global city, and has one of the largest city GDPs in the world. It ranks as the first city in Europe (and 3rd worldwide) by the number of companies classified in Fortune's Fortune Global 500. Paris produced US$738 billion (or US$882 billion at market exchange rates) or around 1/3 of the French economy in 2018 while the economy of the Paris metropolitan area—the largest in Europe with London—generates around 1/3 of France's GDP or around $1.0 trillion. Paris has been ranked as the 2nd most attractive global city in the world in 2019 by KPMG. La Défense, Paris's Central Business District, was ranked by Ernst & Young in 2017 as the leading business district in continental Europe, and fourth in the world. The OECD is headquartered in Paris, the nation's financial capital. The other major economic centres of the country include Lyon, Toulouse (centre of the European aerospace industry), Marseille and Lille.

France's economy entered the recession of the late 2000s later and appeared to leave it earlier than most affected economies, only enduring four-quarters of contraction. However, France experienced stagnant growth between 2012 and 2014, with the economy expanding by 0% in 2012, 0.8% in 2013 and 0.2% in 2014. Growth picked up in 2015 with a growth of 0.8%. This was followed by a growth of 1.1% for 2016, a growth of 2.2% for 2017, and a growth of 2.1% for 2018.

According to INSEE (2021), non-financial and non-agricultural medium-sized firms employed 3 million full-time equivalent employees (24.3% of the workforce), accounted for 27% of investment, 30% of turnover, and 26% of value added, despite accounting for only 1.6% of total firms in France.

== History ==
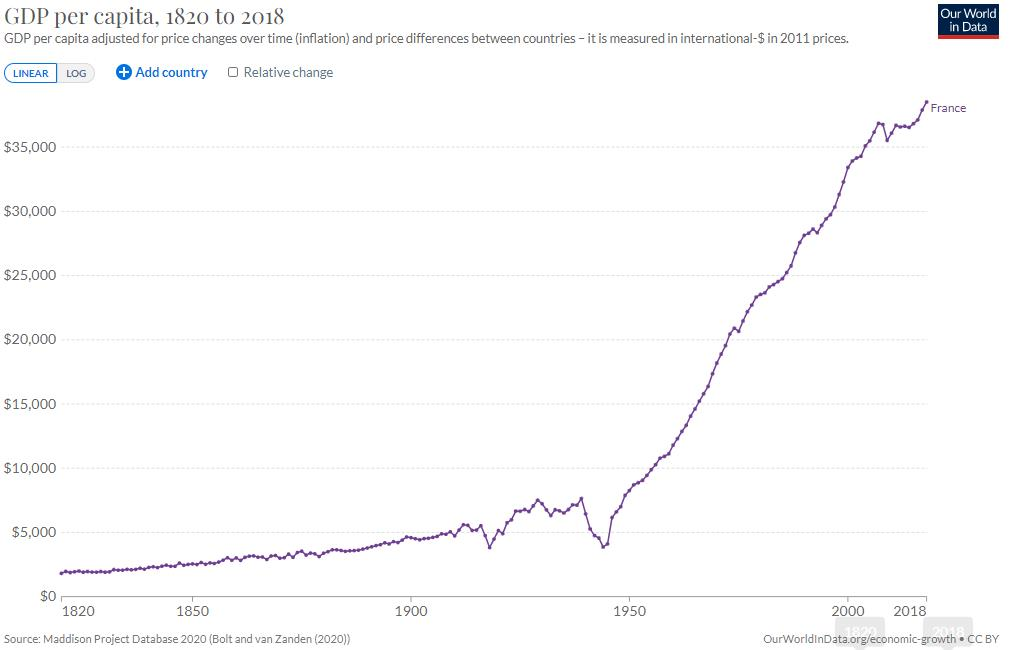
Change in per capita GDP of France, 1820–2018. Figures are inflation-adjusted to 2011 international dollars.

The economic history of France involves major events and trends, including the elaboration and extension of the seigneurial economic system (including the enserfment of peasants) in the medieval Kingdom of France, the development of the French colonial empire in the early modern period, the wide-ranging reforms of the French Revolution and the Napoleonic Era, the competition with the United Kingdom and other neighboring states during industrialization and the extension of imperialism, the total wars of the late-19th and early 20th centuries, and the introduction of the welfare state and integration with the European Union since World War II.

Medieval and early modern France experienced periods of economic growth, as well as challenges such as wars, plagues, and social inequality. The economy relied heavily on agriculture, trade, and the production of luxury goods, and the power and influence of the monarchy played a significant role in shaping economic policies and development. In the late 18th century, French industries faced challenges from competition with England, leading to an industrial depression. The American War of Independence had mixed effects on trade, while the French economy experienced setbacks, including agricultural price reductions and debt accumulation.

France experienced a mix of growth, stagnation, and setbacks during the period from 1789 to 1914. It faced economic challenges related to the French Revolution, Napoleonic wars, protectionism, and industrialization. While France made some advancements in banking and finance, it fell behind other nations in terms of industrial development. Colonialism played a complex role in France's economic and geopolitical landscape. While it provided economic benefits and resources, it also had consequences for the colonized peoples, including exploitation, cultural assimilation, and the suppression of local autonomy.

In 1914-1944, World War I, the interwar period, and the German occupation during World War II had significant impacts on the French economy, resulting in economic challenges, inflation, labor unrest, and hardship for the population.

During the Trente Glorieuses, from 1947 to 1973, France experienced a booming period with an average annual growth rate of 5%. The population grew rapidly, fueled by a high birth rate and declining mortality rate. The economy's growth was driven by productivity gains and increased working hours, as well as investment in targeted industries, regions, and products through indicative planning. The government played a significant role in directing investment and supporting industries of strategic national importance.

During the 1980s France faced economic troubles including a short recession. This led to a shift away from dirigisme, or state intervention, towards a more pragmatic approach. Economic growth resumed later in the decade but was hindered by the economic depression in the early 1990s, which affected the Socialist Party. Jacques Chirac's liberalization measures in the late 1990s strengthened the economy. However, the global economic stagnation after 2005 and the 2008 global crisis had adverse effects on France and the Eurozone, causing difficulties for Nicolas Sarkozy's conservative government.

== Corporations ==
With 31 companies that are part of the world's biggest 500 companies, France was in 2020 the most represented European country in the 2020 Fortune Global 500, ahead of Germany (27 companies) and the UK (22).

As of August 2020, France was also the country that weighed the most on the Eurozone's EURO STOXX 50 (representing 36.4% of all total assets), ahead of Germany (35.2%).

Several French corporations rank amongst the largest in their industries such as Axa in insurance and Air France in air transportation. Luxury and consumer goods are particularly relevant, with L'Oreal being the world's largest cosmetic company while LVMH and Kering are the world's two largest luxury product companies. In energy and utilities, GDF-Suez and EDF are amongst the largest energy companies in the world, and Areva is a large nuclear-energy company; Veolia Environnement is the world's largest environmental services and water management company; Vinci SA, Bouygues and Eiffage are large construction companies; Michelin ranks in the top 3 tire manufacturers; JCDecaux is the world's largest outdoor advertising corporation; BNP Paribas, Credit Agricole and Société Générale rank amongst the largest banks in the world by assets. Capgemini and Atos are among the largest technology consulting companies.

Carrefour is the world's second-largest retail group in terms of revenue; Total is the world's fourth-largest private oil company; Lactalis is the world's largest dairy products group; Sanofi is the world's fifth-largest pharmaceutical company; Publicis is the world's third-largest advertising company; Groupe PSA is the world's 6th and Europe's 2nd largest automaker; Accor is the leading European hotel group; Alstom is one of the world's leading conglomerates in rail transport.

In 2022, the sector with the highest number of companies registered in France is Finance, Insurance, and Real Estate with 2,656,178 companies followed by Services and Retail Trade with 2,090,320 and 549,395 companies respectively.

== Rise and decline of dirigisme ==
France embarked on a programme of modernisation under state coordination. This programme of dirigisme, mostly implemented by governments between 1944 and 1983, involved the state control of certain industries such as transportation, energy and telecommunications as well as various incentives for private corporations to merge or engage in certain projects

The 1981 election of president François Mitterrand saw a short-lived increase in governmental control of the economy, nationalizing many industries and private banks. This form of increased dirigisme, was criticised as early as 1982. By 1983, the government decided to renounce dirigisme and start an era of rigueur ("rigor") or corporation. As a result, the government largely retreated from economic intervention; dirigisme has now essentially receded, though some of its traits remain. The French economy grew and changed under government direction and planning much more than in other European countries.

Despite being a widely liberalised economy, the government continues to play a significant role in the economy: government spending, at 56% of GDP in 2014, is the second-highest in the European Union. Labor conditions and wages are highly regulated. The government continues to own shares in corporations in several sectors, including energy production and distribution, automobiles, aerospace industry, shipbuilding, the arms industry, electronics industry, machine industry, metallurgy, fuels, chemical industry, transportation, and telecommunications.

France has a mixed market economy, with the majority of market activity driven by competitive private firms. However, a significant share of the market is owned by the state. According to France’s National Institute of Statistics and Economic Studies (INSEE), 1,751 French companies were state-controlled by the end of 2017. OECD identified the state-owned primary sectors as energy, transportation, finance, and manufacturing. The state maintains ownership of key sectors to ensure strategic control and prevent private monopolies.

== Government finances ==
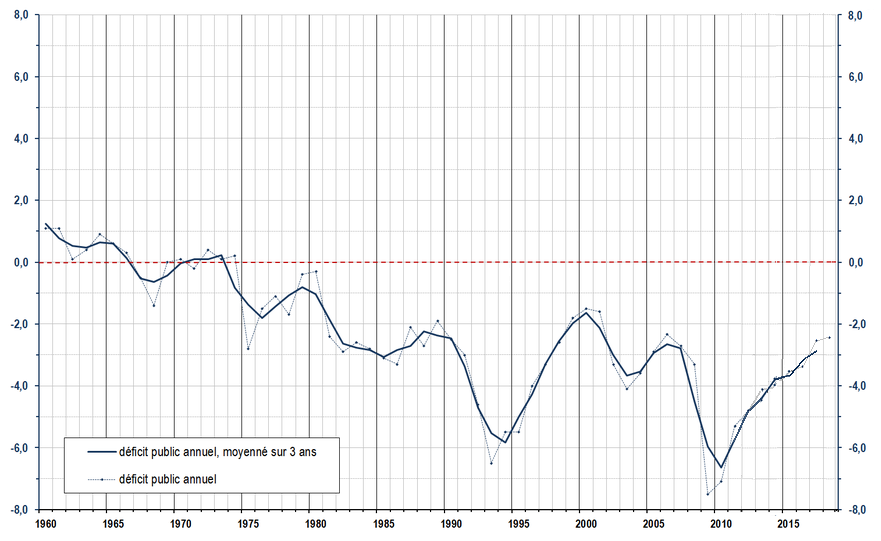
French Government borrowing (budget deficits) as a percentage of GNP, 1960–2009

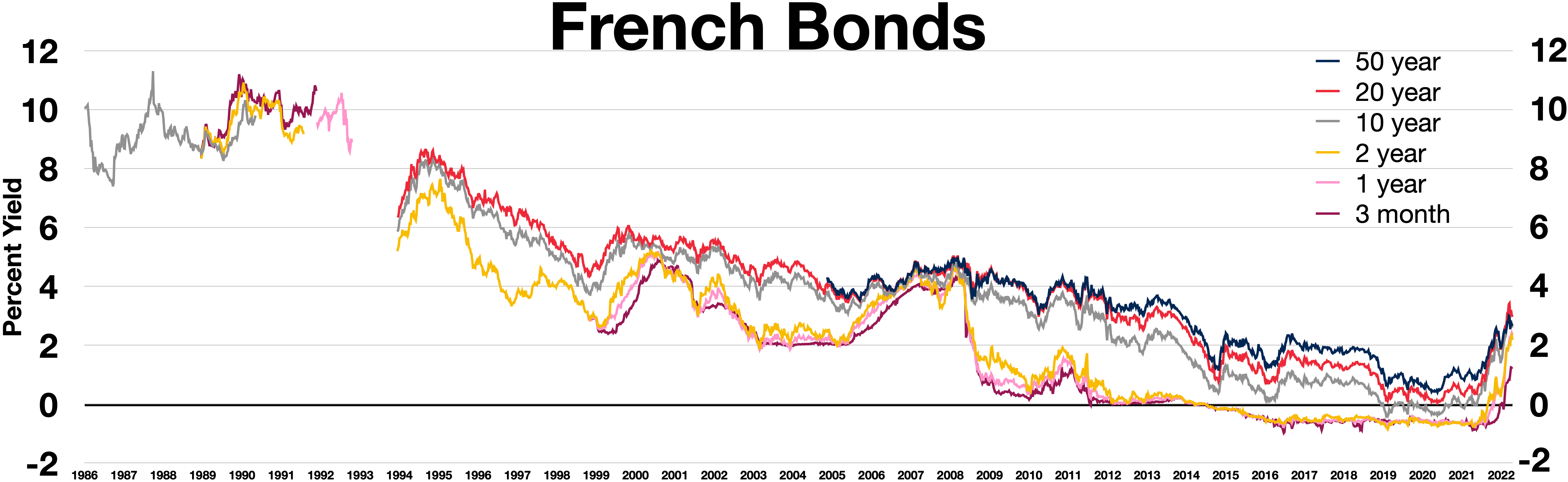
French bonds 50 year 20 year 10 year 2 year 1 year 3 month

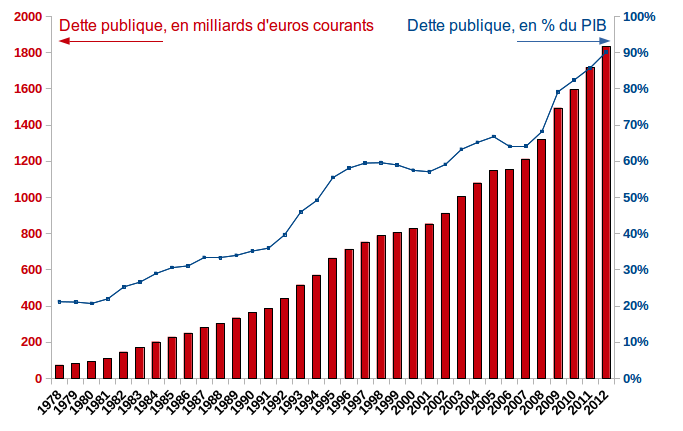
France's public debt from 1978 to 2009

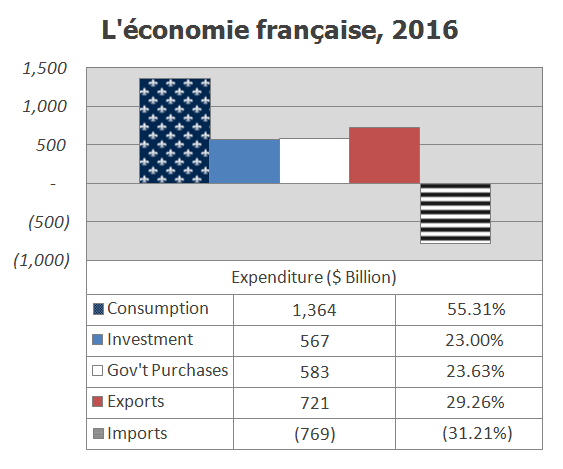
Composition of the French economy (GDP) in 2016 by expenditure type

In April and May 2012, France held a presidential election in which the winner François Hollande had opposed austerity measures, promising to eliminate France's budget deficit by 2017. The new government stated that it aimed to cancel recently enacted tax cuts and exemptions for the wealthy, raising the top tax bracket rate to 75% on incomes over a million euros, restoring the retirement age to 60 with a full pension for those who have worked 42 years, restoring 60,000 jobs recently cut from public education, regulating rent increases; and building additional public housing for the poor.

In June 2012, Hollande's Socialist Party won an overall majority in the legislative elections, giving it the capability to amend the French Constitution and allowing immediate enactment of the promised reforms. French government bond interest rates fell 30% to record lows, less than 50 basis points above German government bond rates.

Hollande's successor as President of France, Emmanuel Macron, a centrist politician, took office in May 2017. His aim was to revive the euro zone’s second-largest economy.

In July 2020, during the COVID-19 pandemic, the French government issued 10-years bonds which had negative interest rates, for the first time in its history (which means that investors buying French bonds will pay, rather than receive, interest for owning French sovereign debt).

France possesses in 2020 the fourth-largest gold reserves in the world.

Macron vowed in May 2023 to build factories, boost job creations and make France more independent, shaked by pension protests.

=== Central bank and currency ===
In March 2026, the Bank of France reported that it had completed a program to upgrade 129 metric tons of its gold reserves—approximately 5% of the total—by selling non-standard gold held in New York and purchasing compliant bars now stored in Paris, generating a one-off capital gain of nearly €13 billion due to high gold prices. The transaction occurred during the 2026 Iran war, which drove gold prices to record highs. The Bank of France stated that the decision was not politically motivated but was based on European market standards for gold trading.

=== National debt ===
The Government of France has run a budget deficit each year since the early 1970s. As of 2021, French government debt reached an equivalent of 118.6% of French GDP.

Under European Union rules, member states are supposed to limit their debt to 60% of output or be reducing the ratio structurally towards this ceiling, and run public deficits of no more than 3.0% of GDP.

In late 2012, credit-rating agencies warned that growing French government debt levels risked France's AAA credit rating, raising the possibility of a future credit downgrade and subsequent higher borrowing costs for the French government. In 2012 France was downgraded by ratings agencies Moody's, Standard & Poor's (S&P), and Fitch to an AA+ credit rating.

In December 2014 France's credit rating was further downgraded by Fitch and S&P to AA.

Macron, shaken by pension protests, vowed in May 2023 to build factories, boost job creations and make France more independent.

The Government of France experienced a significant shift in its bond market position on September 26, 2024, when its bond yield surpassed that of Spain for the first time since 2007. The yield on 10-year French bonds reached 2.97%, slightly exceeding the yield on Spanish bonds of similar maturity, despite France's typically higher credit rating. This development raised concerns among investors about France's ability to manage its public finances effectively. France's bond yields were reported to be higher than those of Portugal and approaching levels seen in Italy and Greece, countries traditionally viewed as having higher economic risks in the Eurozone.

Furthermore, France faces a budget crisis in 2024, with the deficit at risk of exceeding 6% of GDP, significantly higher than the previous government's estimate of 5.1%. Newly appointed Finance Minister Antoine Armand and Budget Minister Laurent Saint-Martin pledged to focus on spending cuts before considering tax increases to address the fiscal shortfall. Prime Minister Michel Barnier was tasked with finalizing the 2025 budget within days, amidst pressure to present realistic plans for deficit reduction.

In September 2026, French 10-year government bond yields rose above 4.13% reaching their highest level since 2008, amid concerns over France's rising public debt, political deadlock and uncertainty surrounding the 2027 budget.

=== Welfare ===
Welfare in France (also known as social protection, from French: Protection sociale) includes all systems whose purpose is to protect people against the financial consequences of social risks (illness, maternity, old age, unemployment).

Social welfare refers to all the mechanisms of collective foresight, enabling individuals to cope with the financial consequences of "social risks". These are situations that could jeopardize the economic security of the individual or their family (defined as a group of people bound by ties of lineage and alliance), causing a decline in its resources or increase its expenditure (old age, sickness, disability, unemployment, maternity, family responsibilities, etc.). In France, the welfare system make up for about 500 billion euros annually, or more than 30% of GDP.

The origin of social protection in France dates back to medieval times, with fraternal benefit societies. In the second half of the nineteenth century, systems of social assistance developed gradually, often launched by employers marked by social Catholicism, then relayed by the first laws. In 1930, modern social insurance was created, offering employees protection against certain risks: accidents, sickness, disability, maternity, old age, death ... During the Second World War, the National Council of Resistance designed the system of social security, now at the heart of social protection. It was created just after the Liberation, by an order of 4 October 1945, followed by other texts. Gradually, protection has covered the entire population, while the benefits extend.

When creating Social Security, France imitated more the Bismarckian system (insurance for workers) than the Beveridge one (widespread solidarity). Over the years, the solidarity (as opposed to a system of contributions) has gradually developed in the French system, which the foundation remains the concept of insurance. However, the desire to establish a universal system has faced opposition. This explains why the French welfare system is plural, with a wide variety of actors. The most important is the general scheme for employees of industry, commerce and services.

== Data ==
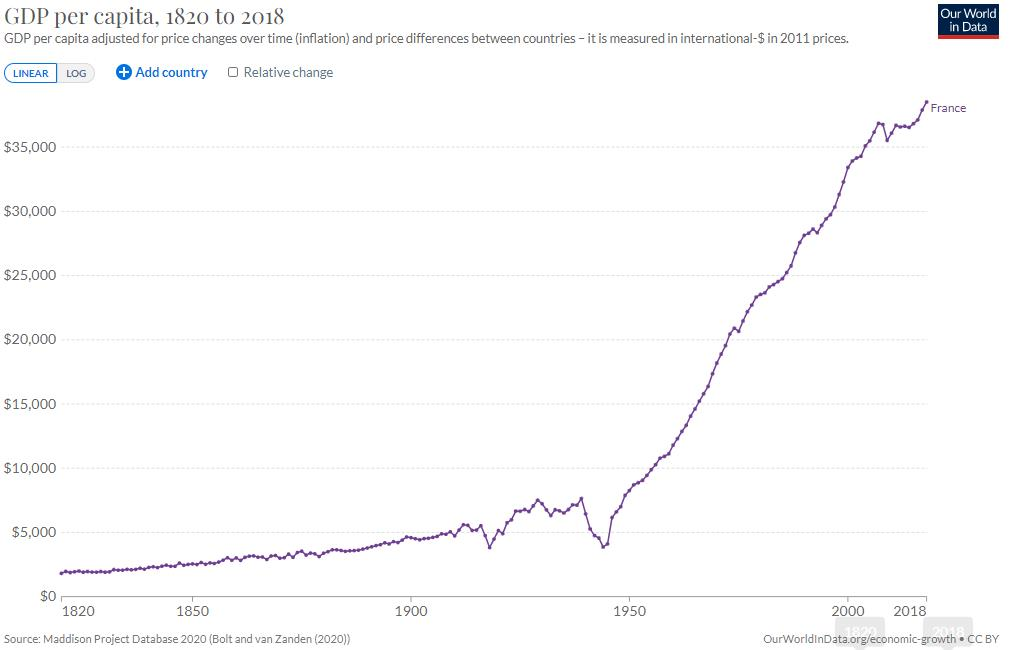
Change in per capita GDP of France, 1820–2018. Figures are inflation-adjusted to 2011 International dollars.

The following table shows the main economic indicators in 1980–2025 (with IMF staff estimates in 2026–2031). Inflation below 5% is in green.

Year	GDP (in bn. US$PPP)	GDP per capita (in US$PPP)	GDP (in bn. US$nominal)	GDP per capita (in US$ nominal)	GDP growth (real)	Inflation rate (% per annum)	Unemployment rate	Government debt (% of GDP)
1980	592.7	10,758.6	695.5	12,623.9	▲1.8%	▲13.1%	6.3%	21.3%
1981	▲656.5	▲11,850.6	▼612.6	▼11,057.5	▲1.2%	▲13.3%	▲7.4%	▲22.6%
1982	▲713.8	▲12,812.7	▼581.3	▼10,433.4	▲2.4%	▲12.0%	▲8.1%	▲26.2%
1983	▲751.1	▲13,404.9	▼556.0	▼9,921.8	▲1.3%	▲9.5%	▼7.4%	▲27.7%
1984	▲791.3	▲14,058.1	▼526.7	▼9,357.2	▲1.7%	▲7.7%	▲8.5%	▲30.2%
1985	▲829.9	▲14,674.6	▲551.6	▲9,753.4	▲1.7%	▲5.8%	▲8.7%	▲31.9%
1986	▲866.3	▲15,248.0	▲766.3	▲13,487.8	▲2.3%	▲2.5%	▲8.9%	▲32.4%
1987	▲910.6	▲15,949.1	▲927.3	▲16,241.5	▲2.6%	▲3.3%	▲9.2%	▲34.8%
1988	▲986.7	▲17,194.9	▲1,012.8	▲17,650.4	▲4.7%	▲2.7%	▼8.8%	▼34.7%
1989	▲1,072.4	▲18,587.6	▲1,017.7	▼17,639.4	▲4.6%	▲6.6%	▼8.7%	▲35.5%
1990	▲1,143.6	▲19,714.1	▲1,260.9	▲21,735.5	▲2.8%	▲0.3%	▼8.4%	▲36.8%
1991	▲1,197.6	▲20,548.4	▲1,263.2	▼21,675.4	▲1.3%	▲3.4%	▲8.6%	▲37.8%
1992	▲1,242.1	▲21,206.7	▲1,392.6	▲23,775.5	▲1.4%	▲2.5%	▲9.4%	▲41.7%
1993	▲1,266.1	▲21,513.9	▼1,315.8	▼22,357.7	▼-0.4%	▲2.2%	▲10.3%	▲48.2%
1994	▲1,324.2	▲22,418.2	▲1,388.5	▲23,505.6	▲2.4%	▲1.7%	▲10.7%	▲51.6%
1995	▲1,385.2	▲23,367.3	▲1,596.3	▲26,927.0	▲2.5%	▲1.8%	▼10.5%	▲57.8%
1996	▲1,429.6	▲24,031.7	▲1,599.2	▼26,883.8	▲1.3%	▲2.1%	▲10.8%	▲60.6%
1997	▲1,490.8	▲24,975.4	▼1,451.1	▼24,309.4	▲2.5%	▲1.3%	▲10.9%	▲62.0%
1998	▲1,559.8	▲26,040.7	▲1,499.0	▲25,024.9	▲3.5%	▲0.7%	▼10.7%	▲62.1%
1999	▲1,633.5	▲27,169.1	▼1,488.4	▼24,755.9	▲3.3%	▲0.6%	▼10.4%	▼61.4%
2000	▲1,743.5	▲28,814.2	▼1,361.6	▼22,502.1	▲4.4%	▲1.8%	▼9.2%	▼59.7%
2001	▲1,815.5	▲29,790.9	▲1,370.4	▼22,486.9	▲1.8%	▲1.8%	▼8.5%	▼59.3%
2002	▲1,864.5	▲30,373.6	▲1,491.4	▲24,295.4	▲1.1%	▲1.9%	▼8.3%	▲61.3%
2003	▲1,920.1	▲31,057.3	▲1,834.6	▲29,675.1	▲1.0%	▲2.2%	▲8.5%	▲65.4%
2004	▲2,021.4	▲32,471.5	▲2,108.8	▲33,876.3	▲2.5%	▲2.3%	▲8.9%	▲66.9%
2005	▲2,126.2	▲33,894.2	▲2,193.4	▲34,964.8	▲2.0%	▲1.9%	8.9%	▲68.2%
2006	▲2,256.1	▲35,705.9	▲2,318.0	▲36,685.0	▲2.9%	▲1.9%	8.9%	▼65.4%
2007	▲2,374.7	▲37,337.4	▲2,656.1	▲41,762.6	▲2.5%	▲1.6%	▼8.0%	▲65.5%
2008	▲2,426.7	▲37,940.5	▲2,926.5	▲45,753.6	▲0.3%	▲3.2%	▼7.4%	▲69.8%
2009	▼2,375.2	▼36,936.4	▼2,697.1	▼41,943.3	▼-2.7%	▲0.1%	▲9.1%	▲84.1%
2010	▲2,448.2	▲37,890.1	▼2,648.4	▼40,988.6	▲1.8%	▲1.7%	▲9.3%	▲86.3%
2011	▲2,560.7	▲39,436.2	▲2,869.9	▲44,197.6	▲2.5%	▲2.3%	▼9.2%	▲88.7%
2012	▲2,614.3	▲40,071.8	▼2,684.7	▼41,150.5	▲0.2%	▲2.2%	▲9.8%	▲91.7%
2013	▲2,683.6	▲40,930.2	▲2,816.1	▲42,951.7	▲0.9%	▲1.0%	▲10.3%	▲94.6%
2014	▲2,757.6	▲41,698.5	▲2,862.0	▲43,277.4	▲1.0%	▲0.6%	10.3%	▲96.2%
2015	▲2,810.9	▲42,319.1	▼2,442.7	▼36,775.7	▲1.0%	▲0.1%	10.3%	▲97.0%
2016	▲2,858.6	▲42,919.6	▲2,469.7	▲37,081.5	▲0.7%	▲0.3%	▼10.1%	▲98.2%
2017	▲2,975.8	▲44,564.8	▲2,588.0	▲38,756.7	▲2.3%	▲1.2%	▼9.4%	▲98.8%
2018	▲3,114.9	▲46,496.1	▲2,782.8	▲41,539.8	▲1.6%	▲2.1%	▼9.0%	▼98.5%
2019	▲3,445.3	▲51,224.8	▼2,723.1	▼40,487.3	▲2.1%	▲1.3%	▼8.4%	▼98.2%
2020	▼3,345.0	▼49,598.7	▼2,645.8	▼39,230.9	▼-7.6%	▲0.5%	▼8.0%	▲114.9%
2021	▲3,656.8	▲54,017.1	▲2,968.4	▲43,848.3	▲6.8%	▲2.1%	▼7.9%	▼112.8%
2022	▲4,027.6	▲59,177.7	▼2,797.0	▼41,095.8	▲2.8%	▲5.9%	▼7.3%	▼111.4%
2023	▲4,254.6	▲62,198.0	▲3,065.0	▲44,806.9	▲1.8%	▲5.7%	7.3%	▼109.5%
2024	▲4,425.8	▲64,479.8	▲3,177.8	▲46,298.3	▲1.4%	▲2.3%	▲7.4%	▲112.6%
2025	▲4,582.7	▲66,558.7	▲3,382.6	▲49,128.5	▲0.9%	▲0.9%	▲7.7%	▲115.5%
2026e	▲4,756.4	▲68,851.6	▲3,554.2	▲51,448.4	▲0.4%	▲2.4%	▲8.4%	▲118.5%
2027e	▲4,941.6	▲71,342.3	▲3,649.0	▲52,681.2	▲0.7%	▲2.2%	▼8.3%	▲120.4%
2028e	▲5,105.2	▲73,583.0	▲3,747.4	▲54,012.2	▲1.2%	▲1.9%	▼7.9%	▲121.7%
2029e	▲5,261.6	▲75,753.8	▲3,856.0	▲55,517.0	▲1.1%	▲1.9%	▼7.7%	▲122.6%
2030e	▲5,419.0	▲77,942.4	▲3,968.8	▲57,082.9	▲1.1%	▲1.9%	▼7.6%	▲123.2%
2031e	▲5,572.7	▲80,084.0	▲4,069.4	▲58,480.2	▲1.1%	▲1.8%	▼7.5%	▲123.6%

== Economic sectors ==
=== Industry ===
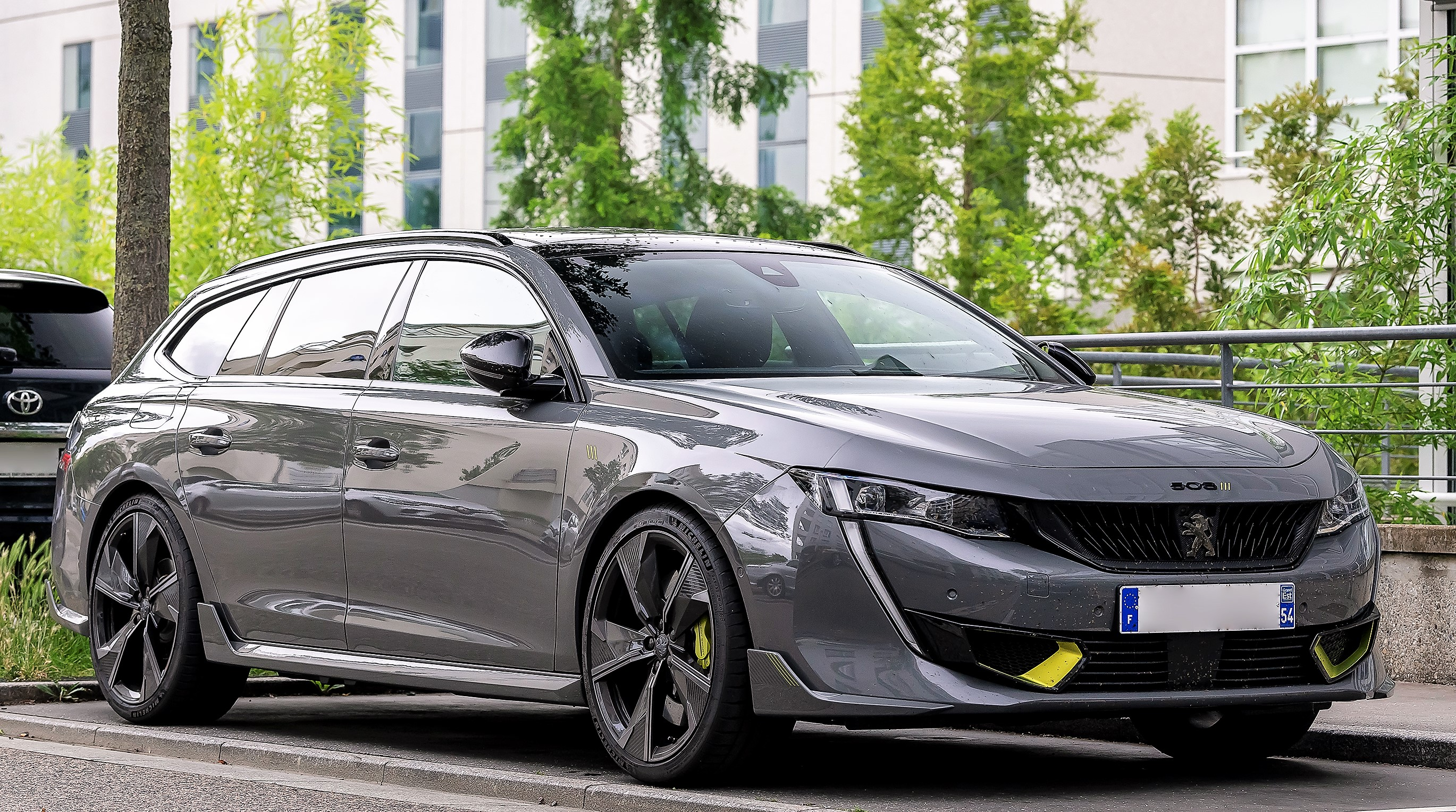
A Peugeot 508 SW

In 2019, France was the world's 8th largest manufacturer in terms of value added, according to the World Bank.

The leading industrial sectors in France are telecommunications (including communication satellites), aerospace and defence, ship building, pharmaceuticals, construction and civil engineering, chemicals, textiles, and automobile production. The chemical industry is a key sector for France, helping to develop other manufacturing activities and contributing to economic growth.

Research and development spending is also high in France at 2.26% of GDP, the fourth-highest in the OECD.

Industry contributes to French exports: as of 2018, the Observatory of Economic Complexity estimates that France's largest exports "are led by planes, helicopters, and spacecraft ($43.8 billion), cars ($26 billion), packaged medicaments ($25.7 billion), vehicle parts ($16.5 billion), and gas turbines ($14.4 billion)."

In December 2023, industrial production in France experienced its most significant change since May of the same year, with a notable increase of 1.1%.

=== Energy ===
2021 electricity production of France
1. Nuclear power (68.4%)
2. Renewable energy (22.5%)
3. Fossil fuel power (8.60%)
4. Other (0.50%)

France is the world-leading country in nuclear energy, home of global energy giants Areva, EDF and GDF Suez: nuclear power now accounts for about 78% of the country's electricity production, up from only 8% in 1973, 24% in 1980, and 75% in 1990. Nuclear waste is stored on site at reprocessing facilities. Due to its heavy investment in nuclear power, France is the smallest emitter of carbon dioxide among the seven most industrialised countries in the world. Due to its overwhelming reliance on nuclear power, renewable energies have seen relatively little growth compared to other Western countries.

In 2006, electricity generated in France amounted to 548.8 TWh, of which:

- 428.7 TWh (78.1%) were produced by nuclear power generation
- 60.9 TWh (11.1%) were produced by hydroelectric power generation
- 52.4 TWh (9.5%) were produced by fossil-fuel power generation
  - 21.6 TWh (3.9%) by coal power
  - 20.9 TWh (3.8%) by natural-gas power
  - 9.9 TWh (1.8%) by other fossil fuel generation (fuel oil and gases by-products of industry such as blast furnace gases)
- 6.9 TWh (1.3%) were produced by other types of power generation (essentially waste-to-energy and wind turbines)
  - The electricity produced by wind turbines increased from 0.596 TWh in 2004, to 0.963 TWh in 2005, and 2.15 TWh in 2006, but this still accounted only for 0.4% of the total production of electricity (as of 2006).

In November 2004, EDF (which stands for Electricité de France), one of the world's largest utility company and France's largest electricity provider, was floated with huge success on the French stock market. However, the French state still retains 70% of the capital. Other electricity providers include Compagnie nationale du Rhône (CNR) and Endesa (through SNET).

=== Agriculture ===
Development of agricultural output of France in 2015 US$ since 1961

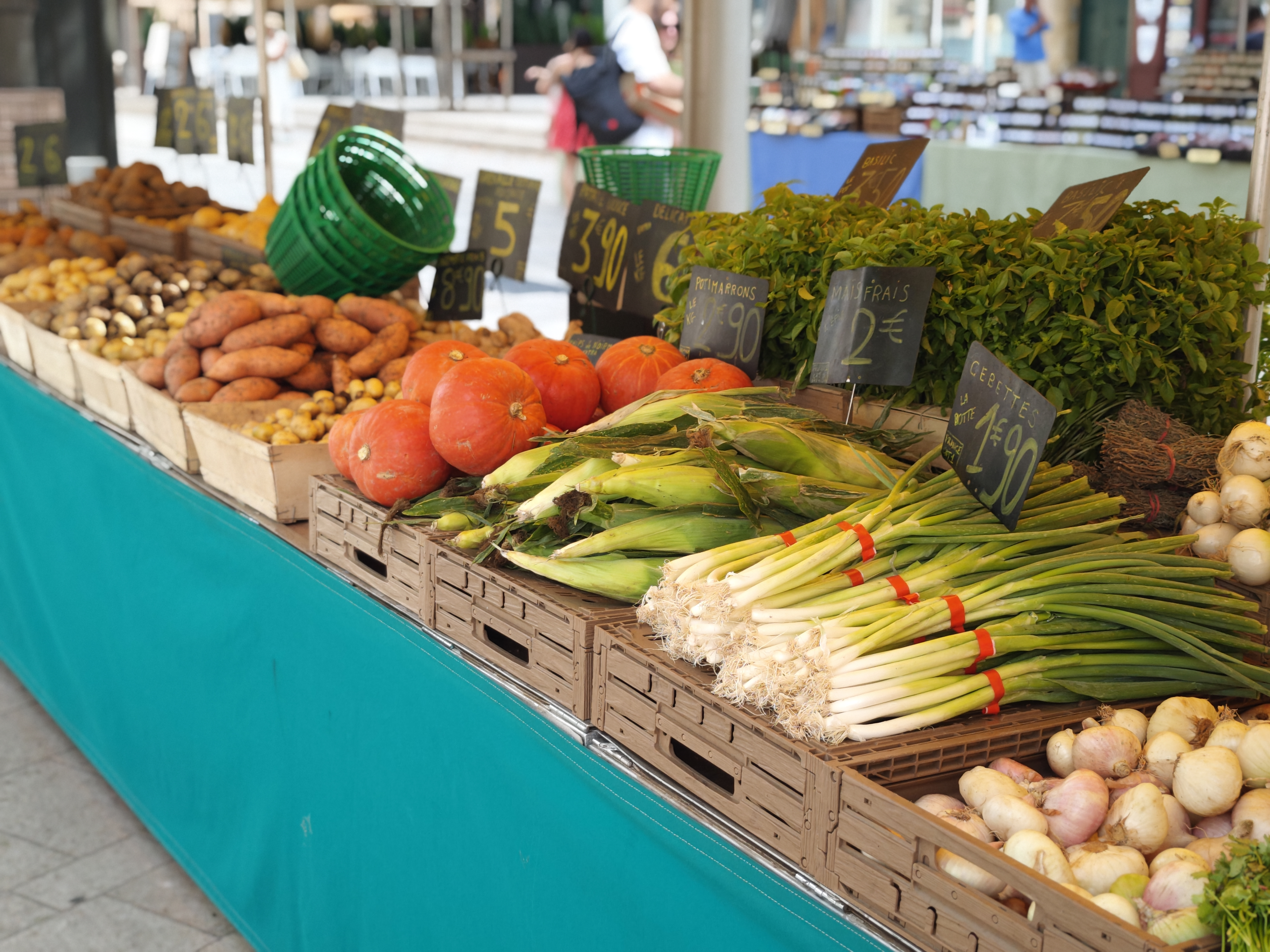
Fresh vegetables displayed for sale at an outdoor market in France.

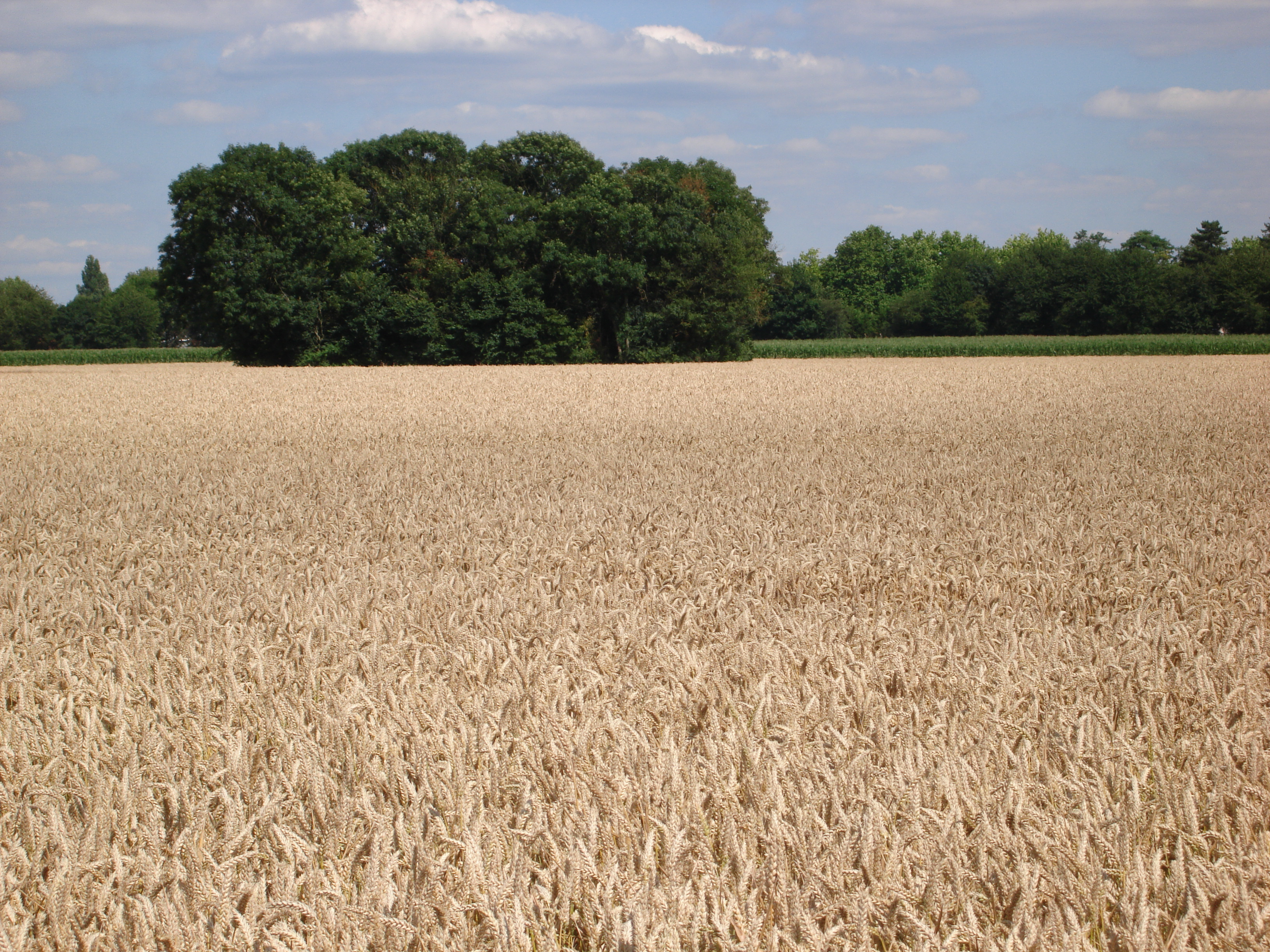
A wheat field in Villiers-le-Bâcle. France is the EU's largest agricultural producer.

France is the world's sixth-largest agricultural producer and EU's leading agricultural power, accounting for about one-third of all agricultural land within the EU. In the early 1980s, France was the leading producer of the three principal grains of wheat, barley, and maize. Back in 1983, France produced around 24.8 million tonnes, ahead of the United Kingdom and West Germany, the next two largest wheat producers.

Northern France is characterised by large wheat farms. Dairy products, pork, poultry, and apple production are concentrated in the western region. Beef production is located in central France, while the production of fruits, vegetables, and wine ranges from central to southern France. France is a large producer of many agricultural products and is currently expanding its forestry and fishery industries. The implementation of the Common Agricultural Policy (CAP) and the Uruguay Round of the General Agreement on Tariffs and Trade (GATT) have resulted in reforms in the agricultural sector of the economy.

As the world's second-largest agricultural exporter, France ranks just after the United States. The destination of 49% of its exports is other EU members states. France also provides agricultural exports to many poor African countries (including its former colonies) which face serious food shortages. Wheat, beef, pork, poultry, and dairy products are the principal exports.

Exports from the United States face stiff competition from domestic production, other EU member states, and third-world countries in France. US agricultural exports to France, totaling some $600 million annually, consist primarily of soybeans and soybean products, feeds and fodders, seafood, and consumer products, especially snack foods and nuts. French exports to the United States are much more high-value products such as its cheese, processed products and its wine.

The French agricultural sector receives almost €11 billion in EU subsidies. France produced in 2018 39.5 million tons of sugar beet (2nd largest producer in the world, just behind Russia), which serves to produce sugar and ethanol; 35.8 million tons of wheat (5th largest producer in the world); 12.6 million tons of maize (11th largest producer in the world); 11.2 million tons of barley (2nd largest producer in the world, only behind Russia); 7.8 million tons of potato (8th largest producer in the world); 6.2 million tons of grape (5th largest producer in the world); 4.9 million tons of rapeseed (4th largest producer in the world, behind Canada, China and India); 2.2 million tons of sugarcane; 1.7 million tons of apple (9th largest producer in the world); 1.3 million tons of triticale (4th largest producer in the world, only behind Poland, Germany and Belarus); 1.2 million tons of sunflower seed (9th largest producer in the world); 712 thousand tons of tomatoes; 660 thousand tons of linen; 615 thousand tons of dry pea; 535 thousand tons of carrot; 427 thousand tons of oats; 400 thousand tons of soy; in addition to smaller productions of other agricultural products.

=== Mining ===
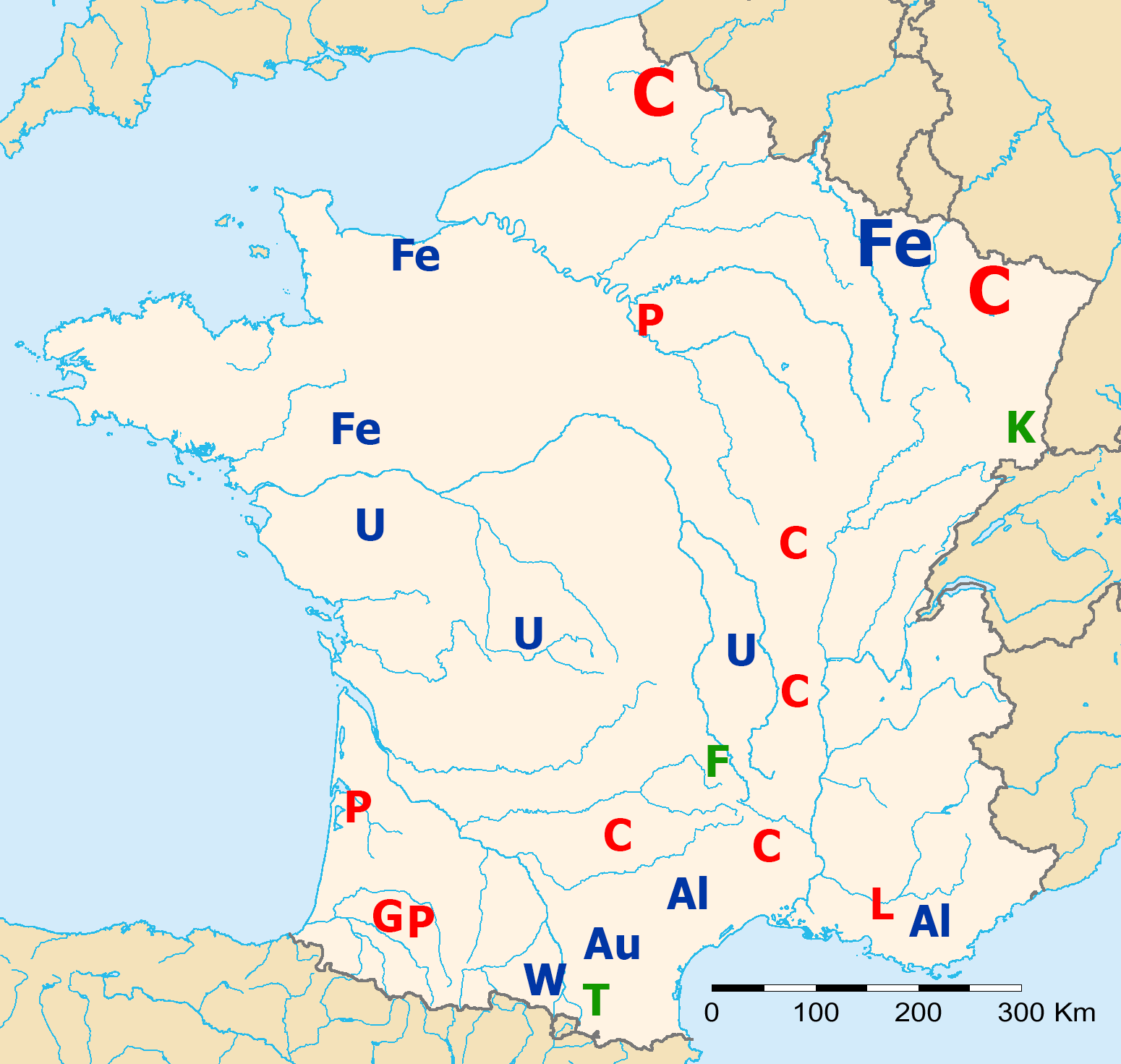
Natural resources of France: Al – Aluminium, Fe – Iron, W – Tungsten, Au – Gold, U – Uranium, C – Coal, L – Lignite, P – Petroleum, G – Natural gas, F – Fluorine, K – Potash, T – Talc.

Mining in France is based solely on the nature of the material, whether extracted from the surface or underground. These include fuels (coal, hydrocarbons, gas), metals (iron, copper) and a few other minerals (salt, sulfur).

The inventory of mining resources is relatively well known for surface and subsurface deposits. It is less well known for deep-seated resources, and needs to be regularly updated to take into account the discovery of new resources and the depletion of certain deposits.

Products not included in the list of mines are referred to as quarries, and include building materials such as sand, clay, gypsum and limestone. They are subject to ICPE (installations classées pour la protection de l'environnement) legislation.

While, under the French Civil Code, the subsoil belongs to the owner of the soil, the management of the mining subsoil is the responsibility of the State, which may grant a concession to a mining company.

Mining always leaves its mark on the environment and human health, particularly when it comes to metal and metalloid deposits, and especially in naturally acidic regions prone to runoff, and even more so in the case of acid mine drainage.

Major mines and deposits also exist overseas, including in French Guiana and New Caledonia.

=== Arms industry ===
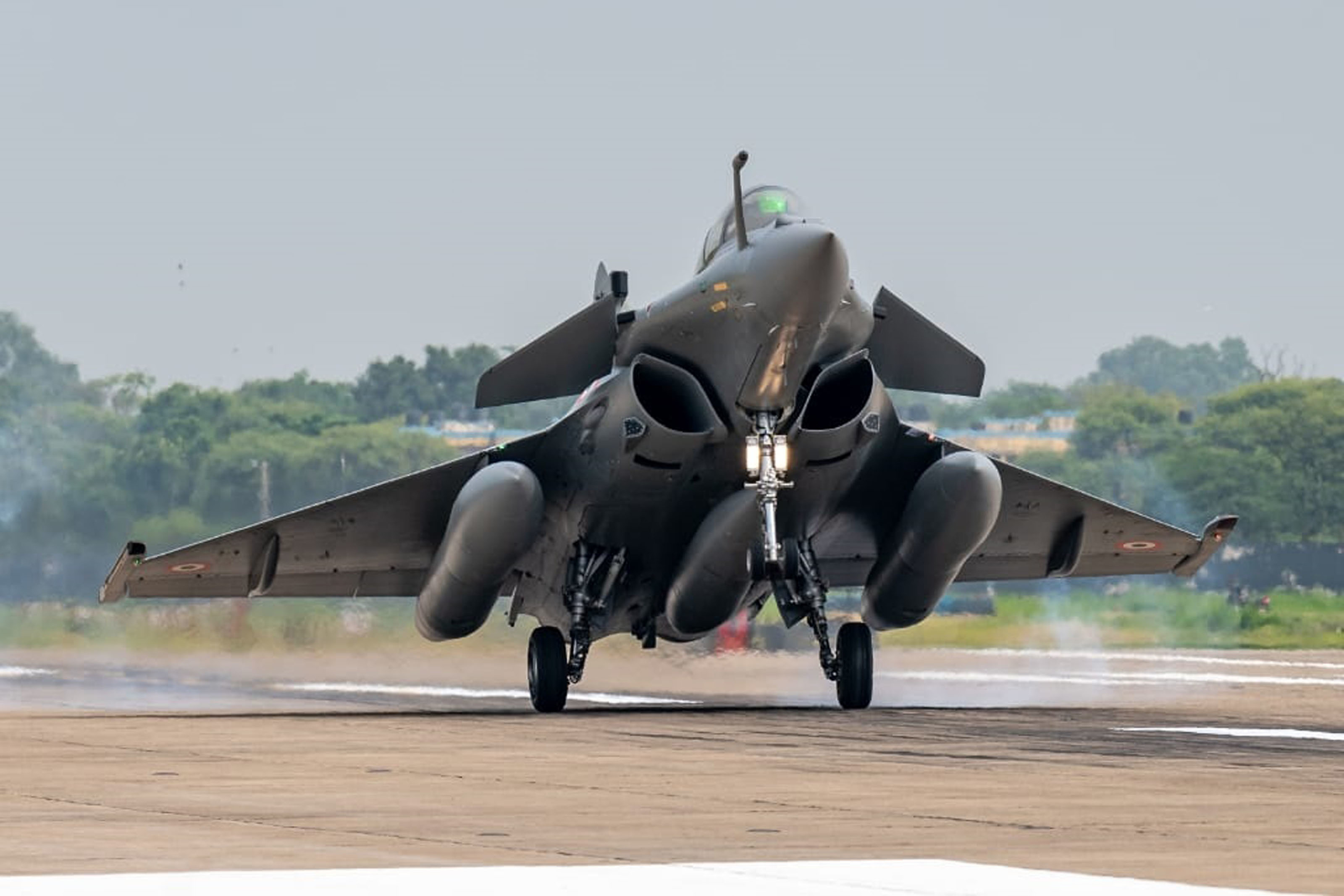
Dassault Rafale

The French government is the French arms industry's main customer, mainly buying warships, guns, nuclear weapons and equipment.

During the 2000–2015 period, France was the fourth largest weapons exporter in the world.

French manufacturers export great quantities of weaponry to Saudi Arabia, the United Arab Emirates, Brazil, Greece, India, Pakistan, Taiwan, Singapore and many others. It was reported that in 2015, French arms sales internationally amounted to 17.4 billion U.S. dollars, more than double the figure of 2014.

=== Fashion and luxury goods ===
According to 2017 data compiled by Deloitte, Louis Vuitton Moet Hennessey (LVMH), a French brand, is the largest luxury company in the world by sales, selling more than twice the amount of its nearest competitor. Moreover, France also possesses 3 of the top 10 luxury goods companies by sales (LVMH, Kering SA, L'Oréal), more than any other country in the world.

Paris is considered one of the world's foremost fashion capitals, or even "the world's fashion capital". The French tradition for haute couture has been estimated to start as early as the era of Louis XIV, the Sun King.

=== Housing and real estate ===
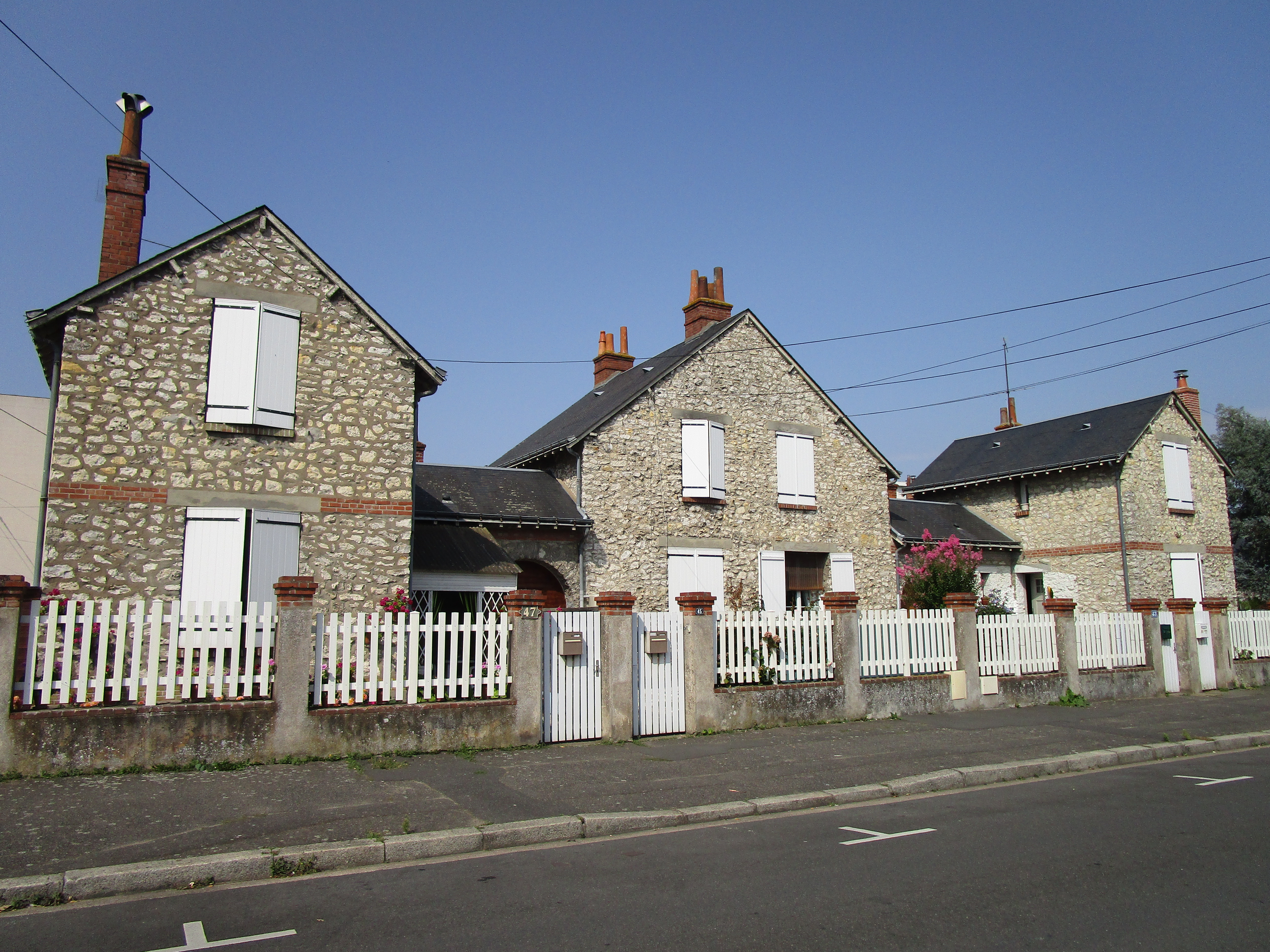
Workers' housing estate in the Giraudeau district of Tours, built in 1924.

Social housing in France is housing intended, following a public or private initiative, for people whose income does not exceed certain limits within the working and middle classes. The term encompasses the construction, occupancy, and management of this housing stock. It contributes to public housing policy and social economy policies that govern its administration. In other countries, social housing has similar objectives.

Social housing is a compromise between a precursor to “Fordism” outlined from the late 19th century to ease tensions in the labor world, the realization of a republican project to ensure greater de facto equality among citizens through legislation, and a modern project in the fields of urban planning, architecture, construction, and social engineering in the 20th century.

Social housing accounts for 17% of France’s total housing stock in 2013:.

According to a study by the Banque des Territoires in 2025, building new or renovated social housing seems impossible given the budgetary equation in France.

=== Education ===
Education in France is organised in a highly centralised manner, with many subdivisions. It is divided into the three stages of primary education (enseignement primaire), secondary education (enseignement secondaire), and higher education (enseignement supérieur). In French higher education, the following degrees are recognised by the Bologna Process (EU recognition): Licence and Licence Professionnelle (bachelor's degrees), and the comparably named Master and Doctorat degrees.

The Programme for International Student Assessment coordinated by the OECD currently ranks the overall knowledge and skills of French 15-year-olds as 26th in the world in reading literacy, mathematics, and science, near the OECD average of 493. France's performance in mathematics and science at the middle school level was ranked 23 in the 1995 Trends in International Math and Science Study.

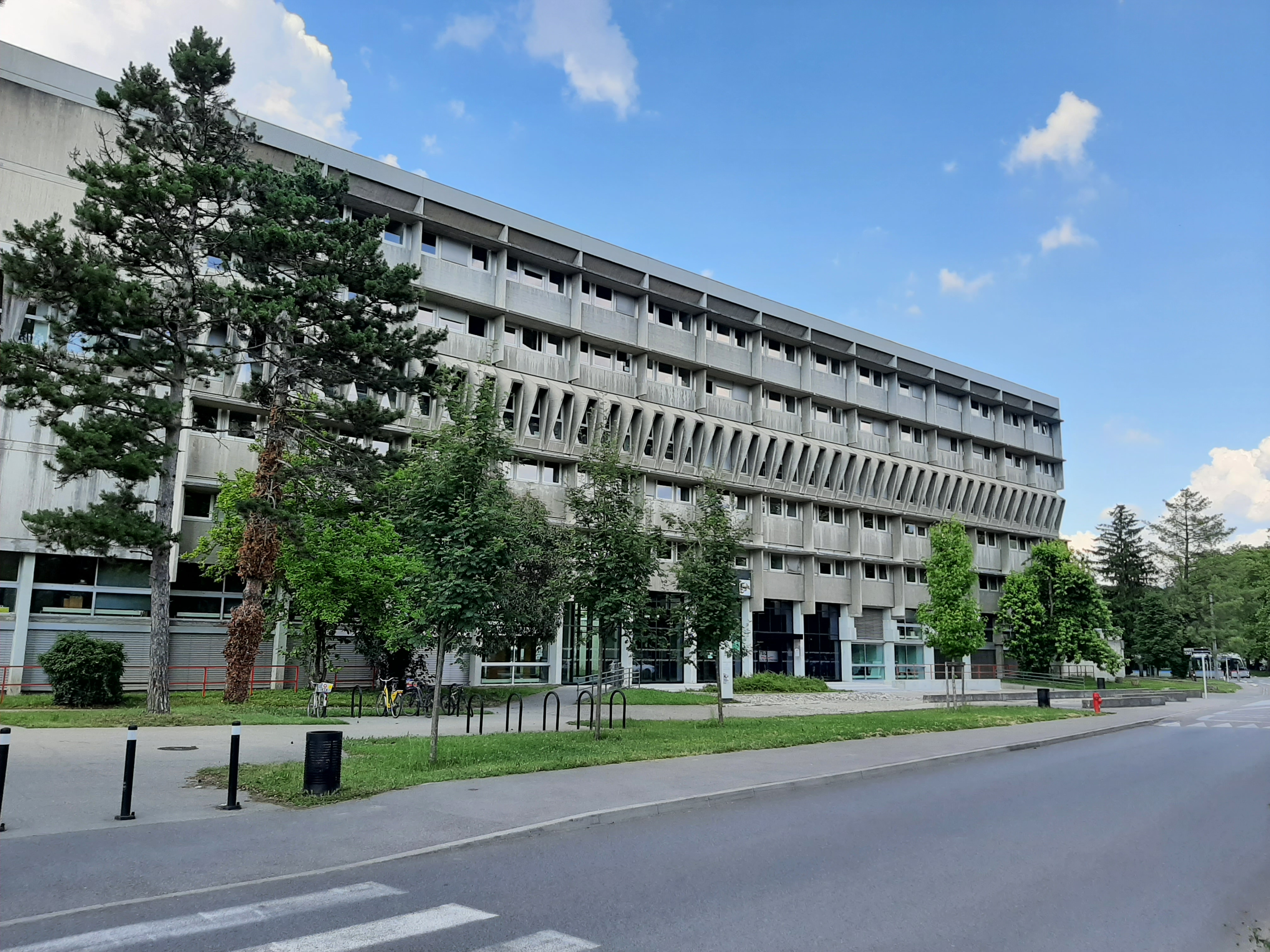
Grenoble Alpes University, the third largest university in France with about 60,000 students and over 3,000 researchers

The OECD also found that students in France reported greater concern about discipline and behaviour at school and in classrooms, much more than the rest of Europe. This was higher than all OECD countries. School principals reported higher staff and material shortage in France, higher than OECD averages. About 7% of French teachers believe the teaching profession is highly valued in France and in society. School principals noted regular acts of violence and bullying among their students, higher than averages. The time spent of teaching time spent on keeping classes in good order is one of the largest in France, among all OECD countries studied. France also has a high drop out rate.

Pupils can take apprenticeships to enter the labour market with the Baccalauréat Technologique. It allows pupils pursue short and technical studies (laboratory, design and applied arts, hotel and restaurant, management etc).

Higher education in France was reshaped by the student revolts of May 1968. During the 1960s, French public universities responded to a massive explosion in the number of students (280,000 in 1962–63 to 500,000 in 1967–68) by stuffing approximately one-third of their students into hastily developed campus annexes (roughly equivalent to American satellite campuses) which lacked decent amenities, resident professors, academic traditions, or the dignity of university status. This is why the French higher education economy performs poorly compared with other high-performing countries such as England or Australia. France also hosts various catholic universities recognised by the state, the largest one being Lille Catholic University, as well branch colleges of foreign universities. They include Baruch College, the University of London Institute in Paris, Parsons Paris School of Art and Design and the American University of Paris. Eighteen million pupils and students are in the education system, over 2.4 million of whom are in higher education.

=== Healthcare ===
The French health care system is one of universal health care largely financed by government national health insurance. In 2017, France spent 11.3% of GDP on health care, or US$5,370 per capita, a figure higher than the average spent by rich countries (OECD average is 8.8%, 2017), though similar to Germany (10.6%) and Canada (10%), but much less than in the US (17.1%, 2018). Approximately 77% of health expenditures are covered by government-funded agencies.

Most general physicians are in private practice but draw their income from the public insurance funds. These funds, unlike their German counterparts, have never gained self-management responsibility. Instead, the government has taken responsibility for the financial and operational management of health insurance (by setting premium levels related to income and determining the prices of goods and services refunded). The French government generally refunds patients 70% of most health care costs, and 100% in case of costly or long-term ailments. Supplemental coverage may be bought from private insurers, most of them nonprofit, mutual insurers. Until 2000, coverage was restricted to those who contributed to social security (generally, workers or retirees), excluding some poor segments of the population. The government of Lionel Jospin put into place universal health coverage and extended the coverage to all those legally resident in France. Only about 3.7% of hospital treatment costs are reimbursed through private insurance, but a much higher share of the cost of spectacles and prostheses (21.9%), drugs (18.6%) and dental care (35.9%) (figures from the year 2000). There are public hospitals, non-profit independent hospitals (which are linked to the public system), as well as private for-profit hospitals.

=== Retail and hospitality ===
The large-scale retail sector in France consists of "hypermarkets and companies classified as large specialized retailers."

In 2014, the food retail industry employed 603,137 people.

In France, the hypermarket chains include: E.Leclerc, Carrefour, Intermarché Hyper, Hyper U, Auchan, and Casino. As of 2016, there were more than 2,000 hypermarkets and 10,000 supermarkets in the country, generating approximately €110 billion in revenue.

The distribution channels in this sector are highly diverse. In addition to supermarket operators like Intermarché Super, Carrefour Market, E.Leclerc Express, Super U, Casino Supermarché, SPAR Supermarché, Match, or Auchan Supermarché, other players operating in the hard-discount segment, such as Lidl, Aldi Nord, Netto, Leader Price, Supeco, and Norma, as well as shopping malls, generalist chains, and specialized brands.

=== Science and technology ===
Science and technology in France has a long history dating back to the Académie des Sciences, founded by Louis XIV in 1666, at the suggestion of Jean-Baptiste Colbert, to encourage and protect the spirit of French scientific research. France's achievements in science and technology have been significant throughout the past centuries as France's economic growth and industrialisation process was slow and steady along the 18th and 19th centuries. Research and development efforts form an integral part of the country's economy.

Scientific research in the country is supported by industry, by the network of French universities and by higher education establishments outside the main framework, Grandes écoles.

France ranked 13th in the 2025 Global Innovation Index, and remained in the same position in the 2026 index.

=== Telecommunications and media ===
Telecommunications in France are highly developed. France is served by an extensive system of automatic telephone exchanges connected by modern networks of fiber-optic cable, coaxial cable, microwave radio relay, and a domestic satellite system; cellular telephone service is widely available, expanding rapidly, and includes roaming service to foreign countries.

=== Tourism ===
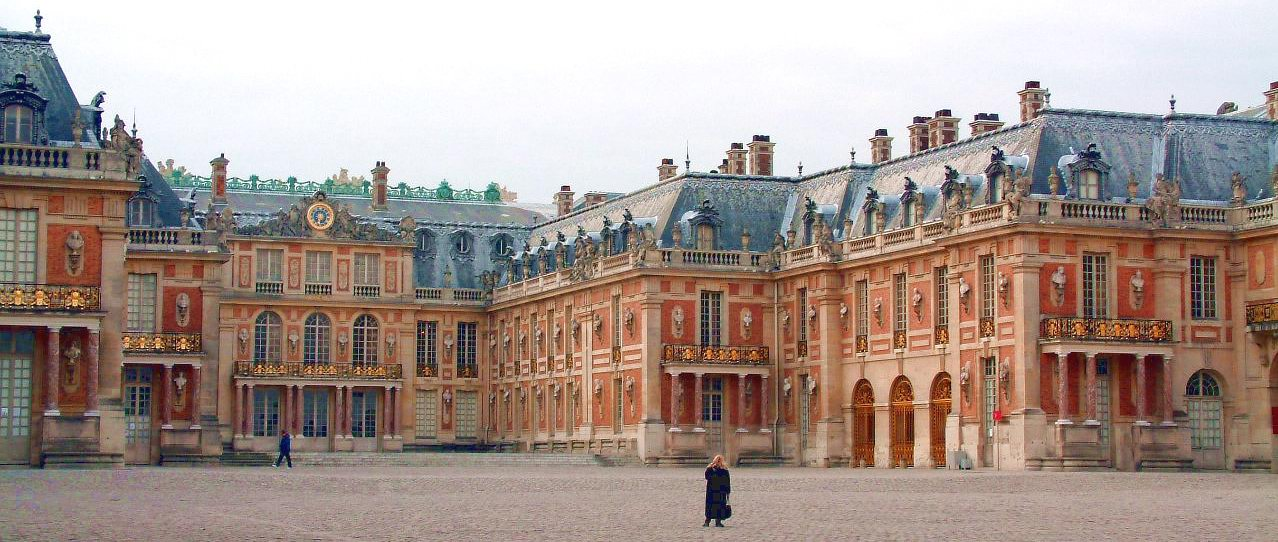
The Palace of Versailles is one of the most popular tourist destinations in France.

France remained the world's most visited tourist destination in 2025, receiving 102 million international tourists, up from 100 million in 2024. International tourism revenue reached a record €77.5 billion, while more than 5 million visitors came from the United States.

According to figures from 2003, some popular tourist sites include (in visitors per year): Eiffel Tower (6.2 million), Louvre Museum (5.7 million), Palace of Versailles (2.8 million), Cité des Sciences et de l'Industrie (2.6 million), Musée d'Orsay (2.1 million), Arc de Triomphe (1.2 million), Centre Pompidou (1.2 million), Mont-Saint-Michel (1 million), Château de Chambord (711,000), Sainte-Chapelle (683,000), Château du Haut-Kœnigsbourg (549,000), Puy de Dôme (500,000), Musée Picasso (441,000), Carcassonne (362,000). However, the most popular site in France is Disneyland Paris, with 9.7 million visitors in 2017

=== Transport ===
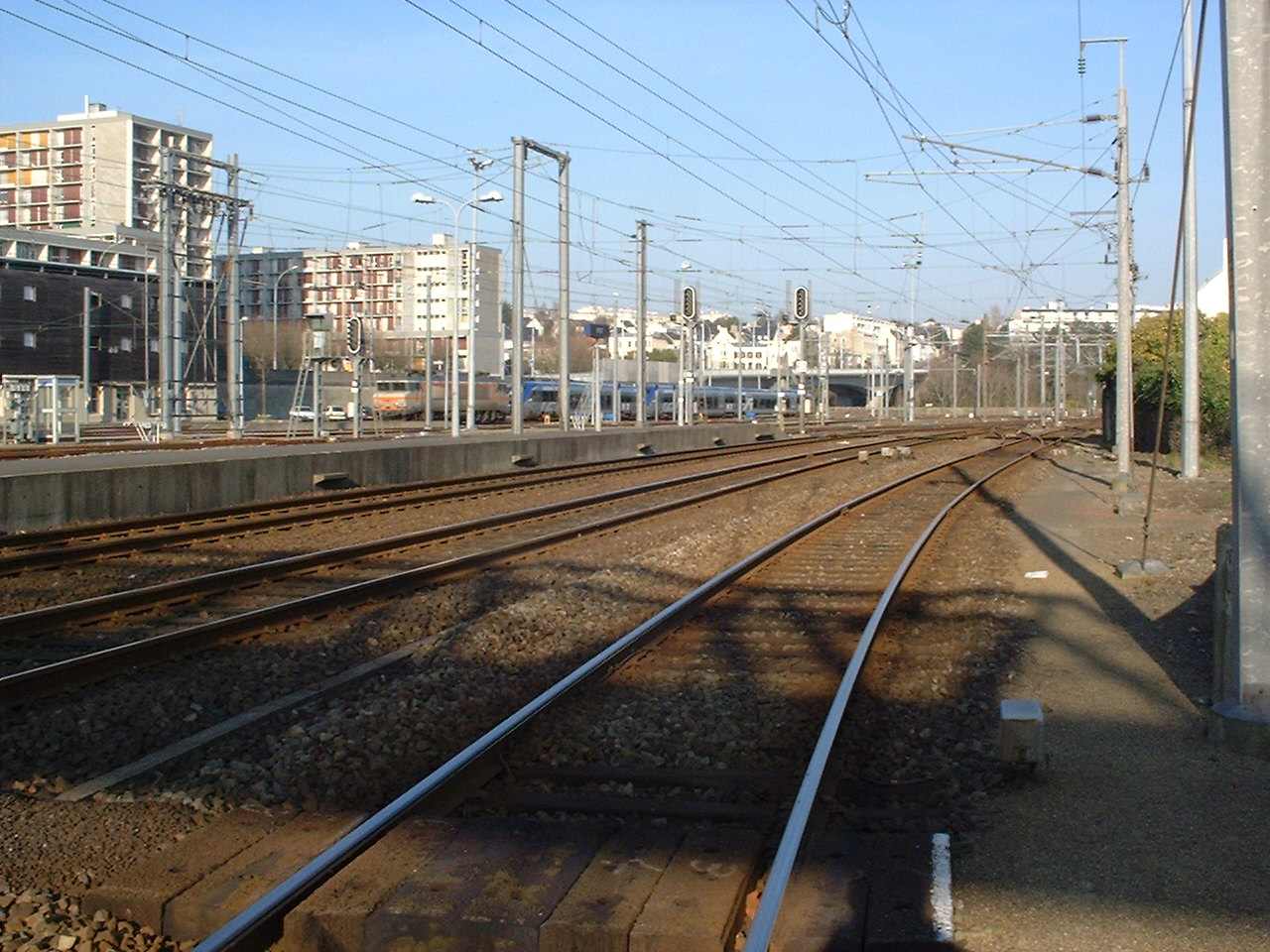
Brest station

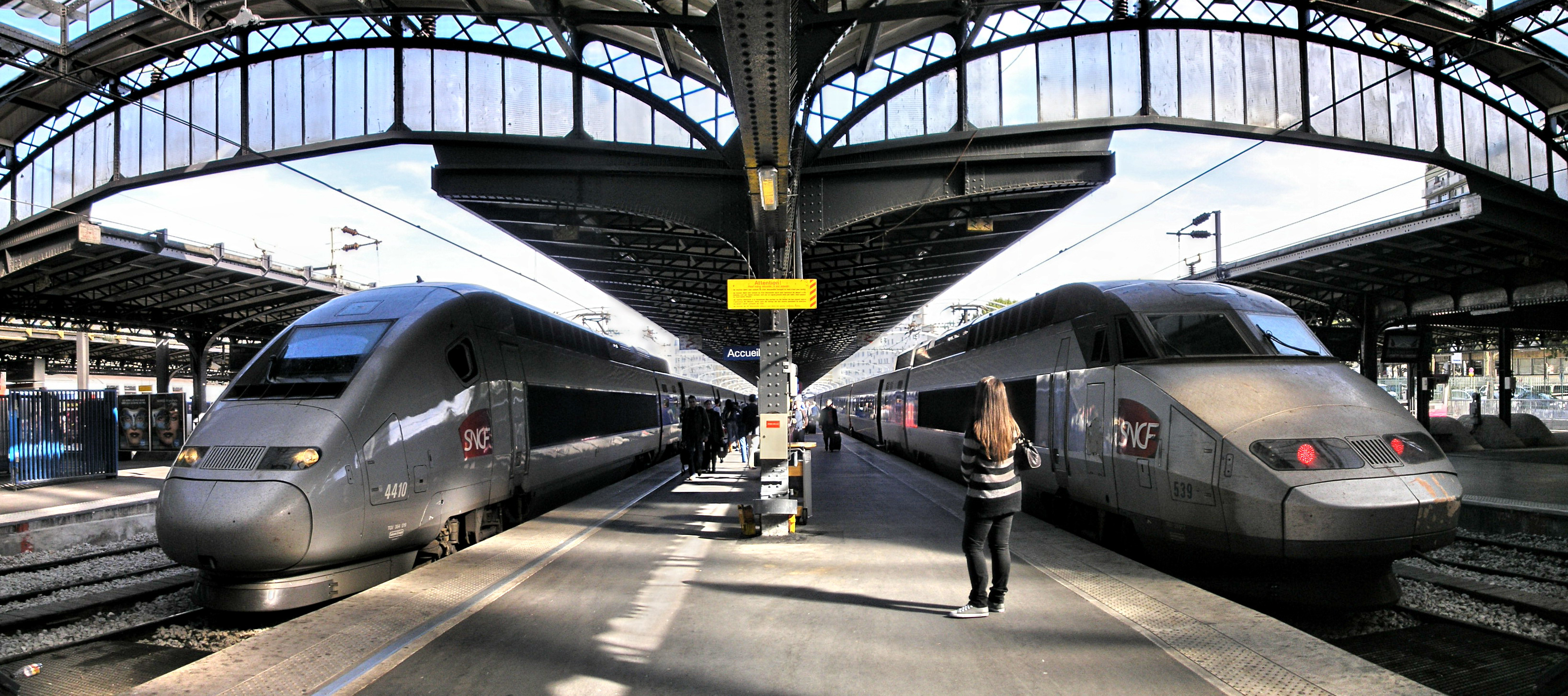
Two high-speed TGV trains by Alstom SA at Paris-Gare de l'Est

Transportation in France relies on one of the densest networks in the world with 146 km of road and 6.2 km of rail lines per 100 km^{2}. It is built as a web with Paris at its centre. The highly subsidised rail transport network makes up a relatively small portion of travel, most of which is done by car. However, the high-speed TGV trains make up a large proportion of long-distance travel, partially because intercity buses were prevented from operating until 2015.

With 3,220 kilometers of high-speed train lines, France boast the 2nd most expansive network in the world, only after China. Charles de Gaulle Airport is one of the busiest airports in the world by passenger traffic. Charles de Gaulle airport is third globally in the number of destinations served, and first in the number of countries served with non-stop flights.

France also boasts a number of seaports and harbours, including Bayonne, Bordeaux, Boulogne-sur-Mer, Brest, Calais, Cherbourg-Octeville, Dunkerque, Fos-sur-Mer, La Pallice, Le Havre, Lorient, Marseille, Nantes, Nice, Paris, Port-la-Nouvelle, Port-Vendres, Roscoff, Rouen, Saint-Nazaire, Saint-Malo, Sète, Strasbourg and Toulon. There are approximately 470 airports in France and by a 2005 estimate, there are three heliports. 288 of the airports have paved runways, with the remaining 199 being unpaved. The national carrier of France is Air France, a full service global airline which flies to 20 domestic destinations and 150 international destinations in 83 countries (including Overseas France) across all 6 major continents.

=== Water supply and sanitation ===
Water supply and sanitation in France is universal and of good quality. Salient features of the sector compared to other developed countries are the high degree of private sector participation using concession and lease contracts (gestion déléguée) and the existence of basin agencies that levy fees on utilities in order to finance environmental investments. Water losses in France (26%) are high compared to England (19%) and Germany (7%).

== Domestic and foreign investment ==
According to a study conducted by Ernst & Young, France was in 2020 the largest Foreign Direct Investment recipient in Europe, ahead of the UK and Germany. EY attributed this as a "direct result of President Macron’s reforms of labor laws and corporate taxation, which were well received by domestic and international investors alike."

France scored 5th in the 2019 AT Kearney FDI Confidence Index, up 2 notches from its 2017 ranking.

== Labour market ==
According to a 2011 report by the American Bureau of Labor Statistics (BLS), France's GDP per capita at purchasing power parity is similar to that of the UK, with just over US$35,000 per head. To explain why French per capita GDP is lower than that of the United States, the economist Paul Krugman stated that "French workers are roughly as productive as US workers", but that the French have a lower workforce participation rate, and "when they work, they work fewer hours". According to Krugman, the difference is due to the French making "different choices about retirement and leisure".

La Part-Dieu, Lyon's central business district

France has long suffered a relatively high unemployment rate, even during the years when its macroeconomic performances compared favourably with other advanced economies. The employment rate of the French working-age population is one of the lowest of the OECD countries: in 2020, only 64.4% of the French working-age population were in employment, compared to 77% in Japan, 76.1% in Germany, 75.4% in the UK, but the French employment rate was higher than that of the US, which stood at 62.5%. This gap is due to the low employment rate of those 15–24 years old: 38% in 2012, compared to 47% in the OECD.

Since his election in 2017, Emmanuel Macron has introduced several labour market reforms which proved successful in decreasing the unemployment rate before the global COVID-19 recession struck. In late 2019, the French unemployment rate, though still high compared to other developed economies, was the lowest in a decade.

During the 2000s and 2010s, classical liberal and Keynesian economists sought out different solutions to the unemployment issue in France. Keynesian economists's theories led to the introduction of the 35-hour workweek law in 1999. Between 2004 and 2008, the government attempted to combat unemployment with supply-side reforms, but was met with fierce resistance; the contrat nouvelle embauche and the contrat première embauche (which allowed more flexible contracts) were of particular concern, and both were eventually repealed. The Sarkozy government used the revenu de solidarité active (in-work benefits) to redress the negative effect of the revenu minimum d'insertion (unemployment benefits which do not depend on previous contributions, unlike normal unemployment benefits in France) on the incentive to accept even jobs which are insufficient to earn a living. Neoliberal economists attribute the low employment rate, particularly evident among young people, to high minimum wages that would prevent low productivity workers from easily entering the labour market.

A December 2012 New York Times article reported on a "floating generation" in France that formed part of the 14 million unemployed young Europeans documented by the Eurofound research agency. This floating generation was attributed to a dysfunctional system: "an elitist educational tradition that does not integrate graduates into the work force, a rigid labour market that is hard to enter for newcomers, and a tax system that makes it expensive for companies to hire full-time employees and both difficult and expensive to lay them off". In July 2013, the unemployment rate for France was 11%.

In early April 2014, employers' federations and unions negotiated an agreement with technology and consultancy employers, as employees had been experiencing an extension of their work time through smartphone communication outside of official working hours. Under a new, legally binding labour agreement, around 250,000 employees will avoid handling work-related matters during their leisure time and their employers will, in turn, refrain from engaging with staff during this time.

Every day, about 80,000 French citizens commute to work in neighbouring Luxembourg, making it the biggest cross-border workforce group in the whole of the European Union. They are often attracted by much higher wages for the different job groups than in their own country and the lack of skilled labour in the Luxembourgish economy.

The background of the 2023 pension reform was about 14% of GDP pension spending in France compared to OECD average of just over 9%. The aim of the pension reform was to reduce cost by increasing the minimum legal retirement age from 62 years to 64 years in 2030. In April 2023, president Emmanuel Macron signed the pension reforms into law.

== External trade ==
Exports of France by product category (2019) Chemical products Transportation Machines Mineral products Plastics and rubbers Metals Foodstuffs Precious metals Textiles Instruments Animal products Vegetable products Paper goods Footwear and headwear Miscellaneous Stone and glass Wood products Animal and vegetable bi-products Animal hides Arts and antiques Weapons

In 2018, France was the 5th largest trading nation in the world, as well as the second-largest trading nation in Europe (after Germany). Its foreign trade balance for goods had been in surplus from 1992 until 2001, reaching $25.4 billion (25.4 G$) in 1998; however, the French balance of trade was hit by the economic downturn, and went into the red in 2000, reaching a US$15bn deficit in 2003. Total trade for 1998 amounted to $730 billion, or 50% of GDP—imports plus exports of goods and services. Trade with European Union countries accounts for 60% of French trade.

In 1998, US–France trade stood at about $47 billion – goods only. According to French trade data, US exports accounted for 8.7% – about $25 billion – of France's total imports. US industrial chemicals, aircraft and engines, electronic components, telecommunications, computer software, computers and peripherals, analytical and scientific instrumentation, medical instruments and supplies, broadcasting equipment, and programming and franchising are particularly attractive to French importers.

The principal French exports to the US are aircraft and engines, beverages, electrical equipment, chemicals, cosmetics, luxury products and perfume. France is the ninth-largest trading partner of the US.

Amounts in billions of US dollars (2016)

Exports
Rank	Country	Amount
1.	Germany	70.1
2.	United States	40.4
3.	Belgium; Luxembourg	36.7
4.	Italy	35.3
5.	United Kingdom	35.3
6.	Spain	34.6
7.	China	18.6
8.	Netherlands	16.8
9.	Switzerland	16.2
10.	Japan	8.9
11.	Poland	7.9
12.	Singapore	7.8
13.	Turkey	7.5
14.	Hong Kong	6.4
15.	Ireland	6.3
16.	Russia	6.1
17.	Sweden	5.7
18.	South Korea	5.7
19.	Algeria	5.3
20.	Portugal	5.3

Imports
Rank	Country	Amount
1.	Germany	99.8
2.	China	47.9
3.	Italy	43.7
4.	Belgium; Luxembourg	41.6
5.	United States	37.9
6.	Spain	37.1
7.	Netherlands	26.4
8.	United Kingdom	22.4
9.	Switzerland	15.8
10.	Poland	10.4
11.	Japan	10.1
12.	Ireland	7.6
13.	Czech Republic	7.6
14.	Turkey	7.5
15.	Norway	6.4
16.	Portugal	6.3
17.	Sweden	6.0
18.	Austria	5.6
19.	India	5.1
20.	Vietnam	5.0

Total trade
Rank	Country	Amount
1.	Germany	169.9
2.	Italy	79.0
3.	United States	78.3
4.	Belgium; Luxembourg	78.3
5.	Spain	71.7
6.	China	66.5
7.	United Kingdom	57.7
8.	Netherlands	43.2
9.	Switzerland	32.0
10.	Japan	19.0

In August 2023, the French current account deficit shrank by €29.7 billion in the past six months, from −€39.3 billion to −€9.6 billion, primarily due to a fall in energy prices.

== Regional economy ==
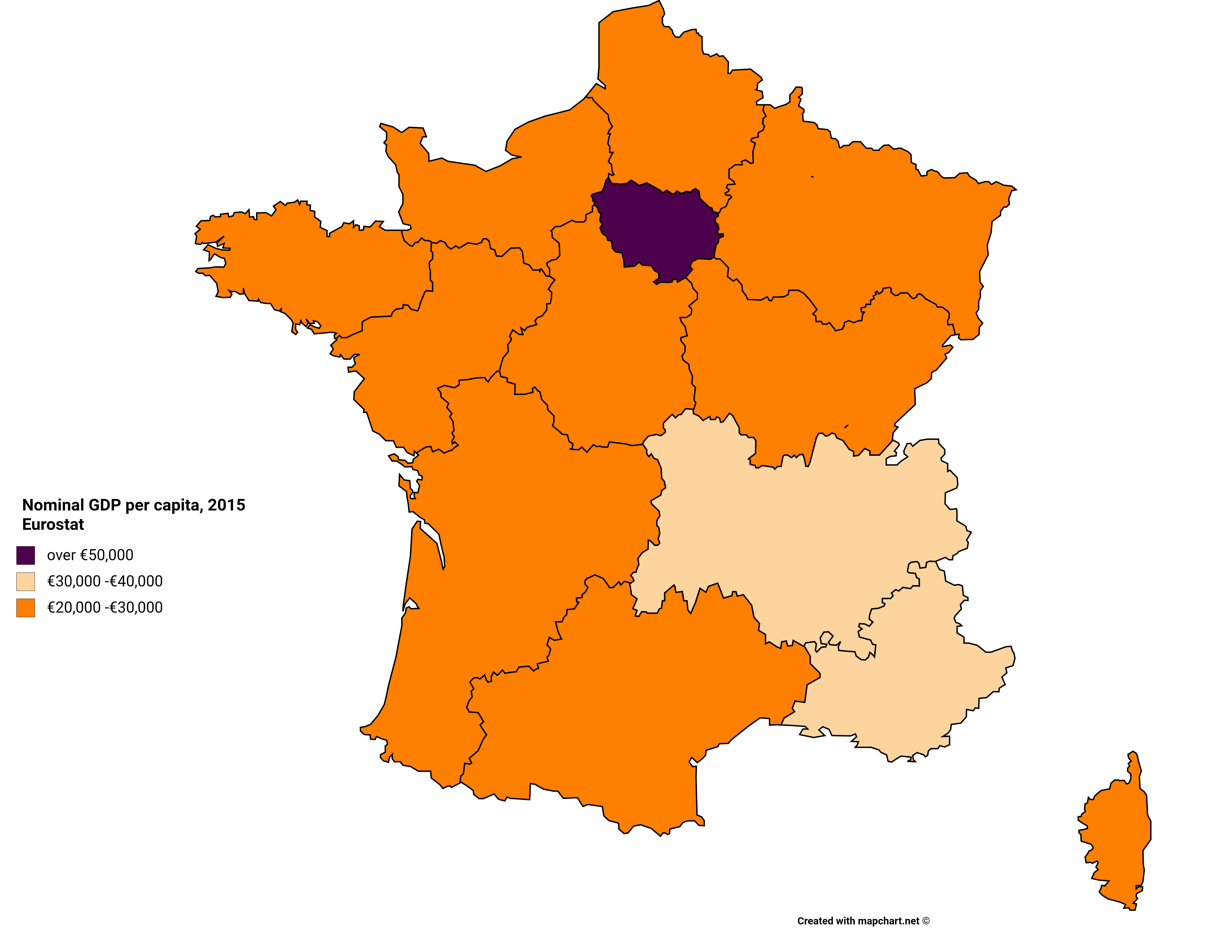
Nominal GDP per capita, 2015 Eurostat

The economic disparity between French regions is not as high as that in other European countries such as the UK or Italy and higher than in countries like Sweden or Denmark, or even Spain. However, Europe's wealthiest and second-largest regional economy, Ile-de-France (the region surrounding Paris), has long profited from the capital city's economic hegemony.

The most important régions are Île-de-France (Europe's 4th regional economy), Rhône-Alpes (Europe's 5th largest regional economy thanks to its services, high-technologies, chemical industries, wines, tourism), Provence-Alpes-Côte d'Azur (services, industry, tourism and wines), Nord-Pas-de-Calais (European transport hub, services, industries) and Pays de la Loire (green technologies, tourism). Regions like Alsace, which has a rich past in industry (machine tool) and currently stands as a high income service-specialised region, are very wealthy without ranking very high in absolute terms.

The rural areas are mainly in Auvergne, Limousin, and Centre-Val de Loire, and wine production accounts for a significant proportion of the economy in Aquitaine (Bordeaux (or claret)), Burgundy, and champagne produced in Champagne-Ardennes.

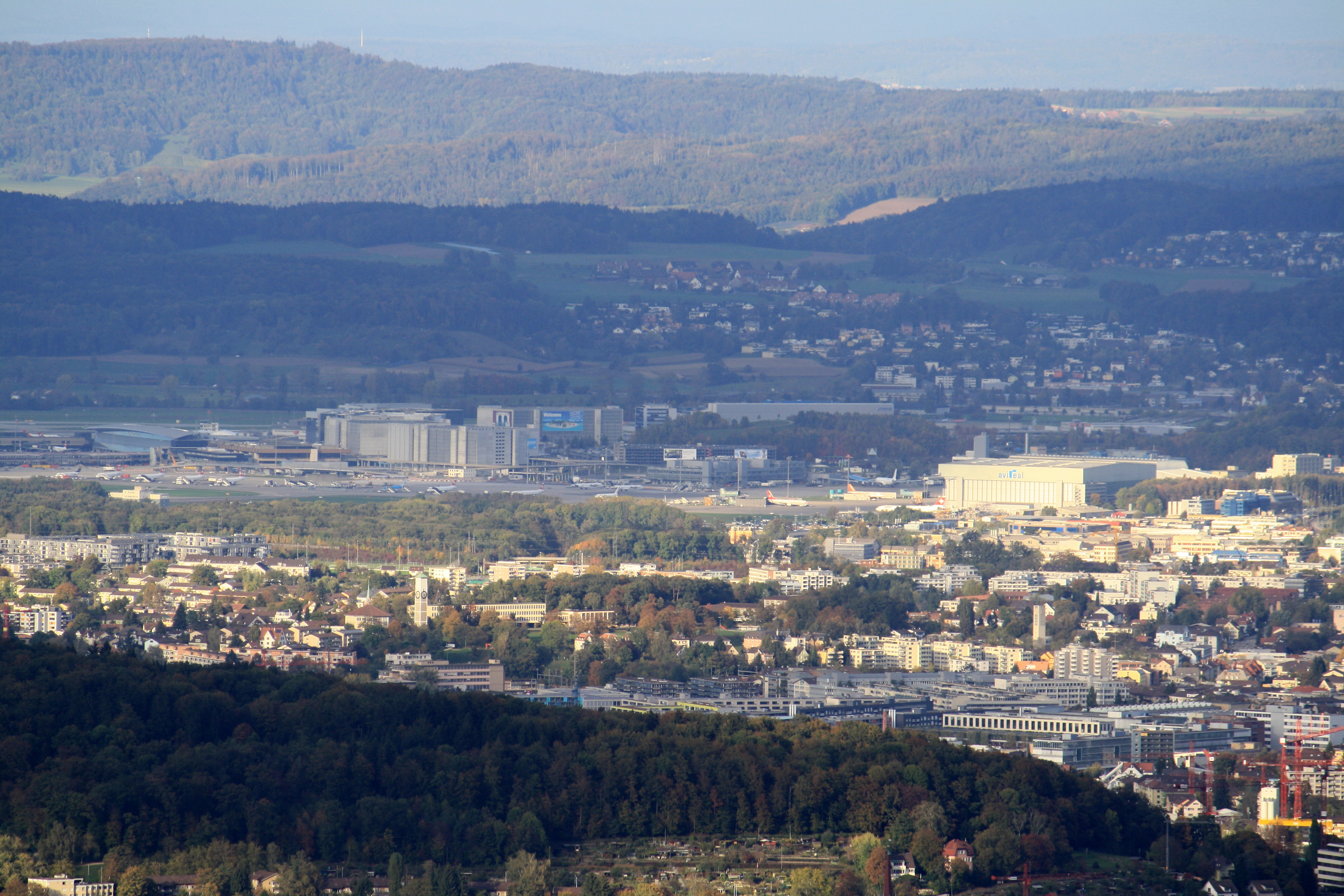
Rhône-Alpes, Europe's 5th largest regional economy. In the past mining, especially coal mining was an important sector, particularly around Saint-Étienne, although this has declined since the 1970s.

Rank	Region	GDP (millions of euros, 2023)	GDP per capita (euros, 2023)
1	Île de France	860,067	69,287
2	Auvergne-Rhône-Alpes	328,611	40,017
3	Nouvelle-Aquitaine	213,662	34,814
4	Occitanie	213,320	34,844
5	Hauts-de-France	196,683	32,789
6	Provence-Alpes-Côte d'Azur	196,217	37,849
7	Grand Est	189,105	33,912
8	Pays de la Loire	143,617	36,732
9	Brittany	119,169	34,645
10	Normandy	115,942	34,784
11	Bourgogne-Franche-Comté	91,409	32,652
12	Centre-Val de Loire	89,893	34,872
	Réunion	23,165	26,249
	Guadeloupe	11,225	27,325
13	Corsica	10,710	30,288
	Martinique	10,138	28,630
	French Guiana	5,195	17,700
	Mayotte	3,326	11,485

== Departments economy and cities ==
=== Departmental income inequalities ===
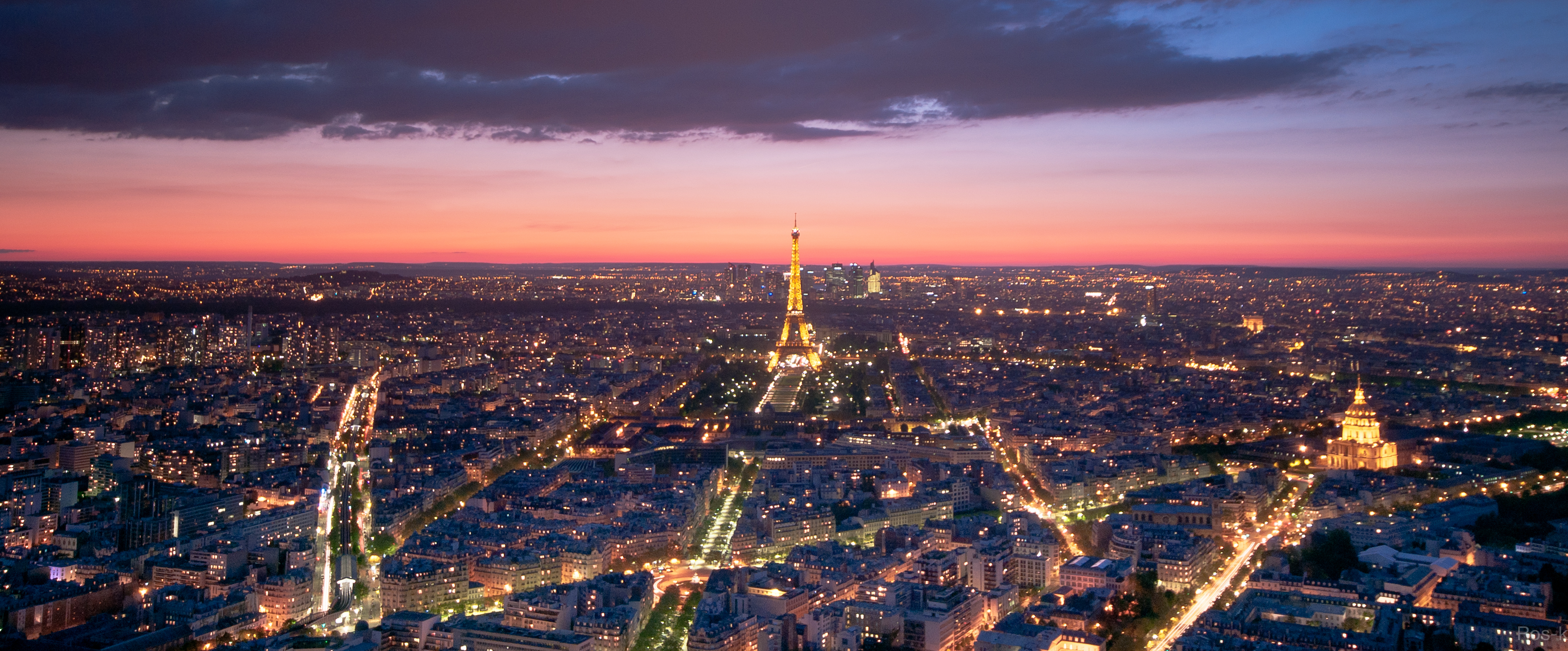
Paris is France's largest urban economy (and the world's third).

In terms of income, important inequalities can be observed among the French départements.

According to the 2008 statistics of the INSEE, the Yvelines is the highest income department of the country with an average income of €4,750 per month. Hauts-de-Seine comes second, Essonne third, Paris fourth, Seine-et Marne fifth. Île-de-France is the wealthiest region in the country with an average income of €4,228 per month (and is also the wealthiest region in Europe) compared to €3,081 at the national level. Alsace comes second, Rhône-Alpes third, Picardy fourth, and Upper Normandy fifth.

The poorest parts of France are the French overseas departments, French Guiana being the poorest department with an average household income of €1,826. In Metropolitan France it is Creuse in the Limousin region which comes bottom of the list with an average household income of €1,849 per month.

=== Urban income inequalities ===
Huge inequalities can also be found among cities. In the Paris metropolitan area, significant differences exist between the higher standard of living of Paris Ouest and lower standard of living in areas in the northern banlieues of Paris such as Seine-Saint-Denis.

For cities of over 50,000 inhabitants, Neuilly-sur-Seine, a western suburb of Paris, is the wealthiest city in France with an average household income of €5,939, and 35% earning more than €8,000 per month. But within Paris, four arrondissements surpass wealthy Neuilly-sur-Seine in household income: the 6th, the 7th, the 8th and the 16th; the 8th arrondissement being the wealthiest district in France (the other three following it closely as 2nd, 3rd and 4th wealthiest ones).

== Poverty ==
OECD data from 2021 estimate that 8.4% of the French population lived in poverty, compared with 18% in the United States, 11.6% in Canada, and 9.8% in Germany. In 2016, the poverty rate in France stood at 14%, compared to 12.8% in 2004. The northern districts of Marseille represent one of the poorest and unequal areas in France, where poor neighbourhoods rub shoulders with wealthier pockets. The share of people living below the poverty line (949 euro per month) was 28.8% in 2008 in sensitive urban zones (ZUS) compared to 12% in the rest of the territory.

In comparison with the average French workers, foreign workers tended to be employed in the hardest and lowest-paid jobs. They also live in poor conditions. A 1972 study found that foreign workers earned 17% less than their French counterparts, although this national average concealed the extent of inequality. Foreign workers were more likely to be men in their prime working years in the industrial areas, which generally had higher rates of pay than elsewhere.

== Wealth ==
=== Overview ===
In 2010, the French had an estimated wealth of US$14.0 trillion for a population of 63 million.

- In terms of aggregate wealth, the French are the wealthiest Europeans, accounting for more than a quarter of wealthiest European households. Globally, the French nation ranks fourth-wealthiest.
- In 2010, wealth per French adult was a little higher than $290,000, down from a pre-crisis high of $300,000 in 2007. According to this ratio, the French are the wealthiest in Europe. The wealth tax is paid by 1.1 million people in France. Liability to this tax starts from €1.3 million of assets. (There is a discount on the principal residence value.)
- Almost every French household has at least $1,000 in assets. Proportionally, there are twice as many French with assets of over $10,000 and four times as many French with assets of over $100,000 than the world average.

=== Millionaires ===
France has the third-highest number of millionaires in Europe as of 2017. There were 1.617 million millionaire households (measured in US dollars) living in France in 2017, behind the UK (2.225 million) and Germany (1.637 million).

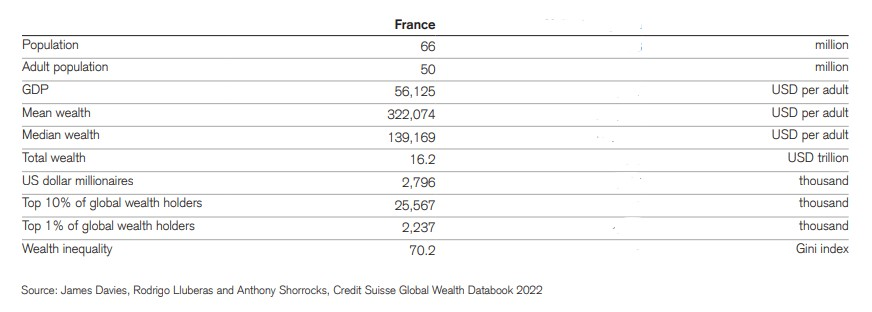
France Macroeconomic indicators

The wealthiest man in France is the LVMH CEO and owner Bernard Arnault.

By 2022, the combined wealth of France's 500 richest people will be worth 1,170 billion euros, or 45% of GDP. In 2009, this figure was just 194 billion, representing 10% of GDP at the time.

== See also ==
- Economy of Paris
- Economy of Rhône-Alpes
- Economy of Toulouse
- List of companies of France
- List of French departments by GDP
- List of French regions and overseas collectivities by GDP
- List of French regions and overseas departments by GRP per capita
- Agence des participations de l'État
- Bank of France
- Bpifrance (public entity)
- Corruption in France
- Economic Affairs Committee (French National Assembly)
- Economic impacts of climate change in France
- Economic planning in France
- Economy of French Guiana, French Polynesia, Guadeloupe, Martinique, Mayotte, New Caledonia, Réunion, Saint Barthélemy, Saint Martin, Saint Pierre and Miquelon or Wallis and Futuna
- France and the World Bank
- French company law
- French labour law
- French special retirement plan
- Made in France
- Ministry of Economics and Finance (France)
- Minister of Labour, Employment and Economic Inclusion (France)
- National Institute of Statistics and Economic Studies
- Pensions Reserve Fund (France)
- Trade unions in France
- Economy of the European Union
- Economy of Europe
