= List of French regions and overseas departments by GRP per capita =

This article is about the gross regional product (GRP) per capita of French regions and overseas departments in nominal values. Values are shown in EUR€. For easy comparison, all the GRP figures are converted into US$ according to annual average exchange rates. (Note: Euro figures are converted to USD rates as of 31 December of a given year.) All values are rounded to the nearest hundred.

== 2024 ==
List of French regions and DOMs by nominal GRP per capita
Region or DOM	Rank	GRP per capita (EUR€)	GRP per capita (US$)
France	—	42,600	46,100
Île-de-France	1	69,500	75,200
Auvergne-Rhône-Alpes	2	41,900	45,400
Provence-Alpes-Côte d'Azur	3	41,800	45,300
Pays de la Loire	4	37,500	40,600
Corsica	5	37,500	40,600
Brittany	6	36,600	39,600
Nouvelle-Aquitaine	7	36,200	39,200
Occitania	8	35,900	38,900
Centre-Val de Loire	9	35,600	38,400
Grand Est	10	35,400	38,300
Normandy	11	35,300	38,200
Bourgogne-Franche-Comté	12	34,200	37,000
Hauts-de-France	13	32,900	35,600
Martinique	14	29,900	32,300
Guadeloupe	15	29,100	31,500
Réunion	16	27,500	29,800
French Guiana	17	17,700	19,200
Mayotte	—	ND	ND

== See also ==
- List of French regions and overseas collectivities by GDP
