= List of French regions and overseas collectivities by GDP =

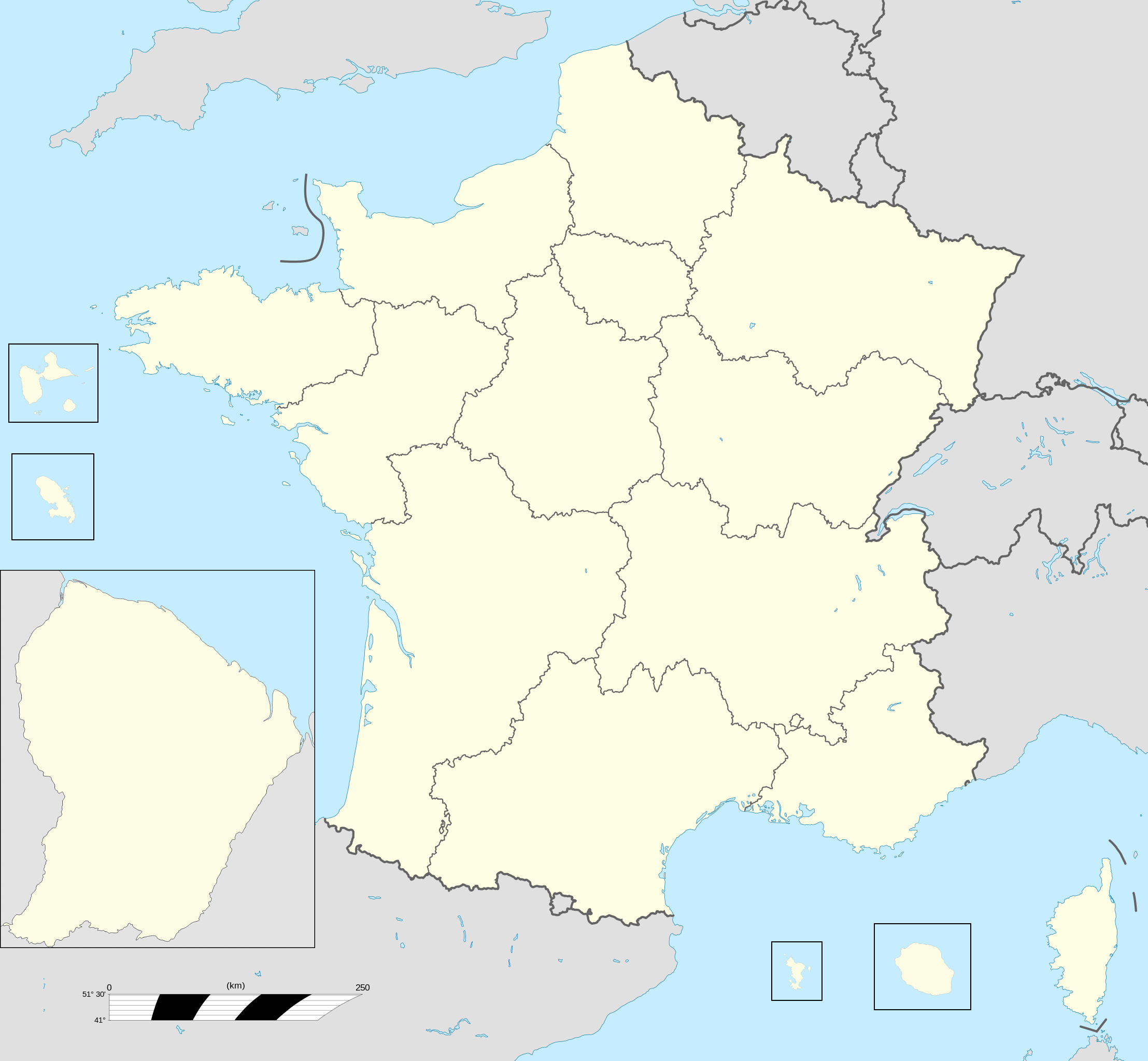

This article lists French regions and overseas collectivities by gross domestic product (GDP).

Introduction INSEE and affiliate statistical offices in the overseas collectivities produce estimates of GDP in France's 18 regions and 5 overseas collectivities every year, and in some overseas collectivities where GDP estimates are made only every few years.

In 2011, France (whose territory in the national accounts refers to Metropolitan France plus the four old overseas regions of Guadeloupe, Martinique, French Guiana, and Réunion, but excludes Mayotte and the six overseas collectivities) had a GDP of US$2,778 bn, 98.2% of which was produced in Metropolitan France, and 1.8% in the four overseas regions.

== Dynamics ==
Île-de-France (the Paris Region) has a much higher GDP per capita than the rest of France, due to its position as one of the "command centres" for the global economy, as well as its relatively low share of retirees. Outside Île-de-France, the 12 other regions of Metropolitan France show remarkably little disparity in their GDPs per capita.

The "poorest" region of Metropolitan France outside Île-de-France in 2016, Hauts-de-France, had a GDP per capita which was four fifths the level of the richest region Auvergne-Rhône-Alpes. This is in contrast to most neighbours of France where regional disparities are much more marked (East Germany vs West Germany, southern Spain and Italy vs northern Spain and Italy, Wallonia vs Flanders).

Overseas, only Saint Barthélemy, Saint Pierre and Miquelon, and New Caledonia have GDP per capita at the level of Metropolitan French regions. All other overseas regions and collectivities have GDP per capita noticeably lower than the Metropolitan French regions. The lowest is found in Mayotte, where GDP per capita was slightly less than a quarter of Metropolitan France's level in 2009, although it has been increasing a lot in recent years with the accession of Mayotte to overseas department and region status (and soon outermost region of the European Union, thus eligible for EU structural funds from 2014 on).

Nominal GDP 2025
Rank	Region	GDP(millions of euros, 2025)	GDP per capita(euros, 2025)
1	Île de France	900,099	72,452
2	Auvergne-Rhône-Alpes	359,431	43,543
3	Nouvelle-Aquitaine	234,140	37,870
4	Occitanie	230,108	37,131
5	Provence-Alpes-Côte d'Azur	228,679	43,836
6	Hauts-de-France	205,822	34,405
7	Grand Est	204,134	36,643
8	Pays de la Loire	153,574	38,988
9	Brittany	131,096	37,811
10	Normandy	115,942	34,784
11	Bourgogne-Franche-Comté	97,771	35,083
12	Centre-Val de Loire	93,867	36,506
	Réunion	25,470	28,617
13	Corsica	14,036	39,101
	Guadeloupe	11,617	30,303
	Martinique	10,732	30,186
	French Guiana	6,188	20,609
	Mayotte	3,614	11,807

== Gross domestic product ==
Nominal GDP in euros and CFP francs has been converted to US dollars at the €/US$ purchasing power parity rate of each given year.

List of French regions and overseas collectivities by GDP (PPP)
2022 Rank	Regions & collectivities	2022 GDP (mil. of US$ PPP)	2018 GDP (mil. of US$ PPP)	2015 GDP (mil. of US$ PPP)	2014 GDP (mil. of US$ PPP)	2013 GDP (mil. of US$ PPP)
	France (Note: Metropolitan France + the four old overseas departments of Guadeloupe, Martinique, French Guiana, and Réunion. INSEE, Eurostat, the World Bank, and the IMF include neither the new overseas department of Mayotte, nor the overseas collectivities and New Caledonia when they publish economic figures of France.)	3,914,754	2,765,540	2,696,180	2,659,360	2,606,140
1	Île-de-France	1,160,945	964,751	820,365	807,038	792,104
2	Auvergne-Rhône-Alpes	451,955	373,259	308,867	304,050	295,610
3	Provence-Alpes-Côte d'Azur	306,678	219,513	188,175	186,312	184,584
4	Nouvelle-Aquitaine	296,044	232,973	204,496	202,360	194,094
5	Occitanie	286,386	228,195	194,005	191,087	186,741
6	Hauts-de-France	275,124	219,837	190,217	187,984	187,223
7	Grand Est	265,412	213,004	187,878	187,326	183,381
8	Pays de la Loire	203,298	155,384	133,128	130,615	129,155
9	Brittany	170,861	130,363	113,287	110,973	107,805
10	Normandy	159,006	125,281	112,195	111,013	110,562
11	Bourgogne-Franche-Comté	129,868	103,385	91,956	91,559	88,403
12	Centre-Val de Loire	118,658	98,049	86,026	85,253	84,609
13	Réunion	32,142	24,892	22,865	22,319	21,523
14	Guadeloupe	15,559	12,652	11,291	10,987	10,734
15	Corsica	15,284	12,425	10,788	10,557	10,423
16	Martinique	14,320	11,765	11,200	10,991	10,673
17	French Guiana	6,767	5,757	5,203	5,047	4,838
18	Mayotte	4,965	3,241	3,216	2,630	2,383
—	France - not regionalised	1,482	1,319	1,304	1,261	1,297
—	New Caledonia	—	—	—	—	10,251
—	French Polynesia	—	—	—	—	7,943
—	Saint Pierre and Miquelon	—	—	—	—	253
—	Saint Martin	Last data is from 1999. GDP that year was US$449 million.				
—	Saint Barthélemy	Last data is from 1999. GDP that year was US$191 million.				
—	Wallis and Futuna	Last data is from 2005. GDP that year was US$188 million.				

== Per capita GDP ==
Figures are in US dollars at purchasing power parity (PPP).

List of French regions and overseas collectivities by nominal GDP per capita
2022 Rank	Regions & collectivities	2022 GDP per capita (in US$ PPP)	2018 GDP per capita (in US$ PPP)	2015 GDP per capita (in US$ PPP)	2014 GDP per capita (in US$ PPP)	2013 GDP per capita (in US$ PPP)
	France (Note: Metropolitan France + the four old overseas departments of Guadeloupe, Martinique, French Guiana, and Réunion. INSEE, Eurostat, the World Bank, and the IMF include neither the new overseas department of Mayotte, nor the overseas collectivities and New Caledonia when they publish economic figures of France.)	57,551	41,363	40,487	40,172	39,624
1	Île-de-France	93,936	78,863	67,740	66,947	66,043
2	Provence-Alpes-Côte d'Azur	59,470	43,388	37,499	37,294	37,150
3	Auvergne-Rhône-Alpes	55,278	46,585	39,070	38,736	37,951
4	Pays de la Loire	52,228	40,989	35,686	35,257	35,136
5	Brittany	49,922	39,017	34,313	33,780	32,992
6	Nouvelle-Aquitaine	48,485	38,897	34,508	34,326	33,112
7	Normandy	47,848	37,688	33,588	33,263	33,182
8	Grand Est	47,707	38,401	33,803	33,711	33,021
9	Occitanie	47,063	38,662	33,468	33,218	32,720
10	Bourgogne-Franche-Comté	46,506	36,861	32,605	32,459	31,347
11	Centre-Val de Loire	46,122	38,134	33,349	33,069	32,871
12	Hauts-de-France	45,961	36,639	31,632	31,289	31,219
13	Corsica	43,564	36,500	32,790	32,410	32,349
14	Martinique	40,587	32,092	29,516	28,840	27,855
15	Guadeloupe	38,050	30,164	26,098	25,192	24,462
16	Réunion	36,718	29,070	26,794	26,324	25,552
17	French Guiana	22,980	20,624	19,756	19,784	19,531
18	Mayotte	16,306	12,258	12,475	—	—
—	Saint Pierre and Miquelon	—	—	—	—	42,356
—	New Caledonia	—	—	—	—	39,367
—	French Polynesia	—	—	—	—	27,352
—	Saint Barthélemy	Last data is from 1999. GDP per capita that year was US$27,737, i.e. 113.5% of Metropolitan France's GDP per capita.				
—	Saint Martin	Last data is from 1999. GDP per capita that year was US$15,469, i.e. 63.3% of Metropolitan France's GDP per capita.				
—	Wallis and Futuna	Last data is from 2005. GDP per capita that year was US$13,102, i.e. 37.9% of Metropolitan France's GDP per capita.				

== See also ==
- Economy of France
- Ranked list of French regions
- List of French departments by GDP
