= Ranked list of French regions =

French regions ranked by population and area

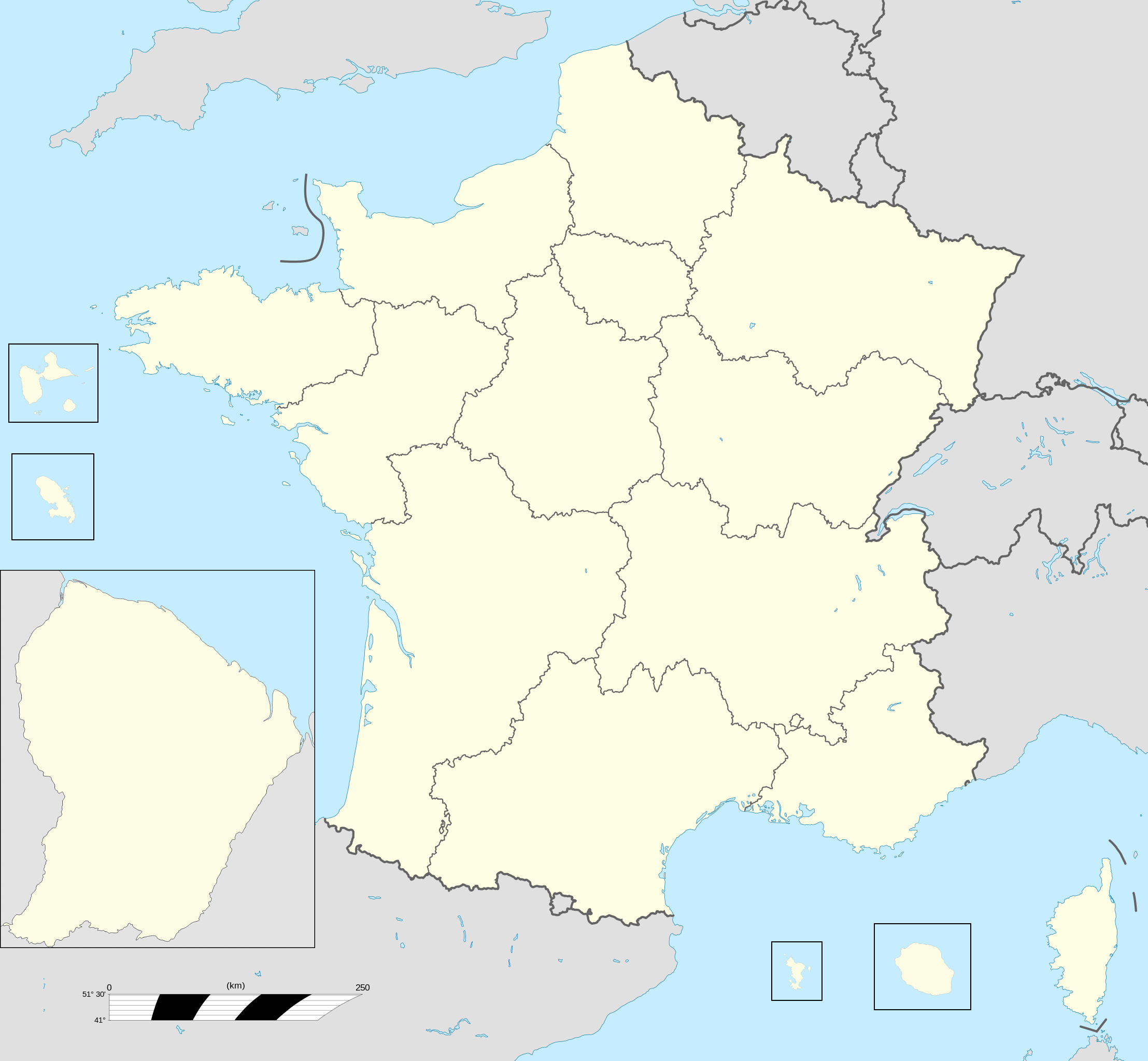

The following are ranked lists of French regions.

== By population ==
These figures are as of January 1, 2026.

Rank	Region	Population (2026)	% of France
1	Île-de-France	12,594,502	18.2 %
2	Auvergne-Rhône-Alpes	8,303,191	12.0 %
3	Occitanie	6,246,988	9.0 %
4	Nouvelle-Aquitaine	6,241,784	9.0 %
5	Hauts-de-France	5,965,764	8.6 %
6	Grand Est	5,544,271	8.0 %
7	Provence-Alpes-Côte d'Azur	5,318,370	7.7 %
8	Pays de la Loire	3,965,226	5.7 %
9	Brittany	3,510,058	5.1 %
10	Normandy	3,353,726	4.9 %
11	Bourgogne-Franche-Comté	2,794,043	4.0 %
12	Centre-Val de Loire	2,589,286	3.7 %
13	Réunion	910,985	1.3 %
14	Guadeloupe	382,586	0.6 %
15	Corsica	365,636	0.5 %
16	Martinique	358,818	0.5 %
17	Mayotte	338,208	0.5 %
18	French Guiana	298,554	0.4 %
	Total France	69,081,996	100 %

== By area ==
The total area of France is 632,734 km^{2}, of which 543,940 km^{2} (86.0%) is in Europe (Metropolitan France).

Rank	Region	Area (km^{2})	% (total)	% (European France)
1	Nouvelle-Aquitaine	84,061	13.3%	15.4%
2	French Guiana	83,534	13.2%	–
3	Occitanie	72,724	11.5%	13.3%
4	Auvergne-Rhône-Alpes	69,711	11.0%	12.8%
5	Grand Est	57,433	9.0%	10.5%
6	Bourgogne-Franche-Comté	47,784	7.6%	8.8%
7	Centre-Val de Loire	39,151	6.2%	7.2%
8	Pays de la Loire	32,082	5.1%	5.9%
9	Hauts-de-France	31,713	5.1%	5.9%
10	Provence-Alpes-Côte d'Azur	31,400	5.0%	5.8%
11	Normandy	29,906	4.7%	5.5%
12	Brittany	27,208	4.3%	5.0%
13	Île-de-France	12,012	1.9%	2.2%
14	Corsica	8,680	1.4%	1.6%
15	Réunion	2,504	0.4%	–
16	Guadeloupe	1,628	0.3%	–
17	Martinique	1,128	0.2%	–
18	Mayotte	374	0.06%	–
	Total	632,760	100%	

== By density ==
In 2026, the official population of France had a density of 109 people per square kilometre, including the overseas regions, and 123 people per square kilometre excluding them.

Rank	Region	Population 2026	Area (km^{2})	Density
1	Île-de-France	12,594,502	12,012	1,048
2	Mayotte	338,208	374	904
3	Réunion	910,985	2,504	364
4	Martinique	358,818	1,128	318
5	Guadeloupe	382,586	1,628	235
6	Hauts-de-France	5,965,764	31,713	188
7	Provence-Alpes-Côte d'Azur	5,318,370	31,400	169
8	Brittany	3,510,058	27,208	129
9	Pays de la Loire	3,965,226	32,082	124
10	Auvergne-Rhône-Alpes	8,303,191	69,711	119
11	Normandy	3,353,726	29,906	112
12	Grand Est	5,544,271	57,433	97
13	Occitanie	6,246,988	72,724	86
14	Nouvelle-Aquitaine	6,241,784	84,061	74
15	Centre-Val de Loire	2,589,286	39,151	66
16	Bourgogne-Franche-Comté	2,794,043	47,784	58
17	Corsica	365,636	8,680	42
18	French Guiana	298,554	83,534	4
	Total	69,081,996	632,760	109

== See also ==
- List of French regions and overseas collectivities by GDP
