= France and the World Bank =

France has been a member of the International Bank for Reconstruction and Development (IBRD) since December 27, 1945. A key milestone occurred when France received the first IBRD loan on May 9, 1947, receiving $250 million to rebuild its infrastructure ravaged by the Second World War. Currently, France is a member of all five World Bank Group institutions.

== History ==
=== Monnet Plan ===
As a result of World War II, the economy of France was shattered. The conflict had claimed the lives of over half a million French citizens, leaving entire cities in ruins and critical infrastructure devastated. In addition to labor shortages, the country was unable to produce coal due to the lack of modern machinery forcing the country to import it.

Charles de Gaulle, Chairman of the Provisional Government of the French Republic, set up the General Planning Commission on January 3 and appointed Jean Monnet as its first commissioner, in response to the dire situation. Monnet remained undeterred by the war's devastation and developed a compelling vision to revitalize France's economy. A key component of Monnet's Modernization and Re-equipment Plan was the rebuilding and modernization of key infrastructure sectors, including coal, electricity, cement, agricultural machinery, transport, and steel. The ambitious goal was to increase productivity by 30% above the pre-war levels of 1938 within just four years.

The French Ambassador to the United States, Henri Bonnet, requested a $500 million loan from Acting IBRD President Emilio Collado on May 31, 1946. Along with this request, France submitted a detailed outline of the Plan Monnet. The loan's primary purpose was to provide funds for the import and purchase of equipment and materials that are essential for the extensive reconstruction and modernization of the country.

== Contributions and partnership ==
Since France is now considered a high-income country, it is not eligible for funding but instead plays a large role in financial contributions. France provides money to the World Bank as a member nation. These donations are necessary for the institution to function and be able to help and financially assist developing nations. Their monetary payments, infrastructure, energy, agriculture, health care, and education are just a few of the industries in which France is renowned for its prowess. The nation frequently works with the World Bank on a range of initiatives and projects, offering technical support, exchanging knowledge, and helping to plan and implement development programs.

One example of France's partnership efforts is involvement in strengthening West African coastal areas' to the impacts of climate change. The World Bank and the French Ministry of Environment, Energy, and the Sea unveiled a joint initiative to aid West African nations in increasing the climate change resilience of their coastal regions and in identifying investment opportunities for the sustainable growth of their "blue" economies. The partnership is a response to calls from West African nations for assistance from other nations in resolving a variety of difficulties, including coastal erosion and floods, overexploitation of natural resources, marine and coastal pollution, increasing urbanization, and unsustainable land use. In order to gather money for climate resilience in coastal zones, it relies on promises and awareness-raising initiatives put out by the World Bank and France during the Paris climate change summit.
