= List of French departments by GDP =

This article lists the departments of France by gross domestic product (GDP) and by GDP per capita.

== Departments by GDP per capita in EUR ==
The following is a list of French departments by GDP per capita in EUR in 2022.

Rank (2022)	Department	GDP per capita (2022) (in euros)
1	Paris	124,650
2	Hauts-de-Seine	117,902
3	Rhône	54,870
4	Essonne	45,934
5	Bouches-du-Rhône	45,726
6	Haute-Garonne	43,032
7	Yvelines	42,714
8	Val-de-Marne	41,228
9	Seine-Saint-Denis	41,056
10	Loire-Atlantique	40,688
11	Côte-d'Or	39,811
12	Gironde	39,568
13	Ille-et-Vilaine	39,288
14	Marne	38,836
15	Alpes-Maritimes	38,488
16	Bas-Rhin	37,788
17	Isère	36,803
18	Savoie	36,426
19	Puy-de-Dôme	36,270
20	Seine-Maritime	36,239
21	Seine-Maritime	36,239
22	Drôme	35,875
23	Mayenne	35,799
24	Loiret	34,980
25	Nord	34,975
26	Charente	34,762
27	Vaucluse	34,410
28	Deux-Sèvres	34,311
29	Corse-du-Sud	34,032
30	Indre-et-Loire	33,902
31	Pyrénées-Atlantiques	33,784
32	Hérault	33,280
33	Vendée	32,777
34	Maine-et-Loire	32,225
35	Haute-Savoie	31,828
36	Finistère	31,762
37	Morbihan	31,752
38	Val-d'Oise	31,692
39	Calvados	31,640
40	Doubs	31,459
41	Doubs	31,459
42	Aube	31,098
43	Vienne	30,875
44	Loire	30,822
45	Seine-et-Marne	30,811
46	Haute-Vienne	30,790
47	Meurthe-et-Moselle	30,265
48	Saône-et-Loire	30,265
49	Jura	30,258
50	Manche	30,134
51	Oise	29,663
52	Charente-Maritime	29,349
53	Côtes-d'Armor	29,254
54	Sarthe	29,142
55	Loir-et-Cher	29,019
56	Var	28,999
57	Territoire de Belfort	28,963
58	Eure-et-Loir	28,853
59	Haute-Marne	28,822
60	Aveyron	28,716
61	Hautes-Alpes	28,672
62	Yonne	28,562
63	Cher	28,506
64	Ain	28,296
65	Alpes-de-Haute-Provence	28,149
66	Corrèze	28,086
67	Landes	27,964
68	Lozère	27,945
69	Lot-et-Garonne	27,893
70	Vosges	27,814
71	Moselle	27,752
72	Allier	27,657
73	Gard	27,561
74	Eure	27,364
75	Lot	27,356
76	Ardennes	26,816
77	Nièvre	26,791
78	Hautes-Pyrénées	26,682
79	Cantal	26,663
80	Tarn	26,485
81	Indre	26,381
82	Haute-Corse	26,362
83	Pyrénées-Orientales	26,232
84	Pas-de-Calais	26,111
85	Tarn-et-Garonne	26,095
86	Haute-Loire	26,029
87	Orne	25,934
88	Aisne	25,556
89	Dordogne	25,458
90	Meuse	25,142
91	Aude	25,054
92	Gers	24,905
93	Ardèche	24,720
94	Haute-Saône	24,383
95	Ariège	23,534
96	Creuse	22,488

== Departments by GDP in US$ PPP ==
All 95 Departments of Metropolitan France by GDP and GDP per capita in 2021. Nominal GDP in euros has been converted to US dollars at the €/US$ purchasing power parity rate.

Department	Region	2021 GDP (mil. of US$ PPP)	2021 GDP per capita (in US$ PPP)
Paris	Île-de-France	367,785	172,449
Seine-et-Marne	Île-de-France	61,803	42,912
Yvelines	Île-de-France	87,317	59,905
Essonne	Île-de-France	83,796	63,897
Hauts-de-Seine	Île-de-France	269,408	164,612
Seine-Saint-Denis	Île-de-France	96,970	58,035
Val-de-Marne	Île-de-France	81,481	57,270
Val-d'Oise	Île-de-France	56,067	44,259
Cher	Centre-Val de Loire	12,133	40,652
Eure-et-Loir	Centre-Val de Loire	17,579	40,946
Indre	Centre-Val de Loire	8,116	37,518
Indre-et-Loire	Centre-Val de Loire	28,556	46,496
Loir-et-Cher	Centre-Val de Loire	13,384	40,919
Loiret	Centre-Val de Loire	33,624	49,097
Côte-d'Or	Bourgogne-Franche-Comté	28,647	53,548
Nièvre	Bourgogne-Franche-Comté	7,517	37,540
Saône-et-Loire	Bourgogne-Franche-Comté	22,586	41,198
Yonne	Bourgogne-Franche-Comté	13,112	39,550
Doubs	Bourgogne-Franche-Comté	23,284	42,540
Jura	Bourgogne-Franche-Comté	10,316	40,044
Haute-Saône	Bourgogne-Franche-Comté	7,667	32,896
Territoire de Belfort	Bourgogne-Franche-Comté	5,555	40,133
Eure	Normandy	22,176	37,173
Seine-Maritime	Normandy	62,796	50,067
Calvados	Normandy	31,041	44,503
Manche	Normandy	20,733	42,041
Orne	Normandy	10,305	37,456
Aisne	Hauts-de-France	18,661	35,491
Oise	Hauts-de-France	33,225	39,941
Somme	Hauts-de-France	23,999	42,363
Nord	Hauts-de-France	125,315	48,059
Pas-de-Calais	Hauts-de-France	52,981	36,330
Ardennes	Grand Est	9,618	36,033
Aube	Grand Est	12,675	40,691
Marne	Grand Est	29,721	52,650
Haute-Marne	Grand Est	6,698	39,720
Meurthe-et-Moselle	Grand Est	30,386	41,554
Meuse	Grand Est	6,360	35,363
Moselle	Grand Est	40,447	38,599
Vosges	Grand Est	13,730	38,241
Bas-Rhin	Grand Est	60,393	52,228
Haut-Rhin	Grand Est	33,454	43,553
Loire-Atlantique	Pays de la Loire	79,949	54,360
Maine-et-Loire	Pays de la Loire	36,384	44,147
Mayenne	Pays de la Loire	14,301	46,739
Sarthe	Pays de la Loire	22,738	40,161
Vendée	Pays de la Loire	31,027	44,362
Côtes-d'Armor	Brittany	24,304	40,245
Finistère	Brittany	39,706	43,080
Ille-et-Vilaine	Brittany	58,174	52,708
Morbihan	Brittany	32,648	42,399
Charente	Nouvelle-Aquitaine	16,637	47,387
Charente-Maritime	Nouvelle-Aquitaine	26,649	40,384
Deux-Sèvres	Nouvelle-Aquitaine	17,701	47,272
Vienne	Nouvelle-Aquitaine	18,734	42,554
Dordogne	Nouvelle-Aquitaine	14,791	35,893
Gironde	Nouvelle-Aquitaine	89,345	53,569
Landes	Nouvelle-Aquitaine	16,558	39,203
Lot-et-Garonne	Nouvelle-Aquitaine	13,142	39,883
Pyrénées-Atlantiques	Nouvelle-Aquitaine	32,540	47,053
Corrèze	Nouvelle-Aquitaine	9,507	39,877
Creuse	Nouvelle-Aquitaine	3,606	31,528
Haute-Vienne	Nouvelle-Aquitaine	16,428	44,318
Ariège	Occitanie	5,051	32,839
Aveyron	Occitanie	11,136	39,795
Haute-Garonne	Occitanie	86,071	59,627
Gers	Occitanie	6,755	35,142
Lot	Occitanie	6,687	38,267
Hautes-Pyrénées	Occitanie	8,584	37,243
Tarn	Occitanie	14,427	36,734
Tarn-et-Garonne	Occitanie	9,616	36,444
Aude	Occitanie	12,985	34,335
Gard	Occitanie	29,025	38,512
Hérault	Occitanie	55,968	46,209
Lozère	Occitanie	3,009	39,287
Pyrénées-Orientales	Occitanie	17,864	36,759
Ain	Auvergne-Rhône-Alpes	25,761	36,759
Ardèche	Auvergne-Rhône-Alpes	11,234	33,987
Drôme	Auvergne-Rhône-Alpes	25,418	48,730
Isère	Auvergne-Rhône-Alpes	65,356	50,879
Loire	Auvergne-Rhône-Alpes	33,031	42,977
Rhône	Auvergne-Rhône-Alpes	141,872	74,508
Savoie	Auvergne-Rhône-Alpes	21,499	48,601
Haute-Savoie	Auvergne-Rhône-Alpes	37,142	43,834
Allier	Auvergne-Rhône-Alpes	13,014	39,051
Cantal	Auvergne-Rhône-Alpes	5,404	37,578
Haute-Loire	Auvergne-Rhône-Alpes	8,159	35,916
Puy-de-Dôme	Auvergne-Rhône-Alpes	33,376	49,971
Alpes-de-Haute-Provence	Provence-Alpes-Côte d'Azur	6,396	38,607
Hautes-Alpes	Provence-Alpes-Côte d'Azur	5,381	38,285
Alpes-Maritimes	Provence-Alpes-Côte d'Azur	57,725	52,305
Bouches-du-Rhône	Provence-Alpes-Côte d'Azur	139,713	67,848
Var	Provence-Alpes-Côte d'Azur	43,095	39,317
Vaucluse	Provence-Alpes-Côte d'Azur	26,831	47,663
Corse-du-Sud	Corsica	7,918	48,874
Haute-Corse	Corsica	6,866	36,968
