= List of Islamist quasi-states and rival governments =

This is a list of Islamist quasi-states and rival governments. It includes both Sunni and Shia Islamist states.

== Current ==
Name	Established	Capital	Map	References
Hamas government in Gaza	2007	Gaza		
(Islamic Wilayaat of Somalia) Islamic Wilayat of Somalia	2006	Jilib		
Ansaru	2012 (Note: From 2009 until 2012, part of Boko Haram.)	Areas of Northern Nigeria.		
Islamic State (Note: From 2013 to 2014 called Islamic State of Iraq and the Levant.)	2013	Areas of the Northwestern Idlib Governorate in Syria		
(Houthis) Houthi Yemen (SRC and SPC)	2010	Sanaa		
(Islamic State) Daular Musulunci	2012–2015, (Note: Between 2015 and 2016 Boko Haram was part of the Islamic State – West Africa Province.) 2016–present	Chikun		
Jama'at Nusrat al-Islam wal-Muslimin	2017	Unknown		
Jubaland (Note: Not a Islamist quasi-state but administered by a somebody supportive of Islamism.)	1998–2001, 2024 (Note: De facto independent since then.)	Kismayo		
Azawad Liberation Front	2024	Unknown		
Popular Forces administration in Gaza (elements, disputed)	2025	Al-Bayuk		

== Former ==
Name	Date	Capital	Now part of	Map	References
Islamic State of Iraq	2006–2013	Baqubah	Iraq		
Al-Qaeda in Iraq (Islamic Republic of Qaim)	2004–2006	Unknown (2004–2005); Al-Qa'im (2005); Baqubah (2006)	Iraq		
Jama'at al-Tawhid wal-Jihad	2004	Fallujah	Iraq		
Islamic Emirate of Azawad	2012–2013	Timbuktu (proclaimed); Gao (provisional)	Mali		
Ansar Dine	2012–2017	Unknown	Mali		
Republic of Logone	2015–2021	Kaga-Bandoro	Central African Republic		
Union for Peace in the Central African Republic	2018	Unknown	Central African Republic		
Hay'at Tahrir al-Sham	2017	Idlib	Syria		
Al-Nusra Front (Note: Renamed "Jabhat Fatah al-Sham" from 28 July 2016.)	2012–2017	Unknown	Syria		
Fatah al-Islam	2007	Nahr El-Bared refugee camp	Lebanon		
Islamic Emirate of Waziristan	2006	Unknown	Pakistan		
Islamic Emirate of Rafah	2009	Rafah	Palestine		
Chechen Republic of Ichkeria	1991–2000	Grozny	Russia		
Islamic Emirate of Kurdistan (Note: Part of the Kurdistan Region (1994–2001).)	2001–2003	Byara	Iraq		
Islamic Emirate of Gao (Note: Also called Islamic State of Gao.) (MOJWA and Al-Mourabitoun)	2012–circa. 2015	Gao	Jama'at Nusrat al-Islam wal-Muslimin (de facto)		
Al-Itihaad al-Islamiya	1983–1997	Luuq	Somalia		
Allied Democratic Forces (Note: when the Allied Democratic Forces were a unified group.)	2015–2019	Unknown	Democratic Republic of Congo		
Islamic Emirate of Afghanistan	1996–2001	Kabul (1996–2001); Kandahar (2001)	Islamic Emirate of Afghanistan		
Islamic Revolutionary State of Afghanistan	1980s–1990s	Bashgal Valley	Islamic Emirate of Afghanistan		
Islamic Emirate of Kunar	1989–1991	Asadabad	Islamic Emirate of Afghanistan		
Islamic Emirate of Badakhshan	1996	Badakhstan	Islamic Emirate of Afghanistan		
Emirate of Imbaba	1992	Imbaba	Egypt		
Armed Islamic Group of Algeria	1993–1995	Unknown	Algeria		
Islamic Salvation Army	Circa. 1995–Circa. 1996	Unknown	Algeria		
Junbish-e Milli	1992–1997	Unknown	Islamic Emirate of Afghanistan		
Jamiat-e Islami	1982–1989	Unknown	Islamic Emirate of Afghanistan		
Ansar al-Sharia in Libya	2012–2017	Unknown	Government of National Stability (de facto)		
Syrian Salvation Government	2017–2024	Idlib	Syria		
Islamic Djamaat of Dagestan	1998–1999	Kadar	Russia		
Caucasus Emirate	2007–Circa. 2009	Unknown	Russia		
Free Aceh Movement	1979–2005	Somewhere in Aceh	Indonesia		
Islamic State of Indonesia	1949–1962	Unknown	Indonesia		

== Small groups that held territory ==
During the Syrian Civil War, the groups Northern Storm Brigade, Al-Tawhid Brigade, Martyrs of Islam Brigade, Ajnad al-Sham and Jaysh al-Nukhba controlled some areas, however their control was ephemeral and insignificant. In Lebanon, Ansar Allah held areas for a period in 2007.

== See also ==
- List of historical unrecognized states
- List of rebel groups that control territory
