= Radio al-Furqan =

- Jilib; Somalia
- Frequency: 87.8 MHz

Ownership
- Owner: Al-Kataib Media Foundation

Links
- Website: https://radiofurqaan.com/ https://archive.radiofurqaan.com/ (archive)

Radio al-Furqan (Arabic: إِذَاعَدَّ أَلْفُرْقَانْ, Somali: Idaacadda al-Furqaan) is a Somali radio station and media outlet operating in territory controlled by al-Shabaab. It serves as a propaganda arm in support of the group, disseminating Salafi-jihadist ideology while also reporting on current events both in Somalia and internationally.

== History ==
Radio al-Furqan was initially founded in 2009 in order to disseminate material in support of al-Shabaab and its self declared Islamic Wilayat of Somalia, alongside Radio al-Andalus.

Radio al-Furqan hosts a Somali language website that functions as a platform for al-Shabaab's propaganda. It hosts videos and photo releases by al-Kataib Media Foundation that showcase attacks and militant operations. Its style is similar to Amaq News Agency as it attempts to masquerade as an independent media source while actually serving as a propaganda and radicalization tool for the Islamist group. Radio al-Furqan sometimes posts reports on military operations including photo reports from attack sites before any other media group, including Shahada News Agency.

In 2013, al-Shabaab operated Radio al-Furqan through an FM radio station under the alias Al-Ihsan local FM radio in Mogadishu before being shut down by Somali security forces on March 2, 2013, as part of efforts to disrupt the group's communications and propaganda networks. The station then relocated operations to Adado District

On December 31, 2020, the United States Africa Command (AFRICOM) conducted airstrikes in southern Somalia, launching at least four missiles targeting al-Shabaab infrastructure. According to initial reports, the strikes were intended to target Al-Shabaab's Radio Andalus; however, later confirmations indicated that Al-Furqan radio, located on the outskirts of Kunya Barrow, was hit instead, striking a blow to the group's propaganda capabilities. Radio al-Furqan released a statement calling the attack a "blatant aggression against journalists and media organization in Somalia", and emphasized that its offices "are not affiliated with or connected to Al-Shabaab"

During the COVID-19 pandemic, Radio al-Furqan and other Al-Shabaab media outlets attempted to portray the pandemic as divine punishment against the "kuffar" (infidels). Additionally, these outlets reported on Al-Shabaab’s own relief and healthcare efforts in Somalia, including the establishment of a COVID-19 treatment center
