= Territory of Jama'at al-Tawhid wal-Jihad =

Territory controlled by Jama'at al-Tawhid wal-Jihad

Jama'at al-Tawhid wal-Jihad جماعة التوحيد والجهاد
- 2004
- One of the flags flown by JTJ
- Status: Short-lived territory controlled by a terrorist group
- Capital: Fallujah
- Emir of Jama'at al-Tawhid wal-Jihad
  - 2004: Abu Musab al-Zarqawi
- De facto Field Commander of Jama'at al-Tawhid wal-Jihad
  - 2004: Umar Hadid
- Establishment: Iraq War
- History
  - Established: Circa. March 2004
  - Succeeded by Territory of Al-Qaeda in Iraq (Al-Qaeda in Iraq established): 17 October 2004
Preceded by	Succeeded by
Republic of Iraq	Territory of Al-Qaeda in Iraq
- Today part of: Republic of Iraq

The Territory of Jama'at al-Tawhid wal-Jihad refers to the territory controlled by Jama'at al-Tawhid wal-Jihad in 2004.

== Background ==
Jama'at al-Tawhid wal-Jihad was founded in Jordan in 1999 and committed various terrorist attacks in both Jordan and Iraq until 2004. However, the organization did not control any territory until March 2004.

== Territory ==
The control of Jama'at al-Tawhid wal-Jihad was limited to Fallujah, Tal Afar, and for a brief time, Samarra.

== See also ==
- Territory of the Islamic State of Iraq
- Territory of the Islamic State
- Territory of Boko Haram
- Territory of Jama'at Nasr al-Islam wal-Muslimin
- Islamic Emirate of Yemen
- Islamic Wilayat of Somalia
