= Territory of Al-Qaeda in Iraq =

Territory controlled by Al-Qaeda in Iraq

Al-Qaeda in Iraq القاعدة في العراق Al-Qāʿidah fī al-ʿIrāq
- 2004–2006
- One of the Flags used by Al-Qaeda in Iraq
- Status: Territory controlled by a rebel group
- Capital: Unknown (2004–2005); Al-Qa'im (2005); Baqubah (2006)
- Government: Emirate
- Emir
  - 2004–2006: Abu Musab Zarqawi
  - 2006: Abu Ayyub al-Masri
- Establishment: Iraq War
- History
  - Replaced the Territory of Jama'at al-Tawhid wal-Jihad (Al-Qaeda in Iraq established): 17 October 2004
  - Succeeded by the Territory of the Islamic State of Iraq: 15 October 2006
Preceded by	Succeeded by
Territory of Jama'at al-Tawhid wal-Jihad	Territory of the Islamic State of Iraq
- Today part of: Republic of Iraq

The Territory of the Al-Qaeda in Iraq or also Islamic Republic of Qaim (Arabic: جمهورية قائم الإسلامية) during the occupation of Al-Qa'im in 2005, refers to the areas controlled by the Al-Qaeda in Iraq.

== Background ==
Before Al-Qaeda in Iraq was established, Jama'at al-Tawhid wal-Jihad took over Tal Afar in late 2004.

== Territory ==
Al-Qaeda in Iraq controlled Tal Afar between late 2004 and 2005 and again in early 2006. Zarqawi had reclaimed his base in western Anbar, declared Al Qa'im as his capital, and was also operating in Hit and the Haditha Triad. Whlle Al-Qaeda in Iraq controlled territory it isn't considered to be a quasi-state like the Islamic State in Iraq or the Islamic State.

== Governance ==
During the occupation of Al-Qa'im by Al-Qaeda in Iraq in 2005, AQI adopted strict Islamic laws.

== See also ==
- Territory of the Islamic State of Iraq
- Territory of the Islamic State
- Territory of Boko Haram
- Territory of Jama'at Nusrat al-Islam wal-Muslimin
- Islamic Emirate of Somalia
