= List of rebel groups that control territory =

This is a list of active rebel groups that control territory around the world whose domains may be subnational, transnational, or international. A "rebel group" is defined here as a polity that uses armed conflict in opposition to established government (or governments) for reasons such as to seek political change or to establish, maintain, or to gain independence. Groups that "control territory" are defined as any group that hold any populated or inhabited city, town, village, hamlet, or defined area that is either directly administered by the group or under its military control. Such control may be contested and might be temporary or fluctuating, especially under the circumstance of conflict.

It does not include the governments of stable breakaway states or other states with limited recognition.

| Within state | Rebel group | Conflict | Control since | Territory controlled | Notes | Leader | Headquarters |
|---|---|---|---|---|---|---|---|
| Burkina Faso; Mali; Benin; Niger; Togo | JNIM | Insurgency in Burkina Faso; Mali War; Insurgency in Northern Benin; Insurgency in Niger | 2006 | Parts of Burkina Faso; Parts of central, southern and northern Mali; (Benin) Parts of W National Park and Pendjari National Park; Parts of southern Niger; Parts of northern Togo | Affiliate of Al-Qaeda | Iyad Ag Ghaly | Tinzaouaten (Mali) |
| Somalia | Al-Shabaab (Islamic Wilayat of Somalia) | Somali Civil War | 2008 | Large parts of southern and central Somalia | Affiliate of Al-Qaeda since 2012 | Ahmed Diriye | Jilib (Somalia) |
| Palestine | Hamas (Administration in Gaza) | Fatah–Hamas conflict | 2007 | Parts of the Gaza Strip | | Khalil al-Hayya | Gaza City |
| Palestine | (Palestine) Popular Forces (Administration in Gaza) | Popular Forces–Hamas conflict | 2024 | Eastern Rafah Governorate and parts of Khan Yunis | Opposed to Hamas, backed by Israel | Ghassan Duhine | Al-Bayuk |
| Lebanon | Hezbollah | 2026 Lebanon war | 1982 | South Lebanon, parts of north-east Lebanon and the Dahieh in Beirut | | Naim Qassem | Dahieh |
| Nigeria | Boko Haram (territory) | Boko Haram insurgency Nigerian bandit conflict | 2009 | Parts of Borno and Kaduna States | | Abu Umaimata | Chikun |
| Nigeria | Ansaru | Boko Haram insurgency Nigerian bandit conflict | 2012 | Parts of Northwest Nigeria | Split from Boko Haram in 2012 | Abu Jafa'ar | Unknown |
| Burkina Faso; Mali; Mozambique; Niger; Nigeria; Somalia; Democratic Republic of the Congo | Islamic State | Insurgency in Burkina Faso; Mali War; Insurgency in Cabo Delgado; Kivu conflict; Insurgency in Niger; Boko Haram insurgency; Somali Civil War | 2015 | Parts of Burkina Faso; (Mali) Several villages in Gao; (Mozambique) Parts of Cabo Delgado; Parts of southern Niger; (Nigeria) Parts of Borno State; (Somalia) Several villages in Bari; (Democratic Republic of the Congo) Parts of North Kivu and Ituri provinces | Designated a terrorist organization by the UN | Abu Hafs al-Hashimi al-Qurashi | Unknown |
| Nigeria | (Republic of Biafra) Indigenous People of Biafra | Insurgency in Southeastern Nigeria | 2021 | Parts of the former Republic of Biafra | The ESN is the IPOB's armed wing. | Nnamdi Kanu | Nkwerre (alleged) |
| Cameroon | Ambazonia | Anglophone Crisis | 2017 | Parts of Northwest Region (Cameroon) and Southwest Region (Cameroon) | Various factions and militant groups | | Unknown |
| Central African Republic | (Central African Republic) Coalition of Patriots for Change | Central African Republic Civil War | 2020 | Parts of Central African Republic | Coalition of multiple groups including Anti-balaka, 3R, and MPC | François Bozizé | N'Djamena, Chad |
| Mali | Azawad Liberation Front (Territory) | Mali War | 2024 | Large parts of northern Mali | | Alghabass Ag Intalla | Kidal |
| DR Congo | Mai-Mai | Kivu conflict | 2003 | Parts of northeastern DRC | Various groups | Various leaders | Depends on group |
| DR Congo | March 23 Movement | Kivu conflict | 2012 | Parts of North Kivu and South Kivu | | Bertrand Bisimwa | Unknown |
| DR Congo | Nduma Defense of Congo-Renouveau | Kivu conflict | 2015 | Parts of North Kivu | | Shimiray Mwissa Guidon | Pinga |
| DR Congo | (Zaire) Zaïre-FPAC | Kivu conflict | 2020 | Ituri Province | | Zawadi Vajeru | Unknown |
| DR Congo | CNPSC | Kivu conflict | 2017 | South Kivu and Maniema | | William Yakutumba | Unknown |
| DR Congo | CODECO | Kivu conflict | 1999 | Ituri Province | | Ali Ngadjole Ngabu | Djugu territory |
| DR Congo | Mobondo | Western DR Congo clashes | 2022 | Western DRC | | Odon Nkimona Kumbu | Kwamouth |
| Ethiopia | Fano | Fano insurgency | 2023 | Parts of the Amhara Region | Major Fano factions merged into Amhara Fano National Movement in 2026 | Zemene Kassie | Unknown |
| Libya | Libyan National Army | Libyan crisis | 2014 | Most of eastern Libya | Nominally loyal to the Government of National Stability | Khalifa Haftar | Tobruk |
| Myanmar | Kachin Independence Army | Myanmar conflict; Myanmar civil war | 1960s | Parts of Kachin State | Armed wing of Kachin Independence Organisation | N'Ban La | Laiza |
| Myanmar | People's Defence Force | Myanmar conflict; Myanmar civil war | 2021 | Parts of Sagaing Region | Armed wing of National Unity Government | Duwa Lashi La | Unknown |
| Myanmar | MNDAA | Myanmar conflict; Myanmar civil war | 1989 | Parts of northern Shan State | Armed wing of Myanmar National Truth and Justice Party | Peng Daxun | Laukkai |
| Myanmar | Karenni IEC | Myanmar conflict; Myanmar civil war | 2021 | Parts of Kayah State | | Khun Oo Reh | Unknown |
| Myanmar | Chinland | Myanmar conflict; Myanmar civil war | 2021 | Parts of northern Chin State | | Pu Zing Cung | Camp Victoria |
| Myanmar | Karen National Liberation Army Karen National Defence Organisation | Myanmar conflict; Myanmar civil war | 1947/1949 | Parts of Kayin State | Armed wings of Karen National Union | Padoh Saw Kwe Htoo Win | Lay Wah |
| Myanmar | Ta'ang National Liberation Army | Myanmar conflict; Myanmar civil war | 1992 | Parts of northern Shan State | Armed wing of Palaung State Liberation Front | Tar Aik Bong; Tar Bone Kyaw | Namhsan |
| Myanmar | Chin Brotherhood | Myanmar conflict; Myanmar civil war | 2023 | Parts of southern Chin State | | | Unknown |
| Myanmar | Arakan Army | Myanmar conflict; Myanmar civil war | 2009 | Most of Rakhine State | Armed wing of United League of Arakan | Twan Mrat Naing | Unknown |
| Myanmar | Wa State | Myanmar conflict; Myanmar civil war | 1989 | Parts of northern and southern Shan State | De facto independent state | Bao Youxiang | Pangkham |
| Myanmar | Shan State Progress Party | Myanmar conflict; Myanmar civil war | 1971 | Parts of central Shan State | | | Wan Hai, Kehsi Township |
| Myanmar | Shan State Army (RCSS) | Myanmar conflict; Myanmar civil war | 1996 | Parts of southern Shan State | Armed wing of Restoration Council of Shan State | Yawd Serk | Loi Tai Leng |
| Myanmar | Pa-O National Liberation Organisation | Myanmar conflict; Myanmar civil war | 2024 | Parts of southeastern Shan State | | Khun Thurein; Khun Kyaw Htin | Camp Laybwer, Mawkmai Township |
| Myanmar | Pa-O National Army | Myanmar conflict; Myanmar civil war | 1949 | Parts of southwestern Shan State | Armed wing of Pa-O National Organisation | Aung Kham Hti | Hopong |
| Myanmar | National Democratic Alliance Army | Myanmar conflict; Myanmar civil war | 1989 | Parts of eastern Shan State | Armed wing of Peace and Solidarity Committee | | Mong La |
| Myanmar | Karen National Army | Myanmar conflict; Myanmar civil war | 2024 | Near Myawaddy, Kayin State | | Saw Chit Thu | Shwe Kokko |
| Senegal | Movement of Democratic Forces of Casamance | Casamance conflict | 1982 | Parts of Casamance | | | Unknown |
| Sudan | SPLM–N (New Sudan) | Sudanese civil war | 2023 | Parts of southern Sudan | | Abdelaziz al-Hilu | Kauda |
| Sudan | Rapid Support Forces (Government of Peace and Unity) | Sudanese civil war | 2023 | Southern and western Sudan | | Hemedti | Nyala, Sudan |
| Syria | (Druze) Administrative Council of Jabal Bashan | Aftermath of the Syrian civil war | 2025 | Most of Suwayda Governorate | | Hikmat al-Hijri | Suwayda |
| Yemen | Houthis | Yemeni civil war | 2004 | Houthi-controlled Yemen: most of former North Yemen, parts of South Yemen | Controls the SPC | Mahdi al-Mashat | Sa'dah |
| Yemen | AQAP | Yemeni civil war | 2009 | Parts of Shabwah and Abyan governorates | Affiliate of Al-Qaeda | Sa'ad bin Atef al-Awlaki | Unknown |

== See also ==
- List of active rebel groups
- List of guerrilla movements
- List of designated terrorist groups
- List of Islamist quasi-states and rival governments
- List of ongoing armed conflicts
- Lists of active separatist movements
- Violent non-state actor
- Sovereign state
- Rival government
- Quasi-state
- Parallel state
