= Al-Kataib Media Foundation =

Media division of the Somali insurgent group Al-Shabaab

Al Kataib Media Foundation
- مؤسسة الكتائب الاعلامية
- Formation: July 27, 2010; 16 years ago
- Founder: Al-Shabbab
- Headquarters: Jilib, Somalia
- Location: Islamic Emirate of Somalia
- Official language: Somali; Arabic; English; Swahili
- Leader: Abdullahi Osman Mohamed
- Subsidiaries: Radio al-Andalus; Radio al-Furqan; Shahada News Agency

Al-Kataib Media Foundation (Arabic: الكتائب, romanized: al-kātaib, lit. 'The Battalion') is the official media wing of the insurgent group Al-Shabaab which is based in Somalia. It produces media featuring original sermons and speeches by senior Al-Shabaab commanders and leaders as well as footage of operations and attacks carried out by Al-Shabaab. Al-Kataib's first production under the name is believed to have been in 2010.

== History ==
For years, starting in 2006, al-Shabaab linked forums and websites began proliferating across the internet. Early Somali language forums and news sites sympathetic to Al-Shabaab such as Muntada al-Qimmah began to publish Al-Shabaab media releases online. The first use of the name was in early 2008, when the official website of al-Shabaab called “Kataaib” was founded and existed until 2009. Prior to the founding of Al-Kataib, the official title for the media wing of Al-Shabaab was referred to as "The Media Department of Harakat al-Shabaab al-Mujahideen.” Al-Kataib was officially founded on July 27, 2010, and began producing videos under the name shortly after.

Its first English language production was released in July 2010 titled "Mogadishu: The Crusaders Graveyard". It shows Al-Shabaab fighters in combat against Ugandan and Burundian AMISOM soldiers. It is narrated in English by a British foreign fighter named "Abu Umar" who is believed to be a senior media officer in Al-Kataib.

The documentary-style film titled "Battle of Daynille: The Burundian Bloodbath" was released on November 12, 2011.

Al-Kataib released a propaganda film in English, Arabic, and Swahili showing the Mpeketoni attacks, depicting the militants lining up suspected government employees as well as Christians and shooting them. The film undermined the Kenyan government claim that local political foes were behind the attack, despite contrary witness testimonies.

In 2015, Al-Kataib released a film called "Retributive Justice - The Westgate Siege" which describes the 2013 Westgate Mall Attack in Nairobi. At the end of the film, the narrator calls for attacks on major malls across Europe and North America, particularly the Mall of America.
