= Kenya–Thailand relations =

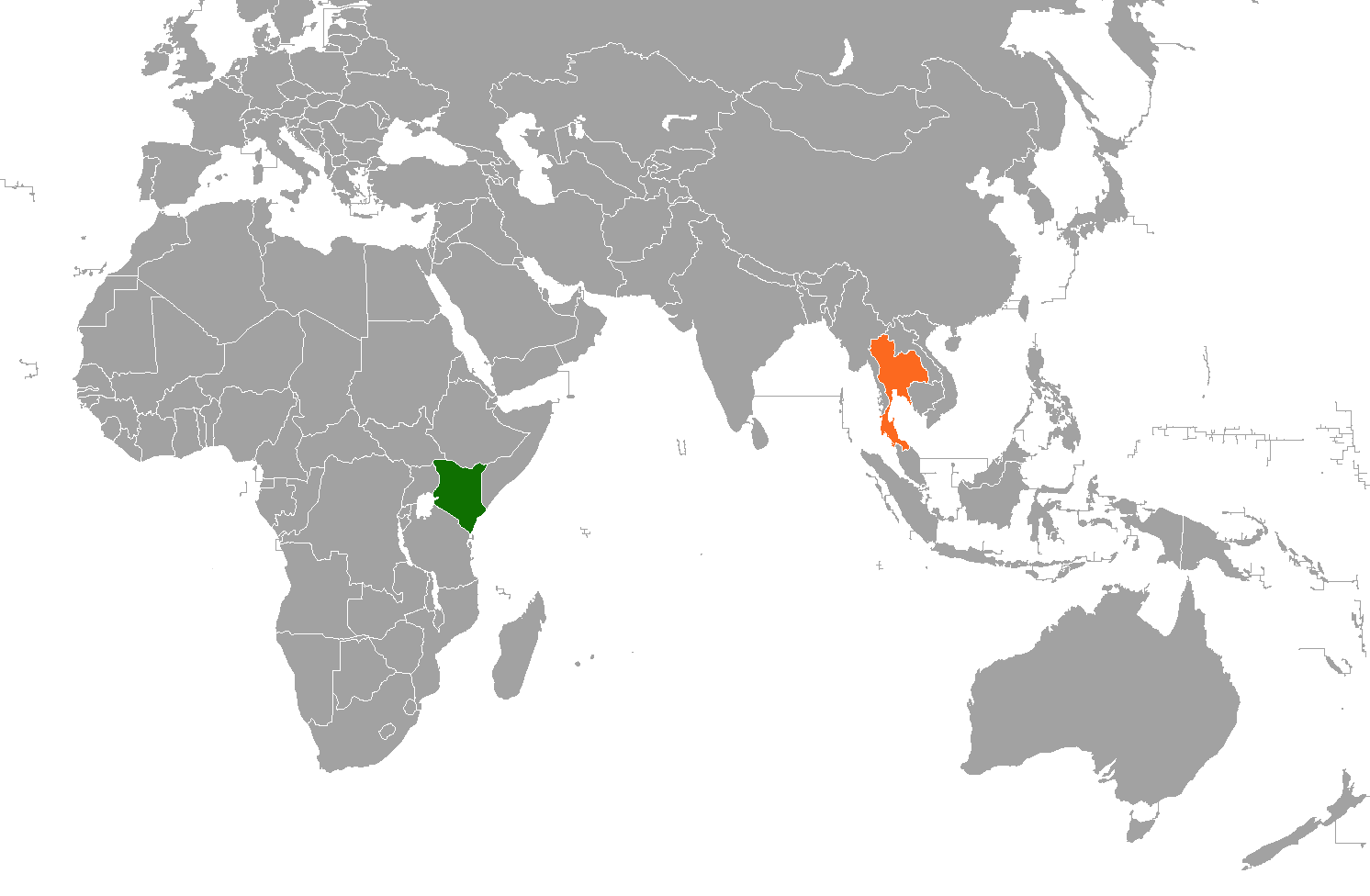
- Kenya: Thailand

Kenya–Thailand relations are bilateral relations between Kenya and Thailand. Kenya has an embassy in Bangkok which opened in 2006. The former Kenyan Consulate in Bangkok was opened in 1992.

== History ==
Diplomatic relations between Kenya and Thailand were officially established on July 25, 1967. Eleven years later, in 1978, Thailand established its resident embassy in Nairobi, which serves as a regional diplomatic hub for several neighboring East African nations. Kenya initially established diplomatic presence in Thailand through a Consulate in Bangkok in 1992, which was subsequently upgraded to a full embassy in 2006.

=== Official visits ===
Cabinet Secretary (CS) for Foreign Affairs Kenya Monica Juma met with both PM Prayut Chan-o-cha and her Thai counterpart Don Pramudwinai. She held discussions with both leaders concerning furthering bilateral and multilateral relations. Both sides also agreed to convene the 2nd Joint Commission Cooperation (JCC) in 2020.

== Incidents ==
Deputy PM Prawit Wongsuwon was quoted saying that it was OK that no Thai people died in the Nairobi DusitD2 complex attack in Nairobi, Kenya. Prawit was strongly criticised for his statement. The Dusit hotels are Thai-owned.

== Trade ==
In 2008 trade between Kenya and Thailand was worth KES. 15 billion (US$162.82 million).

Kenya exported goods worth KES. 1.2 billion (US$32.42 million) to Thailand. In addition, Thailand exported goods worth KES. 12 billion (US$130.41 million).

Kenya's main exports to Thailand include: chemical products, ore, other metals, and iron.

Thailand's main exports to Kenya include plastic resin, motor vehicles, equipment and components, granulated sugar and finished clothing.

== Resident diplomatic missions ==
- Kenya has an embassy in Bangkok.
- Thailand has an embassy in Nairobi.

== See also ==
- Foreign relations of Kenya
- Foreign relations of Thailand
