= Rebel faction =

A rebel faction usually refers to a rebellious group.

Rebel faction may also refer to:

== Politics ==
- Nationalist faction during the Spanish Civil War
- Rebel Red Guards during the Cultural Revolution

== Fiction ==
- Rebel Alliance, a fictional organization in the Star Wars franchise

== See also ==
- List of rebel groups that control territory
