= Territory of the Islamic State of Iraq =

Former quasi-state

Islamic State of Iraq دَوْلَة الْعِرَاق الإِسْلَامِيَّة Dawlat al-ʿIrāq al-ʾIslāmiyyah
- 2006–2013
- Flag
- Motto: لَا إِلهَ إِلَّا اللَّهُ، مُحَمَّدٌ رَسُولُ اللَّهِ (Arabic); Lā ʾilāha ʾillā llāh, Muhammadun rasūlu llāh (Shahada) "There is no god but God; Muhammad is the messenger of God"
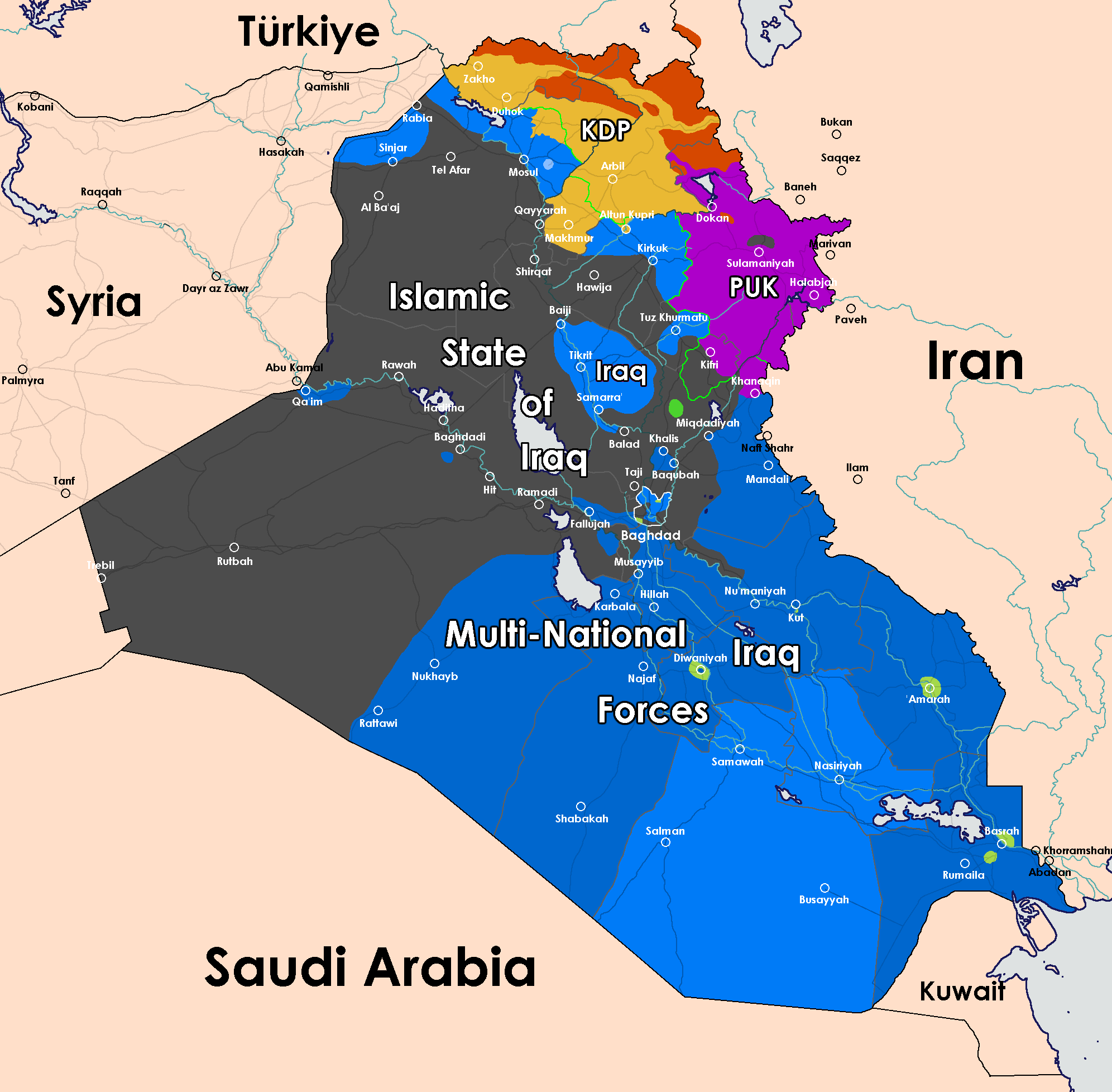
- A map depicting the Islamic State of Iraq (dark grey) at its territorial height on 20 October 2006, 5 days after its official establishment.
- Status: Unrecognized proto-state Designated as a terrorist organization
- Capital: Baqubah (2006–2007); Unknown (2007–2013)
- Government: Unitary self-proclaimed totalitarian emirate
- Emir of the Islamic State of Iraq
  - 2006–2010: Abu Omar al-Baghdadi
  - 2010–2013: Abu Bakr al-Baghdadi
- Deputy Emir of the Islamic State of Iraq
  - 2010–Unknown: Abu Abdallah al-Husseini al-Qurashi
- Prime Minister of the Islamic State of Iraq
  - Unknown–2009: Abu Abdulrahman al-Falahi
  - 2009–2010: Abu Ayyub al-Masri
  - 2010–Unknown: Abu Suleiman al-Naser
- History
  - Established (Replaced the Territory of Al-Qaeda in Iraq): 15 October 2006
  - Succeeded by the Territory of the Islamic State: 8 April 2013
Preceded by	Succeeded by
Territory of Al-Qaeda in Iraq	Territory of the Islamic State
- Today part of: Iraq

The Islamic State of Iraq (ISI) was an unrecognized quasi-state in Western Asia, where it controlled significant swaths of mostly rural and desert territory with a foothold in some urban areas, primarily in the Anbar Province in Western Iraq. It later evolved into the Islamic State of Iraq and the Levant (ISIL) or simply the Islamic State (IS).

== Declaration ==
On 15 October 2006, the Mujahideen Shura Council declared the creation of the Islamic State of Iraq over the internet. The newly created state encompassed the governorates of Baghdad, Anbar, Diyala, Kirkuk, Saladin, Nineveh, and parts of Babil and Wasit. Abu Omar al-Baghdadi was declared the organization's Emir. al-Qaeda in Iraq declared its dissolution and joined ISI in October 2006.

== Territorial control ==
In autumn 2006, AQI had taken over Baqubah, the capital of Diyala Governorate, and by March 2007, ISI had claimed Baqubah as its capital. In 2006, AQI/ISI had strongholds in Al Anbar Governorate, from Fallujah to Qaim, and were the dominant power there, according to the US. In 2007, ISI had military units in Baghdad Governorate, and in 2007–2008, ISI had strongholds in Mosul in Ninawa Governorate.

Between July and October 2007, AQI/ISI lost military bases in Anbar province and the Baghdad area and between April 2007 and April 2009, it lost considerable support, mobility and financial backing.

=== Attempt for expansion into Syria ===
In August 2011, Abu Bakr al-Baghdadi and al-Qaeda's central command authorized the Syrian al-Qaeda member Ahmed al-Sharaa to set up a Syrian offshoot of al-Qaeda, to bring down the Syrian Assad government and establish an Islamic state there. Golani was part of a small group of ISI operatives who crossed into Syria and reached out to cells of militant Islamists who had been released from Syrian military prisons in May–June 2011 and were already fighting an insurgency against Assad's security forces. Golani's group formally announced itself under the name "Jabhat al-Nusra l'Ahl as-Sham" (Support Front for the People of the Sham) on 23 January 2012.

On 22 July 2012, Al-Baghdadi released a 33-minute speech, mostly devoted to the Syrian uprising or civil war: "Our people there have fired the coup de grace at the terror that grasped the nation [Syria] for decades ... and taught the world lessons of courage and jihad and proved that injustice could only be removed by force", he said.

By the second half of 2012, Jabhat al-Nusra stood out among the array of armed groups emerging in Syria as a disciplined and effective fighting force. In December 2012, the U.S. government added Jabhat al-Nusra to its list of "Foreign Terrorist Organizations" and designated the organization as an alias of what the U.S. State Department then described as "al-Qaeda in Iraq". By January 2013, al-Nusra was a formidable force with strong popular support in Syria.

On 8 April 2013, ISI leader Abu Bakr al-Baghdadi publicly claimed that he had created Jabhat al-Nusra as a Syrian extension of the ISI and announced that he was forcibly merging it with the ISI into one group under his command, forming the "Islamic State of Iraq and the Levant" (ISIL), also known as "Islamic State of Iraq and Syria" (ISIS). Ahmed al-Sharaa rejected this merger attempt. Al-Nusra split up, some members, particularly foreign fighters, followed Baghdadi's edict and joined ISIL, others stayed with al-Sharaa.

== Government ==
=== Cabinet ===
In April 2007, the ISI declared a 'cabinet' of ten 'ministers', under its leader Abu Omar al-Baghdadi. The 'ministers' included:

- Abdullah al-Janabi, Minister of Security, was already wanted by the Iraqi Criminal Court since 2005. In 2014 he was still a prominent militant in Fallujah.
- Abu Ayyub al-Masri, Minister of War, was already wanted by Iraqi and US-coalition authorities since 2005, and was killed by US/Iraqi forces in April 2010. He was succeeded by Abu Suleiman al-Naser.

Abu Bakr al-Baghdadi, who in May 2010 would become the new leader of ISI, was before April 2010 the general supervisor of ISI's provincial sharia committees and a member of its senior consultative council.

=== Recruitment of former Saddam Hussein regime officers ===
The New York Times reported that Abu Bakr al-Baghdadi had a preference for his deputies to be former Ba'athist military and intelligence officers who had served during the Saddam Hussein regime and who knew how to fight and make strategic military plans. He built a management structure of mostly middle-aged, Hussein-era Iraqi officers overseeing the group's departments of finance, arms, local governance, military operations and recruitment. These leaders added and combined terrorist insurgency techniques, refined through years of fighting American troops, with their traditional military skills and tactics, and so made ISI a hybrid of a terrorist organization and military force. Analysts believe a Saddam-era officer, known as Haji Bakr, was appointed as military commander of ISI, heading a military council including three other former regime officers.

== History ==
=== Death of Abu Omar al-Baghdadi ===
On 18 April 2010 Abu Ayyub al-Masri and Abu Omar al-Baghdadi, leader of the Islamic State of Iraq, were killed in a joint US-Iraqi raid on a safehouse near Tikrit,

=== Appointment of Abu Bakr al-Baghdadi ===
On 16 May 2010 Abu Bakr al-Baghdadi was announced as the new leader of the Islamic State of Iraq; his deputy was Abu Abdallah al-Husseini al-Qurashi.

=== Dissolution ===
On 8 April 2013, al-Baghdadi released an audio statement in which he claimed that the al-Nusra Front had been established, financed, and supported by ISI, and that the two groups were merging under the name Islamic State of Iraq and al-Sham (ISIL, Al-Sham also translates as the Levant). However, Ahmed al-Sharaa and Ayman al-Zawahiri, the leaders of al-Nusra and al-Qaeda respectively, rejected the merger. That same month, al-Baghdadi released an audio message rejecting al-Zawahiri's ruling and declaring that the merger was going ahead. Besides that Abu Bakr al-Baghdadi still changed the name of the ISI group to the "Islamic State of Iraq and the Levant" (ISIL) and didn't reverse his statement about territorial expansion in the Levant.

== See also ==
- Territory of the Islamic State
- Territory of Boko Haram
- Territory of Jama'at Nasr al-Islam wal-Muslimin
- Islamic Emirate of Yemen
- Islamic Emirate of Somalia
