= Christian Craighead =

Pseudonymous former British special forces soldier

Christian Craighead MBE CGC
- Military career
- Allegiance: United Kingdom
- Branch: British Army
- Service years: 1992–2020
- Rank: Warrant Officer Class 2
- Units: Parachute Regiment; Pathfinder Platoon, Special Air Service
- Known for: Nairobi DusitD2 complex attack
- Conflict: Global War on Terrorism; War in Afghanistan (2001–2021); Nairobi DusitD2 complex attack; Iraq War
- Awards: Member of the Order of the British Empire, Conspicuous Gallantry Cross

Christian Craighead is the pseudonym of a former British Army soldier and member of the United Kingdom Special Forces. He became publicly known for his part in the response to the Nairobi DusitD2 complex attack in January 2019, during which he assisted Kenyan security forces and helped evacuate civilians. He was subsequently awarded the Conspicuous Gallantry Cross (CGC).

Craighead later sought permission from the Ministry of Defence (MoD) to publish a memoir about the attack. In 2023, the High Court dismissed his challenge to the MoD's refusal, holding that the restriction on publication was a proportionate interference with his right to freedom of expression.

== Military service ==
Craighead joined the British Army at the age of 16 and served for 28 years. His service included the Parachute Regiment, the Pathfinder Platoon and almost 15 years with 22 Special Air Service (SAS). He served in Iraq and Afghanistan and retired from active service on 7 September 2020.

"Christian Craighead" is not his legal name. A November 2022 anonymity order in litigation between Craighead and the Secretary of State for Defence prohibited publication of information identifying him and directed the claimant be referred to by the pseudonym Christian Craighead or the initials CC.

== DusitD2 attack ==
On 15 January 2019, al-Shabaab militants attacked the DusitD2 hotel and office complex in Nairobi, Kenya. Craighead was then serving in Kenya as part of a British training team. Contemporary reports did not name him, but described an SAS soldier who joined the Kenyan response and mentored Kenyan personnel at the scene.

Photographs and witness accounts showed the soldier helping wounded people, escorting civilians from the complex and coordinating with Kenyan forces. Forces News later reported he had been off duty when the attack began, entered the complex and killed two of the four gunmen; nearly 700 people were evacuated during the wider security operation.

Craighead received the Conspicuous Gallantry Cross for his actions during the attack. The CGC is the United Kingdom's second-level military decoration for gallantry in combat, below the Victoria Cross. He had previously been appointed a Member of the Order of the British Empire (MBE).

In the later litigation over his memoir, the Secretary of State accepted the usual policy of neither confirming nor denying UK Special Forces activity no longer needed to be maintained in relation to the incident, and Craighead could say publicly he was the serviceman involved.

== Memoir and legal proceedings ==
In November 2023, using the name Chris Craighead, he published the children's book The Wrong Wolf, illustrated by Matthew Klein. The 50-page story follows a wolf who regards himself as different and, through a journey involving loss, mercy and self-sacrifice, learns his origins do not determine his future. The story is inspired by Craighead's life and some proceeds were to be donated to the United States charity Frontline Healing Foundation.

After retiring, Craighead wrote One Man In, a memoir centred on the DusitD2 attack. His confidentiality agreement with the MoD required him to obtain express prior authority in writing before disclosing information about UK Special Forces. The MoD refused authorisation on 25 July 2022, concluding publication could damage national security and the operational effectiveness of UK Special Forces.

Craighead sought judicial review, arguing that the refusal unlawfully interfered with his freedom of expression under Article 10 of the European Convention on Human Rights. On 3 October 2023, Mrs Justice Steyn dismissed the claim. She found that Craighead's voluntary confidentiality agreement reduced the weight of his Article 10 claim and that the MoD's refusal was proportionate to the risks it had identified. The substantive hearing was held in private because of the classified evidence, while the court issued an open judgment and a confidential schedule.

In June 2026 it was reported that Craighead intended to publish the memoir in the United States despite the continuing dispute with the MoD. Threshold Editions released the book in the United States on 15 September 2026.

== Bibliography ==
- Craighead, Chris (2023). The Wrong Wolf. Illustrated by Matthew Klein. BookBaby. ISBN 979-8-3509-2510-4.
- Craighead, Christian (2026). One Man In: The Explosive Firsthand Account of the Lone Special-Ops Commando Who Fought Off a Major Terrorist Attack in Kenya. Threshold Editions. ISBN 978-1-9821-7733-1.
