= Radio al-Andalus =

Radio Al-Andalus
- Jilib; Somalia
- Frequencies: Various

Programming
- Languages: Arabic, Somali, Swahili, English

Ownership
- Owner: Al-Kataib Media Foundation

History
- First air date: August 19, 2009

Technical information
- Transmitter coordinates: 0.496101°N 42.783788°E

Links
- Website: https://calamada1.com/

Radio al-Andalus (Arabic: أذاعة الأندلس, romanized: Idāad al-Andalus, Somali: Idaacadda Andalus, Swahili: Redio al-Andalus) or sometimes called Radio Andalus is a radio station that was created by Al-Shabaab's media outlet, Al-Kataib Media Foundation in 2009.

== History ==
Radio al-Andalus was created in 2009 as a way to disseminate Jihadist propaganda during a propaganda effort by Al-Kataib Media Foundation to expand its methods of spreading propaganda and a way to gain a financial outlet with donations, it was created alongside Quran Karim Radio FM, Somali Wayen Radio FM, HornAfrik Radio though Radio al-Andalus is the largest. Radio al-Andalus provides al-Shabaab with a large financial platform, and can be considered the largest, in Somalia as it operates all throughout Somalia and internationally through social media and online forums. Through the dissemination of propaganda, Radio al-Andalus, alongside Shadada News Agency, is used as a way to claim attacks. Radio al-Andalus is not only used for the spreading of Jihadist ideologies but also anti-Ethiopian sentiment. Radio al-Andalus relied on mostly seized radio equipment from organizations like BBC News Somali and Voice of America Somali which they used to broadcast their radio station in the languages of Somali, Arabic, Swahili, and English. Radio al-Andalus, besides the Jihadist sentiments and the use of it for recruitment by Al-Shabaab, runs like an ordinary radio station. The station plays nasheeds (music is forbidden in Islam), talks about local and international news, and has ways for viewers and news figures to call in.

Radio al-Andalus was headquartered in the small village of Bariire 50 miles west of the Somali capital, Mogadishu, that is controlled by Al-Shabaab, which was raided by members of the United States Navy SEALs which led to the death of one of the SEAL team members in 2017. One of its station went offline in March of 2012 after the militant group Ahlu Sunna Waljama'a took over the town of Dhusamareeb, there, members of Ahlu Sunna Waljama'a dismantled all the transmitters that Radio al-Andalus used to broadcast the radio station, but went back online and running shortly after. The radio station's headquarters moved to Jilib, Somalia where it remains active. In 2018, an airstrike conducted by the United States Air Force struck and destroyed the building that the radio station was being broadcast from. It continues to exist with radio transmitters in most major towns under the control of al-Shabaab.

Radio al-Andalus is considered an alias and a financer of Al-Shabaab by the Australian National Security and is designated as a terrorist organization.
