= Jilib District =

Jilib
- District
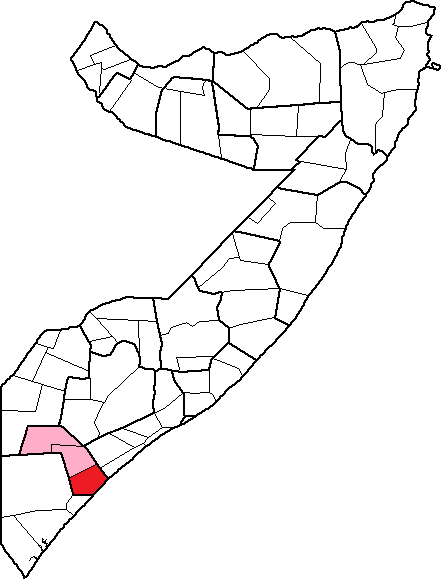
- Country: Somalia
- Region: Middle Juba
- Capital: Jilib
- Control: al-Shabaab
- Time zone: UTC+3 (EAT)

Jilib District (Somali: Degmada Jilib) is a district in the southern Middle Juba (Jubbada Dhexe) region of Somalia. Its capital lies at Jilib.

== History ==
Jilib District, located along the Juba River in southern Somalia's Middle Juba region, has historically been an important agricultural and strategic area inhabited mainly by Somali-Bantus-(Shambara) sub- clan.

During the Somali civil war starting in the early 1990s, control of Jilib shifted among various armed factions, causing significant displacement and disruption of local governance. In the 2000s and 2010s, Jilib became a stronghold for the militant group Al-Shabaab, which used the district as a base for its operations and governance, severely limiting development and federal government control.

Efforts by the Federal Government of Somalia, supported by the African Union Mission in Somalia (AMISOM) and allied forces, have aimed to retake and stabilize Jilib in recent years. Despite these efforts, security challenges continue to hamper recovery and governance in the district.
