= 2004 Ashura massacre =

Anti-Shia terrorist attacks in Iraq during the U.S. occupation

Karbala Ashura massacre
- Part of Iraqi insurgency (2003–2006) in Iraqi insurgency (2003–2011)
- Location: Karbala and Baghdad, Iraq
- Date: March 2, 2004
- Target: Shi'a Muslims commemorating the Ashura festival, including the Kazimiya shrine
- Attack type: bombing (including car bombs and suicide bombers); mortar, grenade and rocket attacks
- Deaths: 170
- Injuries: at least 150–200
- Perpetrator: Unknown (Jama'at al-Tawhid wal-Jihad suspected)
- Motive: Anti-Shi'a sentiment

The Ashura massacre of March 2, 2004 in Iraq was a series of planned terrorist explosions that killed at least 80–100 and injured at least 200 Iraqi Shi'a Muslims commemorating the Day of Ashura. The bombings brought one of the deadliest days in the Iraq occupation after the Iraq War to topple Saddam Hussein.

== The attacks ==
Nine explosions were detonated in Karbala, accompanied by mortar, grenade, and rocket fire, killing over 100 people, while three explosions near the Kadhimiya Shrine in Baghdad killed 58 more. Though the attack involved armed squads, car bombs, and up to a dozen suicide bombers, there was also an explosive-laden vehicle which was intercepted while trying to enter Basra, as were two suicide bombers in Karbala and others in Baghdad who had entered via Syria. The squads armed with rockets and small arms were meant to kill those wounded by the blasts as well as to trap those trying to flee the carnage.

Brigadier General Mark Kimmitt, the American commander in Baghdad, accused Abu Musab al-Zarqawi as being "one of the chief suspects" involved in directing the attacks. Ayatollah Ali al-Sistani, a highly influential Shiite in Iraq, blamed the U.S. for allowing the attacks to occur, but Kimmitt had agreed with Shiite leaders to vacate the shrines out of respect for cultural differences.

US appointed Iraqi governing council condemned the attacks and announced a mourning period of three days. Due to this decision, the signing of an interim Iraqi constitution, which had been scheduled for Wednesday, was postponed as confirmed by Abdul Aziz al-Hakim, a council member.
