= Rival government =

Claims to be the legitimate government of a sovereign state

A rival government is a political group that claims to be the legitimate government (exclusive mandate) of a sovereign state in opposition to the another government of that state. Such governments tend to be formed in the aftermath of a civil war, revolution, or military coup. They differ from a government in exile as they are based in, and have control over territory within the claimed state.

== Current rival governments ==
=== National level ===
State	Rival government	UN-recognized government	Established	Notes
China	Republic of China	People's Republic of China	1971	Originally founded in 1912 following the 1911 Revolution. The Nationalist government took control with the Northern Expedition in the 1920s. Collapsed following the Chinese Civil War and retreated to Taiwan. Lost its international recognition with the United Nations General Assembly Resolution 2758 (XXVI) and the One China policy of the mainland Communist government.
Palestine	Hamas administration	Fatah-led Palestinian Authority	2007	Established by Hamas in 2007 following the Battle of Gaza in opposition to the Fatah-led Government of Palestine. Based in Gaza City and controls parts of the Gaza Strip.
Myanmar	National Unity Government of Myanmar	None	2021	Established by the Committee Representing Pyidaungsu Hluttaw following the 2021 Myanmar coup d'état and subsequent Myanmar Civil War in opposition to the provisional government appointed by the State Administration Council. Operates in hiding within areas of Myanmar under its control. In January 2025, Lwin Ko Latt stated that the NUG is headquartered in Sagaing Region.
Myanmar	Second Min Aung Hlaing cabinet	None	2026	Formed following the 2025–26 Myanmar general election as the successor to the military junta that took power after the 2021 Myanmar coup d'état. The United Nations List of Heads of State, Heads of Government, and Ministers for Foreign Affairs does not list Min Aung Hlaing as president of Myanmar, instead continuing to list Win Myint as president and Aung San Suu Kyi as foreign minister.
Yemen	Supreme Political Council	Presidential Leadership Council	2016	Established by the Houthis following their takeover of Sanaa in September 2014 during the Yemeni civil war in opposition to the Presidential Leadership Council. Based in Sanaa and has control over parts of northern and western Yemen. Recognised by Iran as the legitimate government of Yemen and was previously recognised by Syria under the Ba'athist regime.
Libya	Government of National Stability	Government of National Unity	2022	Formed by the House of Representatives in March 2022 in opposition to the Government of National Unity appointed by the Libyan Presidential Council. Based in Tobruk and controls most of eastern Libya.
Sudan	Government of Peace and Unity	Transitional Sovereignty Council	2025	Established by the Rapid Support Forces in April 2025 during the Sudanese Civil War in opposition to the cabinet appointed by the Transitional Sovereignty Council. Based in Nyala and controls most of Darfur and parts of Kordofan.
Democratic Republic of the Congo	Front for the Refoundation of the Nation	Suminwa government	2026	Established by multiple armed groups, most notably the Congo River Alliance, during the conflict in Kivu in opposition to the government of Felix Tshisekedi. Based in Goma and controls most of the Kivu region.

=== Sub-national level ===
Government	State	Established	Notes
People's Government of Kokang	Republic of the Union of Myanmar	2011	Established in response to the Presidential Decree No.22/2011, which officially established the Kokang Self-Administered Zone.
West Africa Province	Federal Republic of Nigeria	2015	The Islamic State's West Africa Province runs a rival administration to that of the Nigerian government.
Jama'at Nusrat al-Islam wal-Muslimin	Republic of Mali	2017	JNIM operates a decentralized proto-state model in areas under its control and presents itself as an alternative to the Malian government.
State of Chinland	Republic of the Union of Myanmar	2023	A provisional administration for the Chin State established by ethnic armed organizations during the Myanmar civil war.
Karenni State Interim Executive Council	Republic of the Union of Myanmar	2023	A provisional administration for the Kayah State established by ethnic armed organizations during the Myanmar civil war.
Administrative Council of Jabal Bashan	Syrian Arab Republic	2026	Replaced the Supreme Legal Committee in Suwayda.
(Palestine) Popular Forces administration	Hamas administration	2025	Established in 2025 by the Popular Forces in opposition to the Hamas administration in the Gaza Strip during the Gaza war. Based in al-Bayuk and controls most of eastern Rafah and Khan Yunis.
Counter-Terrorism Strike Force administration	Hamas administration	2025	The CSF had emerged in August 2025 as a rival administration to Hamas'. It is based in and governs the village of Kizan al-Najjar in the Khan Yunis Governorate of the Gaza Strip.
(Palestine) Shuja'iyya Popular Defense Forces administration	Hamas administration	2025	Operating within the Israeli-controlled side of the Yellow Line, the SPDF is based in the Shuja'iyya neighborhood of Gaza City, and is also active in nearby Zeitoun and Tuffah. Leader of the SPDF, Rami Hilles claims to have 500 people within his territory as of November 2025. According to Rami Hilles, the group provides humanitarian services in Shuja'iyya and allegedly coordinates with the Palestinian Authority (PA).
(British Indian Ocean Territory) Chagossian Government	Government of the British Indian Ocean Territory	2025	Established in December 2025. Aims to prevent the transfer of the Chagos archipelago to Mauritius. Initially based in the United Kingdom before moving to Île du Coin within the territory itself in February 2026.

== Former rival governments ==
Government	State	Established	Disestablished	Notes
Finnish Socialist Workers' Republic	White Finland	29 January 1918	5 May 1918	Established by the Finnish People's Delegation during the Finnish Civil War. Dissolved following the Whites' victory, which resulted in the Reds fleeing to Russia.
Russian State	Russian Soviet Federative Socialist Republic	23 September 1918	7 February 1920	Established following the State Meeting in Ufa during the Russian Civil War. Dissolved following the Great Siberian Ice March, which resulted in the Red Army emerging victorious.
Hungarian Soviet Republic	First Hungarian Republic	21 March 1919	3 August 1919	Established by the Hungarian Communist Party during the interwar period. The Soviet Republic would come to an end after the capture of Budapest during Hungarian–Romanian War.
State of Turkey	Ottoman Empire	23 April 1920	1 November 1922	Established on 23 April 1920 during the Turkish War of Independence in opposition to the Istanbul Government. Led by Mustafa Kemal and the Grand National Assembly in Ankara, it claimed authority over Turkey and organized resistance against both occupying Allied forces and Ottoman collaborators. De facto rivalry ended on 1 November 1922 with the abolition of the sultanate, after which the Ankara government became the recognized central government of the Republic of Turkey.
Spanish State	Second Spanish Republic	1936	1939	Established as a rival government to the Second Spanish Republic during the Spanish Civil War. After the capture of Madrid, Francisco Franco proclaimed the Spanish State to replace the defeated Spanish Republic.
Provisional Democratic Government	Kingdom of Greece	1947	1949	Established by the Communist Party of Greece in December 1947 during the Greek Civil War. It was defeated in 1949 in the Operation Pyrsos and officially dissolved in 1950.
People's Republic of China	(Republic of China (1912–1949)) Republic of China	1949	Recognised 1971	Proclaimed by the Chinese Communist Party in 1949 after its victory in the Chinese Civil War. Gained international recognition with the United Nations General Assembly Resolution 2758 (XXVI).
Governments of Imre Nagy	Hungarian People's Republic	1956	1956	Established by anti-Soviet revolutionaries in opposition to the Soviet-backed Revolutionary Workers'-Peasants' Government of Hungary during the Hungarian Revolution of 1956. Suppressed following the Soviet invasion of the country.
Revolutionary Government of the Republic of Indonesia	Indonesia	1958	1961	Established to combat the Djuanda Cabinet-backed Guided democracy government in Indonesia led by Sukarno, the revolutionary government was eventually defeated and its leaders imprisoned.
Free Republic of the Congo	Republic of the Congo	1960	1962	Established on 12 December 1960 following Patrice Lumumba's deposition during the Congo Crisis. It was soon recognised by Socialist and African countries. In late 1961 and early 1962, the Chamber of Deputies demanded the return of Prime Minister Antoine Gizenga to the capital and military chief Victor Lundula pledged allegiance to the official government and arrested Gizenga ending the government.
People's Republic of the Congo	(First Congolese Republic) Democratic Republic of the Congo	1963	1965	Established in August 1964 following the conquest of Stanleyville during the Congo Crisis by the Simba rebels. In 1965, the last rebel strongholds fell.
(Dominican Republic) Government of National Reconstruction	(Dominican Republic) Constitutionalist Government	May 7, 1965	August 30, 1965	Established in response to the constitutionalist forces in the Dominican Civil War.
Republic of South Vietnam	(South Vietnam) Republic of Vietnam	1969	1976	Established on 8 June 1969 during the Vietnam War in opposition to the Republic of Vietnam (South Vietnam). Administered Viet Cong held areas of South Vietnam. Was recognized as the government of South Vietnam by most socialist states and Malta. Gained complete control of South Vietnam after the Fall of Saigon on 30 April 1975. Was disbanded when South Vietnam merged with North Vietnam on 2 July 1976 to form the Socialist Republic of Vietnam.
Republic of China	People's Republic of China	1971	1991	Originally founded in 1912 following the 1911 Revolution. The Nationalist government took control with the Northern Expedition in the 1920s. Collapsed following the Chinese Civil War and retreated to Taiwan. Lost its international recognition with the United Nations General Assembly Resolution 2758 (XXVI) and the One China policy of the mainland Communist government. In 1991, it repealed the Temporary Provisions against the Communist Rebellion, ceasing to regard the Chinese Communist Party as a rebellious group and acknowledged its control over mainland China.
Democratic People's Republic of Angola	People's Republic of Angola/Republic of Angola	1975	2002	Established on 11 November 1975 during the Angolan Civil War by the originally Maoist UNITA. After the death of Jonas Savimbi, UNITA demobilized and became an ordinary political party.
National Resistance Government of Mozambique	People's Republic of Mozambique/Republic of Mozambique	1977	1992	Established in 1977 during the Mozambican Civil War by the rebel group RENAMO, sponsored by Rhodesia and South Africa. After the Rome General Peace Accords RENAMO demobilized and became an ordinary political party, until an insurgency began in 2013.
People's Republic of Kampuchea	Democratic Kampuchea	1979	1992	Established by the Kampuchean United Front for National Salvation in opposition to Democratic Kampuchea following the capture of Phnom Penh on 7 January 1979 by Vietnamese forces during the Cambodian–Vietnamese War. Based in Phnom Penh and administered most of Cambodia. The previous regime continued to be recognised as Cambodia's legitimate government by most countries and held the country's seat at the United Nations. The People's Republic of Kampuchea changed its name to the State of Cambodia in 1989 and was disestablished when Cambodia came under United Nations administration in 1992.
People's Republic of New Democracy	Peru	17 May 1980	12 September 1992	Established by Shining Path during the internal conflict in Peru. The rival government, which controlled large amounts of rural areas in the Andean highlands, served as a core element of the group's interpretation of communism, declaring its territories "liberated zones" and promoting the use of communes and collective farms. De facto dissolved following the capture of Abimael Guzmán, which instigated a gradual loss of territory for Shining Path outside small pockets inside the Valle de los Ríos Apurímac, Ene y Mantaro.
Provisional Government of the Philippines	(Philippines) Fourth Philippine Republic	22 February 1986	25 February 1986	Created during the People Power Revolution as a response to the 1986 Philippine presidential election. Provisional government was later set up after Ferdinand Marcos fled the country.
(Liberia) National Patriotic Reconstruction Assembly Government	Republic of Liberia	24 December 1989	2 August 1997	Established by the National Patriotic Front of Liberia during the First Liberian Civil War in opposition to the official government of Samuel Doe. Eventually took control of 90% of Liberia following Doe's overthrow and execution, resulting in it becoming the new central government following Taylor's victory in the 1997 Liberian general election.
(Soviet Union) State Committee on the State of Emergency	(Soviet Union) Union of Soviet Socialist Republics	19 August 1991	21 August 1991	Established on 19 August 1991 during the August Coup by communist hardliners, in opposition to official government of Mikhail Gorbachev. Led by Gennady Yanayev as acting president, it claimed authority over the Soviet Union under a state of emergency while de facto controlling key government buildings including the Kremlin and military units in Moscow. The committee self-dissolved and members were arrested on 21 August 1991 after failing to seize full control.
Supreme Soviet Government	Russian Federation	September 1993	October 1993	Established on 21 September 1993 during the 1993 Russian constitutional crisis in opposition to the Yeltsin government. Led by Alexander Rutskoy as Acting President and Ruslan Khasbulatov as Supreme Soviet Chairman, it claimed authority over Russia while de facto controlling only the Russian White House and adjacent streets in Moscow. De facto Disestablished on 4 October 1993 when Yeltsin's forces stormed the building.
Provisional Government of National Union and National Salvation of Cambodia	Kingdom of Cambodia	1994	1998	Established by remnants of the Khmer Rouge. It was based in the Pailin municipality. Dissolved following Pol Pot's death.
Islamic Emirate of Afghanistan	Islamic State of Afghanistan	1996	2001	Established by the Taliban on 4 April 1996 during the Afghan conflict in opposition to the Islamic State of Afghanistan. Was initially based in Kandahar before capturing Kabul on 27 September 1996 and gaining control of approximately 90% of Afghanistan by the end of 2000. The Islamic Emirate of Afghanistan was recognised by Pakistan, Saudi Arabia, and the United Arab Emirates as the legitimate government of Afghanistan. The Taliban were forced out of Kabul and Kandahar in 2001 during the United States invasion of Afghanistan. The Taliban maintained an insurgency against the Afghan government and, following a decision by US president Donald Trump to withdraw US forces from Afghanistan beginning in 2020, recaptured Kabul on 15 August 2021.
(Venezuela) Interim government of Pedro Carmona	Bolivarian Republic of Venezuela	12 April 2002	13 April 2002	Established after the failed 2002 Venezuelan coup attempt that subsequently removed Hugo Chávez from the presidency. Chávez returned to power hours after the coup.
(Libya) National Transitional Council	(Libya) Great Socialist People's Libyan Arab Jamahiriya	2011	2012	Established by Anti-Gaddafi forces in February 2011 during the First Libyan Civil War in opposition to the Great Socialist People's Libyan Arab Jamahiriya. Based in Benghazi. Gained control of eastern Libya in March 2011 and captured Tripoli in August 2011. The council gained recognition by numerous states as the legitimate government of Libya and was granted the country's seat in the United Nations in September 2011. Was superseded by the cabinet appointed by the General National Congress elected in 2012.
Syrian Interim Government	Ba'athist Syria	2013	2025	Established by the Syrian National Coalition in March 2013 during the Syrian Civil War in opposition to Ba'athist Syria. Based in Azaz and administered parts of northern Syria. Was absorbed into the Syrian caretaker government in January 2025 following the Fall of the Assad regime.
(Libya) National Salvation Government	State of Libya (Second Al-Thani Cabinet)	2014	2016	Break-away faction of the General National Congress which did not support the formation of the Second Al-Thani Cabinet, originally founded in September 2014. Based in Tripoli and controlled western Libya. Was recognized as the legitimate government of Libya by Turkey, Sudan, Qatar, and Ukraine. Was initially dissolved and absorbed into the internationally recognized Government of National Accord in April 2016 following the Libyan Political Agreement.
Houthi-controlled Yemen (Supreme Revolutionary Committee)	Republic of Yemen	2015	2016	Established by the Houthis following their takeover of Sanaa in September 2014 during the Yemeni civil war in opposition to the official government. Based in Sanaa and had control over parts of northern and western Yemen. In 2016, it was replaced by the Supreme Political Council.
(Libya) Second Al-Thani Cabinet	State of Libya (Government of National Accord)	2016	2021	Established by the House of Representatives in September 2014 following the 2014 Libyan parliamentary election. Based in Tobruk and controlled eastern Libya. Was recognized by most countries as the legitimate government of Libya until the establishment of the Government of National Accord in March 2016 following the Libyan Political Agreement. Continued to exist in opposition to the Government of National Accord with limited international recognition until both governments merged into the Government of National Unity following the Libyan Political Dialogue Forum in early 2021.
(Libya) National Salvation Government	State of Libya (Government of National Accord)	2016	2017	Break-away faction of the General National Congress which did not support the formation of the Government of National Accord following the Libyan Political Agreement. It was reestablished during an attempted coup d'état against the Government of National Accord in October 2016. However, it received no international recognition or support following the coup attempt and was again dissolved and absorbed into the Government of National Accord in March 2017.
Syrian Salvation Government	Ba'athist Syria	2017	2024	Established by Hay'at Tahrir al-Sham in November 2017 during the Syrian Civil War in opposition to Ba'athist Syria. Based in Idlib and administered parts of Idlib Governorate. Was superseded by the Syrian caretaker government in December 2024 following the Fall of the Assad regime.
Interim government of Juan Guaidó	Bolivarian Republic of Venezuela	23 January 2019	5 January 2023	Led by then National Assembly President Juan Guaidó to challenge the Nicolás Maduro government. Despite its lack of power, the government was in charge of national assets abroad due to recognition from 60 governments. The interim government was dissolved On 30 December 2022 and was finalized on 5 January 2023.
(Benin) Military Committee for Refoundation	Republic of Benin	7 December 2025	7 December 2025	A short-lived military junta which controlled areas in Cotonou for some hours and was led by Pascal Tigri.
(Niger) Armed Forces for the Restoration of the Fatherland	Republic of Niger	28 August 2026	29 August 2026	A short-lived military junta which controlled areas in Niamey.

=== Former rival governments at a sub-national level ===
Government	State	Established	Disestablished	Notes
AP Western Bosnia	Republic of Bosnia and Herzegovina	1993	1995	Established by Fikret Abdić in September 1993 during the Intra-Bosnian Muslim War in opposition to the Republic of Bosnia and Herzegovina. Based in Velika Kladuša and administered parts of Cazin. Maintained close cooperation with Republika Srpska and the Republic of Serbian Krajina. Was dissolved in August 1995 following the Operation Storm offensive by Croat and Governmental forces.
(South Yemen) Southern Transitional Council	Republic of Yemen	2017	2026	Established in 2017 and self-government declared in 2020. Controlled parts of the former South Yemen including its capital, Aden. Disbanded in January 2026.
Congo River Alliance	Democratic Republic of Congo	2023	2026	The Congo River Alliance (AFC) controlled 34,000 square kilometers of territory in the North Kivu and South Kivu areas including the provincial capitals of Goma and Bukavu. In this territory, the AFC has appointed rival provincial governors in the areas of North Kivu and South Kivu provinces that were under its control. The group was dissolved on 16 October 2026 following the establishment of the Front for the Refoundation of the Nation.
Supreme Legal Committee in Suwayda	Syrian Arab Republic	2025	2026	An administration established by the Druze armed forces following clashes in the region and the partial withdrawal of central government institutions. The SLCS was headed by a Druze sheikh Hikmat al-Hijri.

== Occupation zones ==
These are rival governments which were established simultaneously in the Soviet and Western occupation zones and claim sole jurisdiction over their respective region but both are recognised by the international community.

Eastern Bloc	Western Bloc	Established	Disestablished	Notes
(North Vietnam) Democratic Republic of Vietnam	(South Vietnam) Provisional Central Government of Vietnam (South Vietnam) State of Vietnam (South Vietnam) Republic of Vietnam	1945/54	1975	The DRV was declared in 1945 and the State of Vietnam was established in 1949. Vietnam was properly split after the 1954 Geneva Conference and division followed temporary military occupation zones set at the 17th parallel, with the North supported by the Soviet Union and China, and the South supported by the United States. While both were recognized by different blocs of the international community, they were never simultaneously admitted to the United Nations and claimed the exclusive mandate over Vietnam. They fought a war which ended with the dissolution of South Vietnam.
(Provisional People's Committee for North Korea) Provisional People's Committee of North Korea (Provisional People's Committee for North Korea) People's Committee of North Korea (North Korea) Democratic People's Republic of Korea	Interim Legislative Assembly Constituent National Assembly (South Korea) Republic of Korea	1945/48	ongoing	Both were established in 1948 and claimed to the exclusive mandate over Korea. They fought a war which did not end with a peace treaty but an armistice signed in 1953. Both were accepted as members of the United Nations in 1991 with the Resolution 702 but have not established official diplomatic relationships with each other. North Korea officially abandoned its goal of reuniting Korea in 2024.
Liberated Zone People's Republic of China	Republic of China	1946/49	ongoing	The People's Republic of China was proclaimed in 1949 by the Chinese Communist Party while the Republic of China under the Kuomintang retreated to the former Japanese colony of Taiwan while claiming to the exclusive mandate over all of China. As a result of a war fought between the two parties, the province of Fujian was split into two administrations with the PRC retaining the majority of Fujian and the ROC maintained a rump Fujian province consisting of Kinmen and Matsu Islands. The ROC lost international recognition to the PRC in 1971 under United Nations General Assembly Resolution 2758 (XXVI) which affirms the PRC as the sole legitimate government of China under the One China policy.
German Democratic Republic	(West Germany) Federal Republic of Germany	1949	1990	Both were established in 1949 and claimed the exclusive mandate over Germany. The Hallstein Doctrine prevented states that recognised East Germany from establishing diplomatic relationships with West Germany. The Ostpolitik and Basic Treaty, 1972 started mutual recognition and both were accepted as members of the United Nations in 1973 with Resolution 335. In 1974, East Germany removed their sole claim from the constitution. Germany reunified in 1990 under the Federal Republic of Germany.

== See also ==
- Anti-king
- Antipope
- Colour revolution
- Dual power
- Government in exile
- List of Islamist quasi-states and rival governments
- List of states with limited recognition
- List of rebel groups that control territory
- Parallel state
- Provisional government
- Quasi-state
- Regime change
- Rump state
- Schism
- Shadow cabinet
- State collapse
- War of succession
