= Territory of the Azawad Liberation Front =

Territory administrated by the FLA

Azawad Liberation Front
- Flag Emblem

- Maps of the Mali War (Azawad Liberation Front territory shown in green)
- Capital: Unknown

Government
  - Leader: Alghabass Ag Intalla
  - Spokesperson: Mohamed Elmaouloud Ramadane
- Establishment: Sahel War (Mali War)
  - Established: 30 November 2024
Preceded by
Republic of Mali

The Azawad Liberation Front (FLA) maintains control over several territories in northern Mali, primarily in the Kidal Region, as part of the ongoing war in Mali. The FLA emerged from the merger of several Azawad nationalist movements and armed groups. During the 2026 Mali offensives, the FLA expanded its control by capturing several settlements and military positions. In some areas control is shared with Jama'at Nusrat al-Islam wal-Muslimin (JNIM).

== Background ==
=== Azawad (2012–2013) ===
On the 6 April 2012 the National Movement for the Liberation of Azawad, the predecessor organization of the Azawad Liberation Front, declared the establishment of Azawad, a short-lived unrecognized state. One year and two months later in late June 2013 during the Battle of Gao and the Fall of Timbuktu Azawad fell on 29 June 2013 and various areas of Azawad were taken over by Ansar Dine and the Movement for Oneness and Jihad in West Africa.

Territory controlled by Tuareg rebels as of 3 April 2012

=== 2013–2024 ===
In 2014, the Coordination of Azawad Movements an coalition of various groups, in 2021 the CAM established the Strategic Framework for the Defense of the People of Azawad an alliance. Both had member groups which controlled territory like the MNLA, in other cases CSP members shared control over areas. The town of Léré was captured by the Coordination of Azawad Movements in September 2023 following the departure of a United Nations peacekeeping mission from the country.

From 26 November until 30 November 2024 there were talks that the members of the Strategic Framework for the Defense of the People of Azawad unite in one single organization, this happened on 30 November and the Imghad Tuareg Self-Defense Group and Allies (al-Mahmoud faction), rebel fringes of the Arab Movement of Azawad and the coalition Coordination of Azawad Movements and two if it's member organizations (National Movement for the Liberation of Azawad and High Council for the Unity of Azawad) became the Azawad Liberation Front.

== Territorial control ==
Aguelhok and Tessalit were captured. Between the end of 25 April and the beginning of 26 April 2026, the Azawad Liberation Front captured Kidal, during the 2026 Mali offensives. Another town which was captured is Ber which is administrated by both the FLA and JNIM. On 1 May 2026, the FLA and JNIM took control of the Amachach base outside of Tessalit in the Kidal Region, near the Algerian border, after Malian and Russian troops withdrew southward.

== Administration ==
To assure an alliance with Jama'at Nusrat al-Islam wal-Muslimin (JNIM), the FLA agreed to enforce Sharia law (albeit a softer version of it) in areas under their control.

== See also ==
- Territory of Jama'at Nusrat al-Islam wal-Muslimin
- Territory of the Islamic State – West Africa Province
- Islamic Wilayat of Somalia
