= Parachute Regiment =

A Parachute regiment is an airborne infantry military unit of paratroopers, trained in parachuting into a combat zone.

Parachute Regiment may refer to:

- Parachute Regiment (United Kingdom), an elite airborne infantry regiment of the British Army
- Parachute Regiment (India), the airborne infantry regiment of the Indian Army
- Paratroopers Brigade, a unit of the Israel Defense Forces
- 44 Parachute Regiment (South Africa), the South African Army's chief airborne infantry unit
- 1st Airborne Brigade (Japan), a unit of the Japan Ground Self-Defense Force, also known as the Narashino Airborne Brigade
- Brigada de Fusileros Paracaidistas, a unit of the Mexican Air Force
- 501st Infantry Regiment (United States), a unit of the 101st Airborne Division of the United States Army,
- 504th Infantry Regiment (United States), a unit of the 82nd Airborne Division of the United States Army,
- 509th Infantry Regiment (United States), a unit of the United States Army
- 517th Parachute Regimental Combat Team, a unit of the United States Army
- Any of the divisions of the Fallschirmjäger, a branch of the Luftwaffe of Nazi Germany before and during World War II
