= Loi Tai Leng =

Loi Tai Leng လွႆတႆးလႅင်း
- Location in Myanmar (Burma)
- Coordinates: 19°44′25″N 98°12′25″E
- Country: Myanmar
- Division: Shan State
- District: Loilen District
- Township: Mong Pan Township

Population
  - Ethnicities: Shan
- Time zone: UTC+07:00 (ICT)

Loi Tai Leng (Shan: လွႆတႆးလႅင်း; Burmese: လွယ်တိုင်းလျှံ; Thai: ดอยไตแลง) is a town located in the mountainous region of southern Shan State, Myanmar (Burma). Its southern boundary is the Myanmar–Thailand border.

The headquarters of the RCSS/SSA-S are located in Loi Tai Leng. The town's name is derived from the Shan words "Loi", meaning mountain; "Tai", meaning the Shan people; and "Leng", meaning light. The town's entire name can therefore be interpreted as "the mountain where the Tai shine" or "where the Shan people see the light [to fight for their freedom]". To avoid confusion with Thais across the border, residents use Thailand's time zone instead of Myanmar Standard Time (MMT) which is thirty minutes behind, and the Thai baht over the Burmese kyat.
