= Parallel state =

Organizations that function like the government

The "parallel state" is a term coined by American historian Robert Paxton to describe a collection of organizations or institutions that are state-like in their organization, management and structure, but are not officially part of the legitimate state or government. They serve primarily to promote the prevailing political and social ideology of the state.

The parallel state differs from the more commonly used "state within a state" in that they are usually endorsed by the prevailing political elite of a country, while the "state within a state" is a pejorative term to describe state-like institutions that operate without the consent of and even to the detriment to the authority of an established state (such as churches and religious institutions or secret societies with their own laws and court systems).

Parallel states are common in totalitarian societies, such as Nazi Germany, Fascist Italy, and the Soviet Union. Organizations usually associated with the idea of a Parallel state include political parties, unions, intelligence agencies, and militaries.

== 'Parallel States' academic studies ==
"Parallel States" is also a study into the possibility of uniting one country while giving them two states parallel to each other in power and representation; both those states would however be compliant to one central-authority. This study was also suggested as a corner-stone for possible peace scenarios in war torn countries. One such example is the "Parallel States Project", hosted at Lund University, which seeks to explore the potential for a "Parallel States" approach to proposing a solution to the Israeli-Palestinian issue.

== Examples ==
=== Turkey ===
Turkish President Recep Tayyip Erdoğan has used the term "parallel state" (or "parallel structure") to describe followers of Fethullah Gülen who occupy senior bureaucratic and judicial positions, which have been accused of attempting to bring down Erdoğan's government. This is in contrast to the meaning of the term initially coined by Paxton, and instead resembles the term "state within a state." Gülen's Cemaat movement, which has a large presence within Turkey, has allegedly been involved in limiting the power of the Turkish Armed Forces through the Ergenekon trials and the Sledgehammer case while allied with Erdoğan. Following the 2013–14 protests against Erdoğan's government, the Cemaat Movement turned against Erdoğan, who thereupon labelled them as a "parallel state." Erdoğan has blamed Gülen's followers on orchestrating the 2013 government corruption scandal, as well as the 2016 coup attempt.

=== Manipur ===
The Meitei ethno-nationalist armed militia Arambai Tenggol "virtually ran a parallel government" in Manipur, India during the 2023-2025 Manipur violence.

== See also ==
- Dual power
- Dual state (model)
- Government-in-exile
- Rival government
- Parallel society
- State within a state
