= Quasi-state =

Political entity

Maximum extent of the territory of the Islamic State (frequently described as a quasi-state) in Iraq and Syria, on 21 May 2015

A quasi-state (sometimes referred to as a state-like entity or formatively a proto-state) is a political entity that does not represent a fully autonomous sovereign state, with its own institutions.

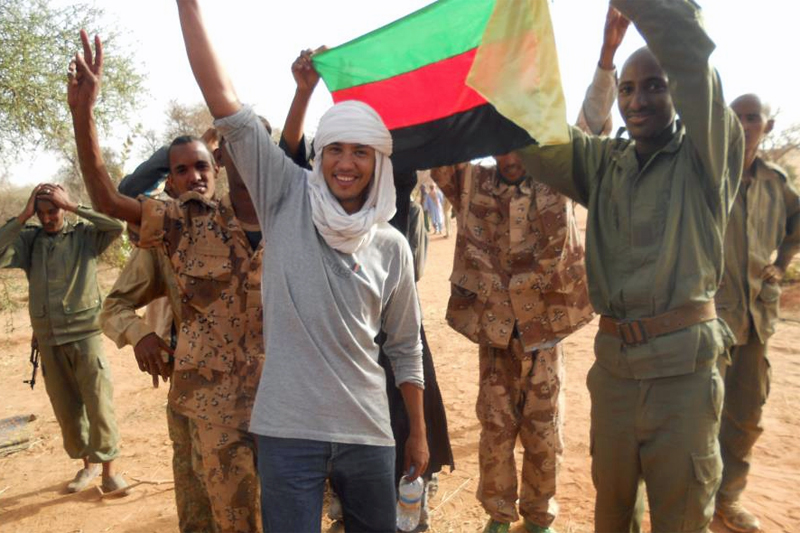
Tuareg rebels in the short-lived quasi-state of Azawad

The precise definition of quasi-state in political literature fluctuates depending on the context in which it is used. It has been used by some modern scholars to describe the self-governing British colonies and dependencies that exercised a form of home rule but remained crucial parts of the British Empire and subject firstly to the metropole's administration. Similarly, the Republics of the Soviet Union, which represented administrative units with their own respective national distinctions, have also been described as quasi-states.

In the 21st century usage, the term quasi-state has most often been evoked in reference to militant secessionist groups who claim, and exercise some form of territorial control over, a specific region, but which lack institutional cohesion. Such quasi-states include the Republika Srpska and Herzeg-Bosnia during the Bosnian War, the Republic of Serbian Krajina during the Croatian War of Independence, and Azawad during the 2012 Tuareg rebellion. The Islamic State is also widely held to be an example of a modern quasi-state.

== History ==
The term "proto-state" has been used in reference to contexts as far back as Ancient Greece, to refer to the phenomenon that the formation of a large and cohesive nation would often be preceded by very small and loose forms of statehood. For instance, historical sociologist Garry Runciman describes the evolution of social organisation in the Greek Dark Ages from statelessness, to what he calls semistates based on patriarchal domination but lacking inherent potential to achieve the requirements for statehood, sometimes transitioning into protostates with governmental roles able to maintain themselves generationally, which could evolve into larger, more centralised entities fulfilling the requirements of statehood by 700 BC in the archaic period. The term "quasi-state" is now used in a similar context.

Most ancient quasi-states were the product of tribal societies, consisting of relatively short-lived confederations of communities that united under a single warlord or chieftain endowed with symbolic authority and military rank. These were not considered sovereign states since they rarely achieved any degree of institutional permanence and authority was often exercised over a mobile people rather than measurable territory. Loose confederacies of this nature were the primary means of embracing a common statehood by people in many regions, such as the Central Asian steppes, throughout ancient history.

Quasi-states proliferated in Western Europe during the Middle Ages, likely as a result of a trend towards political decentralisation following the collapse of the Western Roman Empire and the adoption of feudalism. While theoretically owing allegiance to a single monarch under the feudal system, many lesser nobles administered their own fiefs as miniature "states within states" that were independent of each other. This practice was especially notable with regards to large, decentralised political entities such as the Holy Roman Empire, that incorporated many autonomous and semi-autonomous quasi-states.

Following the Age of Discovery, the emergence of European colonialism resulted in the formation of colonial quasi-states in Asia, Africa, and the Americas. A few colonies were given the unique status of protectorates, which were effectively controlled by the metropole but retained limited ability to administer themselves, self-governing colonies, dominions, and dependencies. These were distinct administrative units that each fulfilled many of the functions of a state without actually exercising full sovereignty or independence. Colonies without a sub-national home rule status, on the other hand, were considered administrative extensions of the colonising power rather than true quasi-states. Colonial quasi-states later served as the basis for a number of modern nation states, particularly on the Asian and African continents.

During the twentieth century, some quasi-states existed as not only distinct administrative units, but their own theoretically self-governing republics joined to each other in a political union such as the socialist federal systems observed in Yugoslavia, Czechoslovakia, and the Soviet Union.

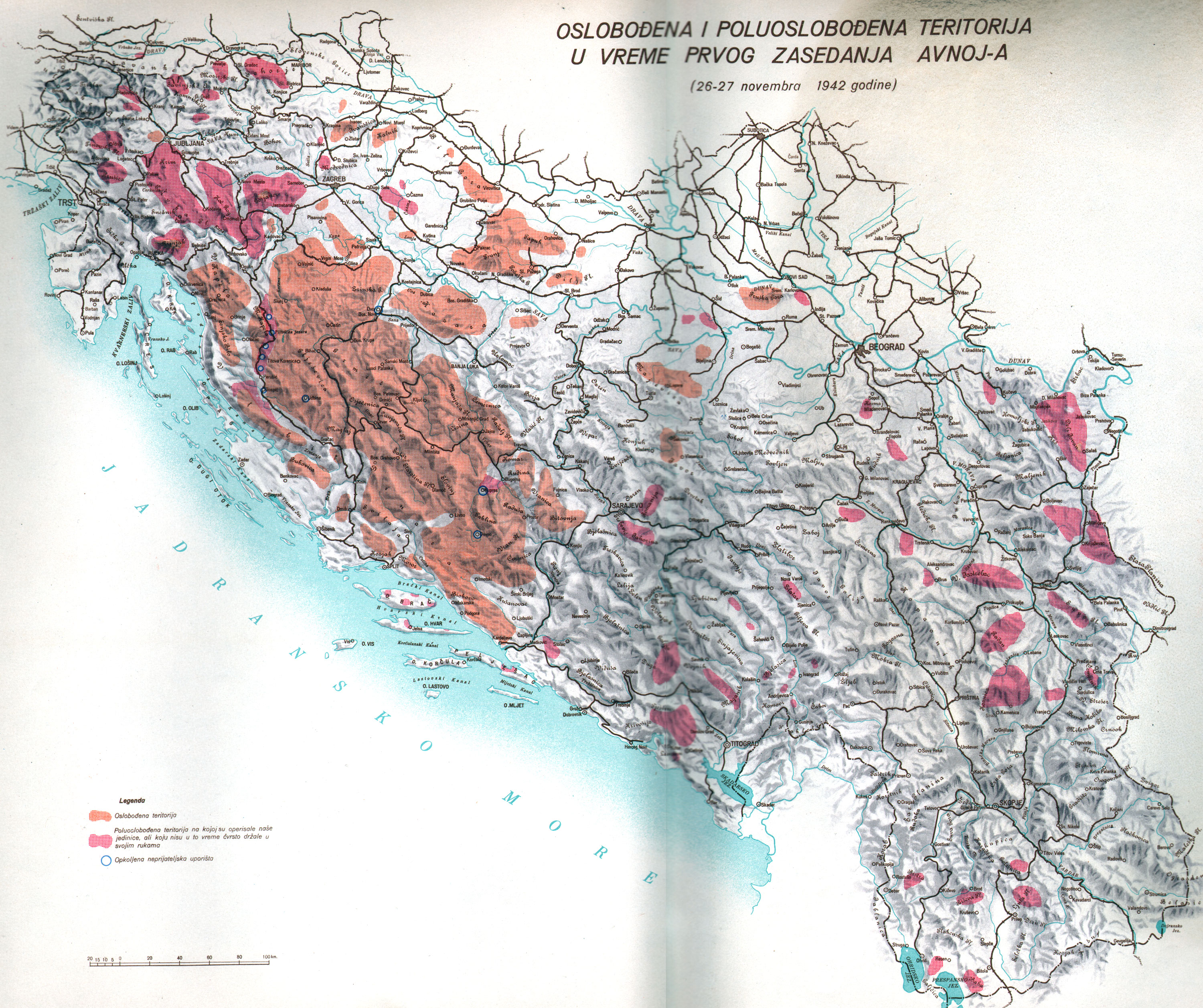
Territory controlled by the Anti-Fascist Council of Yugoslavia, which established its own quasi-state in 1942

Another form of quasi-state that has become especially common since the end of World War II is established through the unconstitutional seizure of territory by an insurgent or militant group that proceeds to assume the role of a de facto government. Although denied recognition and bereft of civil institutions, insurgent quasi-states may engage in external trade, provide social services, and even undertake limited diplomatic activity. These quasi-states are usually formed by movements drawn from geographically concentrated ethnic or religious minorities, and are thus a common feature of inter-ethnic civil conflicts. This is often due to the inclinations of an internal cultural identity group seeking to reject the legitimacy of a sovereign state's political order, and create its own enclave where it is free to live under its own sphere of laws, social mores, and ordering. Since the 1980s a special kind of insurgent statehood has emerged in form of the "Jihadi proto-state", as the Islamist concept of statehood is extremely flexible. For instance, a Jihadi emirate can be simply understood as a territory or group ruled by an emir; accordingly, it might rule a significant area or just a neighborhood. Regardless of its extent, the assumption of statehood provides Jihadi militants with important internal legitimacy and cements their self-identification as frontline society opposed to certain enemies.

The accumulation of territory by an insurgent force to form a sub-national geopolitical system and eventually, a quasi-state, was a calculated process in China during the Chinese Civil War that set a precedent for many similar attempts throughout the twentieth and twenty-first centuries. Quasi-states established as a result of civil conflict typically exist in a perpetual state of warfare and their wealth and populations may be limited accordingly. One of the most prominent examples of a wartime quasi-state in the twenty-first century is the Islamic State of Iraq and the Levant, that maintained its own administrative bureaucracy and imposed taxes.

== Theoretical basis ==
The definition of a proto-state is not concise, and has been confused by the interchangeable use of the terms state, country, and nation to describe a given territory. The term proto-state is preferred to "proto-nation" in an academic context, however, since some authorities also use nation to denote a social, ethnic, or cultural group capable of forming its own state.

A quasi-state does not meet the four essential criteria for statehood as elaborated upon in the declarative theory of statehood of the 1933 Montevideo Convention: a permanent population, a defined territory, a government with its own institutions, and the capacity to enter into relations with other states. A quasi-state is not necessarily synonymous with a state with limited recognition that otherwise has all the hallmarks of a fully functioning sovereign state, such as Rhodesia or the Republic of China, also known as Taiwan. However, quasi-states frequently go unrecognised since a state actor that recognises a quasi-state does so in violation of another state actor's external sovereignty. If full diplomatic recognition is extended to a quasi-state and embassies exchanged, it is defined as a sovereign state in its own right and may no longer be classified as a quasi-state.

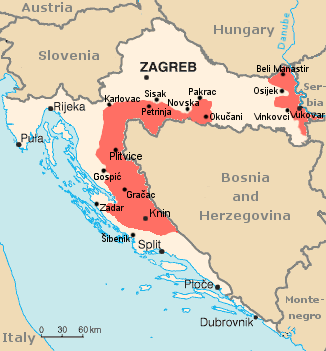
Territory of Croatia controlled by the Republic of Serbian Krajina quasi-state 1991–1995

Throughout modern history, partially autonomous regions of larger recognised states, especially those based on a historical precedent or ethnic and cultural distinctiveness that places them apart from those who dominate the state as a whole, have been considered quasi-states. Home rule generates a sub-national institutional structure that may justifiably be defined as a quasi-state. When a rebellion or insurrection seizes control and begins to establish some semblance of administration in regions within national territories under its effective rule, it has also metamorphosed into a quasi-state. These wartime quasi-states, sometimes known as insurgent states, may eventually transform the structure of a state altogether, or demarcate their own autonomous political spaces. While not a new phenomenon, the modern formation of a quasi-states in territory held by a militant non-state entity was popularised by Mao Zedong during the Chinese Civil War, and the national liberation movements worldwide that adopted his military philosophies. The rise of an insurgent quasi-state was sometimes also an indirect consequence of a movement adopting Che Guevara's foco theory of guerrilla warfare.

Secessionist quasi-states are likeliest to form in preexisting states that lack secure boundaries, a concise and well-defined body of citizens, or a single sovereign power with a monopoly on the legitimate use of military force. They may be created as a result of putsches, insurrections, separatist political campaigns, foreign intervention, sectarian violence, civil war, and even the bloodless dissolution or division of the state.

Quasi-states can be important regional players, as their existence affects the options available to state actors, either as potential allies or as impediments to their political or economic policy articulations.

== List of quasi-states ==
=== Constituent quasi-states ===
==== Current ====
Quasi-state	Parent state	Achieved statehood (Note: Column meaning: * Did the quasi-state achieve full statehood? For any period that overlaps with the existence of the United Nations, this means full UN membership (viz. UN Charter Art 4). For earlier periods, this means widely recognized statehood. * "De facto" indicates an autonomous state without UN membership or, before the UN, without full sovereignty or recognition. * "Constituent" means that the quasi-state became a constituent state of its parent state, listed in the preceding column.)	Since	Ref.
Adygea	Russia	Constituent	1991	
Åland	Finland	No	1921	
Altai Republic	Russia	Constituent	1992	
Aruba	Netherlands	No	1986	
Ashanti	Ghana	No	1957	
Azad Kashmir	Pakistan	No	1975	
Azawad	Mali	No	1975	
Azores	Portugal	No	1816	
Bashkortostan	Russia	Constituent	1990	
Basque Country	Spain	No	1978	
British Virgin Islands	United Kingdom	No	1960	
Bougainville	Papua New Guinea	De facto	2001	
Buryatia	Russia	Constituent	1990	
Canary Islands	Spain	No	1816	
Catalonia	Spain	No	1978	
Cayman Islands	United Kingdom	No	1962	
Chin State	Myanmar	No	1948	
Christmas Island	Australia	No	1958	
Chuvashia	Russia	Constituent	1992	
Cook Islands	New Zealand	De jure	1888	
Corsica	France	No	1978	
Curaçao	Netherlands	No	2010	
Dagestan	Russia	Constituent	1991	
Darfur	Sudan	Constituent		
Easter Island	Chile	No	1944	
Falkland Islands	United Kingdom	No	1833	
Faroe Islands	Denmark	No	1948	
Flanders	Belgium	No	1970	
French Polynesia	France	No	1847	
Galicia	Spain	No	1978	
Greenland	Denmark	No	1816	
Guam	United States	No	1816	
Guernsey	United Kingdom	No	1204	
Indian reservations	United States	De jure	1658	
Ingushetia	Russia	Constituent	1992	
Iraqi Kurdistan	Iraq	No	1991	
Isle of Man	United Kingdom	De jure	1828	
Jersey	United Kingdom	De jure	1204	
Jewish Autonomous Oblast	Russia	Constituent	1934	
Jubaland	Somalia	No	2001	(Note: Jubaland declared itself independent of Somalia in 1998. It technically rejoined Somalia in 2001 when its ruling Juba Valley Alliance became part of the country's Transitional Federal Government. However, Jubaland has continued to persist as a more or less autonomous state.)
Kabardino-Balkaria	Russia	Constituent	1992	
Kachin State	Myanmar	No	1948	
Kalmykia	Russia	Constituent	1992	
Karachay-Cherkessia	Russia	Constituent	1992	
Karelia	Russia	Constituent	1991	
Kayah State	Myanmar	No	1959	
Kayin State	Myanmar	No	1951	
Khakassia	Russia	Constituent	1992	
Komi Republic	Russia	Constituent	1996	
Madeira	Portugal	No	1816	
Mari El	Russia	Constituent	1990	
Marquesas Islands	France	No	1844	
Montserrat	United Kingdom	No	1632	
Mon State	Myanmar	No	1974	
Mordovia	Russia	Constituent	1994	
New Caledonia	France	No	1853	
Northern Marianas	United States	No	1899	
North Ossetia-Alania	Russia	Constituent	1995	
Nunavut	Canada	No	1999	
Palaung Self-Administered Zone	Myanmar	No	2008	
Pa-O Self-Administered Zone	Myanmar	No	2008	
Puerto Rico	United States	No	1816	
Puntland	Somalia	De facto	1998	
Quebec	Canada	No	1816	
Rakhine State	Myanmar	No	1974	
Sakha Republic	Russia	Constituent	1991	
Scotland	United Kingdom	No	1999	
Shan State	Myanmar	No	1959	
Sint Maarten	Netherlands	No	2010	
South Tyrol	Italy	No	1926	
Svalbard	Norway	No	1992	
Tatarstan	Russia	Constituent	1990	
Temotu	Solomon Islands	No	1981	
Terra Indígena (Brazil)	Brazil	No	1850	
Turks and Caicos	United Kingdom	No	1973	
Tuva	Russia	Constituent	1992	
Udmurtia	Russia	Constituent	1990	
United States Virgin Islands	United States	No	1816	
Wales	United Kingdom	No	1999	
Wallonia	Belgium	No	1970	
Wa State	Myanmar	De facto	1989	
Zanzibar	Tanzania	No	1964	

==== Former ====
Quasi-state	Parent state	Achieved statehood	Dates	Ref.
Adjara	Georgia	No	1921–2004	
Aruba	Netherlands	No	1986–1995	
Bophuthatswana	South Africa	De jure	1977–1994	
Bosnia-Herzegovina	Yugoslavia	Yes	1943–1992	
Ciskei	South Africa	De jure	1981–1994	
Croatia	Yugoslavia	Yes	1943–1991	
Czech Socialist Republic	Czechoslovakia	Yes	1969–1993	
East Caprivi	South Africa	No	1972–1989	
(Basque Country (autonomous community)) Euzkadi	Second Spanish Republic	No	1936–1937	
Gagauzia	Moldova	No	1991–1994	
Gazankulu	South Africa	No	1971–1994	
Hereroland	South Africa	No	1970–1989	
Jammu and Kashmir	India	No	1921–2019	
KaNgwane	South Africa	No	1972–1994	
Kavangoland	South Africa	No	1973–1989	
KwaNdebele	South Africa	No	1981–1994	
KwaZulu	South Africa	No	1981–1994	
Lebowa	South Africa	No	1972–1994	
Macedonia	Yugoslavia	Yes	1945–1991	
Montenegro	Yugoslavia; Serbia and Montenegro	Yes	1945–2006	
Ovamboland	South Africa	No	1973–1989	
QwaQwa	South Africa	No	1974–1994	
Russian SFSR	Soviet Union	Yes	1917–1991	
Serbia	Yugoslavia; Serbia and Montenegro	Yes	1945–2006	
Singapore	Malaysia	Yes	1963–1965	
Slovak Socialist Republic	Czechoslovakia	Yes	1969–1993	
Slovenia	Yugoslavia	Yes	1945–1991	
(South Africa) South West Africa (Namibia)	South Africa	Yes	1915–1990	
(South Sudan) Southern Sudan	Sudan	Yes	2005–2011	
Transkei	South Africa	De jure	1976–1994	
Trucial States	United Kingdom	Yes	1820–1971	
Turkestan ASSR	Russian SFSR	No	1918–1924	
Ukrainian SSR	Russian SFSR; Soviet Union	Yes	1919–1991	
Venda	South Africa	De jure	1979–1994	

=== Secessionist, insurgent, and self-proclaimed autonomous quasi-states ===
==== Current ====
Quasi-state	Parent state	Achieved statehood	Since	Ref.
Islamic Wilayat of Somalia (Al-Shabaab)	Somalia	De facto	2009	
Allied Democratic Forces	Democratic Republic of the Congo; Uganda	No	1996	
Ansar al-Sharia (Yemen)	Yemen	No	2011	
Arakan People's Revolutionary Government	Myanmar	De facto	2019	
Chinland	Myanmar	De facto	2023	
Islamic State	Somalia; Nigeria; Chad; Cameroon; Democratic Republic of the Congo; Niger; Burkina Faso; Mali; Mozambique	De facto	2013	
(Islamic State) Daular Musulunci (Boko Haram)	Nigeria; Niger; Chad	De facto	2014	
Territory of Jama'at Nusrat al-Islam wal-Muslimin	Mali; Burkina Faso; Niger; Benin; Togo	De facto	2017	
(Sudan) Government of Peace and Unity	Sudan	De facto	2025	
Liberated Areas	Sudan	De facto	2021	
(Haiti) Territory of Viv Ansanm	Haiti	No	2024	
People's Government of Kokang	Myanmar	De facto	2011	

==== Former ====
Quasi-state	Parent state	Achieved statehood	Dates	Ref.
Al-Nusra Front	Syria	No	2012–2017	
Ansar al-Islam	Iraq	No	2001–2003	
Islamic Emirate of Kurdistan	Kurdistan	De facto	1994–2003	
Ansar al-Sharia (Libya)	Libya	No	2014–2017	
Ansar Dine	Mali	No	2012–2013	
Donetsk People's Republic	Ukraine	De facto	2014–2022	
Luhansk People's Republic	Ukraine	De facto	2014–2022	
Armed Forces of South Russia	Russia	No	1919–1920	
Azawad	Mali	De facto	2012–2013	
Chechen Republic of Ichkeria	Russia	De facto	1991–2000	
Chinese Soviet Republic	(Taiwan) Republic of China	No	1931–1937	
Communist China	(Taiwan) Republic of China	Yes	1927–1949	
Dar al-Kuti	Central African Republic	De facto	2015–2021	
Democratic Autonomous Administration of North and East Syria	Syria	No	2012-2026	
Dubrovnik Republic	Croatia	No	1991–1992	
Eastern Slavonia, Baranja and Western Syrmia	Croatia	No	1995–1998	
FARC	Colombia	No	1964–2017	
Fatah al-Islam	Lebanon	No	2007	
Armed Islamic Group of Algeria	Algeria	No	1993–1995	
(Croatian Republic of Herzeg-Bosnia) Herzeg-Bosnia	Republic of Bosnia and Herzegovina	No	1991–1996	
Hyderabad State	Dominion of India	De facto	1947–1948	
Idel-Ural State	Russia	No	1917–1918	
(Republic of Ireland) Irish Republic	United Kingdom	De facto (Note: The Irish Republic claimed the entire island of Ireland, but only controlled 21 of its 32 counties.)	1916; 1919–1922	
Islamic Emirate of Kunar	Republic of Afghanistan	De facto	1989–1991	
Emirate of Imbaba	Egypt	No	1989–1992	
Jamiat-e Islami	Democratic Republic of Afghanistan	No	1982–1989	
Republic of Kosova	Yugoslavia	No	1992–1999	
Kharkiv People's Republic	Ukraine	No	2014	
Jiangxi	Republic of China	No	1931–1937	
Jubaland	Somalia	No	1998–2001	
Territory of Junbish-e Milli	Republic of Afghanistan (until April 28); Islamic State of Afghanistan (from April 28)	No	1992–1997, 1997–1998, 2001–2007	
Liberated Yugoslavia	Independent State of Croatia; Occupied Serbia	Yes	1942–1945	
Mozambique	Portugal	Yes	1964–1974	(Note: The erosion of Portuguese military control over northern Mozambique during the Mozambican War of Independence allowed local guerrillas to establish a quasi-state there, which survived until the war ended in 1974. Home to about a million people, the miniature insurgent quasi-state was managed by FRELIMO's civilian wing and was able to provide administrative services, open trade relations with Tanzania, and even supervise the construction of its own schools and hospitals with foreign aid.)
Khatumo State	Somalia	No	2012–2025	
Southern Transitional Council	Yemen	De facto	2020–2026	
Revolutionary Vietnam	South Vietnam	No	1969–1976	
Republika Srpska	Republic of Bosnia and Herzegovina	No	1991–1995	
Red Spears' rebel area in Dengzhou	Republic of China	No	1929	
Serbian Krajina	Croatia	No	1991–1995	
Sudetenland	Czechoslovakia	No	1918–1938	
Greater Liberia	Liberia	No	1989–1997	(Note: In course of the First Liberian Civil War, the Liberian central government effectively collapsed, allowing warlords to establish their own fiefs. One of the most powerful rebel leaders in Liberia, Charles Taylor, set up his own domain in a way resembling an actual state: He reorganised his militia into a military-like organisation (split into Army, Marines, Navy, and Executive Mansion Guard), established his de facto capital at Gbarnga, and created a civilian government and justice system under his control that were supposed to enforce law and order. The area under his control was commonly called "Taylorland" or "Greater Liberia" and even became somewhat stable and peaceful until it largely disintegrated in 1994/5 as result of attacks by rival militias. In the end, however, Taylor won the civil war and was elected President of Liberia, with his regime becoming the new central government.)
Tamil Eelam	Sri Lanka	No	1984–2009	
Tibet	Republic of China	De facto	1912–1951	(Note: Shakya 1999, p. 4 "independent state", Shakya 1999, p. 90 "international legal status" was "independent state". Feigon 1996, p. 119 "border between the two countries" of China and Tibet in 1917. Goldstein 1997, pp. 30–37, Chapter titled "Interlude: De Facto Independence"; Latourette 1964, p. 333 "practically independent" from 1912, 419 "accepted the suzerainty of the Communists" in 1951.)
Western Bosnia	Republic of Bosnia and Herzegovina	No	1993–1995	
Zaporozhian Sich	Polish–Lithuanian Commonwealth	Yes	16th century–1649	
Territory of the Rapid Support Forces	Sudan	De facto	2023–2025	

== See also ==
=== Types of states ===
- Aspirant state
- Deep state
- Failed state
- Parallel state
- Rump state
- Sovereign state

=== Other ===
- Rival government
- Warlord
- List of sovereign states
- List of states with limited recognition
- List of rebel groups that control territory
- Nation-building
- State-building
- Unrepresented Nations and Peoples Organization

== Notes and references ==
=== Bibliography ===
- Bianco, Lucien (2015). Peasants without the Party: Grassroots Movements in Twentieth Century China. Abingdon-on-Thames, New York City: Routledge. ISBN 978-1563248405.
- Dwyer, Johnny (2015). American Warlord. A true story. New York City: Vintage Books.
- Essen, Michael Fredholm von (2018). Muscovy's Soldiers. The Emergence of the Russian Army 1462–1689. Warwick: Helion & Company. ISBN 978-1912390106.
- Feigon, Lee (1996). Demystifying Tibet: Unlocking the Secrets of the Land of the Snows. I.R. Dee. ISBN 978-1-56663-089-4.
- Goldstein, Melvyn C. (1997), The Snow Lion and the Dragon: China, Tibet, and the Dalai Lama, University of California Press, ISBN 978-0-520-21951-9, ISBN 0-520-21254-1
- Latourette, Kenneth Scott (1964), The Chinese, Their History and Culture (Fourth ed.), New York: Macmillan Company, Library of Congress catalog card number 64-17372 – via archive.org
- Lia, Brynjar (August 2015). "Understanding Jihadi Proto-States" (PDF). Perspectives on Terrorism. 9 (4): 31–41. ISSN 2334-3745. Archived from the original (PDF) on 2023-12-07.
- Lidow, Nicholai Hart (2016). Violent Order: Understanding Rebel Governance through Liberia's Civil War. Cambridge: Cambridge University Press.
- Shakya, Tsering (1999), The Dragon in the Land of Snows: A History of Modern Tibet Since 1947, Pimlico, ISBN 978-0-7126-6533-9, ISBN 0-231-11814-7
