= Territory of Jama'at Nusrat al-Islam wal-Muslimin =

Quasi-state in the Sahel region

Jama'at Nusrat al-Islam wal-Muslimin جماعة نصرة الإسلام والمسلمين
- Flag (Note: Other flags used: )
- Motto: لَا إِلَٰهَ إِلَّا ٱللَّٰهُ، مُحَمَّدٌ رَسُولُ ٱللَّٰهِ lā ʾilāha ʾillā -llāh, muḥammadun rasūlu llāh "There is no deity but God, Muhammad is the messenger of God."
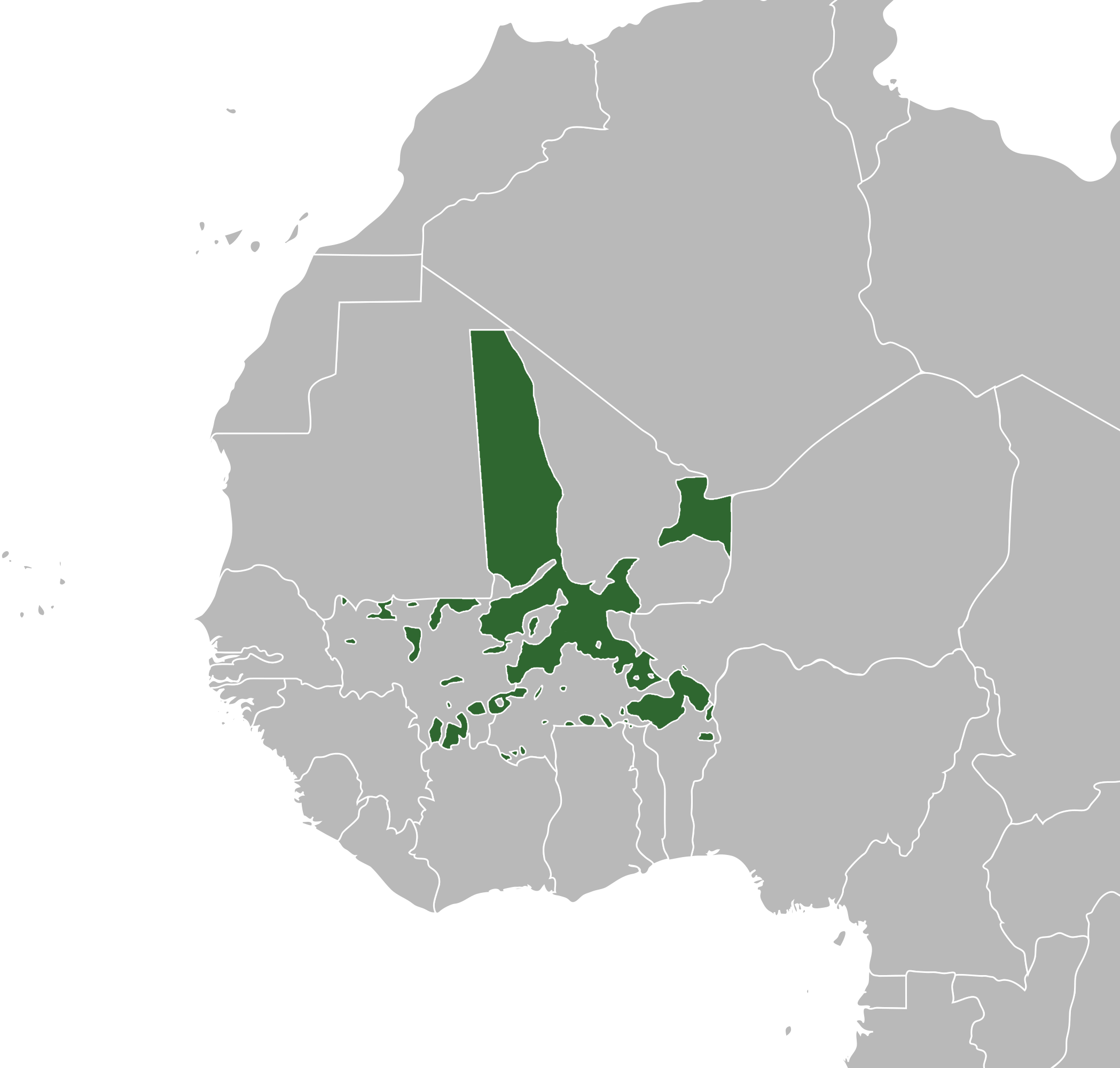
- Territory under the control of JNIM
- Status: Unrecognized decentralized proto-state and rival government
- Capital: Unknown (2017–2019); Tinzaouaten (in 2019); Unknown (2019–present)
- Religion: Sunni Islam (Salafism)
- Government: Emirate
- Emir
  - Since 2017: Iyad Ag Ghali
- Establishment: Sahel War
  - Formation of JNIM: 2 March 2017
Preceded by
Territory of Ansar Dine

The Al-Qaeda-affiliated Jama'at Nusrat al-Islam wal-Muslimin (JNIM) is a group formed in 2017 by the merger of several jihadist organizations in West Africa. It operates mainly in Mali, as well as parts of Burkina Faso, Niger, Benin and Togo, where it maintains a decentralized proto-state. The group enforces strict Sharia in areas it controls, and raises money through methods such as taxation, kidnapping for ransom, and smuggling.

== Background ==
Before the founding of the JNIM, two predecessor organizations Ansar Dine and the Movement for Oneness and Jihad in West Africa, claimed that they controlled all the cities in the northern regions of Mali, besides that the MLNA held Menaka for some months.

JNIM was formed as a united front of four salafi jihadist groups operating in West Africa that were all supportive of Al-Qaeda. The groups that made up the merger were Ansar Dine, al-Mourabitoun, Katiba Macina, and Al-Qaeda in the Islamic Maghreb. Later in 2017, Ansarul Islam joined Jama'at Nusrat al-Islam wal-Muslimin, however it still exists as an autonomous organization.

In the early 2020s, JNIM was the fastest-growing designated terrorist organization in the world. As of 2025, it is considered the most heavily armed militant organization in the Sahel and one of the most powerful globally.

== Territorial control ==
The group operates a decentralized proto-state model in areas under its control. Its influence is presently expanding southward into coastal West African countries, including Northern Benin and Northern Togo. On 23 May 2025, an attack by JNIM militants occurred in Dioura, where they temporarily took control of the nearby military base. During the attack, 41 soldiers died. On 1 June 2025, JNIM militants attacked and took control of a Malian army base in Boulkessi. Around 30 Malian soldiers died before they retreated. On 11 November 2025, JNIM attacked and overran Loulouni, temporarily taking control. At least ten Dozo militiamen were killed in the attack, and hundreds fled the town, which was recaptured by government forces three days later. The JNIM was sometimes allied with the Strategic Framework for the Defense of the People of Azawad, which held territory. During the 2026 Mali offensives, JNIM and the Azawad Liberation Front claimed partial or full control over Mopti, Sevare, Gao.

== Government ==
JNIM presents itself as an alternative to the Malian government. JNIM imposes strict Sharia, enforces dress codes, banned music, banned smoking, and restricts women’s movement. Funding methods of JNIM include: ransoming captives, taxing locals, smuggling weapons, extortion and drug trafficking. However, it is reported that these policies are unpopular among the locals. Iyad Ag Ghali, the co-founder of Jama'at Nusrat al-Islam wal-Muslimin, became its emir in 2017 and still serves in the position.

=== Communications ===
JNIM utilizes the Starlink satellite internet for communications. According to a report by Le Monde, this is because it had been found to be more practical and affordable than the usage of satellite phones. The use of Starlink has enabled the organization to communicate in areas where security forces have no communications.

== See also ==
- Territory of Boko Haram
- Territory of the Islamic State
- Territory of the Islamic State – West Africa Province
- Islamic Wilayat of Somalia
- Territory of the Azawad Liberation Front
