= Shahada News Agency =

Somalia news aggregator affiliated with Al-Shabaab

- Native name: وكالة شهادة الإخبارية
- Romanized name: Wakālat shahādat al-ikhbārīyah
- Industry: News aggregator
- Founded: 2011
- Owner: Al-Shabaab
- Website: https://shahadaagencynews.com/

Shahada News Agency (Arabic: وكالة شهادة الإخبارية, romanized: Wakālat shahādat al-ikhbārīyah, Somali: Wakaalada Wararka ee Shahada) is a news agency of the militant organization Al-Shabaab and is used as the main disseminator for news in Arabic as well as English translations relating to attacks done by al-Shabaab and other operations including executions.

== History ==
Shahada News Agency traces its origins to the initial Al-Shabaab's daily news reports and translations through the Al-Qaeda affiliated Global Islamic Media Front platform, which used to publish daily reports starting from 2008. The first recorded report from Shahada News Agency was in 2012 and it rose to prominence in 2015 by releasing information on attacks and ambushes as well as news in Al-Shabaab controlled territory. The agency would upload and share what it calls "exclusive" news of Al-Shabaab through its website and social media platforms. Its format is similar to that of the Amaq News Agency run by Islamic State.

Besides Al-Shabaab's media foundation for video production, Al-Kataib, Shahada News Agency is considered one of Al-Shabaab's propaganda news units with them launching accounts on Facebook, Twitter (now X), Telegram and attempts to compete against news aggregators associated with the Islamic State in the regional area of Al-Shabaab. They also utilize the dark net and onion services to release news. Shahada News Agency expanded their news reach further after an announcement on July 9, 2024, that it would start creating accounts on Facebook, Twitter, and Telegram, and continue to work on platforms like the encrypted invite-only platform RocketChat and newly-formed Chirpwire. Through Telegram, the Shahada News Agency would create Telegram bots that would give updates on posts and news on Al-Shabaab and international relations.

In 2020, the United States through the Rewards For Justice Program officially recognized Shahada News Agency as Al-Shabaab's news network, and an alias of Al-Shabaab.
