= Jilib =

Jilib جيليب
- City
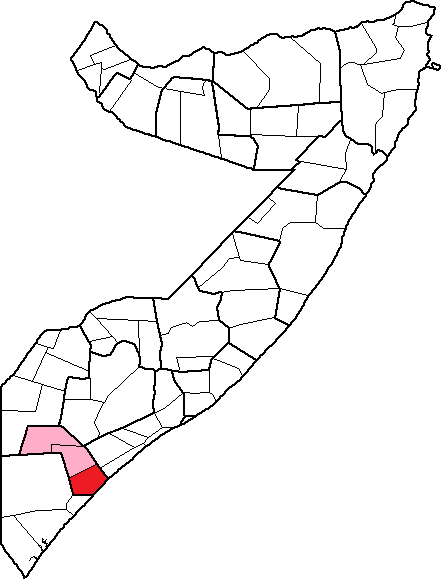
- Jilib highlighted on a map of Somalia

- Location in Somalia
- Coordinates: 00°29′39″N 42°46′28″E
- Country: Somalia (De jure) (Al-Shabaab (militant group)) Islamic Wilayat of Somalia (De facto)
- State: Jubaland
- Region: Jubbada Dhexe
- District: Jilib District

Government
  - Control: al-Shabaab

Population (2008)
  - Total: 125,000 est.
- Time zone: UTC+3 (EAT)

Jilib (Note: Arabic: جيليب) is a city in the Middle Juba region of Somalia. It currently serves as the de facto capital of the Islamic Wilayat of Somalia controlled by al-Shabaab. Jilib has an estimated population of around 100,000 inhabitants and covers an area of about 10 square kilometres. It is 112 kilometres or 70 miles north of Kismaayo.

== History ==
During the Middle Ages, Jilib and its surrounding area was part of the Ajuran Empire that governed much of southern Somalia and eastern Ethiopia, with its domain extending from Hobyo in the north, to Qelafo in the west, to Kismayo in the south.

In the early modern period, Jilib was ruled by the Shambara Sultanate. The kingdom was eventually incorporated into Italian Somaliland protectorate in 1910 after the death of the last Sultan Nasib Bunda. After independence in 1960, the city was made the center of the official Jilib District.

The Islamic Courts Union was defeated there in the Battle of Jilib (December 2006 – January 2007). The ICU recaptured the town on May 17, 2008.

The city includes Jilib National Park, the largest national park in the Middle Juba region of Somalia, at around 950 square kilometres or 370 square miles in area.

== Somali Civil War ==
Jilib is controlled by Al-Shabaab, a jihadist fundamentalist group based in East Africa with links to Al-Qaeda. It is inhabited by Sheekhaal. However, most people fled due to bad condition inside the city. The town functions as the capital of the Islamic Wilayat of Somalia.
