= Islamic Wilayaat of Somalia =

Islamic Emirate ruled by Al-Shabaab in Somalia

Islamic Wilayaat of Somalia Wilaayaatka Islaamiga Soomaaliya (Somali) وِلَايَات الصُّومَال الْإِسْلَامِيَّة (Arabic)
- Flag (Note: Al-Shabaab uses an inverted flag for its government and a black flag with white inscriptions as its war flag.) Emblem

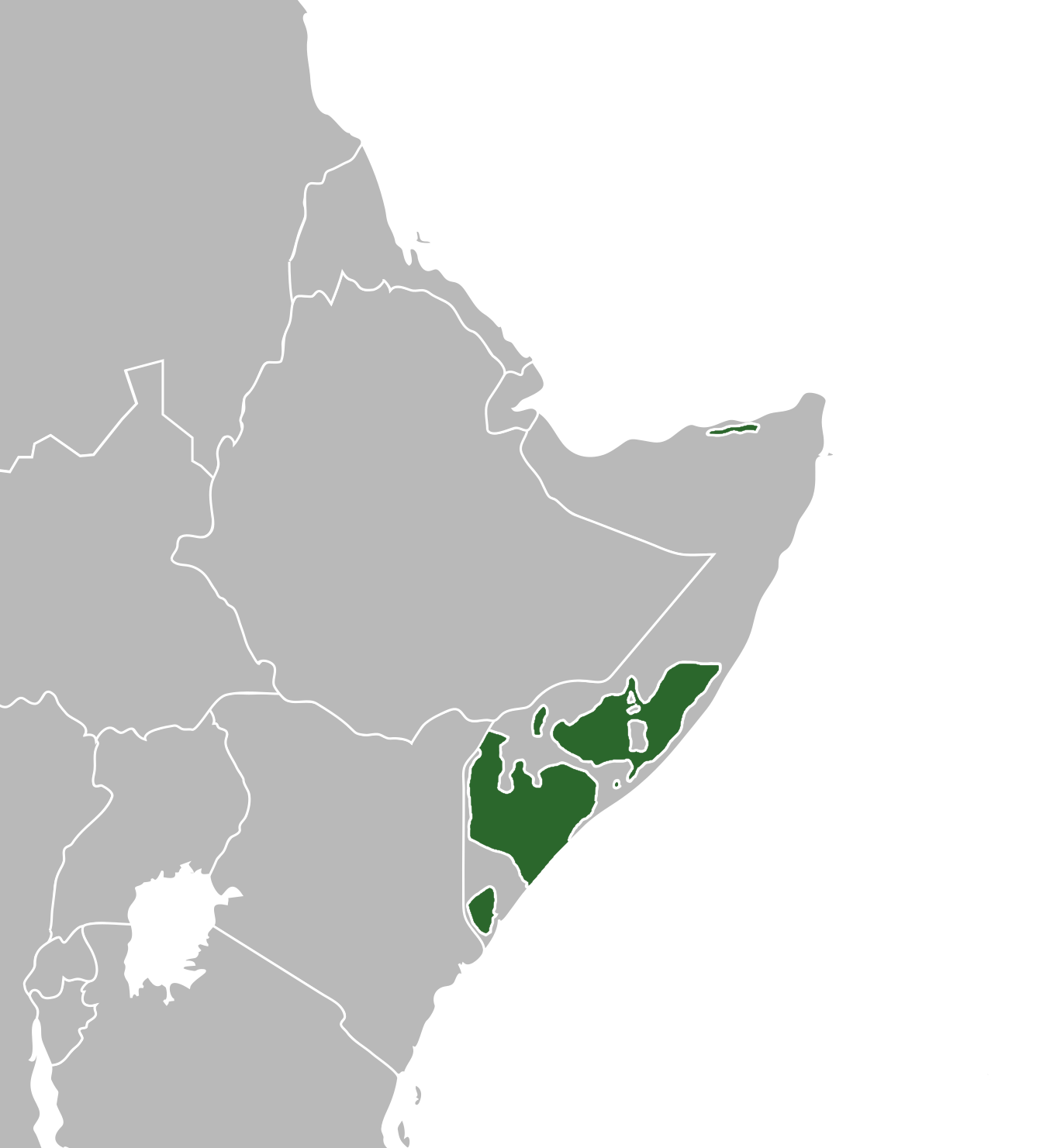
- The Islamic Wilayat of Somalia (green) as of July 2025
- Status: Quasi-state
- Capital: Jilib (since 2014) (Note: Kismayo (2008–2012) Barawe (2012–2014))
- Official languages: Somali
- Religion: Islam
- Government: Self-proclaimed Islamic state
  - Emir: Ahmed Diriye
- Establishment: Somali Civil War
- History
  - Established: 2009

Population
  - Estimate: 900,000
- Currency: Somali shilling

The Islamic Wilayaat of Somalia, also known as the Islamic Emirate of Somalia, is a quasi-state under the control and governance of Al-Shabaab. Al-Shabaab aims to control Somalia and govern the country by imposing a strict interpretation of Sharia, although its government remains unrecognized. The de facto capital has been Jilib since 2014.

== Etymology ==
Al-Shabaab has used the term "Islamic Wilayaat of Somalia" to describe areas under its control. Rather than announcing the establishment of an emirate through a formal declaration, the group developed this characterization over time as it sought to portray its areas of territorial control as being governed according to its interpretation of Islamic law and principles.

== History ==
Al-Shabaab had its origins in the Islamic Courts Union, an umbrella group which governed much of Somalia from June 2006 until the Ethiopian invasion in December 2006. In 2007–08, Al-Shabaab was established as an independent group, gaining much support after branding itself the Somali resistance against the Ethiopian occupation.

Al-Shabaab fused Somali nationalism with jihadism. It was also pan-Islamist, linking the grievances of Somalia with those of the entire Muslim world. The ideology of Al-Shabaab represented the fusion of the Salafi Jihadist trend in Somalia, which collaborated with the Takfir wal-Hijra group, with the hardline elements of Wahhabi groups in Somalia. Wahhabi group Jama'at al-I'tisam supported the setting up of early al-Shabab training camps, and its most hardcore faction merged into Al-Shabaab in late 2004.

However, some of the more nationalist factions of Al-Shabaab rejected pan-Islamism and only wanted Somalia under Islamic rule. Much of Al-Shabaab was staunchly nationalist, and aimed to expand across all of Greater Somalia. After the collapse of the Islamic Courts Union in 2007, Al-Shabaab launched its own insurgency. Although focused solely on Somalia, Al-Shabaab attracted some foreign jihadists. The vast majority of the foreign jihadists were Somali diaspora. The rest included volunteers from East Africa, the Middle East, and the West. High ranking foreign fighters included Fuad Qalaf Shongole, a Swedish Somali; Jehad Mostafa, a Kurdish American; Omar Shafik Hammami, a Syrian American; and Mujahid Miski, a Somali American.

During the Ethiopian military occupation, many Somalis saw Al-Shabaab as a genuine national resistance movement, while Al-Shabaab further capitalized on its nationalist ideology. On 13 November 2008, Al-Shabaab rapidly expanded and governed territory for the first time. The group also established networks and territorial bases concentrated in the rural south-central regions. The African Union reported Al-Shabaab was about 2,000 fighters strong during 2008.

In September 2008, Al-Shabaab announced its establishment of a government administration in Kismayo, and planned to declare the Islamic Emirate of Somalia. However, it was not declared. The group claimed that administrative positions would be divided between Al-Shabaab, surviving ICU members, and clan leaders. However, various clan elders and ICU commanders complained that they were left out of the negotiations. In January 2009, the ARS joined the TFG, with Sharif Sheikh Ahmed emerging as the new president of the TFG. Al-Shabaab began to attack the ARS for joining the TFG. The Somali government had lost almost all of the territory recovered by the TFG in 2007.

Ahmed Godane was announced the emir of Al-Shabaab in 2008. He pledged allegiance to Osama bin Laden and took a pan-Islamist approach, unlike the Somali nationalists in Al-Shabaab. After the Ethiopian withdrawal in January 2009, the public support that Al-Shabaab had previously enjoyed as a resistance faction had significantly diminished. After Al-Shabaab allied with al-Qaeda, Anwar al-Awlaki encouraged jihadists to migrate to Somalia in support of Al-Shabaab. Osama bin Laden also released a statement in support of Al-Shabaab in Somalia. Al-Shabaab significantly grew in power and size.

By 2009–10, Al-Shabaab controlled most of central and southern Somalia, and it had formed administrative structures to govern territories under its control.

During the Battle of Mogadishu, Al-Shabaab suffered heavy losses. By August 2011, Al-Shabaab withdrew from Mogadishu, although it continues to influence the city and launch attacks from nearby cities. In October and November 2011, local groups with the support of Kenya and Ethiopia launched offensives against Al-Shabaab, with Kenya approaching from the south and Ethiopia approaching from the west. Al-Shabaab lost territory to both armies, notably losing Baidoa to Ethiopia in February 2012 and losing Kismayo to Kenya in October 2012.

Under Godane, Al-Shabaab's stated goals expanded to include controlling Somalia for itself and governing the country by enforcing a strict interpretation of the Wahhabi ideology. The authoritarian style of Al-Shabaab's governance and its use of indiscriminate violence during Godane's tenure caused the group to lose support among the vast majority of Somalis. In 2013, the internal disagreements led to internecine violence as Godane purged his critics. The Pan-Islamist, pro-al-Qaeda faction of Godane clashed with more nationalist factions.

Al-Shabaab took significant damage in 2013. Following its territorial losses, Al-Shabaab reverted to asymmetric warfare and guerrilla attacks. While the group no longer had governmental and military authority over substantial territory, it retained a sporadic presence, and therefore significant influence, in many places.

In 2016, Al-Shabaab remained weakened by the military campaign against it. An American drone strike killed Godane on September 1, 2014, and he was succeeded by Ahmed Diriye. The group reverted to its Somali nationalism. Al-Shabaab won more military operations against the government. It had also expanded its operations in Puntland. The Salafi jihadist organization Islamic State – Somalia Province (IS–SP) challenged Al-Shabaab. On 20 July 2022, Al-Shabaab launched an invasion into Ethiopia with the motives of setting up a base in the Somali Region.

== Governance ==
The group is led by an executive Tanfid Council of 7-14 members. It operates several internal departments known as makhtab, including Jabhat (military), Sanaaca (explosives), Da'wa (preaching), Zakat (taxation), Islamic Wilayah (local administration), Garsoor (Islamic courts), Amniyat (intelligence agency) and Jaysh al-Hisbah (police force). The organization appoints governors (waali), of whom there are ten, who oversee all civil services in Al-Shabaab-controlled areas, including welfare and roads.

In the Islamic Wilayaat of Somalia, Al-Shabaab implemented strict Sharia, with dispute resolution through Sharia-based courts, which were sometimes seen as better than those in government-held territories. Some Somalis travelled to their territory just for its dispute resolution system. Al-Shabaab claimed some credit for Somalia's crop yield in early 2010, stating that Somali grain production had flourished due to Al-Shabaab's reduction of food imports, and that the policy had redistributed income to poor, rural Somali farmers. Its media also included Shahada News Agency and Radio al-Andalus. The group also committed human rights abuses in its territories, including through a strict interpretation and application of Islamic jurisprudence on hudud.

=== Emirs ===
- Ahmed Diriye (2014–present)
- Ahmed Godane (2008–2014)
- Aden Ayro (2006–2008)

== Flags ==
Flags used in regions governed by al-Shabaab
Main flag used in controlled territories

Variant flag
