= Al-Shabaab (militant group) =

Somalia-based Jihadist militant group

Harakat al-Shabaab al-Mujahideen
- حركة الشباب المجاهدين; Ḥarakat ash-Shabāb al-Mujāhidīn
- Flag used by Al-Shabaab (Note: Al-Shabaab uses an inverted flag for its government and a black flag with white inscriptions for war.) Emblem
- Other name: Ash-Shabaab
- Leaders: 1st Emir: Ismail Arale (2006 – 2007); 2nd Emir: Ahmed Godane † (2007 – 2014); 3rd Emir: Ahmad Diriye (since 2014); 1st Deputy Emir: Mahad Karate; 2nd Deputy Emir: Abukar Ali Adan; Former 1st Deputy Emir: Ahmed Madobe (2006 – 2007); Former 1st Deputy Emir and Spokesman: Mukhtar Robow (2008 – 2013); Former 2nd Deputy Emir: Ibrahim al-Afghani † (2008 – 2013); Spokesman: Ali Mohamed Rage; Amir of Wilayat: Mohamed Mire Jama, alias Abu Abdirahman †; Emir of Kenyan military wing: Maalim Ayman; Deputy Emir of Kenyan military wing: Malin Khaled; Military Spokesperson: Abdulaziz Abu Musab; Head of the Clan Elder Council: Ibrahim Sheikh Ali; Amniyat Emir: Yusuf Ahmed Hajji Nurow; Military Emir: Guuled Ilka'ase; Emir of Finance: Abdikarim Horseed; Senior Media Official: Abdullahi Osman
- Dates active: August 2006 – present
- Country: Somalia; Kenya; Ethiopia
- Allegiance: al-Qaeda (2012–present); Islamic Wilayaat of Somalia (since 2011)
- Groups: Ethiopian Front; Jaysh Ayman
- Headquarters: Jilib (2014–present); Former headquarters; Mogadishu (2006–2010); Kismayo (2008–2012); Barawe (2012–2014)
- Ideology: Wahhabism; Takfirism; Islamic extremism; Jihadism; Salafi jihadism; Identity politics; Clan politics; Minority interests; Anti-Sufism; Irredentism; Anti-Ethiopian sentiment; Anti-Kenyan sentiment; Anti-Zionism; Anti-Western sentiment; Anti-Turkish sentiment
- Status: Active
- Size: 15,000–18,000 (2022 estimate per Hassan Sheikh Mohamud); 7,000–12,000 (2023 UN estimate)
- Wars: Somali Civil War; Somalia War (2006–2009); American military intervention in Somalia (2007–present); Somali Civil War (2009–present); 2025 Shabelle offensive; Ethiopian civil conflict; 2022 Al-Shabaab invasion of Ethiopia

Harakat al-Shabaab al-Mujahideen, (Note: Arabic: حركة الشباب المجاهدين, romanized: Ḥarakat ash-Shabāb al-Mujāhidīn, lit. 'The Mujahideen Youth Movement' Somali: Xarakada Mujaahidiinta Al-Shabaab) simply known as al-Shabaab, (Note: US: /ælʃəˈbɑːb/; Arabic: الشباب, romanized: ash-Shabāb, lit. 'The Youth') is a transnational Salafi-Wahhabi Jihadist militant organization. It is involved in the ongoing Somali Civil War, controlling a non-contiguous network of primarily rural areas in southern and central Somalia that some consider a quasi-state. The group refers to the territory under its control as the Islamic Wilayaat of Somalia. The Federal Government of Somalia does not recognize these titles or territorial claims. Al-Shabaab has invoked takfir to rationalize its terrorist attacks on Somali civil servants and civilians. It is, in a more limited capacity, active elsewhere in East Africa, and is the official branch of al-Qaeda in the region. Al-Shabaab has been designated as a terrorist organization by numerous countries. The militant group remains subject to international sanctions imposed by the United Nations Security Council, the European Union, and other jurisdictions.

Formed in the mid-2000s as a youth militia within the wider military wing of the Islamic Courts Union, Al-Shabaab came to prominence during the 2006–2009 Ethiopian invasion and occupation of Somalia, during which it presented itself as a vehicle for the waging of armed resistance against the occupying Ethiopian army. In subsequent years, it gained popular support from Somalis and became a dominant force in south and central Somalia, defending large swathes of territory by fighting against the African Union Mission to Somalia and the Federal Government of Somalia, as well as the latter's transitional predecessor. Al-Shabaab gained international prominence due to its recruitment of foreign fighters. The group is presently the most wealthy Al-Qaeda affiliate in the world.

Between 2011 and 2013, a coalition of African Union forces, led by the Somali government, wrested a significant amount of territory from Al-Shabaab, including the capital city, Mogadishu. During the same period, the group was plagued by internal conflicts over its leadership and ideological direction, which intensified when, in February 2012, Al-Shabaab's leadership pledged allegiance to al-Qaeda. It suffered further military losses in 2014, as a result of Operation Indian Ocean, and the killing of its emir, Ahmed Abdi Godane. Several years thereafter, Al-Shabaab retreated from the major cities, but it remained influential in many rural areas, and it prioritized guerrilla attacks over territorial acquisitions.

It is responsible for many high-fatality attacks, including the 2013 Westgate attack, October 2017 Mogadishu bombings and the 2022 Somali Ministry of Education bombings. Apart from its activities in Somalia, the group also operates in East African neighboring countries, extending its insurgency to Kenya's border regions with its Jaysh Ayman wing and carrying out a major incursion into Ethiopia in 2022. Attendant to its recent resurgence, it was estimated to have increased its combat strength to between 7,000 and 18,000 fighters during 2022.

== Name ==
Al-Shabaab is also known as Ash-Shabaab, as well as Jaysh al-Usra in Somalia (Arabic: جيش العسرة في الصومال). The term Al-Shabaab means "The Youth" in Arabic. It has also referred to itself as the Islamic Wilayat of Somalia or the Islamic Emirate of Somalia, although it has not formally declared itself as an emirate. These are self-proclaimed titles and claims unrecognized by any Somali state authorities.

The Federal Government of Somalia often refer to Al-Shabaab as the Khawarij (Kharijites). (Note: Several variants of the term are used, including Khawarij Shabaab, Al-Khawarij, the Khawarij, and Khawarij Al-Shabaab.) The Somali government has instructed local media to refer to the militant group by the acronym UGUS (Somali: Ururka Gumaadka Ummadda Soomaaliyeed; English: The Group that Massacres the Somali People). Journalists have faced pressure following the directive issued by Somalia's National Intelligence and Security Agency (NISA), while al-Shabaab has threatened those who use the term.

== Organisation and structure ==
=== Origins ===
Although it is unclear when Al-Shabaab was formed, it is understood to have originated as a youth militia within the military wing of the Islamic Courts Union, an umbrella group which provided de facto governance in much of Somalia until the country was invaded by Ethiopia in December 2006. From 2007 to 2008, Al-Shabaab established itself as an independent actor, gaining prominence as a vehicle of armed resistance against the Ethiopian military occupation. Many of its early leaders and members previously belonged not only to the Islamic Courts Union but also to the older Al-Itihaad al-Islamiya, a group founded on the tenets of Islamism and opposition to clannism. Many early Al-Shabaab leaders had also been trained as mujahideen in Afghanistan and practiced the Hanafi school of jurisprudence.

=== Ideology ===
Al-Shabaab adheres to a radical militant interpretation of the Wahhabi ideology, and generally advocates a form of jihadism with transnational aims, linking local grievances to the plight of Muslims worldwide. According to the International Crisis Group, Salafism has been a core unifying principle of Al-Shabaab, although this principle is not interpreted uniformly by the group's members and leaders. The ideology of Al-Shabaab represents a fusion of the transnational Salafi Jihadist trend in Somalia, which collaborated with the Takfir wal-Hijra group, with the hardline elements of Wahhabi groups in Somalia. Certain elements of Jama'at al-I'tisam supported the setting up of early al-Shabab training camps, and its most hardcore faction merged into Al-Shabaab in late 2004.

Following its pan-Islamist political outlook, incursions into Somalia by Ethiopia – and later by Kenya, the United States, and others – are viewed by Al-Shabaab as part of a wider American-sponsored war against Islam. For instance, Al-Shabaab denounced the 2006 Ethiopian invasion of Somalia as a "Zionist-Crusader aggression", in which the United States "unleashed its 'hunting dogs' in Ethiopia and Kenya" by deploying "the world's crusader forces" to counter the rise of the Islamic Courts Union. However, this globalist framework is not universal within the group, an ideological fault-line which has sometimes fostered factionalism and internal conflict. Much of Al-Shabaab's Somali support base sees as its primary goal the establishment of a stable Islamic state inside Somalia, or, more ambitiously, inside the irredentist concept of Greater Somalia, uniting the ethnic Somali populations of Ethiopia, Kenya, and Djibouti. Other domestic supporters are concerned primarily with clan-related and local objectives, and are therefore prone to infighting and shifting alliances.

However, these ideological differences can accommodate broad opposition within the group to common adversaries – notably, opposition to external intervention in Somalia, often publicly expressed in quasi-Qutbist terms; and opposition to the internationally recognised Federal Government of Somalia (FGS), which, lacking a basis in religious (Sharia) law, is seen to lack legitimacy. As part of its opposition to the Somali federal government, Al-Shabaab declares takfir against FGS and justifies attacks against FGS government officials and civilian supporters. Al-Shabaab hardliners broadly adhere to a Takfiri interpretation of the principle of al-wala' wal-bara' (lit. 'loyalty and disavowal'), insofar as it prescribes dissociation from non-Muslims and those perceived as apostates.

A major component of Al-Shabaab's ideology is Islamic expansionism, which is incorporated into its Pan-Islamist cause. Ummah themes warning Somalis of the plots from international NGOs, alongside "Christian Crusaders" (United States, Ethiopia, AMISOM) and their collaborators, are a regular feature of the movement's propaganda. During the Ethiopian invasion of Somalia, Al-Shabaab positioned itself as a militia under the Islamic Muqawwama (resistance coalition) of the Islamic Courts Union, taking the most hardline stance against the invading "Christian crusaders". After the collapse of the ICU in 2007, Al-Shabaab launched its own independent insurgency, gaining popular support from Somalis for defending the country from American imperialism and foreign occupation. al-Qaeda began enhancing its co-operation and support to Al-Shabaab during this period, which enabled the movement to establish itself as the strongest military power in Southern Somalia. Al-Shabaab regards Somalia's Federal Government as an illegitimate "apostate" entity backed by foreign invaders.

The group has persecuted those individuals belonging to Somalia's small Christian minority, whom it accused of aiding the agenda of foreign "Crusaders" to "convert Somalis to Christianity". In 2009, Al-Shabaab destroyed a Sufi shrine and its associated graves, asserting that over-embellishing burial sites into shrines is incompatible with Sharia. Al-Shabaab has clashed with the pro-AMISOM Sufi militias of Ahlu Sunna Waljama'a. In addition, its statements have expressed anti-Zionist sentiments, and the group claimed that its 2019 DusitD2 complex attack was retaliation against the declaration of Jerusalem as the capital of Israel. In 2025, Al-Shabaab condemned the Israeli recognition of Somaliland.

=== Size and governance ===
In 2017, observers estimated that Al-Shabaab comprised between 7,000 and 9,000 fighters. In 2018, the Council on Foreign Relations and United States military revised this figure downwards, estimating 3,000 to 6,000 and 4,000 to 6,000, respectively. Reflecting an apparent Al-Shabaab resurgence, the United States Africa Command estimated 5,000 to 10,000 fighters two years later, in 2020. Most recently, an expert report submitted to the United Nations Security Council in early February 2022 estimated that Al-Shabaab's fighting force had grown to between 7,000 and 12,000 fighters. In late 2022, President of Somalia Hassan Sheikh Mohamud stated the faction had around 15,000 to 18,000 fighters.

The group is led by an executive tanfid council of 7 to 14 members—a configuration also seen in equivalent organisations such as al-Qaeda—supported by a consultative shura. It operates several internal departments known as makhtab, including Jabhat (military), Sanaaca (explosives), Da'wa (preaching), Zakat (taxation), Wilayah (local administration), Garsoor (Islamic courts), Amniyat (intelligence agency) and Jaysh al-Hisbah (police force). The organization appoints governors (waali), of whom there are ten, who oversee all civil services in Al-Shabaab-controlled areas, including welfare and roads.

=== Membership ===
Especially in its early years, Al-Shabaab was sometimes described by its opponents as dominated by the prominent Hawiye clan, who remain influential in the group. According to a 2018 analysis by the Somali Hiraal Institute, five of the ten members of the executive shura council were Hawiye, as were about 94 of the top 220 officials. However, Al-Shabaab opposes clannism, and has tried to appeal to minority groups and to appoint leaders from a variety of ethnic groups and clans. It incorporates a relatively large contingent of foreign fighters. Rank-and-file members, though sometimes recruited by force, are also attracted by the regular pay that Al-Shabaab offers and by its political propaganda. In the past, many young Al-Shabaab recruits were drawn from marginalised southern groups, such as the Jareer ethnic minority. Many are children.

In February 2012, Fu'ad Qalaf Shongole, an Al-Shabaab officer with responsibility for "awareness raising", encouraged a Somali gathering to send their unmarried daughters to fight jihad with Al-Shabaab. Until then, Al-Shabaab had used only male fighters. However, according to International Crisis Group, women rarely participate directly in military affairs, though they do play important roles in recruitment, intelligence, and explosives smuggling.

== History ==
Al-Shabaab was founded in Las Anod, Sool region, in 2003. During that same year, the American Central Intelligence Agency began covert operations targeting the Islamic Courts Union (ICU) by backing anti-ICU Somali warlords with the aim of preventing the formation of a 'Taliban like' state in Somalia that could provide haven to al-Qaeda. In 2005, Mogadishu was hit by a significant wave of unexplained assassinations and disappearances. The Islamic Courts claimed that covert US government operations and warlords were targeting high ranking ICU officials. According to C. Barnes & H. Hassan, "It was in this context that a military force known as Al-Shabaab ('the Youth') emerged, related to but seemingly autonomous of the broad based Courts movement." Contrary to many reports, Al-Shabaab was neither the armed wing of the Islamic Courts Union nor its most important military component. Al-Shabaab fighters operated as the youth wing of the Courts' militia and gained a fierce reputation during the war against the CIA-backed Somali warlord alliance in Mogadishu in early to mid-2006, distinguishing themselves within the ICU's military wing.

=== 2006–2009: Ethiopian invasion ===
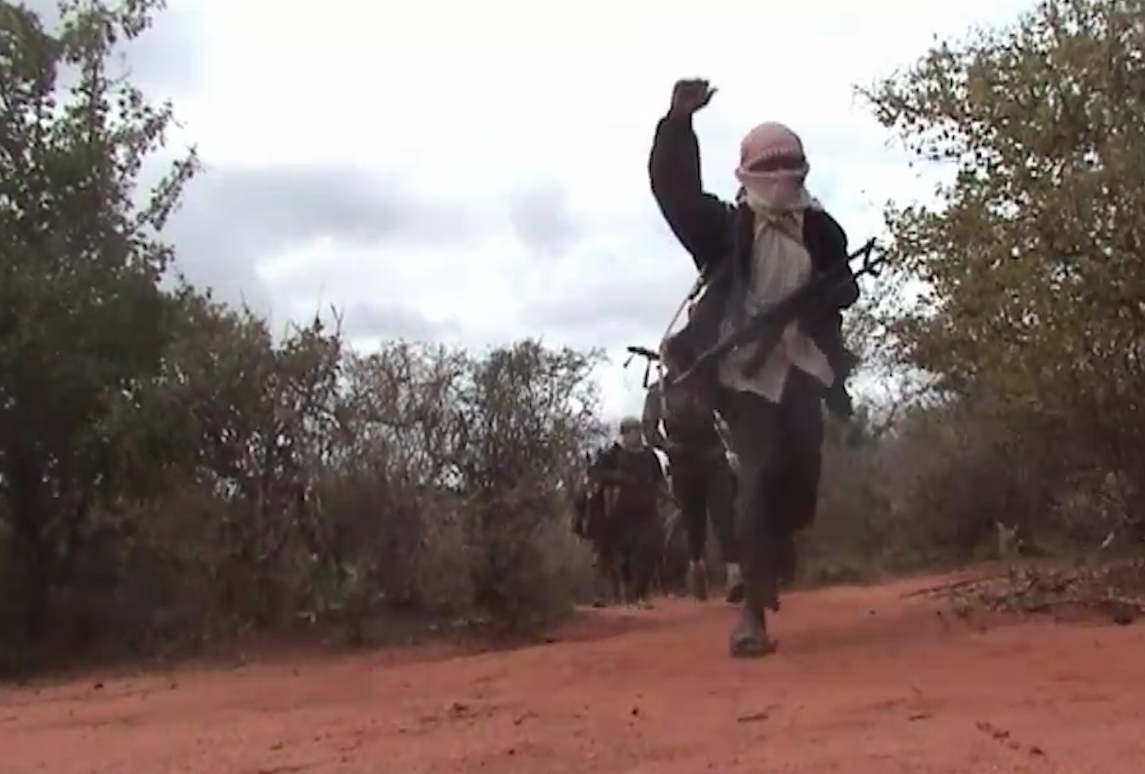
Al-Shabaab insurgents marching through Bay region during the Ethiopian military occupation (15 July 2008)

Al-Shabaab rose to prominence and radicalized following the full scale Ethiopian invasion of Somalia during December 2006. At the time, Al-Shabaab was about six hundred fighters strong. The invasion resulted in the deaths of many Islamic Courts Union affiliates, leaving a vacuum for the small group of several hundred youth that served as the ICU's Shabaab militia to gain prominence. During the military occupation the group garnered popular support from across many segments of Somali society, as Al-Shabaab was widely viewed as a genuine resistance movement against the Ethiopian military occupation; despite its inclinations towards hardline interpretations of Islam. Though the invasion had fractured the Islamic Courts Union, it galvanized non-ethnic religious Islamic nationalism on which Al-Shabaab capitalized, especially for recruitment purposes, with thousands of new recruits drawn to the group.

During 2008, Al-Shabaab began rapidly expanding and governing territory for the first time. The African Union reported Al-Shabaab was about 2,000 fighters strong during 2008. Many ordinary citizens had been radicalized by the US-backed Ethiopian invasion, enabling Al-Shabaab to firmly embed itself in the regions social, economic and political environment. According to Cocodia, "Al-Shabaab from an objective standpoint is the response of an unlawfully deposed regime employing all means possible to reclaim the authority that was wrenched from it." In the initial years, many Somalis perceived Al-Shabaab as disciplined, orderly, and fair, which earned the group significant legitimacy. However, this perception was later lost due to their arbitrary rulings.

Most people who had joined Al-Shabaab appeared to be motivated by the behavior of Ethiopian troops rather than an ideological commitment to Al-Qaeda. Violence and war crimes against civilians carried out by the Ethiopian military rallied many to support the organization, and over the following two years Al-Shabaab became battle hardened. In this period, the group laid the foundation for an enduring insurgency in Somalia, establishing networks and territorial bases concentrated in the rural south-central regions.

A critical juncture in transformation of Al-Shabaab was the assassination of the groups military leader Aden Hashi Ayro in an American airstrike during May 2008. It resulted in several significant developments for Al-Shabaab, most prominently the accession of Ahmed Godane to leadership of the organization. Godane moved Al-Shabaab in a far more violent direction, alienating many fighters and civilian supporters. The assassination of Ayro did nothing to prevent the groups expansion. The withdrawal of Ethiopian troops in January 2009 significantly diminished the public support that Al-Shabaab had previously enjoyed as a resistance faction. However, this move came too late to have a substantial impact on the group's transformation into a formidable oppositional force.

=== 2009–10: Dominance in the South ===
Having made important territorial gains from mid-2008, Al-Shabaab increasingly focused its attention on opposition to the Somali Transitional Federal Government, as the Ethiopian-led war segued into the next phase of the protracted Somali Civil War. By 2009–10, Al-Shabaab controlled most of central and southern Somalia (south of the semi-autonomous region of Puntland), and it had formed administrative structures to govern territories under its control. It had particular success building relationships with local leaders in order to build cross-clan coalitions, combining its principled anti-clannism with a "pragmatic clannism": a willingness to manipulate clan networks and exploit inter-clan politics.

By 2009, Al-Shabaab started drastically altering its choice of targets and frequency of attacks. The use of kidnappings and bombings in urban areas significantly grew in use. The groups significant support from the Somali diaspora dwindled in response to the usage of terror tactics.

=== 2011–13: Internal and external challenges ===
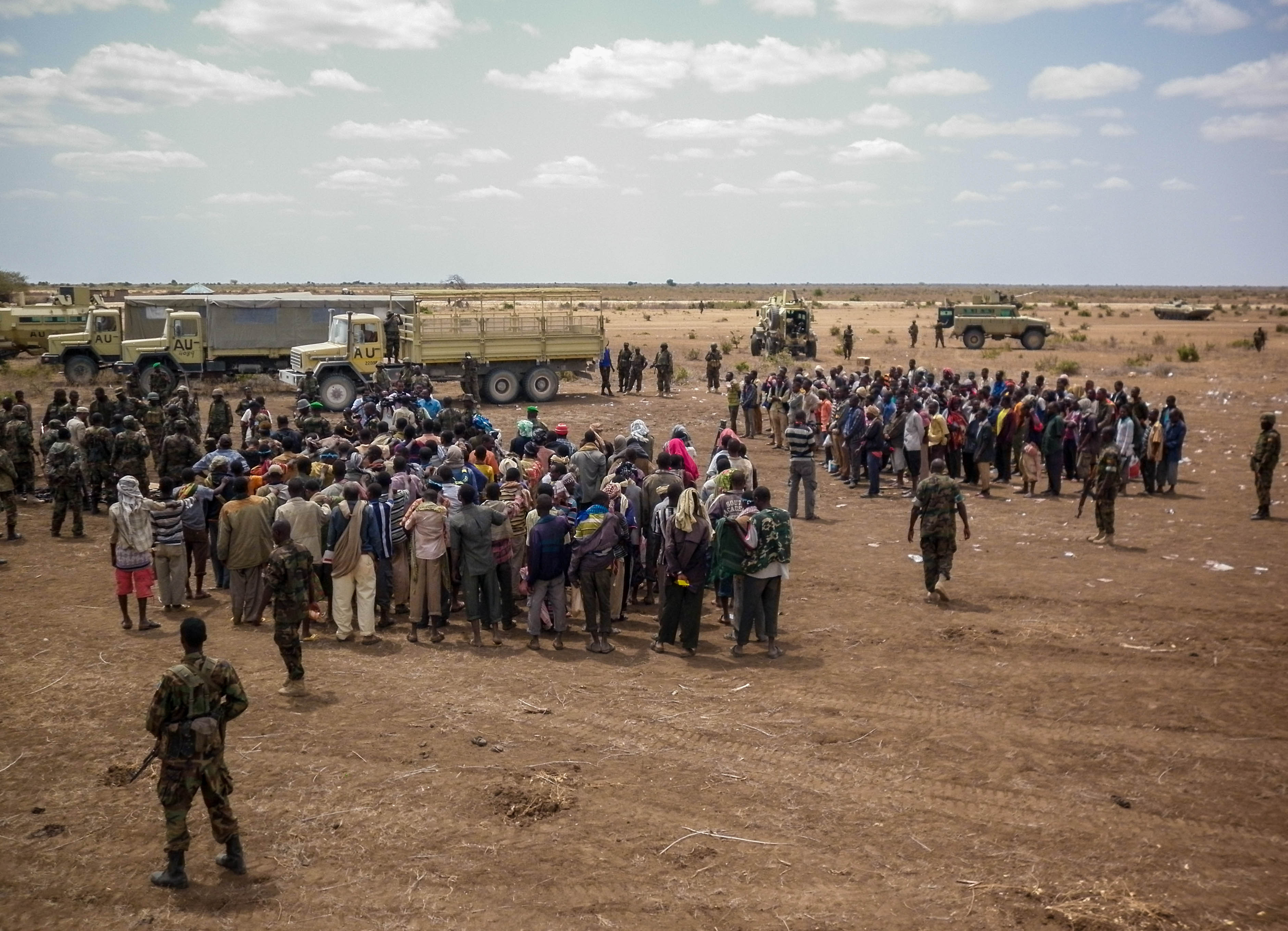
Over 200 Al-Shabaab fighters surrender to AMISOM, September 2012.

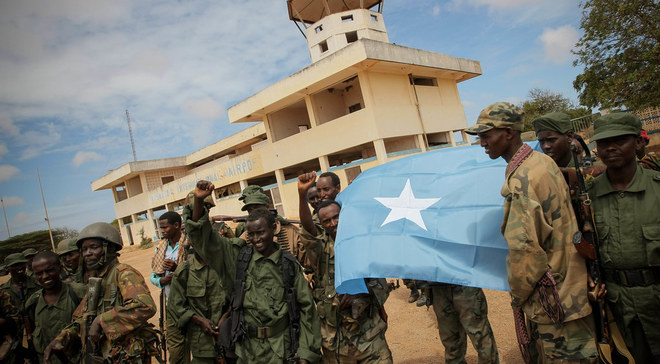
Somali and Kenyan troops celebrate Al-Shabaab's retreat from Kismayo Airport, 2012.

In subsequent years, however, Al-Shabaab's strong position was significantly weakened, as – in the context of a famine in the region and, simultaneously, a military offensive against the group – the group experienced territorial and strategic setbacks in the military arena; an internal struggle over the group's direction and leadership; and, in response to both, a wave of high-profile defections.

==== Territorial losses ====
The group's military fortunes turned with the failure of the August 2010 Ramadan offensive – the inauguration of the Battle of Mogadishu – which resulted in heavy Al-Shabaab losses. By August 2011, Al-Shabaab had announced a "strategic withdrawal" from Mogadishu, although, from outlying districts, it continued to exert influence in the city and to launch deadly guerrilla attacks against the AMISOM and the TFG. In October and November 2011, Kenya and Ethiopia – partnering with local militias – launched offensives against Al-Shabaab strongholds: Kenya's Operation Linda Nchi on the southern front, while Ethiopia approached from the west. The group lost territory to both the armies, notably losing Baidoa to Ethiopia in February 2012 and losing the port city (and revenue hub) of Kismayo to Kenya in October 2012. Military pressures on the group were sustained into 2013.

==== Drought, al-Qaeda, and internal struggle ====
Some Al-Shabaab members viewed the 2010 Ramadan offensive as disastrously ill-conceived, and subsequent territorial losses galvanised internal opposition to the leadership of Ahmed Abdi Godane, who was publicly named the group's emir in December 2007. As a severe drought afflicted the region, critics, generally associated with the leadership of Hassan Dahir Aweys and Mukhtar Robow, opposed Al-Shabaab's response to the resulting famine, particularly its obstruction of foreign humanitarian aid to populations in its territories. More broadly, they argued that the group's authoritarian style of governance, and use of violence, were causing the group to lose public support. Some suggested that these leadership missteps were the result of Godane's lack of clan roots, which they said led him to undervalue the lives both of civilians and of Al-Shabaab fighters.

These criticisms became intertwined with a broader and pre-existing dispute over the increasingly globalist flavour of Al-Shabaab's ideology – Godane was among the faction which viewed Somalia as only one battleground of global jihad. Godane's announcement in February 2012 of a merger with al-Qaeda thus also met opposition. Other senior Al-Shabaab members met at a conference in Baidabo, and outlined a policy programme which diverged from Godane's: they rejected Godane's proposal to change the group's name to al-Qaeda in East Africa, and resolved to focus on domestic issues rather than global jihad. They also resolved to establish a regional shura of Islamic clerics, independent of al-Qaeda control. Godane's rival Aweys declared publicly that "Al-Shabaab and al-Qaeda are merely a small part of the larger Islamic group and al-Qaeda's ideology should not be viewed as the sole, righteous path for Islam."

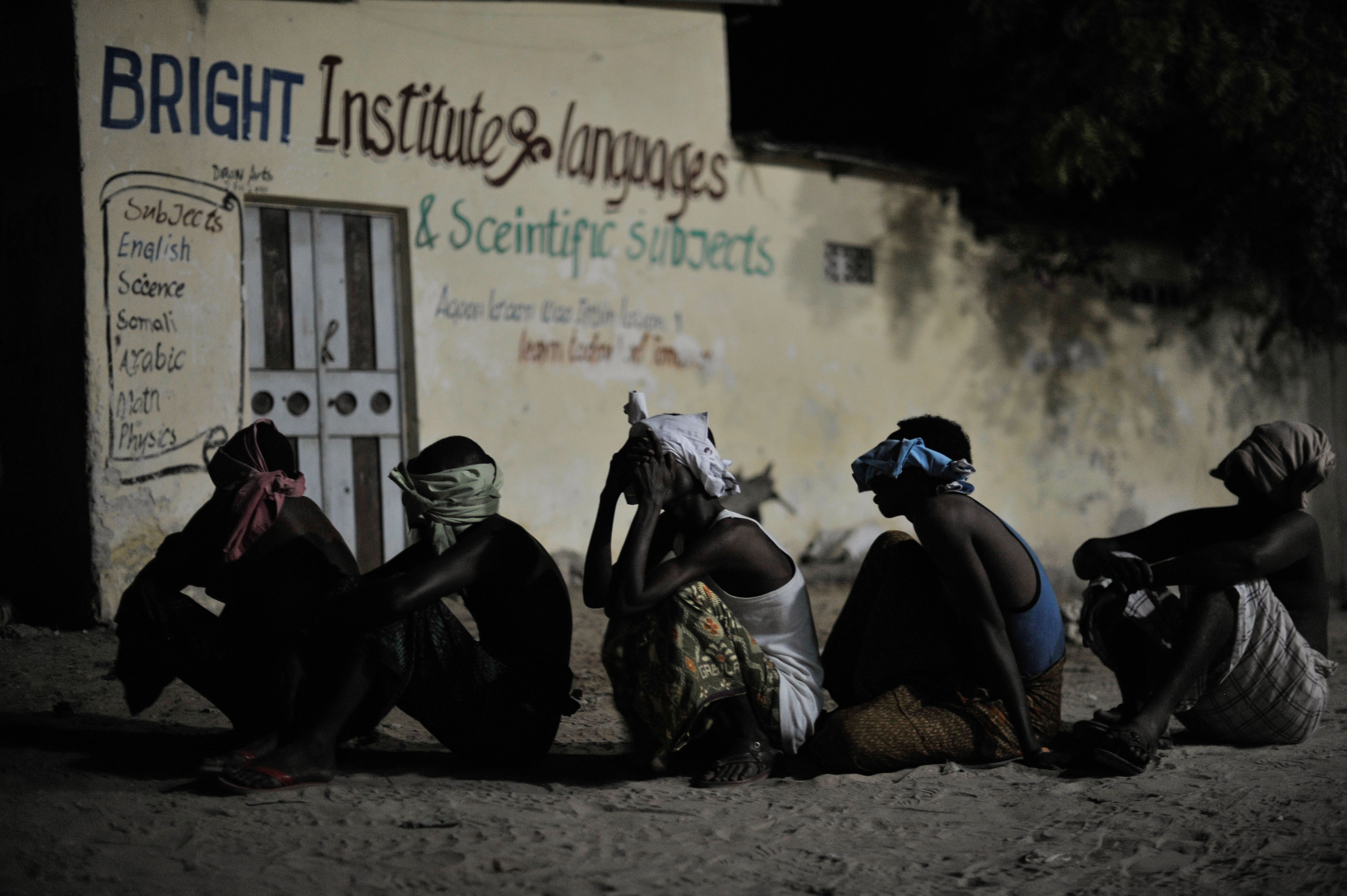
Suspected Al-Shabaab militants in Mogadishu during a joint operation between Somali forces and AMISOM, May 2014

In 2013, these internal rifts led to internecine violence as Godane effected what was virtually a purge of his critics. Among those killed were Ibrahim al-Afghani and three other senior commanders, executed in June; and Omar Hammami, killed in September. Journalist Simon Tisdall viewed the September 2013 Westgate shopping mall shooting in Nairobi, Kenya as a reflection of the internal power struggle, with Godane's hardline globalist faction seeking to exert its authority.

==== Defections ====
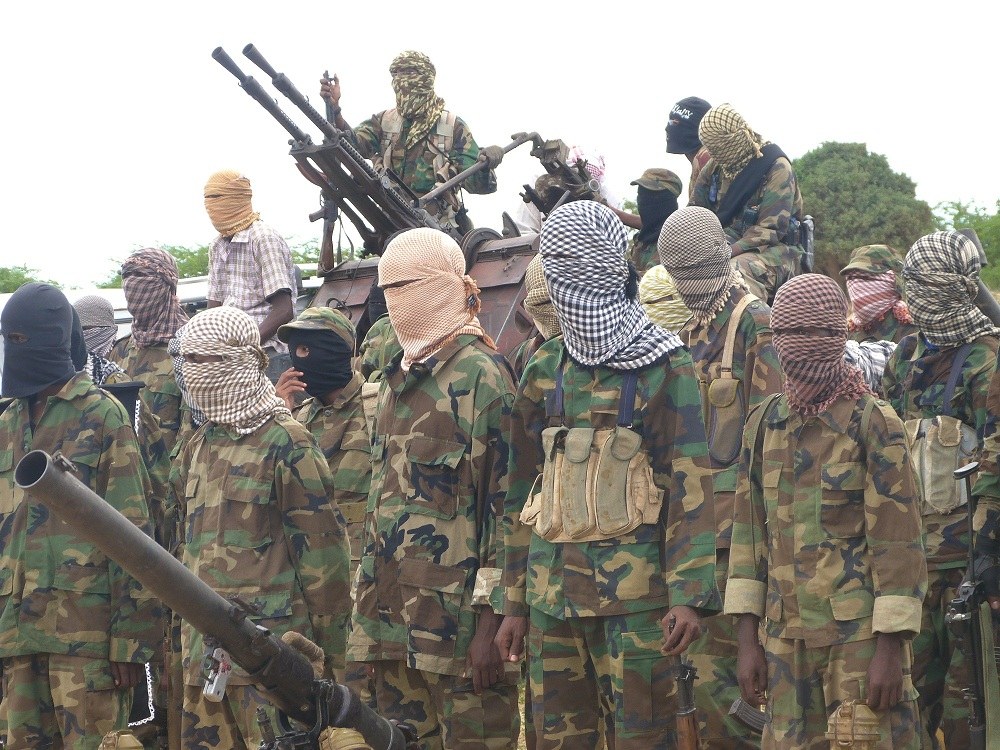
Al-Shabaab fighters in the city of Barawe in 2013

From mid-to-late 2011, and into 2012, Al-Shabaab faced an increasing number of defections. It was not the first such wave of defections: in particular, in late 2009, after the Ethiopian departure from Somalia, several leaders had defected to the Somali government, citing complaints about Al-Shabaab's use of suicide attacks and executions; its "false interpretations of Islam"; and its use of extortion and attitude towards foreign humanitarian aid. Such defections were viewed as strategically important to Al-Shabaab's adversaries, not only for their propaganda use but because former militants could provide intelligence about Al-Shabaab's combat strategy. However, according to the AMISOM and the Somali government, the volume of defections in the period around 2012 was unprecedented, and indicated that Al-Shabaab's cohesion and authority were deteriorating: in June 2012, the government said that around 500 Al-Shabaab militants had already defected to it, and that more were doing so every day. Al-Shabaab brutalities, which alienated local populations, were again cited as central in motivating defections. On 5 September and 22 September 2012, two large contingents of Al-Shabaab fighters – around 200 each time – surrendered to the government coalition in Afmadow and Garsale respectively. Another wave of defections and desertions followed Godane's 2013 purges – Aweys, for example, fled the group in mid-2013.

=== 2013–2017: Regrouping ===
Following its territorial losses, Al-Shabaab reverted to the tactics of asymmetric warfare, launching guerrilla attacks on the AMISOM and government positions and territories. Southern commander Aweys had announced this new strategy in a media interview shortly after the withdrawal from Mogadishu in August 2011. Al-Shabaab increasingly avoided direct military combat and large battles, in favour of "dictat[ing] the conflict's pace by undertaking smaller ambushes at locations of its own choosing". The group undertook high-profile attacks outside Somalia such as the Westgate shopping mall attack by four militants left 67 dead - the deadliest attack in Kenya since the 1998 US embassy bombings in Nairobi. That death-toll was exceeded two years later in the Garissa University College attack in which 148 people were killed in an attack targeting Christian students. Furthermore, two sophisticated attempts to target airliners were observed in 2016. In February a device in a laptop bag that had passed screening was detonated mid-flight, killing only the bomber, and in March another laptop bomb exploded during screening. Reacting to apparent advances in the group's bomb-making capabilities, the UN Security Council later prohibited the transfer of bomb components to Somalia. The group has also developed a strategy of maintaining a "semi-territorial presence" in key regions and parts of key cities: while it no longer had exclusive and military authority over substantial territory, it retained a sporadic presence, and therefore significant influence, in many places.

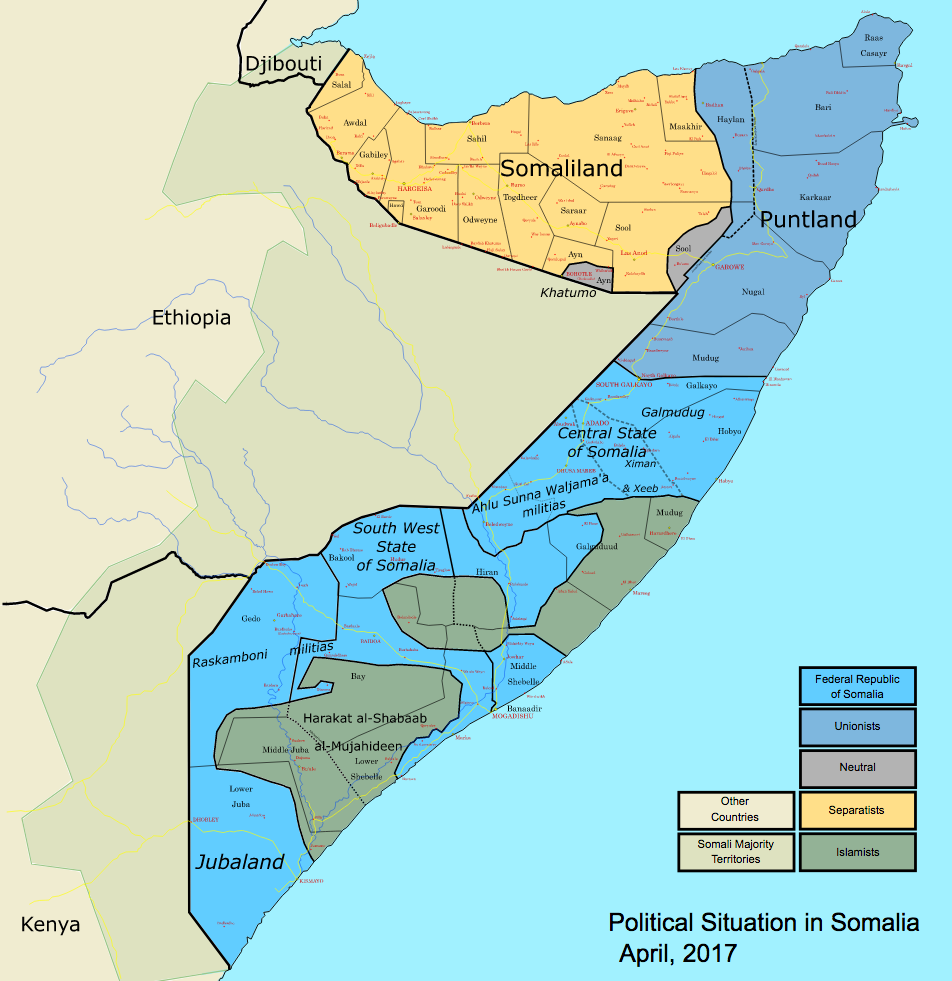
Territorial control of Somalia as of April 2017

Nonetheless, by 2016, Al-Shabaab was viewed as significantly weakened by the military campaign against it, with earlier losses compounded in 2014–15 by Operation Indian Ocean, a joint endeavour by the AMISOM, the Somali government, and the United States. The Somali government claimed in October 2014 that over 700 Al-Shabaab militants had surrendered since September, when it had extended an amnesty offer to them. Reports of further senior defections continued into 2015. Moreover, an American drone strike killed Godane on 1 September 2014; he was succeeded as Al-Shabaab leader by Ahmad Diri, who took office the same week. Other senior members were killed in armed clashes or by American drone strikes in 2014 and 2015. According to some reports, since Godane's death, the group has placed less weight on global jihad than on local grievances.

=== 2018–2022: Resurgence ===
In October 2017, more than 500 people were killed by a suicide truck bombing in Mogadishu, including many children, provoking domestic and international outrage. Al-Shabaab did not claim responsibility for the attack but was suspected of involvement. In December 2019, another suicide truck bomb marked the beginning of a series of Al-Shabaab attacks on the capital city, which continued into 2022. Al-Shabaab also targeted American military personnel in an attack on a Kenyan base in January 2020. By 2020, the group's strategy of semi-territorialism allowed it operate freely in much of rural Somalia, with its primary base in the Jubba River Valley, although air strikes against its leaders continued; and it has recently won military successes against the government. It had also expanded its operations in Puntland, prompting a military offensive by Puntland forces in 2021. As of July 2022, Al-Shabaab is generally considered to be "resurgent", a situation partly enabled by a reduction in the number of American air strikes, and possibly motivated by competition with Islamic State in Somalia, which has been conducting its own expansionary campaign.

On 20 July 2022, Al-Shabaab launched an invasion into Ethiopia's Somali Region. Taking advantage of the ongoing Tigray War, the goal of the operation was to establish a presence for the group within southern Ethiopia. The incursion began with over a thousand Al-Shabaab fighters staging diversionary attacks on four Ethiopian-Somali border towns in order to allow a force of 500 to 800 fighters to penetrate the Ethiopian security zone and advance into the region, who then advanced 150 km into the region. After two weeks of intense clashes and airstrikes, the ENDF and the Somali Region security forces began to reassert control. A battalion of around 500 Al-Shabaab fighters succeeded in evading the Ethiopian army and reached its main target, the Bale Mountains.

=== 2022–2024: Escalation ===
In August 2022, Somali President Hassan Sheikh Mohamud declared "total war" against Al-Shabaab during a televised address after the group carried out a deadly hotel attack in Mogadishu and also announced that the Somalia military had regained territory from Al-Shabaab in the central Galmudug state and the Southwest state. By September 2022 Somali and the ATMIS offensive operations against Al-Shabaab, with U.S. support, would escalate to the highest point in five years. The operation, which is considered a combined Somali-ATMIS offensive, began in August 2022 and, with assistance from U.S. airstrikes, has been focused on disrupting Al-Shabaab activity in Somalia's central Hiraan region. Other Al-Shabaab-controlled areas in southern Somalia have been targeted by the Somalia military as well. On 20 September 2022, as the military operation progressed, a statement was released by the Somali Ministry of Information which revealed that President Sheikh would not offer any other option than surrender for Al-Shabaab members.

On 29 October 2022, Al-Shabaab took responsibility for a twin car bombing that occurred in Mogadishu targeting the Ministry of Education. The attacks killed 121 people and injured 333, making it the deadliest at the time since 2017.

On 26 May 2023, Al-Shabaab claimed responsibility for an attack that reportedly killed 137 soldiers in the Buulo Mareer base, just 75 mi (121 km) south-west of the capital Mogadishu. Meanwhile, the Ugandan President Yoweri Museveni stated that the number is closer to 54 African Union peacekeepers stationed in Somalia.

In December 2024, the UN Security Council approved a resolution to establish the African Union Support and Stabilization Mission in Somalia (AUSSOM), a streamlined successor to the African Union Transition Mission in Somalia (ATMIS), which ends in 2024. The AUSSOM will deploy up to 12,626 personnel to support Somalia's fight against the Al-Shabaab insurgency.

On 26 December 2024, the militant group of Al-Shabaab confirmed the death of Mohamed Mire Jama, a senior leader of the group, who had been designated as a terrorist by the United States, in an American drone strike near Kunyo Barrow of the Lower Shabelle region in the South West State of Somalia.

=== 2025–present: Offensive and stalemate ===
In early 2025, Al-Shabaab launched a large-scale military offensive, capturing dozens of towns and vast areas of territory. In its most ambitious operation in years, the group's ultimate objective is to seize Mogadishu and overthrow the federal government. Probing attacks that began in January escalated into major offensives on multiple fronts, stretching government troops and auxiliary clan militias to their breaking point. By April the military situation had deteriorated to the extent that waves of rumors were circulating on social media of an impending insurgent assault on the capital. While this did not occur, an attack was carried out on the motorcade of Somali President Hassan Sheikh Mohamud while it was driving through the city. Airstrikes by international actors and sporadic local counterattacks have slowed the advance.

According to The Telegraph, as the group has gained major ground this year, Al-Shabaab has sought to implement a "hearts and minds" strategy, aiming to shed its reputation for repression and for carrying out suicide bombings that frequently kill civilians. Large-scale and indiscriminate suicide attacks in Mogadishu, once capable of killing hundreds, have largely ceased. Analysts have compared the campaign to the Taliban's 2021 offensive in Afghanistan, noting that Al-Shabaab and the Taliban are "very structurally, militarily and ideologically similar." The internationally recognized governments of both Somalia and Afghanistan have been described by observers as products of the war on terror, plagued by corruption, predatory governance, and low public legitimacy.

As of late 2026, the war between Al-Shabaab and the FGS is locked in a stalemate.

== Propaganda strategy ==
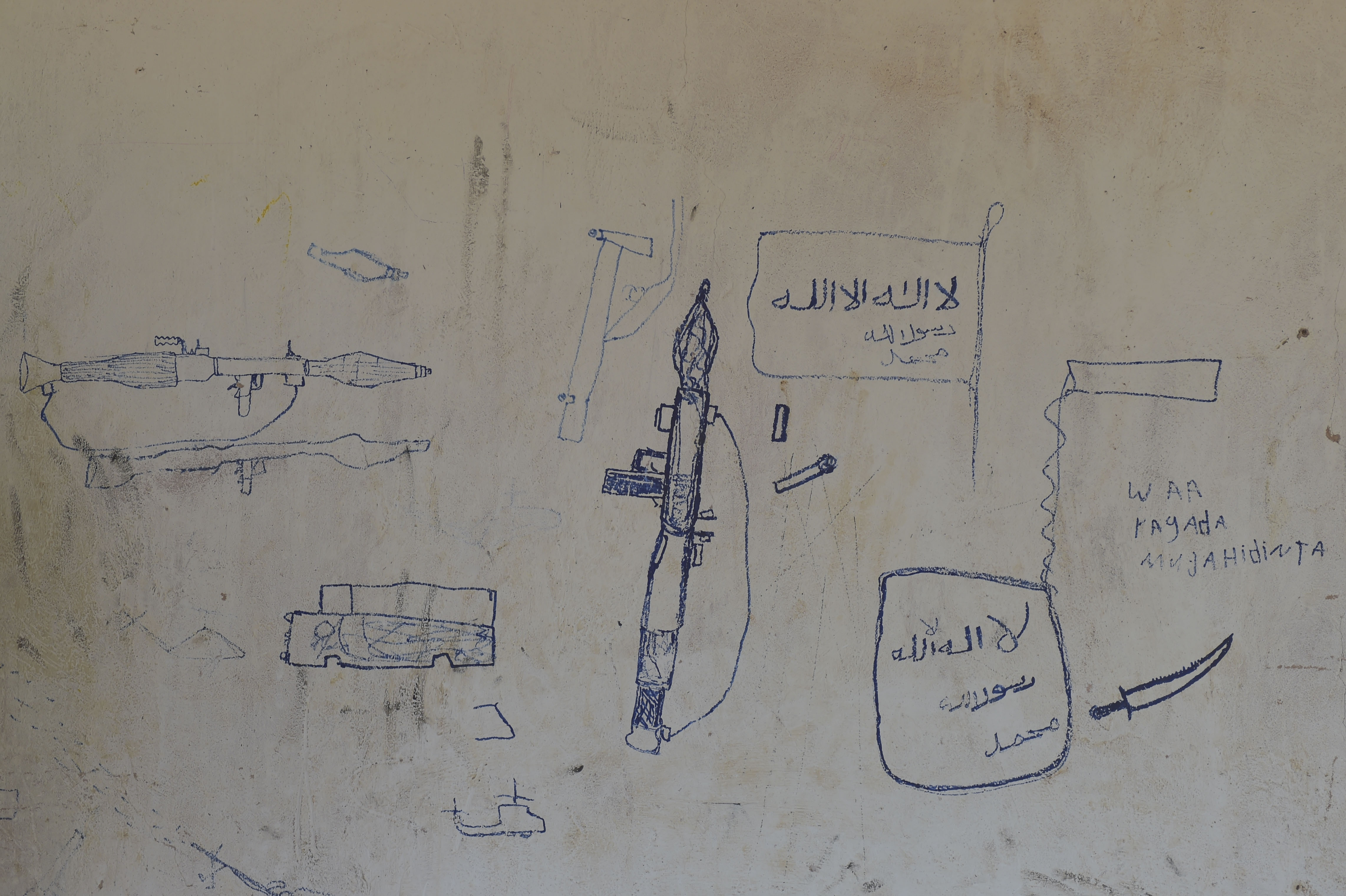
Drawings left by fighters on the walls of a building in El Baraf

Although Al-Shabaab has disseminated its propaganda by various media, the bulk of its engagement with Somalis in rural areas is either face-to-face or by radio broadcast. Face-to-face, the group holds seminars on Islamic jurisprudence and community meetings on such matters such as grain and livestock distribution. It operates its own radio station, Radio Andalus, mainly operated using relay stations and other equipment seized from private radio stations, including the BBC. Presenters broadcast in Somali, Arabic, Swahili and English. In April 2010, Al-Shabaab banned the BBC and Voice of America broadcasts on Somali radio, objecting to what they alleged was Christian propaganda. Also in 2010, and prior to its expulsion from Mogadishu the following year, Al-Shabaab launched a television news channel, al-Kataib News. The group has also been known to conduct military parades in its territories, as a show of force.

=== Propaganda films ===
Al-Shabaab began creating propaganda films early in its campaign against Ethiopian forces, produced by its dedicated media wing, al-Kataib Media Foundation.

Since 2009, Al-Shabaab's films have become noticeably more "professional", both in their production quality and in their messaging, reportedly with direct support from al-Qaeda's As-Sahab Media Foundation. The early films were distributed primarily, and widely, online, and were primarily used as tools for recruitment, particularly among foreign jihadists. More recent films show Al-Shabaab distributing humanitarian aid and participating in other community or religious activities – though others are much more gruesome, displaying the corpses of beheaded members alleged to have been spies. Propaganda films are also occasionally used to attempt to mobilise jihadi activity abroad: in October 2013, one film encouraged British jihadists to follow the example set by Lee Rigby's killers, while a February 2015 film called (without effect) for attacks on shopping malls in Canada, the United Kingdom, and the United States, including the West Edmonton Mall in Alberta, Canada, and the Mall of America in Bloomington, Minnesota.

=== Internet and social media ===
Al-Shabaab was an early adopter among African insurgents of the Internet, which it uses to distribute its propaganda videos and for various other propaganda functions. Especially in its early years, it used online chatrooms and discussion forums, encouraging foreign fighters and even military commanders to post updates and field public questions about the state of the jihad. Particularly prominent was American-born Omar Shafik Hammami, also known as Abu Mansoor al-Amriki, who for many years kept a video blog about his life in Al-Shabaab and who, from 2009, also created and posted raps about jihad. Al-Shabaab also had an official website, which carried official statements and news – including sundry edicts and threats – and religious guidance. Since the site was closed in 2009, it has distributed its press releases and videos using other sympathetic websites, or, more commonly, using social media networks.

Indeed, although Al-Shabaab spokesmen occasionally grant interviews to "carefully selected" local and foreign journalists, social media networks have provided an important channel for interaction with the press, as well as for disseminating information and building support. Al-Shabaab has used Facebook, particularly to communicate with the Somali diaspora; and it has made prolific and innovative use of Twitter since late 2011, although its first accounts were active as early as 2009. Online engagement with Al-Shabaab surged during Operation Linda Nchi, the Kenyan offensive of 2011–12, when Al-Shabaab used Twitter, under the handle @HSMPress, to urge Somalis to take up arms against the Kenyan forces and to portray its own military losses as tactical retreats. In an extreme example of the latter in late 2011, Al-Shabaab photos purportedly showed several dozen AMISOM casualties – but, according to an African Union spokesperson, in fact showed Al-Shabaab's own casualties dressed in their adversaries' uniforms. What received most attention, however, were tweets Al-Shabaab posted mocking the Kenya Defence Forces (KDF) and sparring with Major Emmanuel Chirchir, then the KDF's official spokesman. Responding to Chirchir's claim that Kismayo had been captured by the KDF, Al-Shabaab tweeted that the KDF "boys are a grotesque parody of an army! [Al-Shabaab] can outpace ur world-class runners by far. Indeed, they 'Run like a Kenyan'". Showing uncharacteristic levity, Al-Shabaab also suggested by a tweet that it meet a UN official for "a caramel macchiato".

Most of Al-Shabaab's tweets are in English, suggesting that they are intended for a foreign audience. In 2011, officials in the United States, where Twitter is based, said they were considering having the account closed, but had legal and free speech concerns. Chirchir himself tweeted that such a move would be counterproductive, as "Al-Shabaab needs to be engaged positively, and Twitter is the only avenue." Nonetheless, in January 2013, Twitter suspended Al-Shabaab's English-language account. Observers guessed that the suspension was a response to the account having issued death threats against Kenyan hostages and against the French spy Denis Allex, followed in the latter case by confirmation that the execution had taken place. A new English-language account, opened in February 2013, was closed in September. This suspension also followed an apparent violation of Twitter's rules: Al-Shabaab had recently used the account to claim responsibility for an unsuccessful ambush of a convoy carrying Somali President Hassan Sheikh Mohamud, and to warn that, "next time, you won't be as lucky".

Al-Shabaab relaunched its English-language Twitter account once again on 11 September 2013. Two weeks later, the group gained notoriety for live-tweeting the 2013 Westgate shopping mall attack, "justifying the attack, creating fictional threats, providing news on hostages and mocking the police and military response". The account, which then had 15,000 or more followers, was retweeted several million times before it was shut down by Twitter. And after the @HSMPress Twitter account was deleted, the live updates continued from other, new accounts: over the course of the attack, which lasted several days, at least eight different Al-Shabaab-affiliated Twitter accounts were active. Al-Shabaab had opened a new Twitter account by December that year, with an official telling Al Jazeera that, "The aim is to vigorously challenge defamatory reports in the media by presenting an accurate portrayal of the current state of Jihad in Somalia and countering Western, state-sponsored propaganda machines". It has since tweeted, from various accounts, during other attacks; Facebook, too, has had difficulty expeditiously removing graphic Al-Shabaab content when it appears on newly created accounts. The group is adept in using intricately structured networks of amplifier accounts, leveraging algorithms and emerging technologies, to disseminate its messages.

== Local governance strategy ==
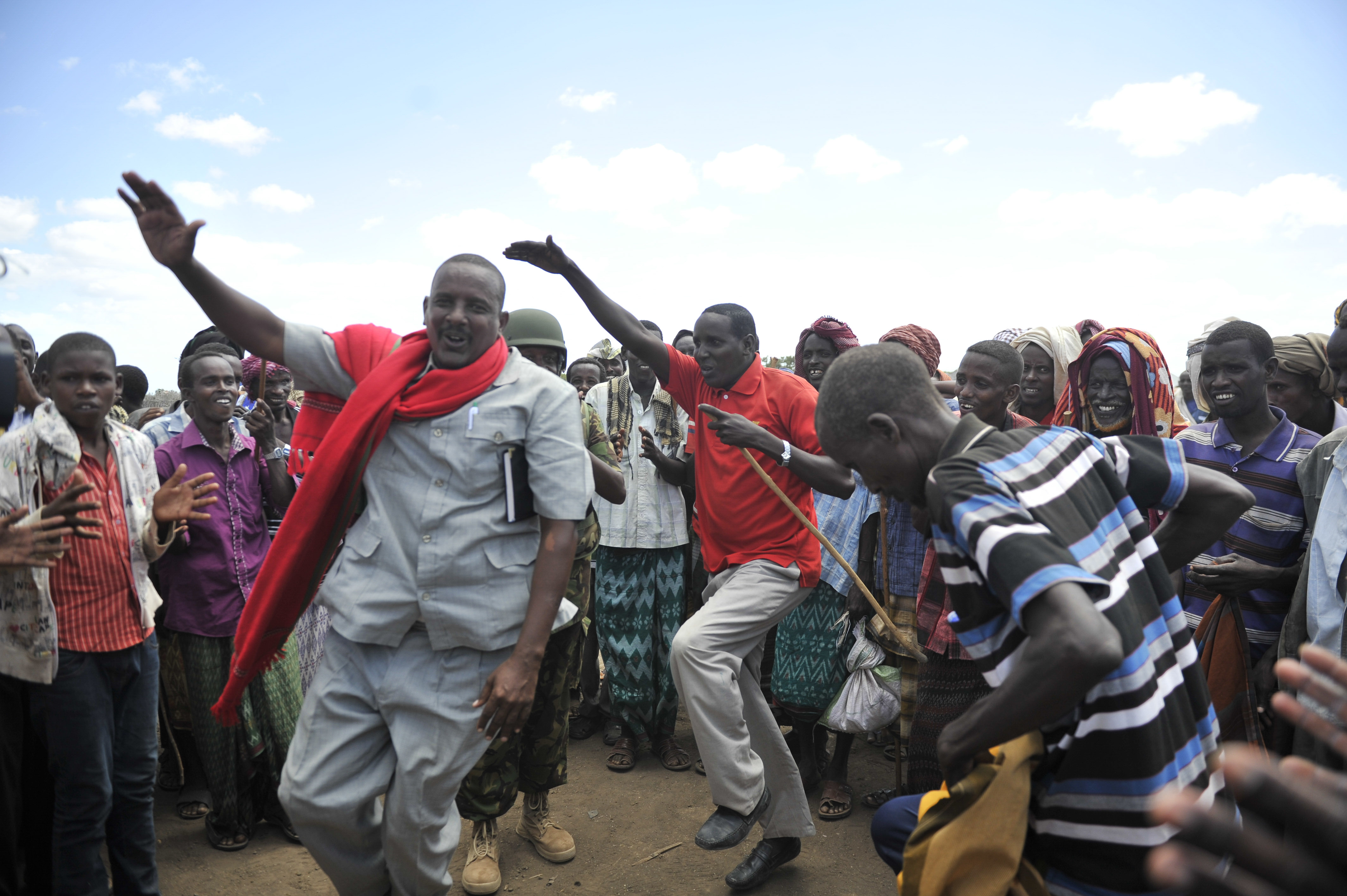
Residents of Tortoro celebrate with Lower Shabelle governor Abdulkadir Mohamed Sidi after the town's liberation from Al-Shabaab, June 2015.

In territories it holds, Al-Shabaab typically maintains "limited but effective" administrative control over resident populations, providing services – such as dispute resolution through Sharia-based courts – which are sometimes compared favourably to those offered in government-held territories. Somalis have been observed to travel out of government-controlled areas into Al-Shabaab territory to settle disputes, particularly involving clan dynamics, lacking trust in the official institutions. Al-Shabaab claimed some credit for Somalia's excellent crop yield in early 2010, saying that Somali grain production had flourished due to Al-Shabaab's reduction of food imports, and that the policy had redistributed income to the poor, rural Somali farmers. However, the group has also allegedly committed widespread human rights abuses against the populations in its territories, including through a brutal interpretation and application of Islamic jurisprudence on hudud.

=== Humanitarian access ===
Despite routinely expelling, attacking, and harassing aid workers, Al-Shabaab permits some agencies to work in areas under its control. At the height of its territorial control it implemented a system of aid agency regulation, taxation and surveillance. Where the agencies are allowed to operate, this is often due to the desire of Al-Shabaab to coopt and materially and politically benefit from the provision of aid and services. Senior aid agency representatives often strongly rejected claims that they talked with Al-Shabaab, while aid workers working in Al-Shabaab-controlled areas often reported they directly negotiated with the group out of necessity. Complaints made against the group include its attacks on aid workers. According to the journalist Jon Lee Anderson:

The number of people in Somalia who are dependent on international food aid has tripled since 2007, to an estimated 3.6 million. But there is no permanent foreign expatriate presence in southern Somalia, because the Shabaab has declared war on the UN and on Western non-governmental organizations. International relief supplies are flown or shipped into the country and distributed, wherever possible, through local relief workers. Insurgents routinely attack and murder them, too; forty-two have been killed in the past two years alone.

In 2009, Godane imposed an Al-Shabaab ban on the UN World Food Programme and Western agencies in Somalia. The ban was opposed by other senior members, including Robow and Aweys, but Godane overruled them.

In response to the 2011 Eastern Africa drought, which lasted until early 2012, Al-Shabaab announced in July 2011 that it had withdrawn its restrictions on international humanitarian workers. The group also adapted its propaganda strategy to accommodate the changing circumstances. In some cases, group members employed humanitarian aid as a recruitment tool, using relief supplies as bribes and as an incentive to join the militants, whose numbers had decreased due to casualties and defections. The group members dismissed the UN declaration of famine in various regions as grossly exaggerated and banned various organizations from providing aid to those regions. In response, in August 2011, Somali Prime Minister Abdiweli Mohamed Ali announced the establishment of a new 300-man security force, which, assisted by the AMISOM, was tasked with protecting aid convoys from Al-Shabaab and with securing IDP camps while relief was being distributed. Although fighting disrupted aid delivery in some areas, humanitarian access to Al-Shabaab-controlled areas improved, and a scaling up of relief operations in mid-November prompted the UN to downgrade the humanitarian situation in several regions from famine to emergency levels.

=== Ban on single-use plastic bags ===
In July 2018, Al-Shabaab announced a complete ban on single-use plastic bags within its territory in a broadcast in which it stated that they "pose a serious threat to the well-being of humans and animals alike", and in the same announcement, it also imposed a complete ban on the logging of several species of rare trees. Some have argued that, whilst these environmentally-conscious advances are welcome, they are overshadowed by the group's terrorist activities, whilst others have mocked the United States and other countries for taking less action on climate change than a terrorist group.

=== Response to COVID-19 ===
Al-Shabaab acknowledged the existence of the COVID-19 pandemic and announced the formation of a corona virus prevention and treatment committee. In mid-June 2020, the group announced that it had set up a coronavirus treatment centre in Jilib, about 380 km (236 mi) south of the capital, Mogadishu.

== Foreign recruitment ==
Al-Shabaab is noteworthy in the region for its extensive recruitment of foreign fighters. These foreign recruits include members of the Somali diaspora or ethnic Somalis overseas; citizens of other East African countries; and citizens of countries further afield, including in the Middle East and the West. Non-Somali fighters have occasionally orchestrated high-profile Al-Shabaab attacks, notably the 2010 Kampala bombings and 2019 DusitD2 complex attack in Nairobi. However, of greater importance to Al-Shabaab are the combat experience and specialised skills of some, usually Arab, foreign fighters, which have been linked to Al-Shabaab's increased sophistication in producing explosives, improved sniper capability, and increased propensity to use suicide attacks. Foreign fighters may also have access to networks which improve Al-Shabaab's capacity to recruit and operate in the region, and have made useful contributions to Al-Shabaab's propaganda campaign: early Western recruits helped produce Al-Shabaab's first English-language propaganda, and, thanks to its East African membership, Swahili remains the second most common language in Al-Shabaab publications. Foreign fighters also have symbolic importance for Al-Shabaab propaganda: Al-Shabaab has intentionally played up the diversity of its recruits as a paean to its pan-Islamism – that is, to demonstrate that it transcends clannism and nationalism, embodying a united transnational ummah.

=== Early surge ===
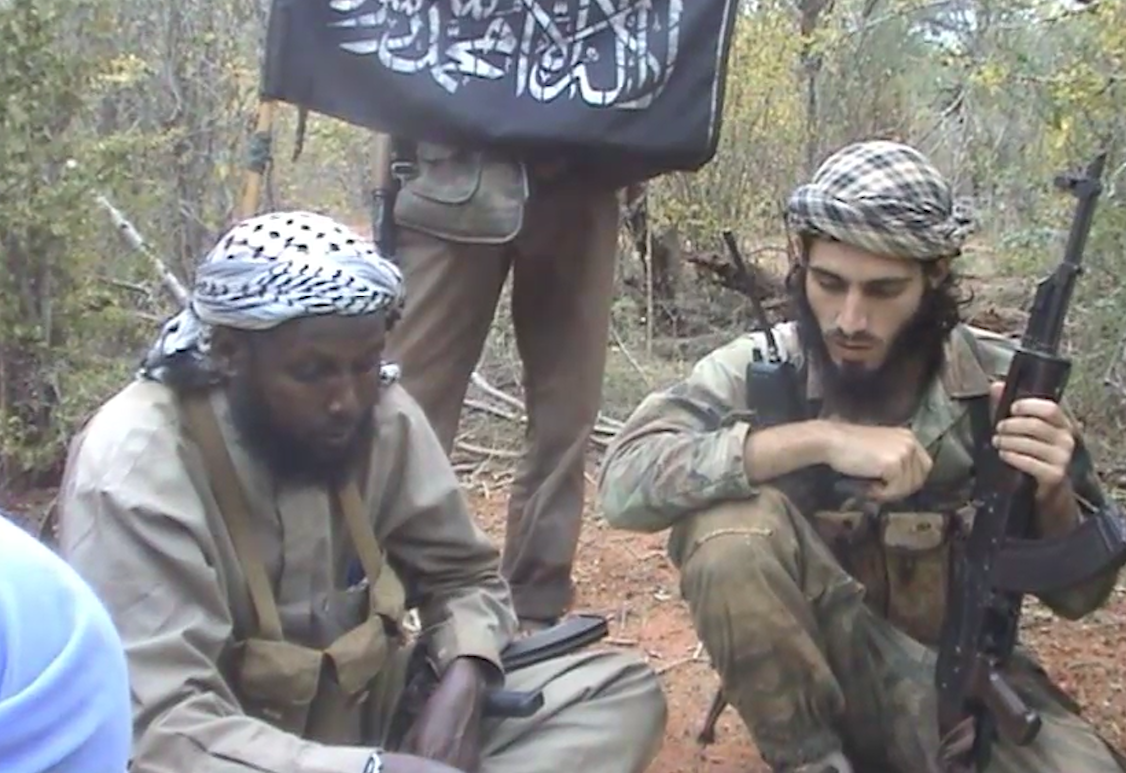
Abu Mansoor Al-Amriki, one of the earliest foreign fighters, seen planning an ambush against an ENDF convoy alongside Mukhtar Robow, the current religious affairs minister of the Federal Government, during the Ethiopian military occupation (15 July 2008)

Foreign recruitment peaked in the period between 2011 and 2013, which was also the period in which the phenomenon received the most attention. The 2006 Ethiopian invasion of Somalia attracted foreign volunteers to Al-Shabaab's cause, and, as of 2010, Al-Shabaab included an estimated 200–300 foreign fighters, not including a further 1,000 ethnic Somalis from the diaspora. In subsequent years, Al-Shabaab recruitment became a concern for the governments of both the United Kingdom and the United States. At a security conference in London in 2010, the former head of MI5, Jonathan Evans, said that "a significant number of U.K. residents" were training with Al-Shabaab; the precise number of British recruits was estimated at between 50 and 100 persons. There was also evidence that the group had received funding from Somali residents in Britain. Between 2012 and 2013, several British citizens faced control orders or even criminal charges related to association with Al-Shabaab.

Sweden, Denmark, Canada, and the United States similarly encountered evidence of citizens' affiliation with Al-Shabaab. In the United States, the U.S. Senate Homeland Security Committee heard as early as 2009 – from Michael Leiter, director of the National Counterterrorism Center – that American and other foreign fighters were being recruited and trained by Al-Shabaab. In 2011, the House Committee on Homeland Security reported that more than 40 Muslim Americans and 20 Canadians had fought with Al-Shabaab, and that at least 15 of those volunteers had been killed in Somalia. Later that year, a U.S. military official told the New York Times that about 30 U.S. citizens were Al-Shabaab fighters. This was a resumption of an earlier trend of Al-Shabaab recruitment among Americans, which previously had peaked in 2007–08. Also in 2011, two Somali Americans in Minnesota were convicted of illegally financing Al-Shabaab. By mid-2013, observers believed that recruitment of U.S. citizens had subsided.

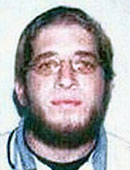
American-born Jehad Mostafa is a senior Al-Shabaab commander.

In general, foreign activity in Al-Shabaab has decreased, first, and perhaps most importantly, because the Syrian civil war became the focal point for foreign jihadist recruitment networks. Other factors, however, are more specific to Al-Shabaab. One factor was the group's internal struggle of 2011–2013: as tensions between Somali and non-Somali members increased, Godane scapegoated the foreigners as the cause of the group's disunity and, during his 2013 purge, executed various foreign recruits. In addition to serving as a disincentive to foreign fighters, this shift reduced the influence of the group's remaining foreign leaders. Moreover, whereas the ascendancy of Godane and his faction had partly internationalized Al-Shabaab, in subsequent years, Al-Shabaab became (re-)"domesticated": as it made territorial gains, its attention was increasingly consumed by local governance and the management of clan dynamics, activities in which foreign fighters – frequently mistrusted by local populations – lacked utility and influence. As the conflict, and Al-Shabaab's priorities, became more localized and clan-based, they also held less appeal for foreign fighters themselves. Foreign fighters also attracted the counter-terrorism efforts of foreign countries, and were sometimes suspected of disloyalty and spying by their Somali peers.

=== Current status ===
As of 2020, estimates of the number of foreign recruits still active in Al-Shabaab ranged from 450 to 2,000. Most of those recruits are from East Africa – primarily Kenya, but also Tanzania and Uganda, all countries in which Al-Shabaab recruitment networks are well entrenched. The flow of recruits from Arab countries and the West has diminished substantially since 2014, except for in the case of Yemen. Moreover, few foreign fighters hold strategically important roles in the group. Many are among the rank-and-file of the military wing. Those in leadership positions tend to have prominent, but strategically marginal or mid-level, roles – for example, in managing the group's public relations or external relations, or in supervising and training other foreign recruits. (Godane's nationalist critics, however, argue that earlier, under his leadership, foreign fighters did in fact gain significant influence over the group.) Since 2013, Al-Shabaab has also established two external military units, on Godane's initiative: one, in Ethiopia, has struggled, but the other, in the Great Lakes region, has carried out several attacks in Kenya.

== Relationship with other militant groups ==
=== Hizbul Islam ===
Between 2010 and 2012, Hizbul Islam, a smaller group of Somali militants, was merged with Al-Shabaab: after suffering military defeats against Al-Shabaab in southern towns, Hizbul Islam was officially absorbed by its former rival in December 2010. However, on 24 September 2012, Hizbul Islam announced that it would split from Al-Shabaab, claiming the union had only ever been nominal and that the factions' political philosophies had differed irreconcilably. Hizbul Islam said that it welcomed "negotiations with all groups for the interest of Somalia", and added that Al-Shabaab had been considerably "weakened" in recent years.

=== Affiliates in Kenya ===
Al-Shabaab has Kenya-based affiliates, with al-Hijra as its official Kenyan wing from 2012, then with a unit established in 2013 known as Jaysh Ayman, based primarily in the Boni Forest. While the former group was used to carry out minor attacks within Kenya, the Al-Shabaab leadership later switched its focus to Jaysh Ayman which proved more effective. Jaysh Ayman comprises both Somali and Kenyan fighters as well as fighters from overseas.

=== al-Qaeda ===
Al-Shabab members pledged allegiance to al-Qaeda in 2012 and has reportedly forged ties with al-Qaeda in the Islamic Maghreb, and al-Qaeda in the Arabian Peninsula. Before 2012, al-Qaeda and Al-Shabaab had what academic Daniel Byman calls an "on-again, off-again" relationship, though both groups praised each other online in 2008. During this early period, Al-Shabaab occasionally harboured al-Qaeda leaders in Somalia, in exchange for their technical assistance. In September 2009, in a video entitled "At Your Service Osama", Al-Shabaab publicly declared allegiance to al-Qaeda leader Osama bin Laden – but this reflected an "unrequited courtship", largely ignored by al-Qaeda. However, after Osama bin Laden's death and replacement by Ayman al-Zawahiri, Al-Shabaab became an official al-Qaeda affiliate in February 2012. In a fifteen-minute video message released on 9 February, Al-Shabaab leader Godane pledged allegiance to al-Qaeda and Aymam al-Zawahiri on behalf of Al-Shabaab. Ayman al-Zawahiri confirmed the alliance, which he said would "please the believers and disturb the disbelievers" and "support the jihadi unity against the Zio-Crusader campaign and their assistants amongst the treacherous agent rulers." The announcement was met with internal opposition among some factions of Al-Shabaab.

By late 2012, the groups cooperated closely in various arenas, especially indoctrination and training, both in basic infantry skills and in advanced explosives and assassination – after the merger, a corps of al-Qaeda-trained militants moved to Somalia to train members of Al-Shabaab. However, Al-Shabaab remained "largely independent". Similarly, although Al-Shabaab has publicly exploited the al-Qaeda "brand", echoing al-Qaeda ideology in its recruitment videos, it is unclear whether the alliance has affected Al-Shabaab's behaviour and aims on the ground. A 2021 statistical analysis suggests that it has not significantly affected Al-Shabaab's military strategy. While an Al-Shabaab commander has claimed that the group will bring jihad first to East Africa "and afterward, with God's will, to America", an analyst at the Center for Strategic and International Studies argues that the group is far more interested in establishing an Islamic State inside Somalia than in carrying out attacks in the West.

=== AQAP, AQIM and Boko Haram ===
In June 2012, General Carter Ham of the U.S. Army said that Al-Shabaab, al-Qaeda in Islamic Maghreb (AQIM), and the Nigeria-based Boko Haram were attempting to coordinate their activities, including in funding, training, and explosives. In 2011, Boko Haram's first suicide bomb attack had been preceded by a public statement warning that "our jihadists have arrived in Nigeria from Somalia where they received real training on warfare from our brethren who made that country ungovernable", which analysts understood as an allusion to cooperation with Al-Shabaab. However, in the view of some observers, most consequential are Al-Shabaab's links to al-Qaeda in the Arabian Peninsula (AQAP). AQAP is based in Yemen, which has longstanding ties to Somalia, and analyst Katherine Zimmerman told the U.S. Congress that AQAP "almost certainly provided the equipment or the expertise" for Al-Shabaab's 2016 laptop bomb.

A so-called Islamic State has emerged in our land and stated to attempt to divide our Mujahidin, weaken our strength and carry out assassinations against our own. We have been ignoring their wicked behaviors for some time to give them a chance to change, but they have continued their wrongheadedness. Our senior command has ordered our fighters to attack and eliminate the 'disease' of IS and uproot the tree that would be used to undermine the fruits of the Jihad.

— Al-Shabaab announces Operation Disease Eradication, December 2018

=== Islamic State ===
In early 2015, the Islamic State of Iraq and the Levant (ISIL) published online the first of a series of videos aimed at Al-Shabaab, calling on the group to switch allegiances from al-Qaeda to ISIL and its leader Abu Bakr al-Baghdadi. These public appeals had reportedly been preceded by informal ISIL attempts to establish a relationship with Al-Shabaab. Yet Al-Shabaab publicly ignored the overtures. By September 2015, it had issued an internal memo, directed at pro-ISIL elements in its ranks, reaffirming the group's allegiance to al-Qaeda and banning any discussion about ISIL. The group also detained several fighters who had voiced support for ISIL.

In October 2015, senior Al-Shabaab commander Abdul Qadir Mumin and approximately 20 of his followers in Puntland pledged allegiance to ISIL, establishing what became Islamic State in Somalia (ISIS). Further defections in Al-Shabaab ranks occurred in the border region between Somalia and northern Kenya, leading the head of Al-Shabaab in the Lower Shabelle region, Abu Abdalla, to announce that all pro-ISIL members should leave the group or be killed. The groups clashed violently on several occasions, most fiercely during 2015, and Al-Shabaab's internal security service continued to arrest, and sometimes execute, suspected ISIS supporters within Al-Shabaab's ranks.

Violent conflict between the groups was reinvigorated in 2018 by ISIS provocation, and, in December, Al-Shabaab's spokesman announced an offensive – code-named Operation Disease Eradication – against ISIS. The same week, Al-Shabaab's general command released an 8-page treatise rebuking ISIS's ideology and listing crimes it had committed under the Quran.

== Sources of income and arms ==
In 2020, the Hiraal Institute estimated that Al-Shabaab collected at least $15 million in revenue every month, implying revenue on a similar scale to the government's; and the UN estimates that the group's military budget was approximately $21 million in 2019. In the period after 2014, Al-Shabaab established its own Ministry of Finance, and it has cultivated various revenue streams, among which it switches as its military position or political circumstances change.

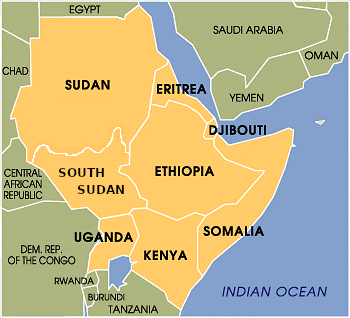
Map showing the Horn of Africa with UN recognized countries

=== External support ===
During its early years, Al-Shabaab received substantial external support in donations from the Somali diaspora or interested international jihadists, enabled by the weakness of the government of Somalia's financial regulation framework and the ubiquitous use of the hawala system for receipt of remittances. Although Al-Shabaab initially appeared as a promising alternative to the Islamic Courts Union, its popularity with diaspora donors declined after the Ethiopian withdrawal and as the group gained a reputation for brutality. Concurrently, however, Al-Shabaab increased its ties to other jihadist groups, especially al-Qaeda, which have extensive capacity to generate income in the Arabian Peninsula and the Horn of Africa. For example, years before Al-Shabaab became an official al-Qaeda affiliate, Osama bin Laden publicly called on Muslims to send money to Al-Shabaab. However, over the past decade, the counter-terrorism efforts of foreign governments have obstructed international funding sources.

According to authorities, the Somali state of Puntland is a key transit point for weapons shipments into Somalia from foreign countries – particularly frequent shipments of small arms and ammunition from Yemen, typically transported across the Gulf of Aden in skiffs, and occasionally larger shipments from the Makran coast of Iran. Puntland authorities have also seized Yemeni explosives shipments, which they suspect are the result of cooperation between Al-Shabaab and the Yemen-based AQAP.

=== Alleged Eritrean support ===
In December 2009, adopting Resolution 1907, the UN Security Council imposed sanctions on Eritrea, accusing the country of arming and financing militia groups, including Al-Shabaab, in southern Somalia's conflict zones. Reports in 2010 and 2011 by a UN International Monitoring Group alleged continuing Eritrean support to Somali rebels – including, in the latter year, about $80,000 in monthly financial support and two air deliveries of weapons – but the Eritrean government emphatically denied the accusations, describing them as "concocted, baseless and unfounded". The International Crisis Group added some credence to Eritrea's denials, suggesting that historical Eritrean support to Somali militants had been aimed at undermining Ethiopia during its 2006–9 invasion, and that Hizbul Islam was more likely a recipient than Al-Shabaab.

On 5 July 2012, the U.S. government imposed sanctions on Eritrea's intelligence chief and a high-ranking military officer, who allegedly facilitated support to Al-Shabaab. However, later that year, the UN Monitoring Group on Somalia and Eritrea reported that it had found no evidence of direct Eritrean support to Al-Shabaab in the preceding year. Between then and 2017, successive annual reports of the Monitoring Group found no evidence for Eritrean involvement, while noting that Eritrea had not provided full access to investigators; nonetheless, the UN Security Council did not enact the group's recommendation to lift its sanctions on Eritrea until November 2018.

=== Internal revenue ===
==== Trade and smuggling ====
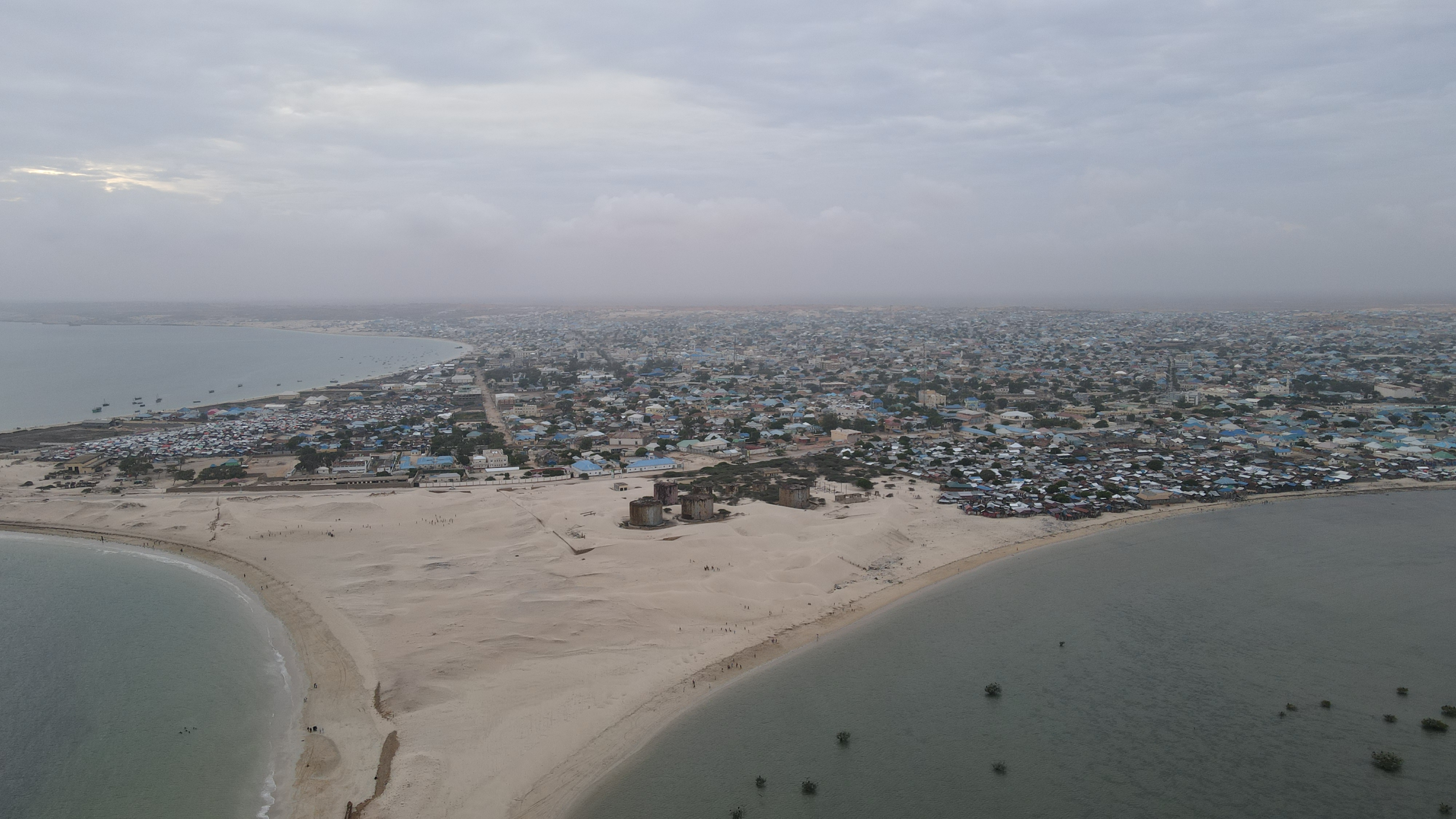
The port city of Kismayo, held by Al-Shabaab between 2009 and 2012, is a charcoal smuggling hub.

As Al-Shabaab expanded its territorial control, it was able to augment its internal funding through illicit markets and local populations. The smuggling of charcoal has been an important source of income for the group since it first gained control of Somali port cities, especially Kismayo. Calculating that Al-Shabaab was earning between $15 million and $50 million annually from illegal trade, the UN banned Somali charcoal imports. The group also profits from involvement in – or taxation of – the smuggling and sale of ivory, sugar, and, reportedly, heroin; and it has been implicated in illegal mining and minerals exports in East Africa. There is some evidence that Al-Shabaab has profited from piracy. In 2011, the head of the UN's counter-piracy division, Colonel John Steed, warned that there was circumstantial evidence that Al-Shabaab increasingly sought to cooperate with pirate gangs and other criminal organizations. Further reports suggested that Al-Shabaab members had extorted pirates, demanding protection money equivalent to 20% of the pirates' ransom proceeds, but did not provide evidence that Al-Shabaab was itself involved in piracy.

==== Extortion and taxation ====
Also in the 2008–2011 period, Al-Shabaab established a sophisticated taxation system, framed as a form of zakat, in line with sharia, but often resembling extortion. Al-Shabaab taxes may apply to clans, traders, corporations, farmers, or livestock herders – in fact, livestock are sometimes stolen outright by Al-Shabaab militants, with the theft framed as a kind of pre-emptive in-kind taxation. Humanitarian aid agencies are also taxed or extorted, in exchange for permission to operate inside certain territories; and Al-Shabaab has been known to execute kidnappings for ransom. In recent years, facing territorial losses in urban areas, Al-Shabaab has had less recourse to previous revenue streams – notably the charcoal trade, through Kismayo, and the remittance economy – and therefore has relied more heavily on extracting zakat. The development of its security and intelligence services has allowed it to expand its tax base by imposing taxes even in areas outside its territorial control: according to the Hiraal Institute, more than half of Al-Shabaab's revenue in 2019–20 came from Mogadishu, whose major companies are taxed at 2.5% of their annual profits. Indeed, a commander in the Somali army confessed to paying tax to Al-Shabaab despite being at war with it. The group has been known to punish non-payment severely, including by blockading villages under threat of starvation.

==== Somali government ====
Either directly or indirectly through black markets, Al-Shabaab has access to arms intended for the Somali government. In 2018 and 2019, expert reports to the UN Security Council found that government military equipment enters the black market, where some of it is sold to Al-Shabaab militants. In some cases, senior government officials orchestrate large-scale diversions of government arms and ammunition; in others, low-ranking members of the security forces sell their weapons for subsistence. An earlier report in 2014 had alleged that government officials were actively involved in the direct supply of governments arms to Al-Shabaab. The group has also been known to infiltrate government institutions, as became clear when regional government employees carried out Al-Shabaab's 24 July 2019 Mogadishu bombing, which killed Mogadishu Mayor Abdirahmean Omar Osman.

== International response ==
=== Terrorist designation ===
The following countries have officially listed Al-Shabaab as a terrorist organization:

- Australia (since 22 August 2009)
- Canada (since 5 March 2010)
- Israel (listed under the Counter-Terrorism Law, 2016)
- Kenya (identified as a terrorist organization by the National Counter Terrorism Centre of Kenya)
- Malaysia
- Netherlands (classified as a terrorist organization by the National Coordinator for Counterterrorism and Security (NCTV)
- New Zealand (since 10 February 2010)
- Singapore (since 18 March 2016)
- Tanzania (listed as a suspected international terrorist group under the Prevention of Terrorism (General) Regulations)
- Uganda (designated as a terrorist organization by the Government of Uganda)
- United Arab Emirates (since 15 November 2014)
- United Kingdom (since March 2010)
- United States (since 29 February 2008)

=== International sanctions ===
In addition to formal terrorist designations, several countries and international organizations have imposed targeted sanctions against Al-Shabaab. Many of these measures implement the United Nations Security Council sanctions regime established by United Nations Security Council Resolution 1844 (2008) and most recently amended by United Nations Security Council Resolution 2713 (2023), which requires all UN member states to impose targeted asset freezes, travel bans, and arms embargoes on designated individuals and entities.

- European Union — Maintains restrictive measures against designated persons and entities associated with the situation in Somalia under Council Regulation (EU) No 356/2010.
- Japan — Implements the United Nations sanctions regime through domestic asset-freezing measures.
- Saudi Arabia — As a member of the Terrorist Financing Targeting Center (TFTC), has jointly imposed targeted sanctions against Al-Shabaab leaders and financial facilitators.
- South Africa — Implements the United Nations sanctions regime through domestic financial sanctions legislation.
- Switzerland — Implements the United Nations sanctions regime through ordinances administered by the State Secretariat for Economic Affairs (SECO).

=== Bounties ===
In 2012, with the support of the Somali government, the United States began issuing bounties for Al-Shabaab members under its Rewards for Justice Program. On 7 June, the U.S. Department of State offered a total of $33 million in bounties for information leading to the capture of any of seven senior commanders, including $7 million for Godane, then the group's emir, and $5 million for Robow, then his deputy. In response, Al-Shabaab's Fu'ad Qalaf issued a mock bounty of his own, promising ten camels to anyone possessing information on the U.S. President Barack Obama, and a further, less valuable, reward of ten cocks and ten hens for information on Hillary Clinton, the U.S. Secretary of State. On an official state visit to Mogadishu, the top U.S. envoy Johnnie Carson dismissed the counter-offer as "absurd". He also announced that the U.S. would impose sanctions, including visa and travel bans and asset freezes, on anyone attempting to thwart the ongoing political transition in Somalia.

On 21 March 2013, the U.S. Department of State offered $5 million apiece for information on two American senior Al-Shabaab commanders, Omar Shafik Hammami and Jehad Mostafa. On 15 March 2014, it issued three further bounties, including one on Abdukadir Mohamed Abdukadir, who it said coordinated Al-Shabaab's recruitment activities in Kenya. On 27 September 2014, after Godane's death, the Somali National Intelligence and Security Agency announced its own bounty, offering $2 million for information leading to the arrest of the new emir, Umar, and a separate $1 million reward for information leading to his killing. Several further Somali bounties were issued on 10 April 2015, with rewards ranging between $100,000 and $250,000. In a separate programme, on 3 April 2015, the Kenyan government offered KSh. 20 million ($215,000) for information leading to the arrest of Mohamed Mohamud, a commander of Al-Shabaab's operations in Kenya.

== Flags ==
Flags of al-Shabaab
Flag of al-Shabaab, used from 2010 - Present

Variant flag of al-Shabaab

== List of leaders ==
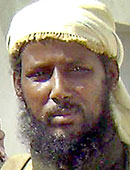
Former leader Mukhtar Robow, also known as Abu Mansur, denounced Al-Shabaab in 2017.

=== Emirs ===
- Ahmad Diri (2014–present)
- Ahmed Godane † (2008–2014)
- Aden Hashi Farah Ayro † (2005–2008)

=== Leading figures ===
Prominent members presently in the top ranks of the organization include:

- Mahad Karate
- Fuad Qalaf
- Ali Mohamed Rage (Ali Dheere)

=== Former members ===
Former leading members of Al-Shabaab include:

- Hassan Dahir Aweys.
- Mohamed Said Atom.
- Mukhtar Robow.
- Abdul Qadir Mumin
- Ibrahim al-Afghani †
- Hassan Abdullah Hersi al-Turki #
- Omar Mohamed "Abu Ayan"

=== Foreign leaders and members ===
Prominent foreign Al-Shabaab members have included:

- Jehad Serwan Mostafa (United States)
- Abu Musa Mombasa (Pakistan)
- Samantha Lewthwaite (Britain) (unconfirmed)
- Fazul Abdullah Mohammed † (Kenya)
- Abdukadir Mohamed Abdukadir (Kenya)
- Omar Shafik Hammami † (United States)
- Mujahid Miski (United States)

== See also ==
- Child soldiers in Somalia
- Drone strikes in Somalia
- Human rights in Somalia
- Islam in Somalia
- Religion in Somalia
- Freedom of religion in Somalia

== Bibliography ==
=== Books ===
- Bacon, Tricia; Muibu, Daisy (2019a). "Foreign Fighter Influence in Al-Shabaab: Limitations and Future Prospects". War and Peace in Somalia: National Grievances, Local Conflict and Al-Shabaab. Oxford University Press. doi:10.1093/oso/9780190947910.003.0037. Archived from the original on 5 January 2024.
- Hansen, Stig Jarle (2013). Al-Shabaab in Somalia: The History and Ideology of a Militant Islamist Group. Oxford University Press. ISBN 978-0-19-932787-4.
- Hansen, Stig Jarle (2017). "Al-Shabaab and the Accidental Jihadists". Africa's Insurgents: Navigating An Evolving Landscape. Lynne Riener Publishers. pp. 181–196. ISBN 978-1-62637-652-6. OCLC 965781617.
- Harper, Mary (2019). Everything You Have Told Me Is True: The Many Faces of Al Shabaab. Oxford University Press. ISBN 978-1-78738-290-9. Archived from the original on 8 May 2023.
- Keating, Michael; Waldman, Matt, eds. (2019). War and Peace in Somalia: National Grievances, Local Conflict and Al-Shabaab. Oxford University Press. doi:10.1093/oso/9780190947910.001.0001. ISBN 978-0-19-094791-0.
- Maruf, Harun; Joseph, Dan (2018). Inside Al-Shabaab: The Secret History of al-Qaeda's Most Powerful Ally. Indiana University Press. ISBN 978-0-253-03749-7. Archived from the original on 16 April 2023.
- Woldemariam, Michael (2018). "The Long War in Somalia: The Somali National Movement, Islamic Courts Union, and Al-Shabaab, 1981–2013". Insurgent Fragmentation in the Horn of Africa: Rebellion and its Discontents. Cambridge University Press. pp. 211–281. ISBN 978-1-108-42325-0. Archived from the original on 5 January 2024.

=== Articles ===
- Kheyre, Zakarie Ahmed nor (10 November 2022). "The evolution of the Al-Shabaab jihadist intelligence structure". Intelligence and National Security. 37 (7): 1061–1082. doi:10.1080/02684527.2022.2095599. ISSN 0268-4527.
- Klobucista, Claire; Jonathan, Masters; Aly Sergie, Mohammed (6 December 2022). "Al-Shababb". Council on Foreign Relations.
- Alkaff, Syed Huzaifah (2013). "Al-Shabaab: A New Phase?". Counter Terrorist Trends and Analyses. 5 (9): 12–15. ISSN 2382-6444. JSTOR 26351183.
- Afriyie, Frederick Appiah (2025). "What fuels terrorism in Somalia? Perspectives from the jihadist group Al-Shabaab". Cogent Social Sciences. 11 (1) 2576151. doi:10.1080/23311886.2025.2576151. ISSN 2331-1886.
- Abdul-Ahad, Ghaith (7 June 2010). "How Somalia's civil war became new front in battle against al-Qaida". The Guardian. Archived from the original on 15 September 2013.
- Anderson, David M.; McKnight, Jacob (2015). "Understanding Al-Shabaab: Clan, Islam and Insurgency in Kenya". Journal of Eastern African Studies. 9 (3): 536–557. doi:10.1080/17531055.2015.1082254. ISSN 1753-1055. S2CID 146688435.
- Anzalone, Christopher (2013). "Al-Shabab's Tactical and Media Strategies in the Wake of its Battlefield Setbacks". CTC Sentinel. 6 (3). Archived from the original on 9 September 2022.
- Doboš, Bohumil (2016). "Shapeshifter of Somalia: Evolution of the Political Territoriality of Al-Shabaab". Small Wars & Insurgencies. 27 (5): 937–957. doi:10.1080/09592318.2016.1208282. ISSN 0959-2318. S2CID 147834973.
- Bacon, Tricia; Ellis, Grace; Milton, Daniel (20 October 2021). "Helping or Hurting? The Impact of Foreign Fighters on Militant Group Behavior". Journal of Strategic Studies. 46 (3): 624–656. doi:10.1080/01402390.2021.1982702. ISSN 0140-2390. S2CID 239511086.
- Bacon, Tricia; Muibu, Daisy (2019b). "The Domestication of Al-Shabaab". The Journal of the Middle East and Africa. 10 (3): 279–305. doi:10.1080/21520844.2019.1658986. ISSN 2152-0844. S2CID 211466646.
- Cannon, Brendon J.; Pkalya, Dominic Ruto (2019). "Why Al-Shabaab Attacks Kenya: Questioning the Narrative Paradigm". Terrorism and Political Violence. 31 (4): 836–852. doi:10.1080/09546553.2017.1290607.
- Chonka, Peter (2016a). "Spies, Stonework, and the Suuq: Somali Nationalism and the Narrative Politics of Pro-Harakat Al-Shabaab al-Mujaahidiin Online Propaganda". Journal of Eastern African Studies. 10 (2): 247–265. doi:10.1080/17531055.2016.1180825. hdl:20.500.11820/4f793aaf-2ebf-41cb-b320-6c312a886bfe. ISSN 1753-1055. S2CID 148400038. Archived from the original on 10 February 2023.
- Elliot, Ashley; Holzer, Georg-Sebastian (2009). "The Invention of 'Terrorism' in Somalia: Paradigms and Policy in US Foreign Relations". South African Journal of International Affairs. 16 (2): 215–244. doi:10.1080/10220460903268984. ISSN 1022-0461. S2CID 153568298.
- Grobbelaar, Alta (2022). "Media and Terrorism in Africa: Al-Shabaab's Evolution from Militant Group to Media Mogul". Insight on Africa. 15: 7–22. doi:10.1177/09750878221114375. ISSN 0975-0878. S2CID 251353970.
- Ingiriis, Mohamed Haji (2018a). "From Al-Itihaad to Al-Shabaab: How the Ethiopian Intervention and the 'War on Terror' Exacerbated the Conflict in Somalia". Third World Quarterly. 39 (11): 2033–2052. doi:10.1080/01436597.2018.1479186. ISSN 0143-6597. S2CID 158246584. Archived from the original on 11 September 2022.
- Ingiriis, Mohamed Haji (2018b). "The Invention of Al-Shabaab in Somalia: Emulating the Anti-Colonial Dervishes Movement". African Affairs. 117 (467): 217–237. doi:10.1093/afraf/ady001. ISSN 0001-9909. Archived from the original on 9 September 2022.
- Lahoud, Nelly (2012). "The Merger of Al-Shabab and Qa'idat al-Jihad". CTC Sentinel. 5 (2). Archived from the original on 10 September 2022.
- Levy, Ido; Yusuf, Abdi (2021). "How Do Terrorist Organizations Make Money? Terrorist Funding and Innovation in the Case of Al-Shabaab". Studies in Conflict & Terrorism. 44 (12): 1167–1189. doi:10.1080/1057610X.2019.1628622. ISSN 1057-610X. S2CID 197446421.
- Mair, David (2 January 2017). "#Westgate: A Case Study: How Al-Shabaab used Twitter during an Ongoing Attack". Studies in Conflict & Terrorism. 40 (1): 24–43. doi:10.1080/1057610X.2016.1157404. ISSN 1057-610X. S2CID 112132308. Archived from the original on 10 September 2022.
- Menkhaus, Ken (2014). "Al-Shabaab and Social Media: A Double-Edged Sword". The Brown Journal of World Affairs. 20 (2): 309–327. ISSN 1080-0786. JSTOR 24590990.
- Molony, Thomas (2019). "Social Media Warfare and Kenya's Conflict with Al Shabaab in Somalia: A Right to Know?". African Affairs. 118 (471): 328–351. doi:10.1093/afraf/ady035. hdl:20.500.11820/75a5d849-2236-480d-a497-4b552e86fc35. ISSN 0001-9909. Archived from the original on 21 April 2021.
- Mueller, Jason C. (2018). "The Evolution of Political Violence: The Case of Somalia's Al-Shabaab". Terrorism and Political Violence. 30 (1): 116–141. doi:10.1080/09546553.2016.1165213. ISSN 0954-6553. S2CID 148494845.
- Muibu, Daisy (2017). "Foreign Technology or Local Expertise? Al-Shabaab's IED Capability". CTC Sentinel. 10 (10). Archived from the original on 10 September 2022.
- Onat, Ismail; Guler, Ahmet; Hsu, Henda Y.; Reyes, Jessica (2021). "A VAR Analysis of the Effects of Al-Shabaab's Pledge to al-Qaeda on Bombings and Fatalities". Journal of Policing, Intelligence and Counter Terrorism. 16 (3): 283–301. doi:10.1080/18335330.2021.1953115. ISSN 1833-5330. S2CID 237772442.
- Petrich, Katharine (2022). "Cows, Charcoal, and Cocaine: Al-Shabaab's Criminal Activities in the Horn of Africa". Studies in Conflict & Terrorism. 45 (5–6): 479–500. doi:10.1080/1057610X.2019.1678873. ISSN 1057-610X. S2CID 208835514. Archived from the original on 10 September 2022.
- Skjelderup, Michael (2014). "Hudūd Punishments in the Forefront: Application of Islamic Criminal Law by Harakat Al-Shabaab al-Mujahideen". Journal of Law and Religion. 29 (2): 317–329. doi:10.1017/jlr.2014.11. ISSN 0748-0814. JSTOR 24739145.
- Skjelderup, Michael (2020). "Jihadi Governance and Traditional Authority Structures: Al-Shabaab and Clan Elders in Southern Somalia, 2008–2012". Small Wars & Insurgencies. 31 (6): 1174–1195. doi:10.1080/09592318.2020.1780686. hdl:11250/2823605. ISSN 0959-2318. S2CID 221158513.
- Solomon, Hussein (2014). "Somalia's Al-Shabaab: Clans vs Islamist nationalism". South African Journal of International Affairs. 21 (3): 351–366. doi:10.1080/10220461.2014.967286. ISSN 1022-0461. S2CID 153592166.
- Thomas, Matthew J. (2013). "Exposing and Exploiting Weaknesses in the Merger of al-Qaeda and Al-Shabaab". Small Wars & Insurgencies. 24 (3): 413–435. doi:10.1080/09592318.2013.802611. ISSN 0959-2318. S2CID 143419941.
- Vidino, Lorenzo; Pantucci, Raffaello; Kohlmann, Evan (2010). "Bringing Global Jihad to the Horn of Africa: al Shabaab, Western Fighters, and the Sacralization of the Somali Conflict". African Security. 3 (4): 216–238. doi:10.1080/19392206.2010.533071. ISSN 1939-2206. S2CID 144501155.
- Warner, Jason; Weiss, Caleb (2017). "A Legitimate Challenger? Assessing the Rivalry between Al-Shabaab and the Islamic State in Somalia". CTC Sentinel. 10 (10). Archived from the original on 10 September 2022.
- Weiss, Caleb (2019). "Reigniting the Rivalry: The Islamic State in Somalia vs. Al-Shabaab". CTC Sentinel. 12 (4). Archived from the original on 10 September 2022.
- Williams, Paul D. (2014). "After Westgate: Opportunities and Challenges in the War Against Al-Shabaab". International Affairs. 90 (4): 907–923. doi:10.1111/1468-2346.12147. ISSN 0020-5850. JSTOR 24538204.

=== Reports ===
- Bacon, Tricia (2022). "Inside the Minds of Somalia's Ascendant Insurgents" (PDF). Report of the George Washington University Program on Extremism. Archived (PDF) from the original on 29 September 2022.
- Bahadur, Jay (17 September 2020). "Following the Money: The Use of the Hawala Remittance System in the Yemen–Somalia Arms Trade". Report of the Global Initiative Against Transnational Organized Crime. Archived from the original on 5 December 2021.
- Barnett, James (28 May 2020). "The Evolution of East African Salafi-jihadism". Report of the Hudson Institute. Archived from the original on 11 September 2022.
- Bryden, Matt (8 December 2006). "Washington's Self-Defeating Somalia Policy". Center for Strategic and International Studies Africa Policy Forum Briefing. Archived from the original on 8 January 2007.
- Bryden, Matt (2014). "The Reinvention of Al-Shabaab: A Strategy of Choice or Necessity?" (PDF). Report of the Center for Strategic and International Studies. Archived (PDF) from the original on 8 September 2022.
- Byman, Daniel (2012). "Breaking the Bonds between Al-Qa'ida and Its Affiliate Organizations" (PDF). Report of the Brookings Institution. Archived (PDF) from the original on 10 August 2022.
- Chonka, Peter (2016b). "What You Need to Know to Understand Al-Shabaab". Report of the Tony Blair Institute for Global Change. Archived from the original on 9 September 2022.
- Dathan, Jennifer (25 May 2017). "Sources of Funding: Al-Shabaab". Action on Armed Violence Report. Archived from the original on 9 September 2022.
- Felbab-Brown, Vanda (19 June 2017). "Puntland's problems". Brookings Institution. Archived from the original on 10 September 2022.
- Felter, Claire; Masters, Jonathan; Sergie, Mohammed Aly (10 January 2020). "Backgrounder: Al-Shabab". Council on Foreign Relations Briefing. Archived from the original on 2 February 2021.
- Global Interagency Security Forum (23 March 2016). "The Resurgence of Al-Shabaab in Somalia and Implications for the Humanitarian Sector". Global Interagency Security Forum Briefing. Archived from the original on 28 October 2018.
- Harrington, Jake (23 September 2021). "Examining Extremism: Harakat al Shabaab al Mujahideen (al Shabaab)". Center for Strategic and International Studies Briefing. Archived from the original on 29 December 2021.
- Horton, Michael (10 March 2017). "Al-Shabaab: Why Somalia's al-Qaeda Affiliate Wants Puntland". Jamestown Foundation. Archived from the original on 10 September 2022.
- "Considering Political Engagement with Al-Shabaab in Somalia". Africa Report. No. 309. International Crisis Group. 21 June 2022. Archived from the original on 12 September 2022.
- Jackson, Ashley; Aynte, Abdi (2013). "Al-Shabaab Engagement with Aid Agencies" (PDF). Overseas Development Institute Policy Brief. 53. Archived (PDF) from the original on 1 September 2022.
- Jackson, Ashley (18 March 2014). "Humanitarian Negotiations with Armed Non-State Actors: Key Lessons from Afghanistan, Sudan and Somalia". Overseas Development Institute Policy Brief. 55. Archived from the original on 11 September 2022.
- Jones, Seth G.; Liepman, Andrew; Chandler, Nathan (13 September 2016). "Counterterrorism and Counterinsurgency in Somalia: Assessing the Campaign Against Al-Shabaab". Report of the Rand Corporation. Archived from the original on 9 September 2022.
- Lulie, Hallelujah (18 March 2013). "The Threat of the 'Unholy Trinity'". Institute for Security Studies Briefing. Archived from the original on 10 September 2022.
- Mubarak, Mohamed (2018). "Taming the Clans: Al-Shabab's Clan Politics". Report of the Hiraal Institute. Archived from the original on 10 September 2022.
- Roble, Muhyadin Ahmed (22 December 2011). "The Twitter War: A New Battleground for Kenya and Al-Shabaab". Jamestown Foundation. 9 (47). Archived from the original on 11 September 2022.
- Schaefer, Alan (2011). "Clan and Conflict in Somalia: Al-Shabaab and the Myth of 'Transcending Clan Politics'". Jamestown Foundation Terrorism Monitor. 9 (40). Archived from the original on 9 September 2022.
- Shinn, David (2010). "Al-Shabaab Tries to Take Control in Somalia". Foreign Policy Research Institute Briefing. Archived from the original on 6 January 2011.
- "Report on Somalia of the Monitoring Group on Somalia and Eritrea". United Nations. Report S/2017/924. 2 November 2017. Archived from the original on 27 September 2020.
- "Report on Somalia of the Monitoring Group on Somalia and Eritrea". United Nations. 9 November 2018. Archived from the original on 11 April 2020.
- "Final Report of the Panel of Experts on Somalia". United Nations. 1 November 2019. Archived from the original on 21 June 2020.
- "Extending Arms Embargoes on Somalia, Eritrea, Security Council Adopts Resolution 2385 (2017)". United Nations Security Council. 14 November 2017. Archived from the original on 10 September 2022.
