= Mahad Karate =

Deputy emir of Al-Shabaab

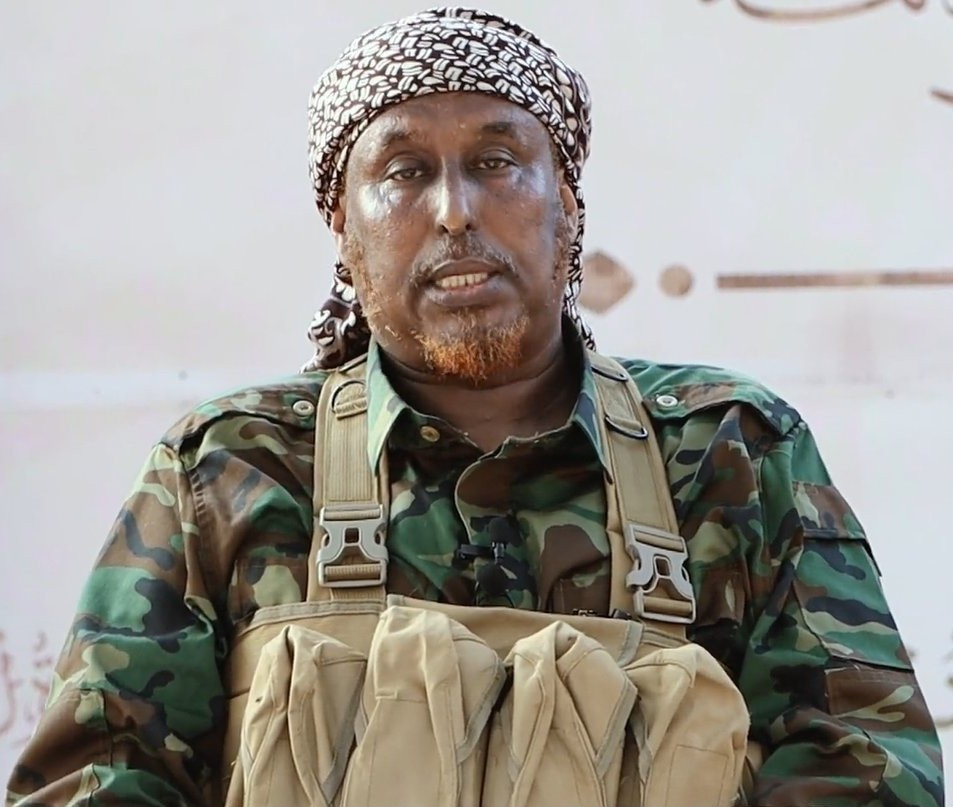
- Mahad Karate speaking at a graduation ceremony for new Al-Shabaab recruits in January 2024

Deputy Emir of Al-Shabaab

Personal details
- Born: Between 1957 and 1962 (69 or 64 age) Xarardheere, Mudug, Somalia

Military service
- Allegiance: (Somalia) National Security Service (1987–1991); Al-Itihaad al-Islamiya (1991–1997); Al-Qaeda: Al-Shabaab
- Rank: Head of the Aminayat (Al-Shabaab intelligence)
- Battles/wars: Somali Civil War: War in Somalia

Abdirahman Mohamed Warsame (born between 1957 and 1962), known by his nom de guerre Mahad Karate, is the deputy emir of Al-Shabaab and the leader of Al-Shabaab's intelligence service, the Amniyat.

== Early life ==
Mahad Karate was born as Abdirahman Mohamed Warsame between 1957 and 1962 in the town of Xarardheere in the Mudug region, Somalia. He is a member of the Hawiye clan. Before he joined Al-Shabaab and before the Somali Rebellion, Mahad was a member of the Somali intelligence service of the revolutionary government. He later joined Al-Itihaad al-Islamiya after the Somali Rebellion before joining al-Shabaab He speaks Somali, Arabic and basic Swahili.

== Militant Career ==
=== Al-Shabaab ===
Karate was a member of Al-Shabaab's security and financial unit until he was considered the new leader of Al-Shabaab with Ahmad Diriye, though Ahmad Diriye was chosen for it, he became the deputy emir. Due to this, an inter-conflict arose with supporters of Karate and supporters of Diriye having disputes with each other and armed conflicts, with one example being a 2023 conflict between a pro-Karate faction against a pro-Dirie faction in Jilib and Hargeisa-Yarey settlement in Middle Juba, about 400 kilometres (248 miles) south of Mogadishu.

The Amniyat, al-Shabaab's intelligence and security wing, has been instrumental in conducting suicide attacks and assassinations throughout Somalia and neighboring countries, including Kenya. Under the leadership of Karate, the Amniyat orchestrated the April 2, 2015, attack on Garissa University College in Kenya. This devastating assault, which deliberately targeted Christian students and resulted in the deaths of 150 people, remains al-Shabaab's deadliest operation in Kenya. After this operation, the United States Department of Defense designated Karate as a Specially Designated Global Terrorist (SDGT) in response to the attack and later, on November 11, 2015, offered $5 million for any information leading to the arrest or death of Karate. Even after the designation, Karate remained in command and directed Amniyat attacks throughout Somalia. In January 2016, the Amniyat, under his leadership, ambushed a Kenyan army base in El Adde, Somalia, killing over 100 soldiers.

In February 2016, media reports surfaced claiming that Mahad Karate and 50 other militants had been killed in a Kenyan airstrike targeting an Amniyat training camp. However, al-Shabaab denied the strike, and a Somali intelligence source expressed doubts about Karate's death. After reports of his possible death, media sources offered little information on Karate's activities until February 26, 2021, when the United Nations Security Council placed him on its sanctions list for his role in al-Shabaab.

In May 2022, Mahad Karate was interviewed by the United Kingdom broadcasting network Channel 4. During the interview, he discussed the incompatibility of Islam and democracy, stating: “the truth is, on this earth, nobody has achieved their principles, systems, and administration by being peaceful... Democracy is a religion for non-Muslims. It's against our beliefs and identity. We are Muslims. Islam and democracy cannot be compatible.”.

In 2022, the United States announced rewards of up to $10 million each for information leading to the identification of three key Al-Shabaab figures: emir Ahmed Diriye, second-in-command Mahad Karate, and US citizen Jehad Mostafa, who held various roles within the group. The bounty was doubled from the $5 million a few years earlier.
