= Ido Levy =

Ido Levy may refer to:

- Ido Levy (footballer)
- Ido Levy (author)
