= Ahmed Diriye =

Second leader of Al-Shabaab (2014-present)

Ahmad Diriye
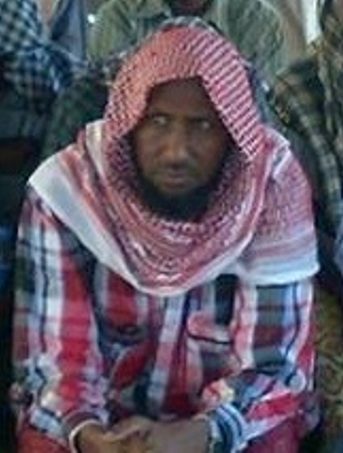
- Image of Diriye taken from the U.S. State Department

3rd Emir of al-Shabaab
- Incumbent
- Assumed office 6 September 2014
- Preceded by: Ahmed Abdi Godane

Personal details
- Born: Ahmad Umar; 1972 (age 53–54) Mustahil, Ethiopia
- Known for: Leader of al-Shabaab
- Nickname(s): Sheikh Ahmad Umar Abu Ubaidah, Sheikh Omar Abu Ubaidaha, Sheikh Ahmed Umar, Sheikh Mahad Omar Abdikarim, Abu Ubaidah, Abu Diriye, Diriye

Military service
- Battles/wars: Somali Civil War; War in Somalia (2006–2009); Somali Civil War (2009–present)

Ahmed Diriye (Somali: Axmed Diiriye, Arabic: أحمد ديريه; born 1972), also known as Ahmad Umar or Abu Ubaidah al-Somali (Arabic: أبي عبيدة الصومالي), is the Emir of Somalia’s Islamist militant group Al-Shabaab.

Diriye became head of the organization following the death of al-Shabaab's leader Ahmed Godane in 2014. In 2022, the U.S. State Department designated him a terrorist.

== History ==
Ahmad Diriye was born in 1972 in Mustahil in the Hararghe province of Ethiopia. He is believed to be in his fifties and is a member of the Bijamal subclan of the Dir clan. According to Africa Confidential he is a cousin of Ahmed Abdi Godane.

Diriye was a member of Al-Ittihad al-Islamiyya since 1996 and later served as an officer in the Islamic Courts Union. He headed a Quranic school in Kismayo. Diriye served in several positions within al-Shabaab following the Ethiopian invasion of Somalia in 2006.

Diriye was one of the founding members of al-Shabaab and a close relative of Godane whom he became his assistant. He was the 'founding father' of the groups intelligence service, Amniyat. During 2008, he served as the deputy governor of Lower Juba region, and was later appointed al-Shabaab's governor of Bay and Bakool regions on 29 June 2009.

In January 2012 Diriye was appointed as transitional military commander of Bay, Bakool and Gedo regions. By 2013, he was a senior adviser to Godane and served in al-Shabaab's "Interior Department," where he oversaw the group's domestic activity. It is speculated that Umar influenced Godane's decision to purge the group's foreign fighters in 2012-2013, and he is also credited with leading the contingent that killed Al-Amriki. According to the U.S. State Department, he shares Godane's vision for al-Shabaab's terrorist attacks in Somalia as an element of al-Qa’ida's greater global aspirations.

=== Emir of al-Shabaab (2014–present) ===
Diriye was named al-Shabaab leader in September 2014, after Godane was killed by a U.S. airstrike. Though picked by Godane loyalists, Diriye immediately reached out to insurgent leaders who had been alienated by his leadership, such as Fuad Qalaf and released dozens of Shabaab commanders who had been previously imprisoned under Godane. He began an internal reconciliation process in an attempt to bridge serious divisions that occurred in the previous years. Abdukadir Mohamed Abdukadir unsuccessfully pressured Diriye to switch the groups allegiance from Al-Qaeda to the Islamic State of Iraq and Syria during the latter groups rapid rise in 2014. Following his accession to emir, Diriye reiterated the al-Shabaab's allegiance to Al-Qaeda.

He first appeared publicly as leader of al-Shabaab in a 2019 video about an attack on the Baledogle Airfield, from which American troops in Somalia operate.

In early November 2024, Diriye released a 45-minute speech condemning Ethiopia’s push for naval access to Somalia’s coast and claimed that Ethiopia is in the final stages of preparing to seize Somalia’s waters. He called for the removal of Somali President Hassan Sheikh Mohamud and other regional leaders, accusing them of welcoming Ethiopia in Mogadishu, Baidoa, Garowe, and Hargeisa. Diriye stated these leaders had also recognized the Somali Region (which includes the Ogaden) as Ethiopian territory. Finally he called on young people across the Horn of Africa to take up arms with al-Shabaab against Ethiopia.

== See also ==
- List of fugitives from justice who disappeared
