= Jaysh Ayman =

Salafi jihadist group

Jaysh Ayman (Arabic: جيش أيمن)
- Flag of Jaysh Ayman
- Leaders: Maalim Ayman; Abdifatah Abubakar Abdi
- Dates active: 2013 – Present
- Active regions: Boni Forrest; Nairobi; Lamu County; Mandera County; Wajir County; Garissa County
- Ideology: Salafi jihadism Islamic fundamentalism
- Size: ≈300 fighters
- Part of: al-Shabaab
- Wars: the Somali Civil War Insurgency in northern Kenya

Jaysh Ayman (Arabic: جيش أيمن), also known as al-Hijra (Arabic: الهجرة), is a Salafi jihadist group consisting of both Swahili-speaking foreign fighters and fighters from Somalia that has been active in Kenya against the government in northern Kenya. The group is an affiliate of al-Shabaab and its leader is Maalim Ayman.
