= Anti-Kenyan sentiment =

Prejudice, discrimination and hostility against Kenya, its people and government

Anti-Kenyan sentiment refers to prejudice, discrimination, or hostility against Kenya and its people. It has been most prominently observed in neighboring Somalia, where Kenya's military involvement has generated nationalist and militant opposition. It has also appeared in other African countries in the form of xenophobic violence targeting Kenyan migrants and businesses.

== Scope ==
=== Somalia ===
Historical tensions between Somalia and Kenya have been shaped in part by the colonial-era partition of the Northern Frontier District and the subsequent Shifta War (1963–1967), providing a backdrop for Somali political sensitivities concerning Kenya's role in the region. Following the 1991 collapse of the Somali state, these tensions were compounded by the humanitarian crisis and the influx of refugees into Kenya. Security measures directed at Somalis in Kenya, including identity-screening initiatives and reported harassment, became a further source of tension in relations with the Kenyan state. Tensions intensified after Kenya launched Operation Linda Nchi in southern Somalia in October 2011, which, despite being framed as a response to cross-border insecurity, generated criticism regarding foreign military involvement and Kenya's influence in Jubaland's political developments. Al-Shabaab, a group designated as a terrorist organization by numerous international bodies and states, has also invoked Kenya's military presence in its propaganda to justify attacks such as the Westgate shopping mall attack and the Garissa University College attack, though this messaging represents the position of a non-state militant group rather than Somali public opinion as a whole.

=== South Africa ===
Kenyans living and working in South Africa have periodically been affected by waves of xenophobic violence targeting foreign nationals. In 2026, renewed outbreaks of anti-migrant attacks led the Kenyan government to evacuate dozens of its citizens. Reports indicated that Kenyans, along with nationals from other African countries, faced threats, looting of businesses, and physical violence amid campaigns by groups advocating stricter immigration enforcement.

Kenya's High Commission in Pretoria assisted in the repatriation of affected citizens, with over 200 Kenyans registering for evacuation assistance during the height of the violence.

=== Other countries ===
Limited reports of anti-Kenyan sentiment have surfaced in other parts of East Africa, particularly in areas with significant cross-border movement. In parts of Zanzibar, for example, local politicians have occasionally stoked resentment over economic competition and porous borders. However, these incidents remain sporadic and less organized compared to those in Somalia and South Africa.

== See also ==
- Afrophobia
- Anti-Ethiopian sentiment
- Anti-Somali sentiment
- Xenophobia in South Africa
- Kenya–Somalia relations
- Operation Linda Nchi
- Al-Shabaab
