= Abdukadir Mohamed Abdukadir =

Somali terrorist

Abdikadir Mohamed Abdikadir
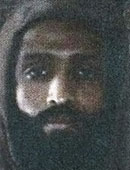
- Born: 1979 (age 46–47) or 1985 (age 40–41); Somalia or Kenya
- Other names: Abdukadir Mohamed Abdukadir; Abdulkadir Mohamed Abdulkadir; Ikrima
- Citizenship: Kenya
- Organization: Al-Shabaab
- Title: Senior leader; has served as the Head of Operations and Logistics
- Reward amount: up to $3 million
- Wanted by: US Department of State
- Wanted since: 2014

Notes
- https://rewardsforjustice.net/rewards/abdikadir-mohamed-abdikadir/

Abdikadir Mohamed Abdikadir (born 1979 or 1985), better known as Ikrima, is an Islamist militant described as one of the most dangerous commanders of the Somali radical jihadist organisation Al-Shabaab. He has reportedly been central in the planning of several terror attacks, and responsible for forging links between Al-Shabaab and Al-Qaeda in the Arabian Peninsula (AQAP).

In 2014 the United States Department of State offered a reward of up to 3 million US dollars for information leading to his arrest. On August 6, 2021, the U.S. Department of State designated Abdikadir as a Specially Designated Global Terrorist.

== Activities ==
Born in Somalia or Kenya, Abdikadir is thought to have been associated with the planners of the 1998 United States embassy bombings in Kenya, and of involvement with the 2002 Mombasa attacks. He lived in Norway as an asylum seeker from 2004 to 2008 in the town of Moelv, where he received Norwegian travel documents. He thereafter lived in the United Kingdom for about a year. He is reported to speak several languages, including English, Somali, Swahili, French, Norwegian and some Arabic.

He has allegedly been involved in several terror plots in Kenya, including a plot targeting the Mandera Airport in April 2013, a 2011 plot of training youth to become terrorists, and Al-Qaeda-sanctioned plots of attacks in 2011 and 2012 against the Kenyan parliament, United Nations offices in Nairobi and Kenyan politicians. It has been speculated that he may have been involved in the planning of the 2013 Westgate shopping mall attack, notably as one of the perpetrators, Hassan Abdi Dhuhulow was a Norwegian citizen of Somali origin.

Ikrima was the target of the unsuccessful October 2013 raid on Barawe by US Navy SEALs in the town of Barawa in Somalia.
