= Stig Jarle Hansen =

Norwegian political scientist, historian

- Born: 1971 (age 54–55); Horten
- Occupations: Political scientist and historian

Stig Jarle Hansen (born 1971 in Horten) is a Norwegian political scientist and historian. He is a professor at the Norwegian University of Life Sciences. Hansen is a specialist in jihadist and Islamist groups in Africa, and provided commentary on the topic for BBC, Al Jazeera, CNN and the Dutch state channel Kanal 4 (CCTV4). He has spoken on the Yemeni civil war and Yemen in general on Dutch broadcasting. Hansen published Al Shabaab in Somalia (Oxford University Press, New York) in 2013.

Hansen received the cand.polit. degree in political science at the University of Oslo in 1999. In 2004, he completed a major in history at the University of Oslo. Hansen graduated in 2006 with a PhD degree at University of Wales Aberystwyth. He has previously lectured on political science at the University of Addis Ababa, at the University of Wales, and at the University of Bath. From 2009 to 2016, he was head international relations at the Department of International Environmental and Development Studies at the Norwegian University of Life Sciences. Hansen was a fellow at the Belfer Center at Harvard University.

Hansen specializes in security policy relating to the Horn of Africa. He wrote for the Janes Defense group in the period 2006 to 2011. In 2016, he contributed articles to Newsweek. He has served as a witness in Norwegian, British and German trials with regard to jihadist extremists. Hansen is a member of the international expert council of Norwegian Risk Consulting International.
