= Insight on Africa =

- Discipline: Development studies
- Language: English
- Edited by: Ajay Kumar Dubey, Bijay K Pratihari and Hussein Solomon

Publication details
- History: 2013
- Publisher: SAGE Publications (India)
- Frequency: Biannual

Standard abbreviations
- ISO 4: Insight Afr.

Indexing
- ISSN: 0975-0878 (print); 0976-3465 (web)

Links
- Journal homepage; Online access; Online archive

Insight on Africa: A Journal of Contemporary African Affairs is a refereed journal that provides a forum for discussion on foreign policies and developmental issues of African countries.

It is published twice a year by SAGE Publications in association with African Studies Association of India.

== Abstracting and indexing ==
Insight on Africa is abstracted and indexed in:

- J-Gate
