= Jehad Mostafa =

American member of al-Shabaab

Jehad Serwan Mostafa
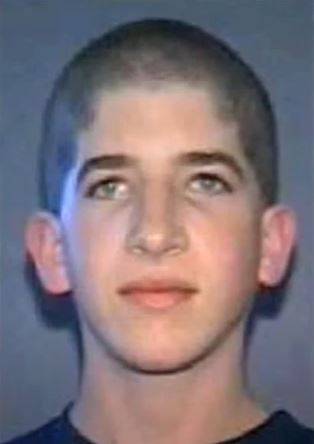
- Kehad Mostafa as a youth (undated)
- Born: December 28, 1981 (age 44); Waukesha, Wisconsin, U.S.
- Other names: Emir Anwar, Ahmed Gurey, Anwar al-Amriki, Ahmed, Anwar, Abu Abdullah al-Muhajir
- Known for: Highest ranking U.S. citizen in a foreign terrorist organization, senior leader in al-Shabaab
- Criminal charges: Conspiracy to provide material support to terrorists; conspiracy to provide material support to a Foreign Terrorist Organization; providing material support to a Foreign Terrorist Organization (1 count each)
- Children: 16

Jehad Serwan Mostafa (Arabic: جهاد سيروان مصطفى; born December 28, 1981), also known as Anwar al-Amriki (Arabic: أنور الأمريكي), is an American-born senior leader in al-Shabaab, the al-Qaida affiliate in Somalia. Mostafa has been on the FBI Most Wanted Terrorists list since 2011, as per his significance to multiple terrorist cells, and is believed to be the highest ranking U.S. citizen in a foreign terrorist organization.

== Early life ==
Jehad Serwan Mostafa was born on December 28, 1981, in Waukesha, Wisconsin to Halim Mostafa Gabori (died 2018), a Kurd from Syria, and an American mother. He was raised in Serra Mesa, California, and earned a degree in economics at the University of California, San Diego in 2005.

In his youth, he served as the head of the Muslim Youth Council of San Diego and became a security guard registered with the California Bureau of Security and Investigative Services by 2000. During his time in San Diego, he was described as "very kind, very peaceful, very patient" and as "not scary or aggressive".

== Involvement with terrorism ==
Mostafa married a Somali woman in 2005; and, that same year, departed from the United States. At the age of 23, he traveled to Sana'a, Yemen, and then to Somalia by 2006, where he engaged in fighting alongside the Islamic Courts Union seeking to expel Ethiopian troops from Somali territory. He then joined al-Shabaab, which was designated a Foreign Terrorist Organization by the U.S. State Department in 2008.

Mostafa swiftly ascended through al-Shabaab's ranks, allegedly serving not only as an explosives expert, but as, furthermore, a propaganda expert, military instructor, and interpreter. By 2009, he has been considered a senior leader in al-Shabaab, and is believed to be the highest-ranking U.S. citizen in a foreign terrorist organization.

In 2011, Mostafa appeared at an al-Shabaab press conference with al-Shabaab leadership.

He reportedly has three wives in Somalia–one of which being a widow of a deceased al-Shabaab member–and an estimated sixteen children. In a 2018 ground operation, Mostafa narrowly avoided capture.

== Criminal charges ==
On October 9, 2009, Mostafa was charged by the United States government with:

- Conspiracy to provide material support to terrorists
- Conspiracy to provide material support to a Foreign Terrorist Organization
- Providing material support to a Foreign Terrorist Organization.

In 2011, Mostafa was added to the FBI Most Wanted Terrorists, and in 2013 the U.S. government offered a $5 million bounty under the Rewards for Justice (RFJ) program for information leading to his arrest and conviction. In 2022, U.S. government doubled the RFJ payment amount for information about Mostafa to $10 million.
