= Matthew Bryden =

Canadian political analyst

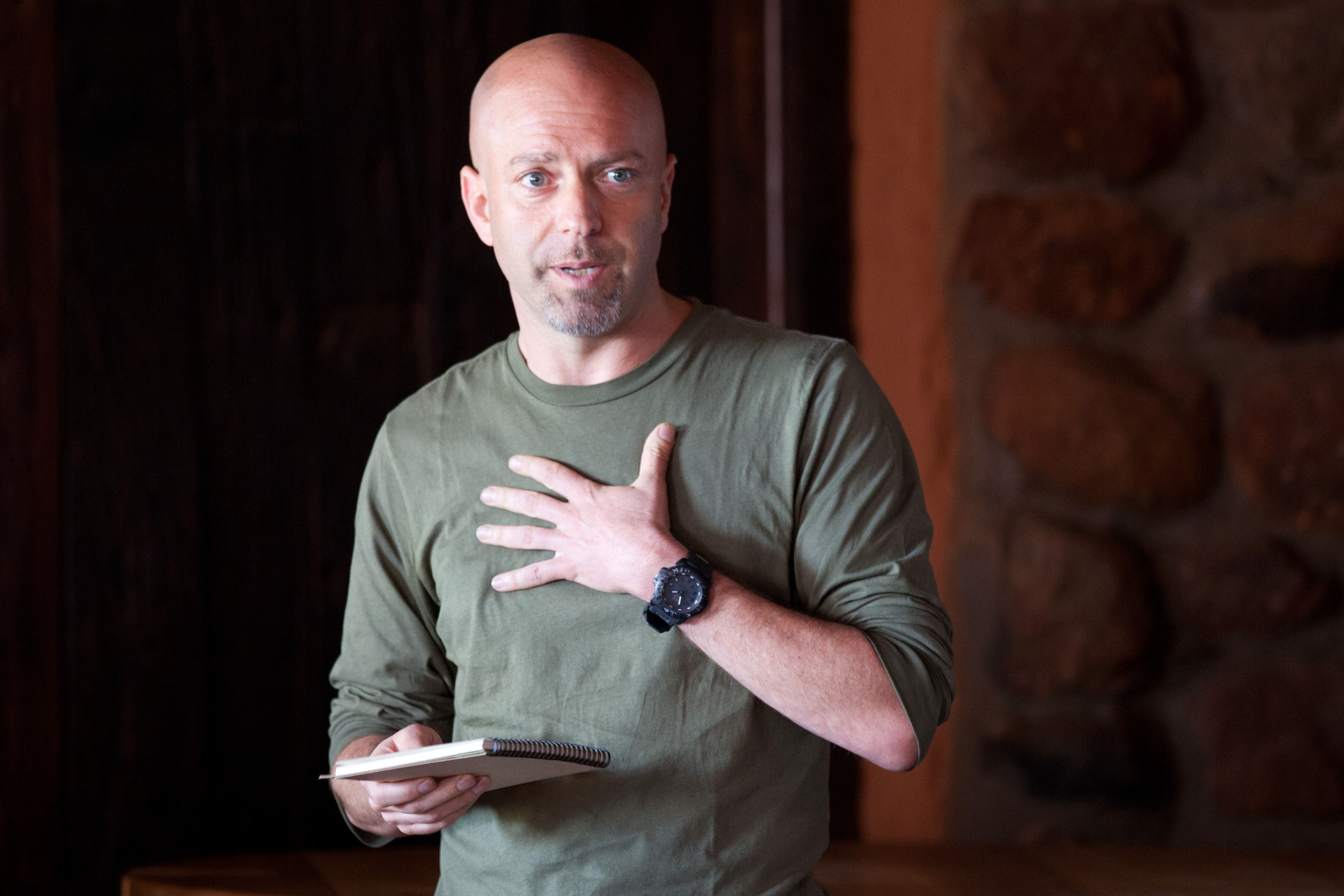
- Born: 1964/1965; United Kingdom
- Other name: Matt Bryden
- Education: Upper Canada College; King's College London
- Occupation: Strategic Advisor at Sahan
- Known for: Horn of Africa political analysis, expert on Somalia

Matthew Bryden is a Canadian political analyst active in the Horn of Africa. He worked for several aid and political organizations in Somalia after spending some time in the region during his leave from the Canadian military in 1987. He served as the Coordinator for the Monitoring Group Eritrea (EMG) from 2008 to 2012. He is a founder of Sahan, also known as Sahan Research, a think tank focused on the Horn of Africa region. He has also been described in the past as the director of the that organization, which is based in Nairobi.

== Early life ==
Matthew Bryden was born in the UK and grew up in Canada. He attended Upper Canada College in Toronto, where he graduated in 1985. Bryden joined the Canadian Forces Reserve and became interested in African aid programs after visiting the region during a military leave in 1987.

== Career ==
He was hired by the Cooperative for Assistance and Relief Everywhere (CARE) program in January 1988 and the following year he joined the United Nations Development Program (UNDP) in Berbera, Somalia. He was reassigned to Nairobi, Kenya in August 1990, when the UN evacuated non-essential staff.

In 1992, Bryden was appointed Special Advisor to the Canadian Ambassador on Somali Affairs. He led the War-torn Societies Project (WSP) from 1996 to 2003 and in the two years following acted as the Horn of Africa Director for the International Crisis Group (ICG). From 2007 to 2008, he served as an adviser on Somali affairs for the United States Agency for International Development USAID and the US embassy.

In 2008, Bryden was appointed Coordinator of the Monitoring Group on Somalia and Eritrea (SEMG), which monitored violations of the general and complete arms embargo introduced by United Nations Security Council Resolution 733 on 23 January 1992. This included reports that the United States violated the embargo when making anti-terrorist missile strikes, and an incident where two journalists were detained under suspicions of being mercenaries. Bryden said he considered any munitions delivered to Somalia to be a breach of the embargo.

Bryden accused then Puntland President Abdirahman Farole and other government officials of being on the payroll of pirate gangs. Abdirahman Farole in turn accused Bryden of using his position at the SEMG to create inflated reports of munitions in the neighboring regions of Somaliland in order to support his interest in the secession of Somaliland. He noted Bryden was married to a well-connected woman from the region's dominant Isaaq clan. Bryden stepped down from his SEMG position in mid-2012.

By 2015, Bryden was serving as director of Sahan Research, a Nairobi-based think tank of which he was also a founder. The think tank was described in 2018 as focused on Somalia, but would later describe itself as covering the Horn of Africa region in general. In December 2018, the Somali federal government's Ministry of Internal Security announced that it was banning Sahan Research from operating in the country, soon after Bryden was quoted in the Washington Post making comments critical of the government's approach to relations with its federal member states.

In April 2021 Bryden and four others were charged in Somalia with the crime of "leaking state secrets". That October, the federal-affiliated court of Banaadir region, located in Somali capital Mogadishu, sentenced Bryden in absentia to five years in prison after ruling that he was guilty of those charges, without having publicized the details of the accusations. The court also reaffirmed the national ban on Sahan Research. Sahan denied that Bryden was guilty of any crimes, calling the proceedings a "farcical, politically motivated show trial" and alleging that no evidence had been provided and no defense was allowed. In April 2024, Somalia's federal government was reported to be seeking Bryden's extradition from Kenya, after he made comments disparaging Somalia's governance and supporting Somaliland independence at a conference in Ethiopia.

== Personal life ==
As of 2010, Bryden lived in Nairobi, Kenya. Bryden is fluent in the Somali and French languages.

== Bibliography ==
- New hope for Somalia? The building block approach, 1999
- The Banana Test: Is Somaliland Ready for Recognition, 2003
- Somalia and Somaliland: Envisioning a dialogue on the question of Somali unity, 2004
- Rebuilding Somaliland: Issues and Possibilities, 2005
- Report of the United Nations Monitoring Group on Somalia and Eritrea Submitted in Accordance with Resolution 1916, 2010 (coauthor)
