= Ido Levy (author) =

American counter-terrorism expert (born 1996)

- עידו לוי
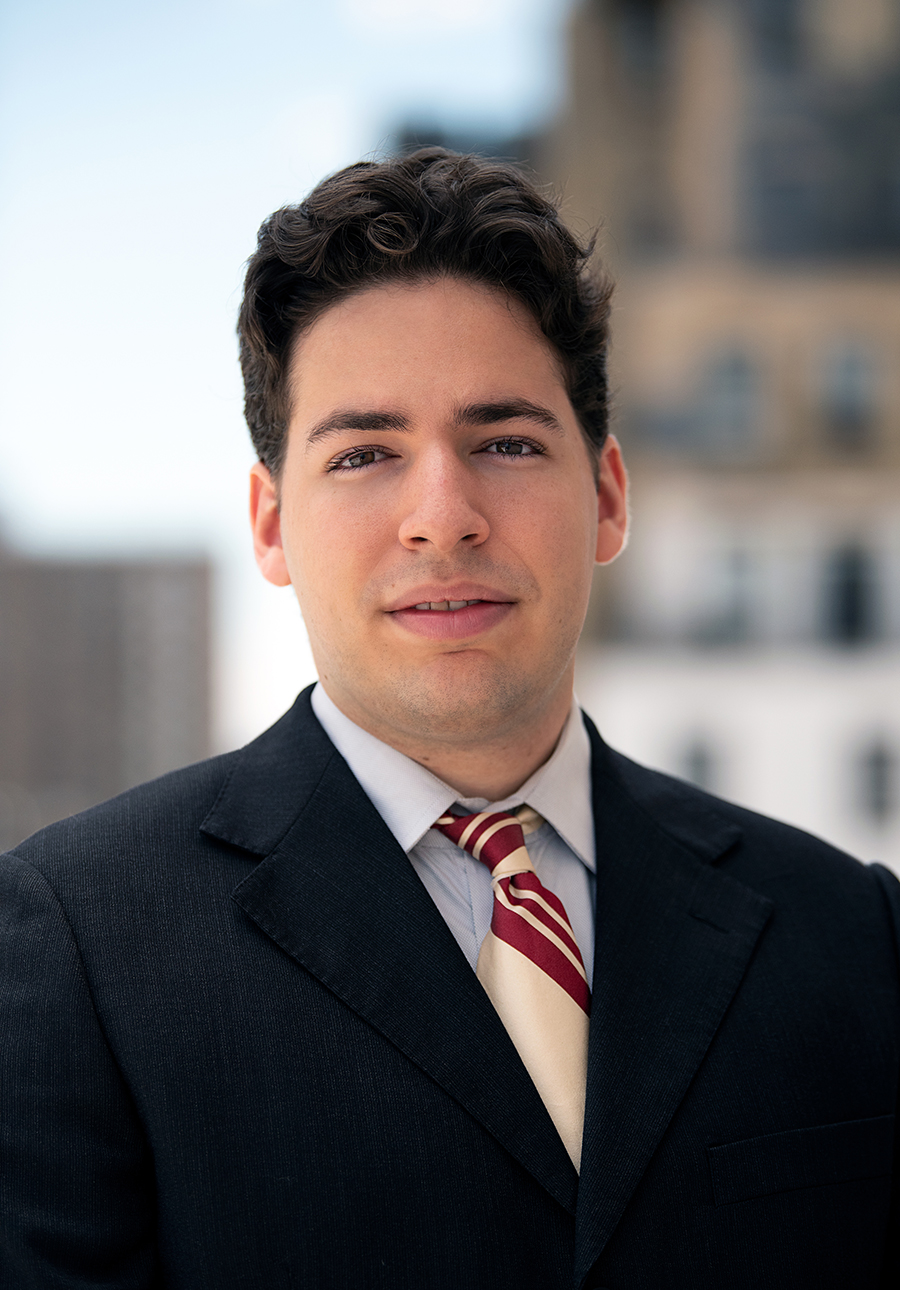
- Born: September 3, 1996 (age 28); New York City, U.S.
- Education: IDC Herzliya (BA); Georgetown University (MPP)

Ido Eliyahu Levy (Hebrew: עידו אליהו לוי; born September 3, 1996) is an American counter-terrorism expert and military analyst. Levy is an Associate Fellow at the Washington Institute for Near East Policy, where he authored the book "Soldiers of End-Times", a comprehensive analysis of the Islamic State's conventional warfare capabilities, published in December 2021.

== Biography ==
Levy attended IDC Herzliya (now Reichman University) in Israel between 2015 and 2018, where he received his B.A. in government, diplomacy, and strategy graduating summa cum laude. While in Israel, Levy researched radicalisation and deradicalisation programmes at the International Institute for Counter-Terrorism (ICT) and Iraqi political affairs at the Institute for National Security Studies (INSS). Between 2018 and 2020, Levy attended Georgetown University in Washington, D.C., receiving his MPP from the McCourt School of Public Policy. During his time at Georgetown, Levy conducted further research on Iraq and other countries in the Middle East at the Council on Foreign Relations, and on ideologies and lethality rates of terrorist groups at the START Consortium. Additionally, he was the editor-in-chief of the Georgetown Public Policy Review.

He contributed political and military analysis to Middle East Policy, Terrorism and Political Violence, Small Wars Journal, The Jerusalem Post, NBC and others.

Levy was born in New York City, where he attended high school at the Abraham Joshua Heschel School. A native Hebrew and English speaker, Levy gained fluency in Arabic in 2015, when he studied at Givat Haviva.

== Publications ==
- Levy, Ido. “Deradicalization Programs in Australia and the Foreign Fighter Phenomenon,” ICT (2018).
- Levy, Ido. “Prison Radicalization in Australia and the Returnee Threat: Assessing the Case of Goulburn Corrections Centre,” International Institute for Counter-Terrorism (ICT) (2018).
- Levy, Ido and Abdi Yusuf. “How do Terrorist Organizations Make Money? Terrorist Funding and Innovation in the Case of al- Shabaab,” Studies in Conflict & Terrorism, 44:12 (2019): 1167–1189.
- Levy, Ido. “Shia Militias and Exclusionary Politics in Iraq,” Middle East Policy, 26:3 (2019): 123–133.
- Levy, Ido. “Lethal Beliefs: Ideology and the Lethality of Terrorist Organizations,” Terrorism and Political Violence (2021).
- Levy, Ido and Abdi Yusuf. “The ‘Lightning’ Brigade: U.S. Security Force Assistance and Somali Military Effectiveness,” Studies in Conflict & Terrorism (December 2021).
- Levy, Ido. Soldiers of End-Times: Assessing the Military Effectiveness of the Islamic State (Washington, D.C.: The Washington Institute for Near East Policy, December 2021).

=== Analysis ===
- Levy, Ido. “Battle for al-Sinaa Prison: The Enduring Islamic State Threat in Syria,” The Washington Institute, January 31, 2022.
- Levy, Ido. “A Tale of Two Islamic State Insurgencies in Syria,” The Washington Institute, September 17, 2021.
- Levy, Ido. “Toward Understanding the Actions of the Islamic State and Other Jihadist Groups as Military Doctrine,” Small Wars Journal, January 24, 2019.
