= List of regions of Moldova by Human Development Index =

This is a list of Regions of Moldova by Human Development Index as of 2024.

Rank	Region	HDI (2023)
Very high human development
1	Chișinău	0.852
–	Transnistria (2022)	0.801
High human development
–	Moldova (average)	0.785
2	Southern Development Region	0.780
3	Northern Development Region	0.764
4	Central Development Region	0.760
