= NUTS of Moldova =

Overview of Moldovan NUTS statistical regions

The Nomenclature of Territorial Units for Statistics (NUTS) is a geographical standard used by Moldova in order to divide its territory into regions at three different levels of specified classes of its population codified by the National Bureau of Statistics of the Republic of Moldova (NBS). Moldova is a recognised candidate country for membership of the European Union (EU) and thus part of the classification. The three hierarchical levels are known as NUTS-1, NUTS-2 and NUTS-3, moving from larger to smaller territorial divisions.

== Overall ==
| Level | Division | # |
|---|---|---|
| NUTS 1 | Moldova | |
| NUTS 2 | Western part (the right side of Dniester) and Eastern part (left side of Dniester) | 2* |
| NUTS 3 | Six statistical regions: North, Center, South, Municipality of Chisinau, Autonomous Territorial Unit of Gagauzia and Administrative-territorial unit(s) of the left Bank of Dniester river | 6* |

* NUTS 2 and 3 levels have not yet been agreed.

== Regions ==
The NUTS codes are as follows:

| NUTS-1 | Code | NUTS-2 | Code | NUTS-3 | Code |
|---|---|---|---|---|---|
| Moldova | MD1 | | | | |
| Moldova | MD1 | West side (right side of Nistru River)) | MD11 | North Region | MD111 |
| Moldova | MD1 | West side (right side of Nistru River)) | MD11 | Center Region | MD112 |
| Moldova | MD1 | West side (right side of Nistru River)) | MD11 | South Region | MD113 |
| Moldova | MD1 | West side (right side of Nistru River)) | MD11 | Autonomous Territorial Unit Gagauzia | MD114 |
| Moldova | MD1 | West side (right side of Nistru River)) | MD11 | Municipality Chișinău | MD115 |
| Moldova | MD1 | The eastern part (the left side of the Nistru River) | MD12 | Administrative-territorial units on the left side of Nistru River | MD120 |
