= List of subnational entities with the highest and lowest Human Development Index =

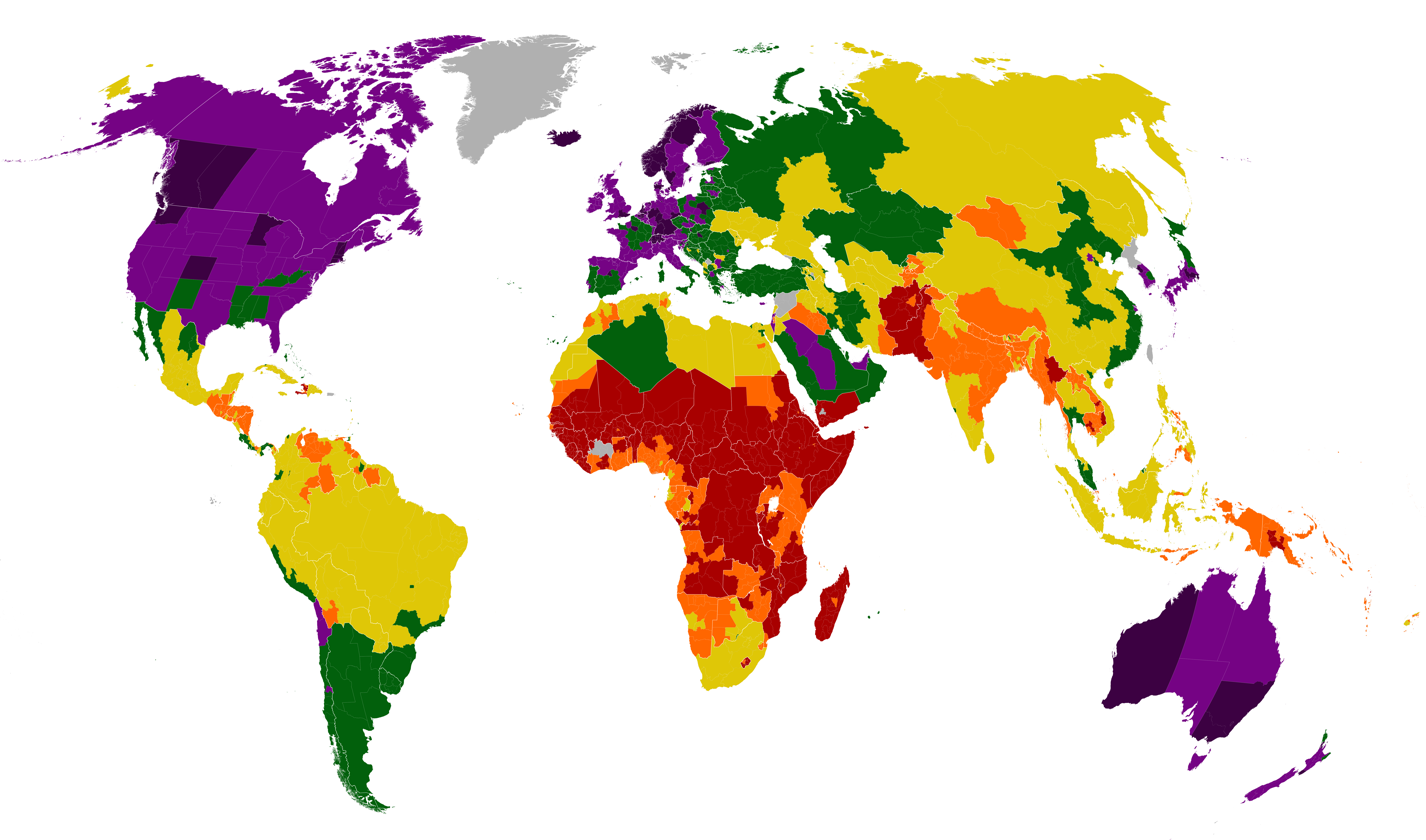
World map of subnational entities by HDI (2023). ≥0.950 0.900 – 0.949 0.800 – 0.899 0.700 – 0.799 0.550 – 0.699 <0.550

The following list shows the subnational entities and regions with the highest and lowest Human Development Index (HDI) in the world and on different continents. The HDI is a summary measure of human development that considers three dimensions: health, education, and standard of living. It is calculated by taking the geometric mean of three normalized indicators: life expectancy at birth, mean and expected years of schooling, and gross national income per capita. The HDI ranges from 0 to 1, with higher values indicating higher human development. The HDI itself was created by Pakistani economist Mahbub ul Haq in 1990, and was further used by the UNDP to measure the country's development in its annual Human Development Reports.The index was initially calculated at the country level. The Global Data Lab at Radboud University in the Netherlands launched a subnational HDI (SHDI) in 2018, which covers around 1,800 regions in over 160 countries to better reflect the differences within countries. Global Data Lab also provides the Subnational Human the Subnational Gender Development Index (SGDI) and data on income, years of education and life expectancy on the subnational level. The SHDI and SGDI are based on the UNDP's official HDI and GDI, but they use subnational data in addition to national data.

== Regions with the highest and lowest HDI ==
25 highest HDIs
The top 25 regions with the highest HDI in 2023 were:

Rank	Region	Country	HDI (2023)
Very high human development
1	Zurich	Switzerland	0.993
2	Australian Capital Territory	Australia	0.988
3	London	United Kingdom	0.982
3	Oslo and Akershus	Norway	0.982
5	Hamburg	Germany	0.977
5	Berlin	Germany	0.977
7	Stockholm County	Sweden	0.976
7	Lake Geneva region	Switzerland	0.976
9	Prague	Czech Republic	0.975
10	Western Norway	Norway	0.974
11	Western Australia	Australia	0.973
12	Baden-Württemberg	Germany	0.972
12	Iceland	Iceland	0.972
12	Trøndelag	Norway	0.972
15	Capital Region of Denmark	Denmark	0.971
16	Agder-Rogaland	Norway	0.970
17	Utrecht province	Netherlands	0.969
18	Helsinki-Uusimaa Region	Finland	0.967
18	Bavaria	Germany	0.967
18	Bratislava Region	Slovakia	0.967
21	Antwerp Province	Belgium	0.966
21	Central Slovenia	Slovenia	0.966
21	Capital Area (Gyeonggi, Seoul, Incheon)	South Korea	0.966
24	Ticino	Switzerland	0.965
25	North Holland	Netherlands	0.964
25	Northwestern Switzerland	Switzerland	0.964

25 lowest HDIs
The top 25 regions with the lowest HDI in 2023 were:

Rank	Region	Country	HDI (2023)
Low human development
1	Middle Juba	Somalia	0.230
2	Galguduud	Somalia	0.279
3	Zone 2 (Borkou, Ennedi, Tibesti, Kanem, Barh El Gazel, Lac)	Chad	0.284
4	Hiran	Somalia	0.285
5	Bakool	Somalia	0.296
5	Bay	Somalia	0.296
7	Lower Juba	Somalia	0.302
8	Zone 5 (Chari-Baguirmi, Dababa, Baguirmi, Hadjer-Lamis)	Chad	0.303
9	Zone 4 (Ouaddai, Assoungha, Sila, Wadi Fira)	Chad	0.306
10	Sahel Region	Burkina Faso	0.308
11	Northern Bahr el Ghazal	South Sudan	0.313
12	Middle Shabelle	Somalia	0.314
13	Warrap	South Sudan	0.315
17	Togdheer	Somalia	0.324
19	Lower Shabelle	Somalia	0.326
20	Timbuktu Region	Mali	0.328
21	Gedo	Somalia	0.329
25	Jonglei State	South Sudan	0.335

== Africa ==
Top 10 highest

The 10 regions with the highest HDI in 2023 were:

Rank	Region	Country	HDI (2023)
Very high human development
1	Port Said Governorate	Egypt	0.822
2	South (Grand Port, Savanne, Plaines Wilhems, Rivière Noire)	Mauritius	0.815
3	South-East District	Botswana	0.812
4	Suez Governorate	Egypt	0.808
5	Alexandria Governorate	Egypt	0.805
6	Cairo Governorate	Egypt	0.803
7	North (Port Louis, Pamplemousses, Rivière du Rempart, Flacq, Moka)	Mauritius	0.800
High human development
8	Grand Tunis (Ariana, Tunis, Ben Arous, Manouba)	Tunisia	0.790
9	North Center (Algiers, Blida, Boumerdès, Tipaza, Bouïra, Médéa, Tizi Ouzou, Béjaïa, Chlef, Aïn Defla)	Algeria	0.784
10	Damietta	Egypt	0.779

Top 10 lowest

The 10 regions with the lowest HDI in 2023 were:

Rank	Region	Country	HDI (2023)
Low human development
1	Middle Juba	Somalia	0.230
2	Galguduud	Somalia	0.279
3	Zone 2 (Borkou, Ennedi, Tibesti, Kanem, Barh El Gazel, Lac)	Chad	0.284
4	Hiran	Somalia	0.285
5	Bakool	Somalia	0.296
5	Bay	Somalia	0.296
7	Lower Juba	Somalia	0.302
8	Zone 5 (Chari-Baguirmi, Dababa, Baguirmi, Hadjer-Lamis)	Chad	0.303
9	Zone 4 (Ouaddai, Assoungha, Sila, Wadi Fira)	Chad	0.306
10	Sahel Region	Burkina Faso	0.308

== Asia ==
Top 10 highest

The 10 regions with the highest HDI in Asia in 2023 were:

Rank	Region	Country	HDI (2023)
Very high human development
1	Capital Area (Gyeonggi, Seoul, Incheon)	South Korea	0.967
2	Southern Kantō (Saitama, Chiba, Tokyo, Kanagawa, Yamanashi, Nagano)	Japan	0.951
3	Gyeongnam (South Gyeongsang, Busan, Ulsan)	South Korea	0.934
4	Kansai (Shiga, Kyoto, Osaka, Hyōgo, Nara, Wakayama)	Japan	0.927
5	Tōkai (Gifu, Shizuoka, Aichi, Mie)	Japan	0.925
6	Center (Riyadh, Al-Qassim)	Saudi Arabia	0.924
7	Chūgoku (Tottori, Shimane, Okayama, Hiroshima, Yamaguchi)	Japan	0.921
8	Chungcheong (North Chungcheong, South Chungcheong, Daejeon, Sejong)	South Korea	0.920
9	Jeolla (North Jeolla, South Jeolla, Gwangju)	South Korea	0.917
10	North (Northern Borders, Al Jawf, Ha'il)	Saudi Arabia	0.914

Top 10 lowest

The 10 regions with the lowest HDI in Asia in 2023 were:

Rank	Region	Country	HDI (2023)
Low human development
1	Hajjah, Sa'dah, 'Amran	Yemen	0.413
2	Al Bayda, Dhamar, Raymah	Yemen	0.420
3	Al Hudaydah, Al Mahwit	Yemen	0.422
4	South (Uruzgan, Helmand, Zabul, Nimroz, Kandahar)	Afghanistan	0.423
5	Former Federally Administered Tribal Areas	Pakistan	0.455
6	North East (Baghlan, Takhar, Badakhshan, Kunduz)	Afghanistan	0.464
6	Balochistan	Pakistan	0.464
8	West (Ghor, Herat, Badghis, Farah)	Afghanistan	0.466
9	Ibb	Yemen	0.470
10	East (Nangarhar, Kunar, Laghman, Nuristan)	Afghanistan	0.477

== Europe ==
Top 10 highest

The 10 regions with the highest HDI in Europe in 2023 were:

Rank	Region	Country	HDI (2023)
Very high human development
1	Zurich	Switzerland	0.993
2	London	United Kingdom	0.982
2	Oslo and Akershus	Norway	0.982
4	Hamburg	Germany	0.977
4	Berlin	Germany	0.977
6	Stockholm County	Sweden	0.976
6	Lake Geneva region	Switzerland	0.976
8	Prague	Czech Republic	0.975
9	Western Norway	Norway	0.974
10	Baden-Württemberg	Germany	0.972
10	Trøndelag	Norway	0.972

Top 10 lowest

The 10 regions with the lowest HDI in Europe in 2023 were:

Rank	Region	Country	HDI (2022)
High human development
1	Southeastern Statistical Region	North Macedonia	0.718
2	Western Ukraine	Ukraine	0.722
3	Central Ukraine	Ukraine	0.727
4	North Ukraine	Ukraine	0.737
5	Central Development Region	Republic of Moldova	0.738
5	Northeastern Statistical Region	North Macedonia	0.738
7	South Ukraine	Ukraine	0.740
8	Eastern Ukraine	Ukraine	0.741
9	Prizren district	Kosovo	0.742
9	Northern Development Region	Republic of Moldova	0.742

== North America ==
Top 10 highest

The 10 regions with the highest HDI in North America in 2023 were:

Rank	Region	Country	HDI (2023)
Very high human development
1	Massachusetts	United States	0.961
1	New Hampshire	United States	0.961
3	Minnesota	United States	0.960
4	Colorado	United States	0.958
5	Washington	United States	0.957
6	Connecticut	United States	0.955
6	Vermont	United States	0.955
8	District of Columbia	United States	0.952
9	Oregon	United States	0.949
10	New Jersey	United States	0.948
10	Virginia	United States	0.948

Top 10 lowest

The 10 regions with the lowest HDI in North America in 2023 were:

Rank	Region	Country	HDI (2023)
Low human development
1	Centre	Haiti	0.506
2	Artibonite	Haiti	0.521
3	Grand'Anse, Nippes	Haiti	0.525
4	Sud-Est	Haiti	0.533
5	Sud	Haiti	0.540
6	Nord-Est	Haiti	0.544
7	Nord-Ouest	Haiti	0.546
Medium human development
8	Lempira Department	Honduras	0.567
9	North	Haiti	0.569
10	Gracias a Dios Department	Honduras	0.577

== South America ==
Top 10 highest

The 10 regions with the highest HDI in South America in 2023 were:

Rank	Region	Country	HDI (2023)
Very high human development
1	Santiago Metropolitan Region	Chile	0.908
2	Tarapacá Region	Chile	0.904
2	Arica y Parinacota	Chile	0.904
4	Antofagasta Region	Chile	0.900
5	Valparaíso Region	Chile	0.894
6	Magallanes Region	Chile	0.892
7	Atacama Region	Chile	0.881
8	Montevideo	Uruguay	0.878
9	Panama Province	Panama	0.871
10	Northwest Region	Argentina	0.867

Top 10 lowest

The 10 regions with the lowest HDI in South America in 2023 were:

Rank	Region	Country	HDI (2023)
Medium human development
1	Brokopondo and Sipaliwini	Suriname	0.591
2	Apure	Venezuela	0.638
3	Potosí Department	Bolivia	0.648
4	Barinas	Venezuela	0.656
5	Portuguesa	Venezuela	0.657
6	Vaupés Department	Colombia	0.663
7	Guárico	Venezuela	0.671
8	Yaracuy	Venezuela	0.671
9	Trujillo	Venezuela	0.678
10	Sucre	Venezuela	0.679

== Oceania ==
Top 10 highest

The 10 regions with the highest HDI in Oceania in 2023 were:

Rank	Region	Country	HDI (2023)
Very high human development
1	Australian Capital Territory	Australia	0.988
2	Western Australia	Australia	0.973
3	Wellington Region	New Zealand	0.968
4	Auckland Region	New Zealand	0.967
5	New South Wales	Australia	0.958
6	Hawaii	United States	0.957
7	Victoria	Australia	0.954
8	Queensland	Australia	0.947
9	Northern Territory	Australia	0.944
9	South Australia	Australia	0.944

Top 10 lowest

The 10 regions with the lowest HDI in Oceania in 2023 were:

Rank	Region	Country	HDI (2023)
Low human development
1	Hela Province	Papua New Guinea	0.480
2	Enga Province	Papua New Guinea	0.511
2	Southern Highlands Province	Papua New Guinea	0.511
4	Gulf Province	Papua New Guinea	0.541
5	Eastern Highlands Province	Papua New Guinea	0.544
6	Torba Province	Vanuatu	0.549
Medium human development
7	Sandaun Province	Papua New Guinea	0.550
8	Penama Province	Vanuatu	0.564
9	East Sepik Province	Papua New Guinea	0.571
10	Jiwaka Province	Papua New Guinea	0.573
