= Bu'ale District =

- Capital city of Jubaland
- Location in Jubaland, Somalia.
- Coordinates: 1°5′0″N 42°35′0″E
- Country: Somalia
- Region: Middle Juba
- District: Bu'ale
- Control: Al-Shabaab

Area
  - Total: 30 km^{2} (12 sq mi)
- Time zone: UTC+3 (EAT)

Bu'ale or Bu'aale (Somali: Bu'aale) is an agricultural city located in Middle Juba (Jubbada dhexe) region of Somalia and the capital city of Jubaland state of Somalia.

== History ==
During the Middle Ages, Bu'aale and its surrounding area was part of the Ajuran Empire that governed much of southern Somalia and eastern Ethiopia, with its domain extending from Hobyo in the north, to Qelafo in the west, to Kismayo in the south.

In the early modern period, Bu'aale was ruled by the Geledi Sultanate. The kingdom was eventually incorporated into Italian Somaliland protectorate in 1910 also 5 decades later After independence in 1960, the city was made the center of the official Bu'ale

== Geography ==
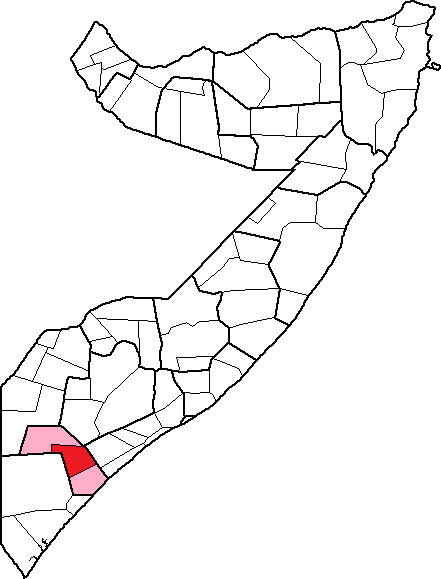
Map of Bu'ale District

=== Location ===
Bu'aale is located in the fertile Juba Valley in southeastern Somalia. Nearby settlements include to the northeast Xamareyso (5.0 nm), to the north Dalxiiska (1.3 nm), to the northwest Qeyla Dheere (6.4 nm), to the west Saamogia (0.9 nm), to the southwest Iach Bulle (17.0 nm), and to the south Qandal (7.5 nm). The largest cities in the country most proximate to Bu'aale are Jamaame (22 km), Jilib (97 km), and Merca (337 km).

=== Climate ===
Bu'aale has a hot arid climate (Köppen climate classification BWh), despite receiving around 375 millimetres or 15 inches of rainfall per year, due to the extremely high potential evapotranspiration. Weather is hot year-round, with seasonal monsoon winds and irregular rainfall with recurring droughts. The gu rains, also known as the Southwest Monsoons, begin in April and last until July producing significant fresh water and allowing lush vegetation to grow. The gu season is followed by the xagaa (hagaa) dry season.

Climate data for Kismayo
Month	Jan	Feb	Mar	Apr	May	Jun	Jul	Aug	Sep	Oct	Nov	Dec	Year
Record high °C (°F)	31.8 (89.2)	33.1 (91.6)	34.0 (93.2)	37.8 (100.0)	34.0 (93.2)	34.0 (93.2)	32.3 (90.1)	32.4 (90.3)	30.3 (86.5)	31.5 (88.7)	32.2 (90.0)	33.0 (91.4)	37.8 (100.0)
Mean daily maximum °C (°F)	29.6 (85.3)	29.9 (85.8)	31.0 (87.8)	31.8 (89.2)	30.4 (86.7)	28.6 (83.5)	28.0 (82.4)	28.3 (82.9)	28.6 (83.5)	29.5 (85.1)	30.5 (86.9)	30.5 (86.9)	29.7 (85.5)
Daily mean °C (°F)	27.1 (80.8)	27.3 (81.1)	28.2 (82.8)	28.6 (83.5)	27.3 (81.1)	26.1 (79.0)	25.6 (78.1)	25.7 (78.3)	26.0 (78.8)	26.8 (80.2)	27.5 (81.5)	27.5 (81.5)	27.0 (80.6)
Mean daily minimum °C (°F)	24.2 (75.6)	24.5 (76.1)	25.4 (77.7)	25.8 (78.4)	24.8 (76.6)	23.5 (74.3)	23.1 (73.6)	23.3 (73.9)	23.3 (73.9)	24.0 (75.2)	24.5 (76.1)	24.4 (75.9)	24.2 (75.6)
Record low °C (°F)	21.0 (69.8)	22.0 (71.6)	23.0 (73.4)	21.3 (70.3)	20.0 (68.0)	21.0 (69.8)	19.0 (66.2)	21.0 (69.8)	22.0 (71.6)	22.4 (72.3)	22.5 (72.5)	22.0 (71.6)	19.0 (66.2)
Average rainfall mm (inches)	1 (0.0)	1 (0.0)	3 (0.1)	39 (1.5)	111 (4.4)	89 (3.5)	52 (2.0)	21 (0.8)	21 (0.8)	15 (0.6)	17 (0.7)	3 (0.1)	374 (14.7)
Average rainy days (≥ 0.1 mm)	0	0	0	4	7	11	9	5	3	2	2	1	43
Average relative humidity (%)	77	76	76	77	80	80	80	79	78	78	77	77	78
Mean monthly sunshine hours	235.6	226.0	248.0	210.0	257.3	207.0	192.2	251.1	225.0	248.0	225.0	217.0	2,742.2
Mean daily sunshine hours	7.6	8.0	8.0	7.0	8.3	6.9	6.2	8.1	7.5	8.0	7.5	7.0	7.5
Percentage possible sunshine	64	73	69	62	59	57	56	62	64	66	66	66	64
Source 1: Deutscher Wetterdienst
Source 2: Food and Agriculture Organization: Somalia Water and Land Management (percent sunshine)
