= Economy of Moldova =

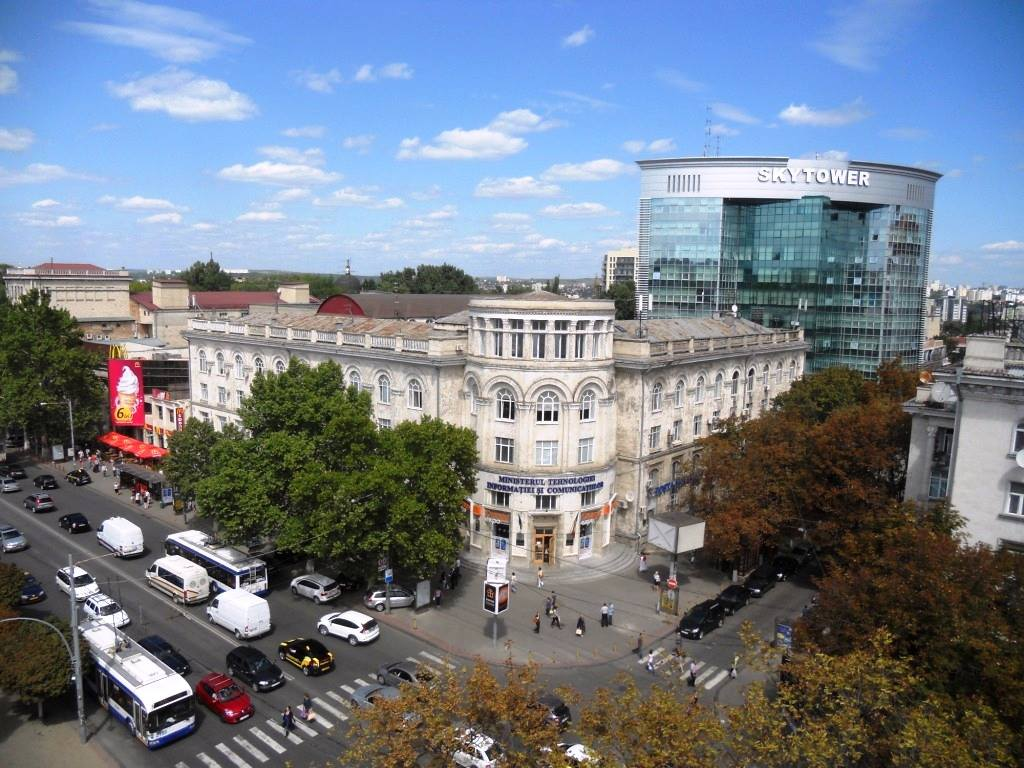
- The International Business Centre Skytower in Chișinău
- Currency: Moldovan leu (MDL)
- Fiscal year: Calendar year
- Trade organisations: WTO, GUAM, CEFTA, BSEC, CISFTA, EAEU (observer)
- Country group: Developing/Emerging; Upper-middle income economy; Eastern European economy; sizable remittances; emigration

Statistics
- Population: ▼2.34 million (2026 est.)
- GDP: ▲$21.89 billion (nominal, 2026 est.); ▲$49.54 billion (PPP, 2026 est.)
- GDP rank: 130th (nominal, 2026); 135th (PPP, 2026)
- GDP growth: 1.9% (2026); 3.2% (2027); 3.6% (2028)
- GDP per capita: ▲$9,350 (nominal, 2026 est.); ▲$21,170 (PPP, 2026 est.)
- GDP per capita rank: 95th (nominal, 2026); 95th (PPP, 2022)
- GDP per capita growth: 4.2% (2025)
- GDP by sector: agriculture: 8.29%; industry: 19.42%; services: 58.37%; (2022)
- Inflation (CPI): 13.4% (2023); 5.0% (2024); 5.0% (2025)
- Population below national poverty line: ▲26.8% (2020); 14% on less than $6.85/day (2021)
- Gini coefficient: ▲26.0 low (2019)
- Human Development Index: ▼0.763 high HDI (86th) (2022); ▼0.698 medium IHDI (58th) (2022)
- Corruption Perceptions Index: ▲42 out of 100 points (2023) (76th)
- Labour force: ▲900.4 thousand (Q2, 2022); ▲41.3% employment rate (Q2, 2022)
- Labour force by occupation: agriculture: 22.9%; industry and construction: 22%; services: 55.1%; (Q2, 2022)
- Unemployment: ▼2.4% (Q2, 2022); ▼21.6 thousand unemployed (Q2, 2022)
- Youth unemployment: ▼4.2% (2025)
- Average gross salary: MDL 14,116.8 / €732 / $752 monthly (Q3, 2024)
- Average net salary: MDL 11,304.74 / €585 / $602 monthly (Q3, 2024)
- Main industries: Food processing, agricultural machinery; foundry equipment, refrigerators and freezers, washing machines; hosiery, shoes, textiles, sugar processing, vegetable oil.

External
- Exports: ▼$4.299 billion (2024)
- Export goods: Cereals and cereal-based products; seeds and oleaginous fruits; electrical machines, appliances and parts thereof; vegetable fats and oils − fixed, crude, refined or fractionated; vegetables and fruits; clothing and accessories; furniture and parts thereof; alcoholic and non-alcoholic beverages; yarns, fabrics, textiles and related products; road vehicles; Others.
- Main export partners: EU 63.64%; Romania 29.9%; Italy 5.81%; Czechia 5.45%; Germany 4.51%; Poland 4.33%; Ukraine 7.87%; Turkey 5.10%; United States 2.81%; Russia 2.74%; China 2.39% (2024)
- Imports: ▲$9.63 billion (2024)
- Import goods: Refined petroleum and oils obtained from bituminous minerals; Medicaments; Motor cars and other motor vehicles, including station wagons and tractors; Insulated wire, cable and other insulated conductors; Optical, photographic, cinematographic instruments and apparatus; Insecticides, rodenticides, herbicides and similar products; Electrical apparatus for switching or protecting electrical circuits (switches, relays, fuses, etc.); Automatic data processing machines; Chemical products; Others.
- Main import partners: EU 51.94%; Romania 18.1%; Germany 7.06%; Italy 4.87%; Poland 3.95%; Czechia 2.46%; China 12.8%; Ukraine 12.1%; Turkey 7.26%; Russia 2.16%; United States 1.48% (2024)
- FDI stock: ▲$4.851 billion (2020 est.); FDI net flux: ▼$62.45 million (2020 est.)
- Current account: ▼$ −1.8 billion (2022 est.); ▼ −12.8% of GDP (2022 est.)
- Gross external debt: ▼$8.687 billion (30 June 2022); ▼60.9% of GDP (2022 est.)

Public finance
- Government debt: ▲MDL 82.742 billion (30 June 2022); ▼29.6% of GDP (2022 est.)
- Foreign reserves: ▲$4.228 billion (30 Sep 2022)
- Budget balance: ▼MDL −17.219 billion (2022 est.); ▼ −6.19% of GDP (2022 est.)
- Revenue: ▲MDL 89.610 billion (2022 est.); ▲32.2% of GDP (2022 est.)
- Spending: ▲MDL 106.8 billion (2022 est.); ▲38.4% of GDP (2022 est.)
- Credit rating: Standard & Poor's (2025); BB−; Outlook: Stable; Moody's (2026); B2; Outlook: Stable; Fitch (2026); B+; Outlook: Stable
- All values, unless otherwise stated, are in US dollars.

Moldova has an emerging, upper-middle income economy, It is a landlocked Eastern European country, bordered by Ukraine on the East and Romania to the West. It is a former Soviet republic and is a candidate member to the European Union.

== History ==
On 2 January 1992, Moldova introduced a market economy, liberalising prices, which resulted in huge inflation. In 1993, a national currency, the Moldovan leu, was introduced to replace the Soviet rouble. The economic fortunes of Moldova began to change in 2001; since then the country has seen a steady annual growth of between 5% and 10%. Remittances from Moldovans abroad account for a quarter of Moldova's GDP, one of the highest percentages in the world.

== Overview ==
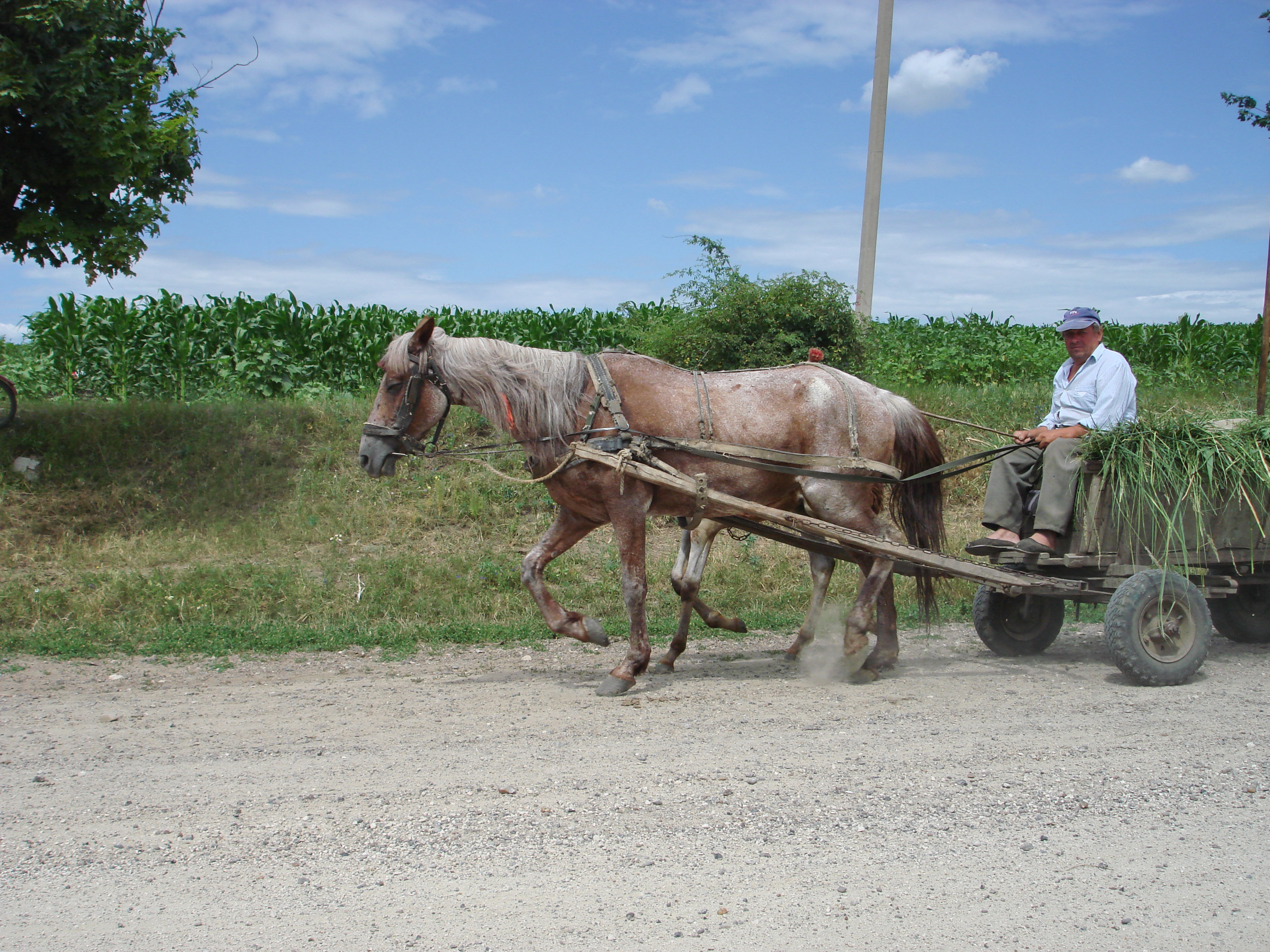
Horse-drawn carts in the Moldovan countryside

Moldova's proximity to the Black Sea gives it a mild and sunny climate. The fertile Chernozem soil supports wheat, corn, barley, tobacco, sugar beet, and soybeans. Beef and dairy cattle are raised, and beekeeping is widespread. Moldova's best-known product comes from its extensive and well-developed vineyards concentrated in the central and southern regions. Moldova produces liqueur and sparkling wine. It is also known for its sunflower seeds, walnuts, apples, and other fruits. This makes the area ideal for agriculture and food processing, which accounts for about 40% of the country's GDP.

In 2018, Moldova produced:

- 1.1 million tons of wheat;
- 132 thousand tons of plum;
- 174 thousand tons of potato;
- 175 thousand tons of barley;
- 2.0 million tons of maize;
- 665 thousand tons of apple;
- 707 thousand tons of sugar beet (the beet is used to manufacture sugar and ethanol);
- 730 thousand tons of grape;
- 788 thousand tons of sunflower seed.

In addition to smaller productions of other agricultural products, like rapeseed (85 thousand tons). Moldova has a production of grape and apple between the 20th and 25th largest in the world, and a production of plum and sunflower seed between the 10th and 15th largest of the world.

GDP by sector, 1989, 1999 and 2015

Moldova has experienced economic difficulties, like many other former Soviet republics. Since its economy was highly dependent on the rest of the former Soviet Union for energy and raw materials, the breakdown in trade following the breakup of the Soviet Union had a serious effect, exacerbated at times by drought and civil conflict. The Russian rouble devaluation of 1998 had a deleterious effect on Moldova's economy, but economic growth has been steady since 2000.

Moldova has made progress in economic reform since independence. The government has liberalized most prices and has phased out subsidies on most basic consumer goods. A program begun in March 1993 has privatized 80% of all housing units and nearly 2,000 small, medium, and large enterprises, which led to a rise in homelessness and unemployment. Other successes include the privatization of nearly all of Moldova's agricultural land from state to private ownership, as a result of an American assistance program completed in 2000. A stock market opened in June 1995.

Inflation was brought down from over 105% in 1994 to 11% in 1997. Though inflation spiked again after Russia's 1998 currency devaluation, Moldova made great strides in bringing it under control: 18.4% in 2000, 6.3% in 2001, and 4.4% in 2002. In 2003 inflation escalated again – due mainly to a drought-driven rise in agricultural prices – reaching 15.7%, although it was reined in to 12.5% in 2004. The local currency appreciated considerably in 2003 and the first months of 2004. By May, the leu had reached its highest level since the end of 1999. After the National Bank of Moldova increased considerably its purchases on the foreign exchange market, the leu stabilized in November–December 2004 at 12.00–12.50 to the US dollar.

Moldova continues transitioning towards a free-market economy. The country recorded its fifth consecutive year of positive GDP growth in 2004, with year-end real GDP growth of 8%. This growth is impressive considering that, prior to 2000, Moldova had recorded only one year of positive GDP growth since independence. Budget execution in 2004 was also impressive, as actual consolidated budget revenues exceeded projections by 1.4% for most of the year.

Privatization results in 2004 were not significant: several smaller companies and one winery were privatized in 2004, but the government postponed indefinitely the privatization of several larger state enterprises, including two electricity distribution companies. Sporadic and ineffective enforcement of the law, economic and political uncertainty, and government harassment and interference continue to discourage inflows of foreign direct investment.

Imports continued to increase more rapidly than exports during the first nine months of 2004; Moldova’s terms of trade worsened, as higher-priced energy imports outpaced the value of Moldova’s main exports—agricultural and agro-processing goods.

During 2002, Moldova rescheduled an outstanding Eurobond, in the amount of $39.6 million, to avoid a potential default. In May 2004, Moldova redeemed promissory notes with a total value of $114.5 million to Russian Gazprom for just $50 million. Moldova informed its bilateral creditors in mid-2003 that it would no longer service its debts. The 2004 budget did provide funds for external debt service (interest) at some 6% of the government budget, the 2005 budget projects external debt service at some 4%. The International Monetary Fund (IMF) and World Bank resumed lending to Moldova in July 2002, and then suspended lending again in July 2003. Although Moldova passed a poverty reduction strategy in 2004, it has yet to reach an agreement with international financial institutions.

70% of total electrical energy power consumed in Moldova is imported from Ukraine and only 30% is produced in Moldova.

In 2021 Moldova's trade with Russia was $1.33b compared with the EU of $5.06. In 2022 the EU trade increased to $6.9b

== Macroeconomic situation ==
Real GDP per capita development of Moldova, 1973 to 2018

As a whole, Moldova is doing well, despite a series of consecutive shocks, which included the doubling of the price of imported natural gas and 2006 Russian ban of Moldovan and Georgian wines, and a severe drought in 2007. Growth is estimated at 5 percent in 2007 and is projected to increase to 7 percent in 2008. Investment is picking up, and is beginning to replace remittances as the main source of growth—an encouraging sign that the earlier model of consumption-driven growth is changing.

Moldova increasingly faces the challenges experienced by other transition economies. Improved growth prospects have come with strong appreciation pressures from foreign exchange inflows, and a widening trade deficit. Foreign direct investment (FDI) has picked up and is estimated to have reached 12 percent of GDP in 2007, compared with 7 percent in 2006.

The main macroeconomic concern is inflation, which at 13 percent remains high for the region.

A deterioration in the merchandise trade balance due to strong import growth has been offset by improvements in net income and transfers, with a small improvement in the current account deficit to 12 percent of GDP. A resumption of wine exports to Russia in October was a major positive development, although volumes are likely to recover slowly.

Fiscal policy remained tight, ending 2007 with a modest deficit of 0.3 percent of GDP. Strong revenue performance was driven by robust VAT on imports, while expenditure was kept in line with the budget. However, the tax cuts introduced in 2008 may undermine the favorable fiscal position.

Monetary tightening in 2007 was complicated by the strong inflow of foreign exchange. The National Bank of Moldova increased reserve requirements from 10 to 15 percent, and raised policy interest rates by 2.5 percentage points. Nevertheless, the possibility of second-round effects from the drought, liquidity pressures from growing remittances and FDI, and the continued strong growth in credit and broad money suggest that upside risks to inflation are not yet fully contained.

In spite of some favorable background, Moldova remains Europe's poorest nation, resisting pursuing the types of reforms that have vastly improved the economies of some of its Eastern European neighbors. The Communist Party retained political control after winning the March 2005 parliamentary elections and re-elected its leader, Vladimir Voronin, as president in collaboration with the opposition. Although the government maintains a pro-Western stance, it has had trouble pursuing structural reforms and has made little progress on the International Monetary Fund's program to attract external financial resources. The parliament approved the government's economic growth and strategy paper in December 2004, but international financial institutions and Western investors will not be satisfied until the government begins to address fiscal adjustment, wage restraint, and payment of debt arrears. Despite the fact that the pace of privatization and industrial output has slowed, GDP growth was 7.3 percent in 2004, consumption continues to grow, and the currency continues to appreciate. The impasse in the pro-Russian Transnistria enclave, plagued by corruption and the smuggling of arms and contraband, continues despite international attempts at mediation.

In 2025, the current account deficit (CAD) reached a record level of 23% of GDP, and was financed through the drawdown of cash deposits and the issuance of debt, bringing external debt to 57.7% of GDP, while international reserves maintained the level of $5.1 billion. This was because the economy experienced a recession in the first half of 2025, despite a slight growth of 1.1% in the second quarter. While growth was supported by domestic demand, driven by improved wages and energy-related transfers and capital investments, exports declined as a result of drought, weak external demand, and a decline in reexports to Ukraine.

== Business and economic environment ==
According to the 2024 Index of Economic Freedom, Moldova ranks 99th globally with the overall score of 57.1, a decrease relative to 2023.

Rule of Law			Regulatory Efficiency			Government Size			Open Markets		
Parameter	Score	Change in Yearly Score from 2022	Parameter	Score	Change in Yearly Score from 2022	Parameter	Score	Change in Yearly Score from 2022	Parameter	Score	Change in Yearly Score from 2022
Property Rights	37.9	▼	Business Freedom	60.2	▼	Government Spending	64.4	▼	Trade Freedom	75.6	▼
Government Integrity	35.6	▲	Labor Freedom	46.6	▲	Tax Burden	93.4	▼	Investment Freedom	55.0	Steady
Judicial Effectiveness	29.8	▼	Monetary Freedom	71.2	▼	Fiscal Health	82.1	▼	Financial Freedom	50.0	Steady

*Everything above 60 is considered to be Moderately Free.

According to the 2020 Ease of Doing Business Index, Moldova's Distance to Frontier is 74.4/100 (48th globally), an increase of 1.3 relative to 2019.

Ease of doing business, 2020
Parameter	DTF
Starting a Business	95.7%	▲
Dealing with Construction Permits	56.2%	▲
Getting Electricity	75.3%	▲
Registering Property	82.8%	▲
Getting Credit	70.00%	Steady
Protecting Minority Investors	68.0%	Steady
Paying Taxes	85.2%	▲
Trading Across Borders	92.3%	Steady
Enforcing Contracts	63.6%	▲
Resolving Insolvency	54.8%	▲

*DTF (Distance to Frontier): Higher is better

== Sectors ==
=== Agriculture ===
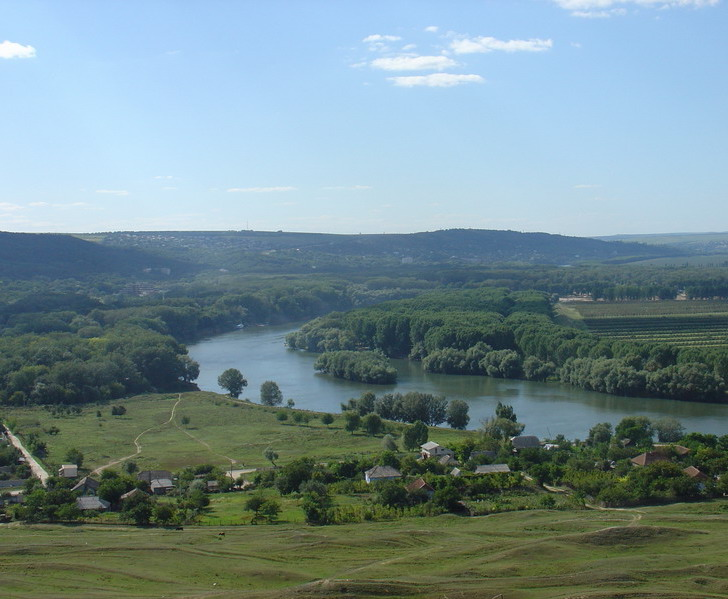
Agricultural Land in Dniester, Moldova

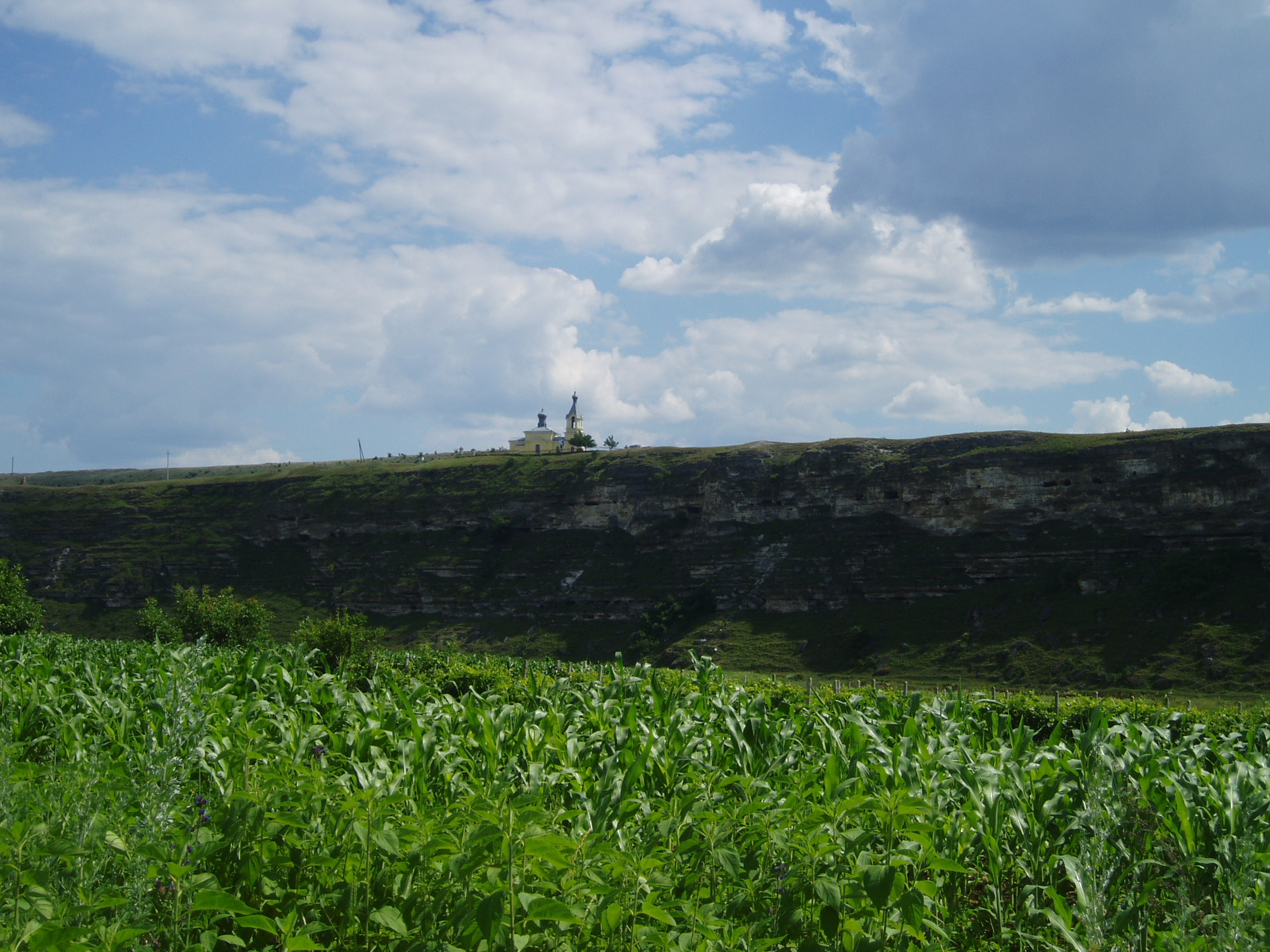
Corn field at Orheiul Vechi, Moldova

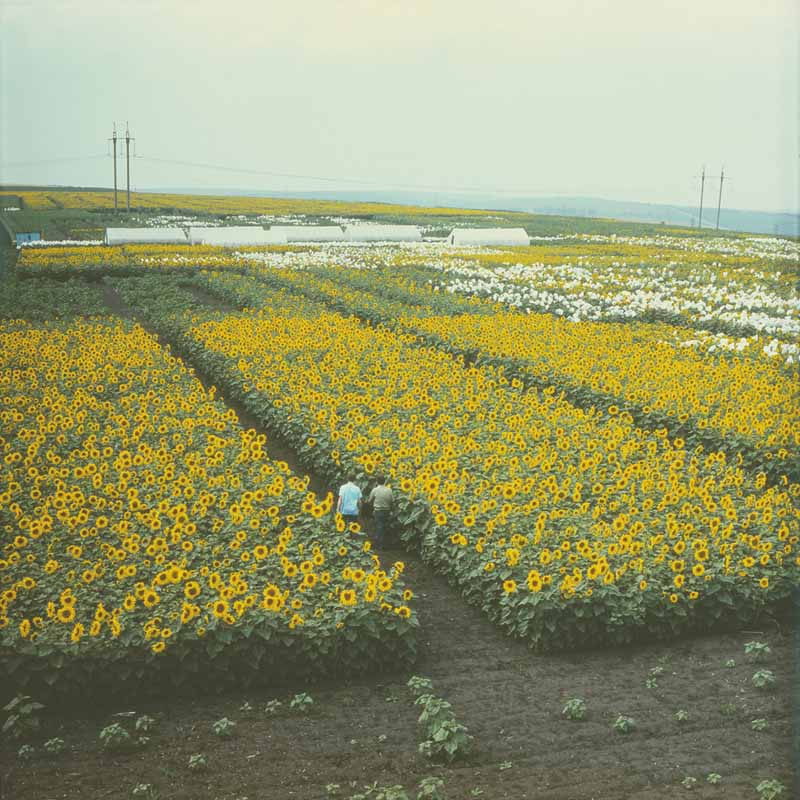
Sunflower fields in Balti, Moldova

Moldova is an agrarian-industrial state, with agricultural land occupying 2,499,000 hectares in a total area of 3,384,600 hectares. It is estimated that 1,810,500 of these hectares are arable. Moldova is located in Eastern Europe, and is landlocked, bordering Romania and Ukraine. Moldova's agricultural sector benefits from a geographical proximity to large markets, namely the European Union. As a share of GDP, agriculture has declined from 56% in 1995 to 13.8% in 2013. Data from 2015 estimated that agriculture accounted for 12% of Moldova's GDP. Agriculture as a sector is export-oriented, with the composition of Moldova's total exports containing agriculture and the agri-food sector as a main component. 70% of agri-food exports in 2012 included beverages, edible fruits and nuts, oilseeds, vegetable preparations and cereals. Here, fruits, vegetables and nuts were attributed to 33% of Moldova's exports for 2011–2013. Moldova is also one of the top ten apple exporters in the world. However, because of the long-term emphasis on fruit, vegetables are often imported.

The declining share of agriculture in GDP does not extend to national value-added, where the agricultural sector in Moldova has the largest share relative to Central and Eastern European countries, withstanding a low productivity. Moldova's growth corresponds to a declining role of agriculture as a sector, and the rising importance of the services sector, aligning with trends for growth of developing economies.

=== Energy ===
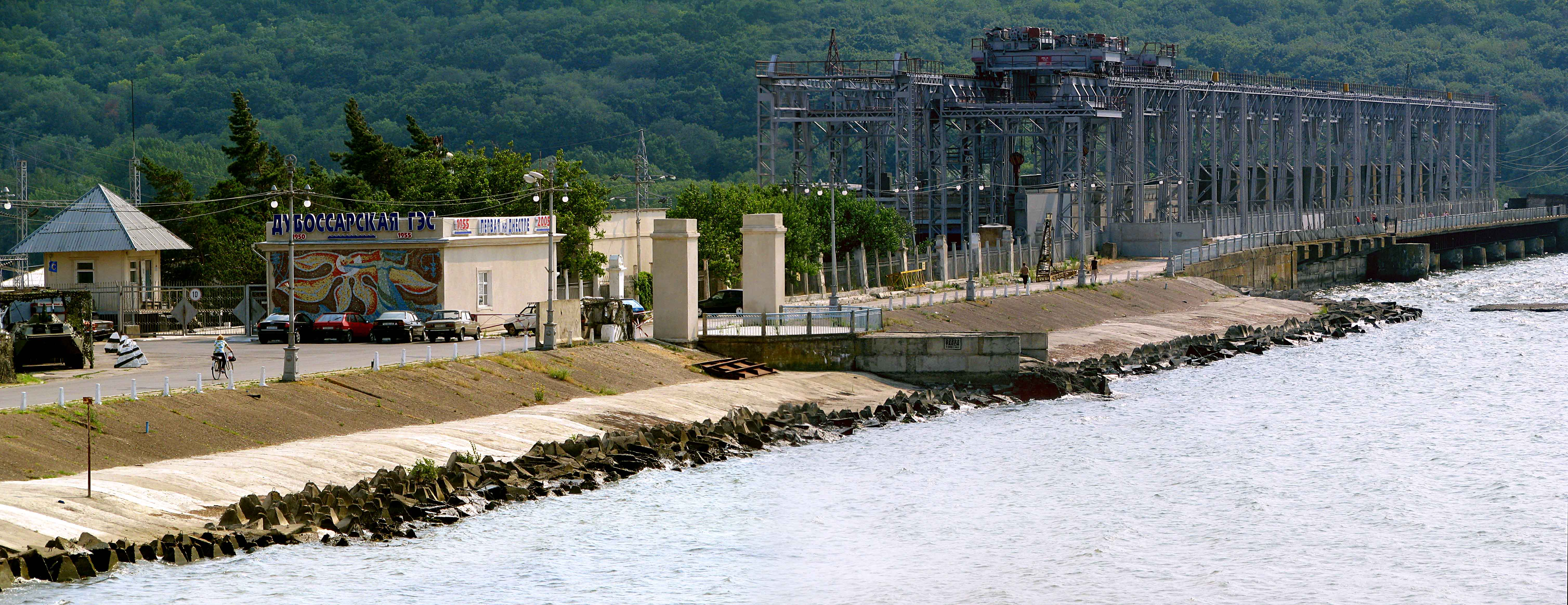
Dubăsari Reservoir

With few natural energy resources, Moldova imports almost all of its energy supplies. Fifty percent of Moldovagaz, the country's national energy company, is owned by Russian oil and natural gas supplier Gazprom, with the remaining 50% split between the Moldovan government (36.6%) and the unrecognised government of Transnistria (13.4%). Moldova's historic dependence on Russian energy is underscored by a debt of more than US$709 million to Gazprom as well as a further US$7 billion by Transnistria. Russia supplies the breakaway pro-Russian region with oil and natural gas without requiring them to pay, with the cost levied as debt against the Moldovan state as a form of economic warfare. The Moldovan government disputes the figures, and has identified more than US$100 million in fraudulent claims by Gazprom.

In August 2013, work began on a pipeline between Moldova and Romania that has now been completed and has broken Russia's monopoly on Moldova's gas supplies. Importing electricity from Romania began in 2022, thereby eliminating the need to buy electricity generated from Russian gas in Transnistria. Improved connectivity will be completed by 2025. As of June 2023, Moldova no longer imports oil or natural gas from Russia and has been granted access to the European Union's joint gas purchasing platform. Financial assistance was provided by the European Union, the World Bank, and the IMF in order to speed up this transition.

Moldova lacks domestic sources of fossil energy and must import substantial amounts of petroleum, coal, natural gas, and other energy resources. The primary energy supply in 2018 was about half natural gas, a quarter oil, and solid biomass at one-fifth.

Renewable energy has expanded rapidly, and Moldova is seeking to diversify its energy sources and cease purchasing from Russia.

=== Banking and finance ===
There are no official barriers to founding foreign banks or branches in Moldova. The central bank the National Bank of Moldova has a responsibility to the management and control of all banks in Moldova.

In 2014 a major fraud took place, the 2014 Moldovan bank fraud scandal which nearly bankrupted the country. $1 billion disappeared from three Moldovan banks: Banca de Economii, Unibank and Banca Socială. In the week preceding the 2014 Moldovan parliamentary election more than $750 million were extracted from the three banks in just three days, with a van loaded with stolen files from the banks being burned. A number of people were charged, Ilan Shor was convicted but fled justice.

Major reforms to the legal framework of the Moldovan financial sector have taken place as the country progresses to implementing the EU`s legislation. By 2023 the Moldovan banking system is regarded as harmonized at a high level with the relevant EU community. The IMF reported in 2023 that Banks remain adequately capitalised, maintain adequate liquidity coverage and healthy asset quality. However, in December 2023, Moldovan parliament voted to dismiss NBM governor Octavian Armașu. In a June 2024 report, the European Commission described Armașu's dismissal as sudden and unexpected, stating that "the procedure by which the former governor was dismissed is a cause for concern and may pose a risk to the independence of the central bank". The decision was also scrutinised by the IMF, referring to the decision as abrupt and course for concern about the independence of the NBM. Due to his dismissal, the Ministry of Finance in November 2024 put forth an amendment to remove Parliament's sole right to dismiss and approve the management of the banking authority.

=== Healthcare ===
The Republic of Moldova has a universal health care system.

The Human Rights Measurement Initiative finds that Moldova is fulfilling 78.2% of what it should be fulfilling for the right to health based on its level of income. When looking at the right to health with respect to children, Moldova achieves 96.7% of what is expected based on its current income. In regards to the right to health amongst the adult population, the country achieves only 84.7% of what is expected based on the nation's level of income. Moldova falls into the "very bad" category when evaluating the right to reproductive health because the nation is fulfilling only 53.2% of what the nation is expected to achieve based on the resources (income) it has available.

=== Telecommunications ===
Telecommunications in Moldova are maintained at a relatively high performance level. Because Moldova is a small country, telecommunications companies managed to achieve good coverage in both wired and wireless communications infrastructure. Landline is available in most settlements, however mobile phone popularity has vastly increased in recent years. Mobile communications infrastructures are fairly well developed but suffer from high prices, nonetheless the amount of mobile subscriptions is growing very fast compared to the landline. As far as the Internet is concerned, Moldova has one of the best wired Internet connections in the world as well as one of the cheapest in $ per Mbit.

=== Tourism ===
- Total: ▲503,700 in 2023
  - International Tourism: ▲406,000
    - Inbound: ▲43,600
      - Romania - 38.9%
      - Italy - 14.4%
      - Ukraine - 14.0%
      - Germany - 5.3%
      - USA - 5.2%
    - Outbound: ▲362,400
      - Turkey - 47.0%
      - Bulgaria - 18.9%
      - Egypt - 10.6%
      - Romania - 10.3%
      - Greece - 5.5%
  - Domestic Tourism: ▼97,700

There are around 15,000 sights and 300 natural zones within Moldova, which represent a potential for domestic and international tourists.

=== Transport ===
In 1995, the main means of transportation in Moldova were railways (1,138 km or 707 mi) and a highway system (12,730 km or 7,910 mi overall, including 10,973 km or 6,818 mi of paved surfaces). The major railway junctions are Chișinău, Bender, Ungheni, Ocnița, Bălți, and Basarabeasca. Primary external rail links connect the republic's network with Odesa (in Ukraine) on the Black Sea and with the Romanian cities of Iași and Galați; they also lead northward into Ukraine. Highways link Moldova's main cities and provide the chief means of transportation within the country, but roads are in poor repair. The country's major airport is in Chișinău.

Shipping is possible on the lower Prut and Nistru rivers, but water transportation plays only a modest role in the country's transportation system. In 1990 a total of 317 million tonkilometers of freight were carried on inland waterways as compared with 15,007 million ton-kilometers on railways and 1,673 million ton-kilometers on roads.

The movement of manufactured goods and of passengers on all means of transportation started to decline in 1989. From 1993 to 1994, for example, the total amount of transported goods fell by 31 percent, passenger traffic decreased by 28 percent, and the number of passengers declined by 24 percent. The main causes for these declines are the high cost of transportation, a lack of fuels, and the poor state of Moldova's transportation infrastructure: approximately 20 percent of Moldova's roads are considered in a critical technical state.

=== Water supply and sanitation ===
Water quality is one of Moldova's major environmental problems, particularly in relation to municipal wastewater, rural sanitation and pollution of small rivers. According to a 2025 EU4Green Recovery East assessment, only about 10% of Moldovan localities benefited from centralized sewerage services, with a large difference between urban areas, where connectivity was estimated at about 55%, and rural communities, where access was about 3%. The same assessment found that Moldova had 272 documented wastewater treatment plants, but only 31 of them, or about 11%, achieved normative treatment standards for basic discharge indicators such as biochemical oxygen demand, chemical oxygen demand and suspended solids.

Limited wastewater collection and treatment contributes to the pollution of surface and groundwater. The EU4Green assessment noted that many wastewater facilities rely on biological ponds with limited treatment efficiency, that aging sewerage networks suffer from infiltration and structural deterioration, and that industrial pre-treatment remains inconsistent across the country. Sludge management was also identified as a concern, as sludge is often stored untreated on land, creating additional environmental risks.

Surface-water monitoring has also shown contamination by several groups of pollutants. A 2023 EU4Environment surface-water survey in the Prut River basin analysed biological and physico-chemical quality elements, including pH, conductivity, dissolved oxygen, turbidity, biochemical oxygen demand, chemical oxygen demand, nutrients and other chemical parameters. The survey recorded elevated values of several parameters at individual monitoring stations, including ammonium nitrogen, nitrites, nitrates, orthophosphates, total phosphorus, sulphates, chlorides, sodium, potassium and anionic surfactants. Low water levels in many investigated rivers were also reported, increasing the concentration of chemical parameters and worsening biological results.

Official surface-water monitoring in Moldova is carried out by the Environment Agency through its Water Quality Laboratory, which monitors the surface waters of the Dniester and the Danube-Prut-Black Sea river basin districts. In 2026, ZIUZEA SRL, a Moldovan company working on nature-based water treatment solutions, announced that it had developed what it described as the first interactive surface-water quality map of Moldova. According to the company, the platform uses open-source and government data to make information about surface-water quality easier to access and understand, and is intended to be expanded with additional features showing water-quality dynamics, data providers, contamination levels and other indicators. The company also stated that the platform would be used to present floating wetland installations and demonstrate the role of nature-based solutions in water treatment and ecological restoration. The public map page lists monitoring locations and distinguishes between government-data points and floating wetland installations.

The problem is closely connected to rural water supply and sanitation. World Bank project documents state that Moldova has large rural-urban gaps in access to water supply and sanitation services, and that nearly one million Moldovans rely on shallow, often polluted and drought-prone wells for drinking water. The same document reported that about 80% of wells were not compliant with drinking-water norms, including due to nitrates and E. coli, and that sewer systems served only 3.6% of the rural population compared with 76.3% of urban residents.

Modernization of sewerage networks, rehabilitation of wastewater treatment plants, improved sludge management, better control of agricultural runoff, expanded monitoring of surface and groundwater and wider public access to environmental data are considered important measures for reducing Moldova's water pollution and improving public health.

== Trade policy ==
Exports of Moldova by product category (2019) Chemical products Transportation Machines Mineral products Plastics and rubbers Metals Foodstuffs Precious metals Textiles Instruments Animal products Vegetable products Paper goods Footwear and headwear Miscellaneous Stone and glass Wood products Animal and vegetable bi-products Animal hides Arts and antiques Weapons

According to the World Bank, Moldova's weighted average tariff rate in 2001 (the most recent year for which World Bank data are available) was 2.8 percent. (The World Bank has revised the figure for 2001 downward from the 3.9 percent reported in the 2005 Index.) A 2004 World Bank report notes a "range of informal barriers to both imports and exports in Moldova, such as cumbersome and restrictive trade procedures, corruption, burdensome and inappropriate regulations and high transport costs." Based on the revised trade factor methodology, Moldova's trade policy score is unchanged.

=== Free Trade Agreements ===
Currently Moldova has signed multilateral and bilateral Free Trade Agreements with 43 countries.

Agreement	Signed	Entry into Force	Comment
Moldova–Azerbaijan FTA	1995	1996	
Moldova–Georgia FTA	1997	2007	
CEFTA	19 December 2006	28 July 2007	
CISFTA	18 October 2011	9 December 2012	
DCFTA	27 June 2014	1 July 2016	Provisionally applied 1 September 2014 – 1 July 2016
Moldova–Turkey FTA	11 September 2014	1 November 2016	
EFTA-Moldova FTA	27 June 2023		Awaiting ratification
Moldova–China FTA			Under Negotiation

== Regional developments ==
Countries tend to benefit from sharing borders with developed markets as this facilitates trade and development. Below is a table of Moldova's neighboring countries, their GDP per capita in 1995 and 2021, and trade values between the pairs. Their evolution is distinct as Romania went from a GDP per capita which was about 1.7 times larger than that of Moldova's in 1995 to one which in 2021 is more than 2.5 times as large. Ukraine on the other hand has decreased when compared to Moldova.

Country	GDP per capita, PPP (current international $) 1995	GDP per capita, PPP (current international $) 2021
Romania	5,429	36,277
Ukraine	4,136	14,281
Moldova	3,145	15,009

The Russian Federation for comparison rose from 5,613 in 1995 to 34,043 in 2021, slightly less than Romania.

== Regional GDP ==
This is a list of regions of Republic of Moldova by nominal GDP shown in Moldovan leu and Euro. Statistics shown are for 2023.

Rank	Region	GDP (billion leu)	GDP (billion €)	GDP per capita (€)
	Moldova	274.488	13.834	5,700
1	Chișinău	185.778	9.493	13,200
2	Central Region	45.539	2.327	2,200
3	Northern Region	45.258	2.313	2,300
4	Southern Region	19.820	1.013	1,900
5	Transnistria	19.950	1.000	2,200
6	Gagauzia	7.158	0.366	3,500

== Fiscal burden ==
Moldova's income tax rate has been a flat 12 percent since 2019.

The corporate tax rate for SRL companies has been 12 percent from 2012, since 2018 the unique tax of 7% for IT companies part of Moldova IT Park was implemented.

The Sales tax (VAT) standard rate has remained at 20% since 2014. There are reduced rates of 12% and 8% for certain goods.

In 2024, Moldova decided that companies in Transnistria and Moldova should be treated in a similar way as regards customs duties on imported goods, resulting in Transnistria import companies needing to register with Moldova and pay import custom duties (but not V.A.T., nor excise duties) to Moldova. This would also hopefully reduce smuggling of goods out of Transnistria that had been imported duty free, such as cigarettes.

== Monetary policy ==
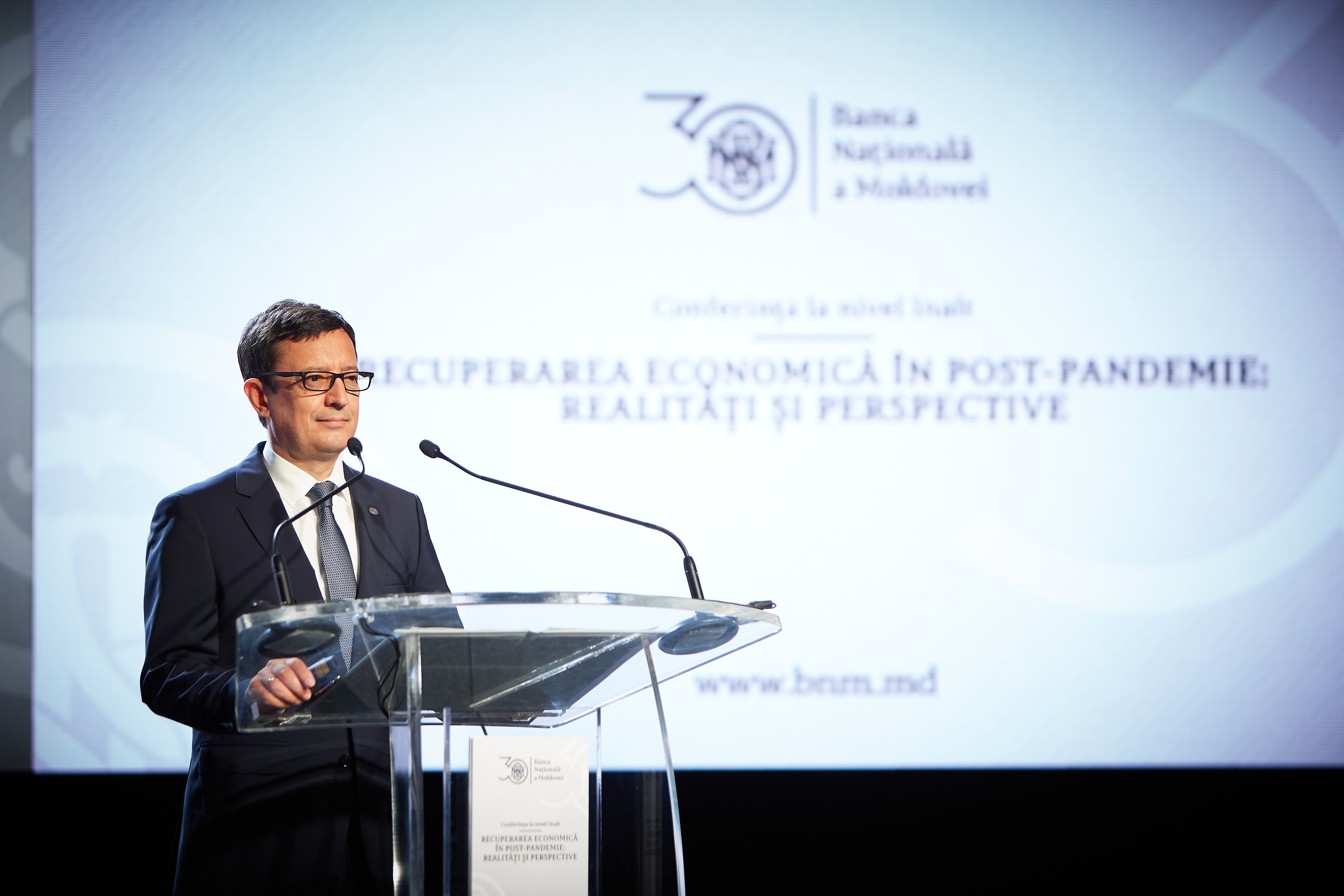
NBM governor Octavian Armașu speaking on post-pandemic economic recovery in June 2021

Monetary policy is decided by the governor of the National Bank of Moldova, which is nominally independent from the legislature.

Annual inflation rate hit 30.2% in December 2022, mainly as a result of the rise in world wide fuel and food costs, falling in 2023, interest rates are now also falling but remain high until inflation is under control. NBM gorvenor Octavian Armașu announced on 5 December 2022 the start monetary policy easing, as inflation was stable following the previous tightening of monetary policy. Thus, the base rate was from that point gradually reduced from 21.5 to 6 per cent by June 2023. On 15 November, Armașu announced that inflation due to the NBM's measures had returned to the variability corridor of 3.5–6.5 per cent, stating "Pro-inflationary factors will be weaker in the foreseeable event horizon, and our task for the time being is to pursue a monetary policy that stimulates aggregate demand". In addition, the annual rate for 2024 was lowered from 5.1 to 4.5 per cent.

== Foreign investment ==
The Moldovan government does not maintain many formal barriers to foreign investment, and the Moldovan embassy reports that foreign investors are free to "place their investments throughout the Republic of Moldova, in any area of business activity, as long as it does not go against the interests of the national security, anti-monopoly legislation, environment protection norms, public health and public order."

Since gaining independence in 1992, Moldova privatised most state-owned enterprises, and most sectors of the economy are almost entirely in private hands. The government keeping control of electrical distribution, railways, the state airline Air Moldova, fixed line communication company Moldtelecom and the country’s largest tobacco company.

Invest Moldova was created to encourage inward investment, promoting the low levels of tax on individuals and companies. Free Economic Zones have been created designed for export-oriented manufacturing companies, Industrial Parks have been established to bring companies together and offer lower operating costs.

Foreign direct investment is slowly rising, $587m in 2022, $410m in 2021 and $150m in 2020, with each year supplemented with $4.7-4.9 billion of loans, with manufacturing, financial intermediation, and trade being the main sectors.

== Wages and prices ==
The government influences prices through the large state-owned sector. According to the Ministry of Economy, the state regulates the prices of goods and services provided by monopolies and the prices of electric or thermal energy, land, medical services, and services offered by local tax regions. Moldova has two legal monthly minimum wages: one wage for state employees and another, higher wage for the private sector.

In 2023, the average monthly salary in the economy was MDL 12,175 (approx. 630 EUR / 686 USD)

== Property rights ==
The U.S. Department of Commerce reports that the "legal system has improved in recent years. Moldova has a documented and consistently applied commercial law." Nevertheless, much more needs to be done. According to the U.S. Department of State, "The Constitution provides for an independent judiciary; however, the executive branch has exerted undue influence on the judiciary. Many observers believe that arrears in salary payments also make it difficult for judges to remain independent from outside influences and free from corruption."

== Regulation ==
"Bureaucratic procedures are not always transparent and red tape often makes processing unnecessarily long," reports the U.S. Department of Commerce. "[C]ommercial law is a confusing patchwork of narrow statutes and an outdated civil code. With USAID experts, a draft civil code has been developed which follows the current European practice of incorporating commercial law provisions." The same source reports that anti-corruption laws "are not effectively enforced and corruption exists at an advanced level." A report provided by the World Bank indicates that labor laws are somewhat rigid.

== Informal market ==
Transparency International's 2004 score for Moldova is 2.3. Thereafter, Moldova's informal market score is 4 in 2005.

In 2011 the corruption score for Moldova is 2.9, better than it was in 2004, concluding TI. By 2024 the score had further increased to 43/100.

== Statistics ==
Year	GDP (in bil. US$ nominal)	GDP per capita (in US$ nominal)	GDP (in bil. US$ PPP)	GDP per capita (in US$ PPP)	GDP growth (real)	Inflation (CPI)	Inflation (End of Period)	Public Debt (Government Gross Debt)	Public Debt (Current Account Balance)	External Debt (General government US$)	Total External Debt (US$)
2013	9.496	3,307.3	23.961	8,345.0	9.0%	4.57%	5.1%	29.9%	-5.2%	1.305	6.729
2014	9.510	3,314.5	25.218	8,789.2	5.0%	5.06%	4.7%	34.9%	-6.0%	1.320	6.320
2015	7.726	2,715.7	26.233	9,221.8	-0.3%	9.6%	13.5%	42.4%	-6.0%	1.354	5.932
2016	8.072	2,857.8	29.732	10,527.0	4.4%	6.4%	2.3%	39.2%	-3.6%	1.481	6.056
2017	9.515	3,422.6	31.586	11,361.9	4.2%	6.5%	7.3%	34.8%	-5.8%	1.722	6.833
2018	11.252	4,121.0	33.671	12,332.0	4.1%	3.6%	0.9%	31.8%	-10.8%	1.706	7.321
2019	11.737	4,376.6	35.509	13,241.0	3.6%	4.8%	7.5%	28.8%	-9.4%	1.718	7.416
2020	11.530	4,377.5	32.987	12,523.5	-8.3	3.7%	0.4%	36.6%	-7.7%	2.255	8.088
2021	13.694	5,293.2	39.259	15,175.3	13.9	5.1%	13.9%	32.6%	-12.4%	2.606	8.740
2022	14.550	5,726.3	39.918	15,709.5	-4.9	28.5%	30.2%	32.6%	-14.3%	3.172	9.593
2023	16.000	6,410.9	42.217	16,915.7	2.0	13.3%	5.0%	35.0%	-12.1%	3.487	10.242

=== Moldovan economy in graphics ===
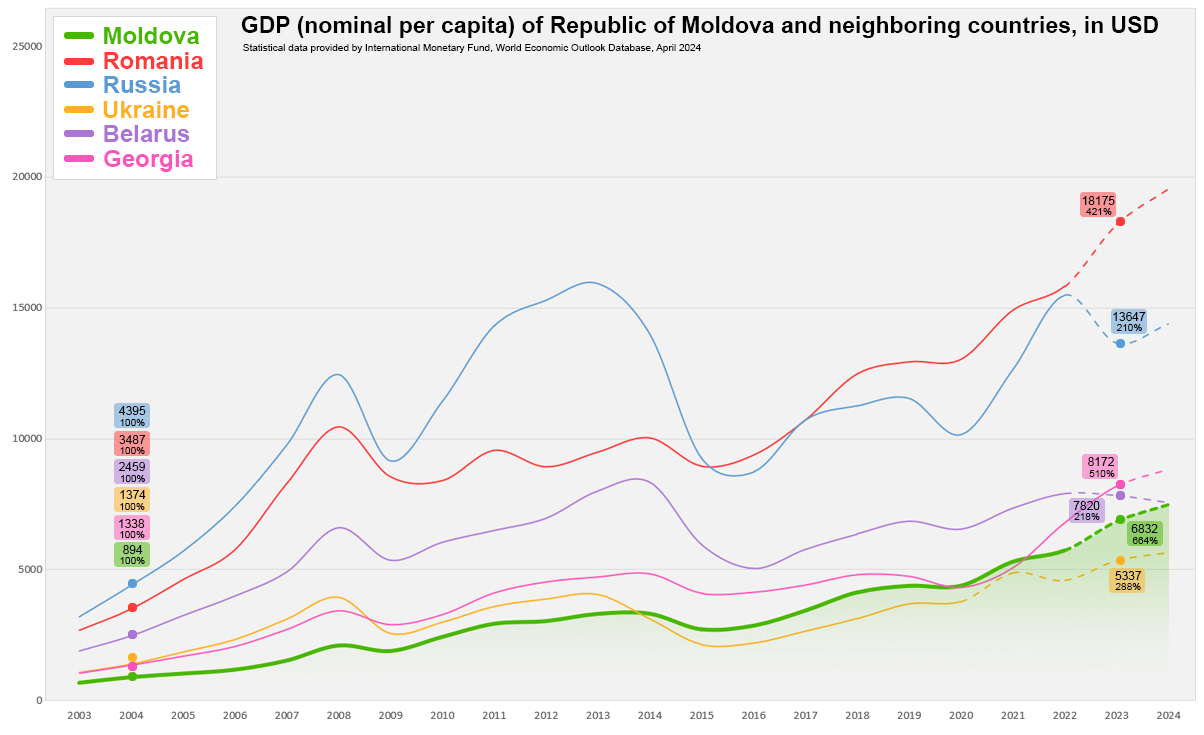
GDP (Nominal per capita) of Moldova and Neighboring Countries

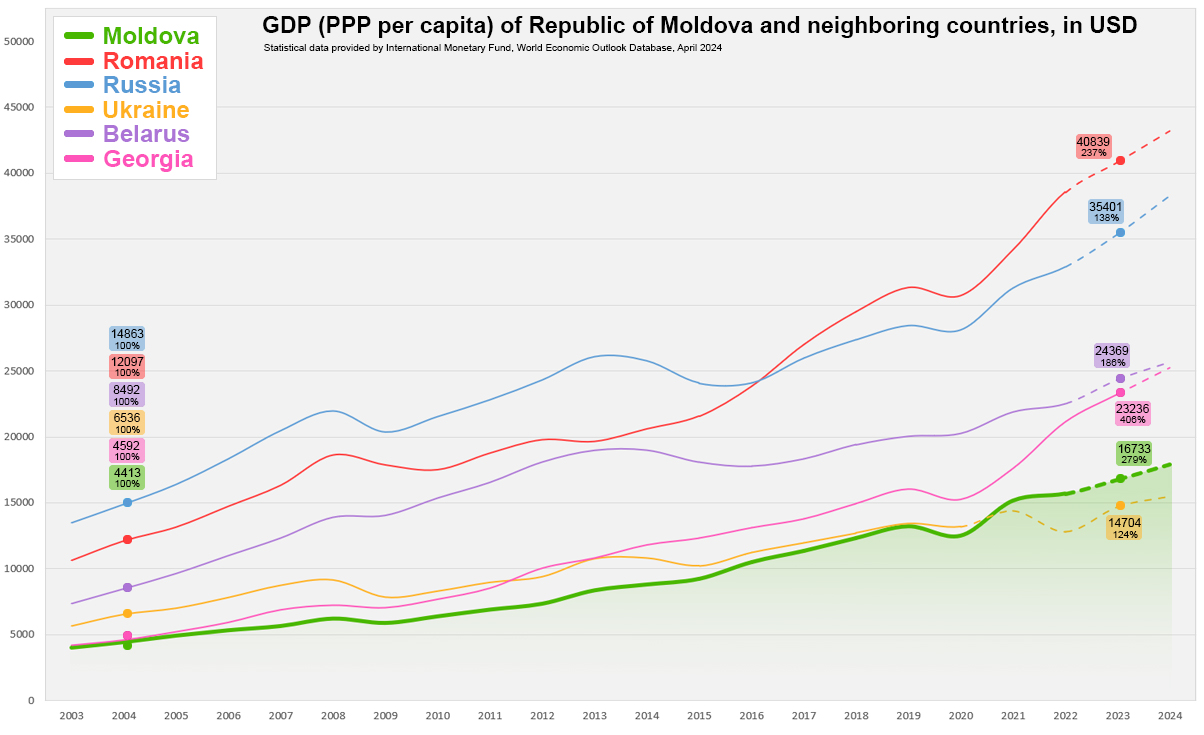
GDP (PPP per capita) of Moldova and Neighboring Countries

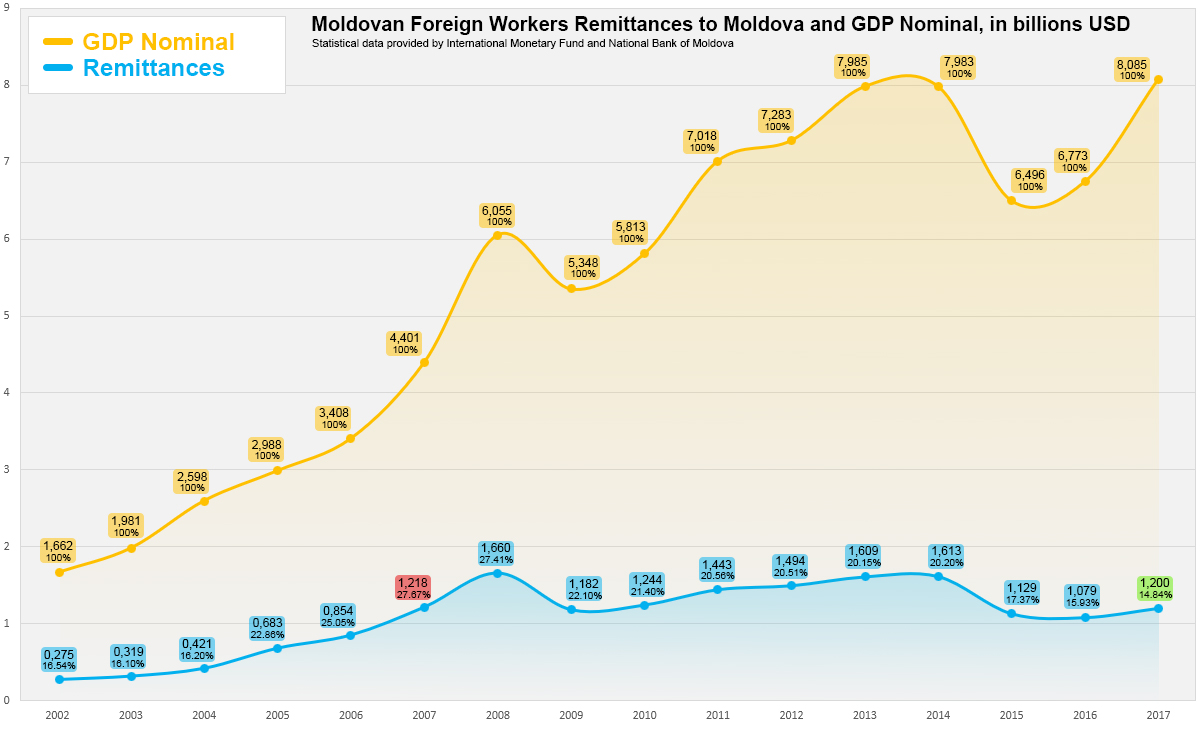
Moldovan Foreign Workers Remittances to Moldova and GDP Nominal

Industrial production growth rate: 3.4% (2017)
Agricultural production growth rate: 2.5% (2018)

== See also ==
- Economy of Transnistria
- Economy of Bălți
- Corruption in Moldova
- Ministry of Economic Development and Digitalization
- Ministry of Finance (Moldova)
- Ministry of Infrastructure and Regional Development (Moldova)
- Ministry of Labour and Social Protection (Moldova)
- National Bank of Moldova
- National Trade Union Confederation of Moldova
- Poverty in Moldova
- Russian Laundromat
- Economy of Europe
