= Saakow =

- Town
- Location in Somalia.
- Coordinates: 1°38′39″N 42°27′4″E
- Country: Somalia
- Region: Jubaland
- District: Sakow

Government
  - Control: Al-Shabaab

Area
  - Total: 25 km^{2} (9.7 sq mi)
- Time zone: UTC+3 (EAT)
- Area code: +252

Saakow is a town in southern Somalia and is located in the Middle Juba (Jubbada Dhexe) region of Somalia. It lies between Bu'ale, Dinsoor and Bardera. It is inhabited by the Rahanweyn tribe.

== See also ==
- History of Somalia
- Jubaland
- Middle Juba
