= Sakow District =

Sakow
- District
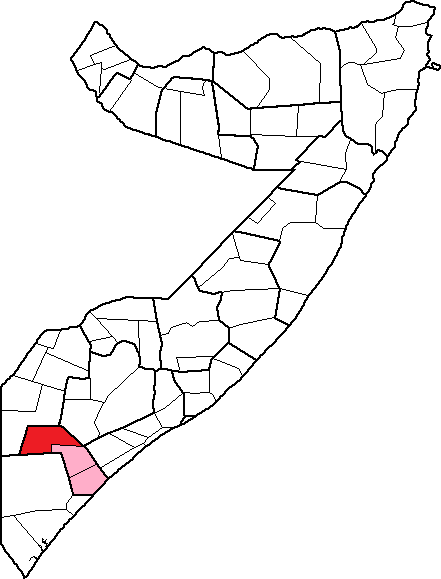
- Country: Somalia
- Region: Middle Juba
- Capital: Saakow

Government
  - Control: Al-Shabaab
- Time zone: UTC+3 (EAT)

Sakow District (Somali: Degmada Saakow) is a district in the southern Middle Juba (Jubbada Dhexe) of Somalia.
