= Southern Development Region =

Coordinates: 46°29′42″N 28°38′04″E

Southern Development Region Regiunea de Dezvoltare Sud (Romanian)
- Development Region
- Location of the Southern Development Region
- Country: Moldova

Area
  - Total: 7,379 km^{2} (2,849 sq mi)

Population (2013)
  - Total: 537,182
  - Density: 72.80/km^{2} (188.5/sq mi)

GDP
  - Total: leu 17.554 billion (€0.9 billion) (4th)
  - Per capita: €1,600

The Southern Development Region (Regiunea de Dezvoltare Sud) is one of the three regions of Moldova. It incorporates the southern portions of the country, except the territories of the autonomous region of Gagauzia. Spread over an area of 7,372 km^{2} (2,846 sq mi), the region includes eight of the 32 districts in Moldova. The districts are in turn organized into 177 communes which incorporate 294 towns and villages. With a population of over 0.53 million in 2013, it is the least populated of the three regions of Moldova.

== History ==
The region has been populated since the Paleolithic age, with the later cultures of Cucuteni-Tripolie and Dacian spread across the region in the fifth to first centuries BCE. In the first century CE, the region was conquered by Roman Emperor Trajan, and the region was influenced by Roman culture. The region was at the cross roads of various rulers after the fall of Roman Empire, and was finally part of the Moldovan state formed in 14th century CE by Bogdan I.

In the 15th century CE, the region which formed part of Bessarabia, was occupied by the Ottoman Empire. While the Russians captured the region briefly in the 18th century, the Treaty of Bucharest (1812) gave control of part of the region to the Russian Empire. After the First World War, Sfatul Tarii declared independence, and united the region with Romania. Before the start of the Second World War in 1940, the region was annexed by Soviet Union as a part of the Ribbentrop-Molotov Pact of 1939. During the war, the region interchanged between the Romanians and the Soviets, before becoming part of the Soviet after the war. The region became part of independent Moldova only after the dissolution of Soviet Union in the early 1990s.

== Administration ==
Moldova is divided into three regions, apart from the capital region of Chișinău, the autonomous region of Gagauzia and the uncontrolled territorial unit of Transnistria. These regions incorporate 32 districts and one municipal region. The districts form the first level administrative units, and the regions are used for statistical and planning purposes. The Southern Regional Development Agency is responsible for planning in the region.

The Southern Development Region includes eight districts–Basarabeasca, Cahul, Cantemir, Căușeni, Cimișlia, Leova, Ștefan Vodă, and Taraclia. These districts are organized into 177 communes, which incorporate 294 towns and villages.

District	Seat	Area (km^{2})	Population (2014)	Density (2014)	Towns/ villages
Basarabeasca	Basarabeasca	295	28,842	78.0	10
Cahul	Cahul	1,546	124,907	68.1	55
Cantemir	Cantemir	870	62,257	59.9	51
Căușeni	Căușeni	1,163	91,635	69.8	48
Cimișlia	Cimișlia	923	60,850	53.4	39
Leova	Leova	775	53,340	57.7	39
Ștefan Vodă	Ștefan Vodă	998	71,277	62.2	26
Taraclia	Taraclia	674	44,069	55.4	26

== Geography ==
The Southern Development Region incorporates the southern portions of the country, except the territories of the autonomous region of Gagauzia. Spread over an area of 7,372 km^{2} (2,846 sq mi), it shares international borders with Romania to the west, and Ukraine to the east. It is also bordered by the Central Development Region to the north, Gagauzian territories to the southeast and the breakaway Transnistria to the northeast. While the country is located close to the Black Sea, it does not have direct access to the sea. The only seaport in the country is the Port of Giurgiulesti located in the Cahul district of the region, which gives access to the sea via the Danube river.

== Demographics ==
With a population of over 0.53 million in 2013, it is the least populated of the three regions of Moldova. The population included 265,191 males and 264,523 females. The gross domestic product (GDP) of the region was 16.838 billion leu in 2021, accounting for about seven perecent of Moldova economic output.
