= Bu'ale =

Bu'ale بُآلَيْ Bu'aale
- Capital city of Jubaland
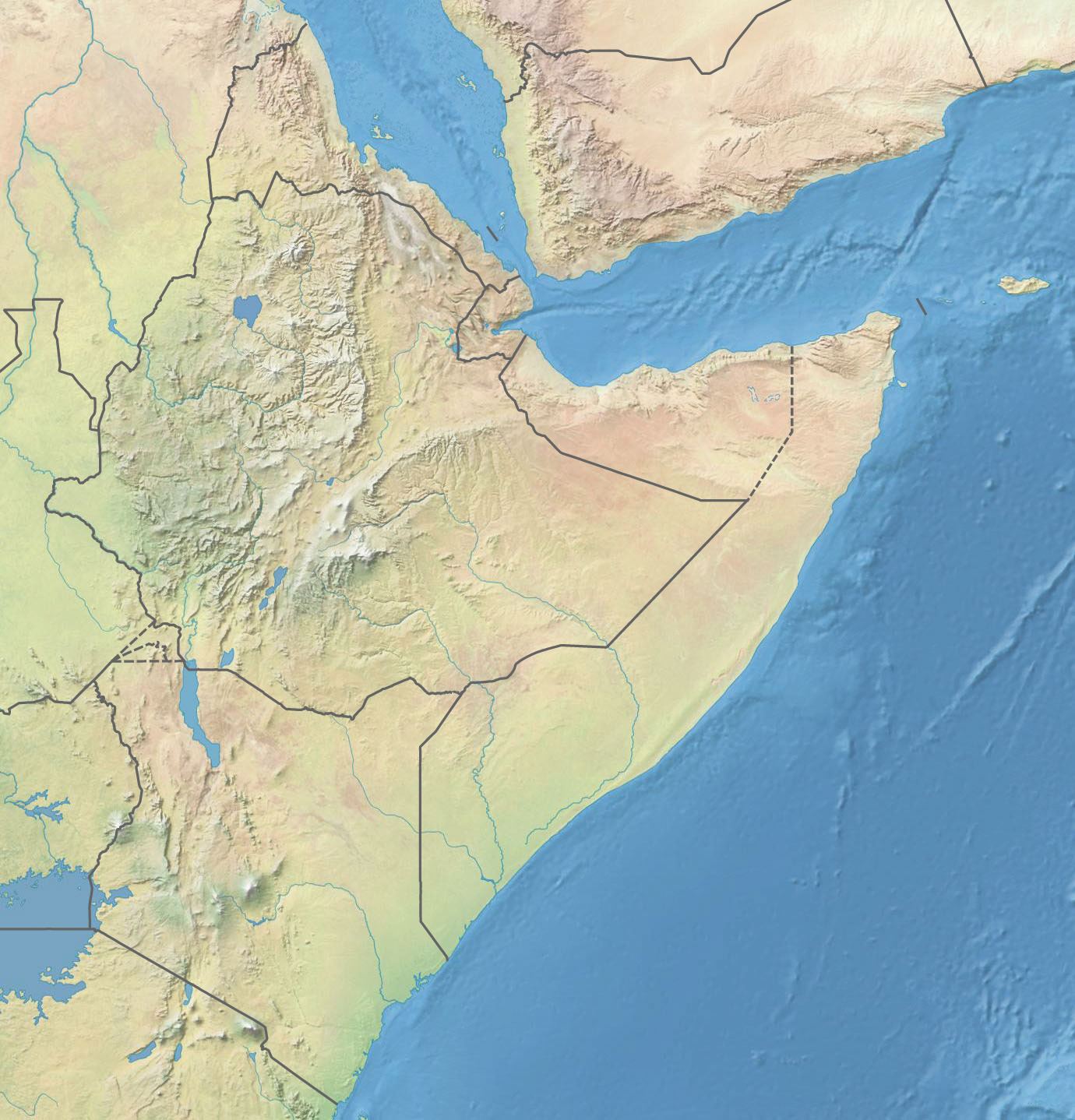
- Location within Somalia Location within the Horn of Africa Location within Africa
- Coordinates: 1°5′0″N 42°35′0″E
- Country: Somalia
- State: Jubaland
- Region: Middle Juba
- Occupation: Al Shabaab

Government
  - Control: Al-Shabaab

Area
  - Total: 30 km^{2} (12 sq mi)

Population (1999)
  - Total: 115,000
- Time zone: UTC+3 (EAT)

Relation map.

Bu'ale (Somali: Bu'aale Arabic: بالي) is an agricultural town in Southern Somalia, the capital of the Middle Juba region and the capital city of the Jubaland State of Somalia from 2013.

Along the Juba River, which flows between Buale and Bardere, there are narrow grain fields. The residents grow maize, onions, and tobacco there. Buale is a major maize-producing area in the Southern Region and supplies maize to most of the neighboring markets. According to a 1990 report, more than 850 hectares of the vast riparian forest along the Juba River between Fanoole and Buale were logged between 1983/84 and 1987, resulting in a 63 percent loss in less than four years; the report states that unless protective measures are promptly introduced and implemented, the forest will likely be gone.

However, it has been under Al-Shabaab control since around 2006. As of April 2026, Bu'ale is one of Al-Shabab's main bases.

== History ==
Before 1991, the population of Buale was approximately 35,000.

Shortly after Siad Barre fled north up the valley in 1991, Buale became one of the first towns to be struck by deadly violence. Former Darod nomads who had turned to militancy killed anyone who resisted as they sought to establish control over the valley.

According to World Vision estimates in June 1996, the total population of Buale District was approximately 33,806, and the number of children under the age of five was estimated to be approximately 6,390 (18.9% of the total population). According to a survey conducted by World Vision in July 1997, the rate of Global acute malnutrition (GAM) had worsened to 32.4%, while the rate of severe acute malnutrition (SAM) was 7.8%.

According to a book published in 1999, this town was ruled by the Aulihan sub-clan of the Ogaden clan.

In June 2000, a sorghum crop failure caused by insufficient rainfall led to an average 25% month-over-month decrease in the amount of sorghum that could be exchanged for one goat.

In July 2001, the Somalia Reconciliation and Restoration Council (SRRC) faction, led by General Mohammed Said Hersi Morgan, occupied Buale. In August 2001, the Juba Valley Alliance (JVA) captured Buale from SRRC.

According to a survey conducted in April 2003, an influx of people driven by family ties brought the population to 50,000.

=== Control by Islamic Courts Union ===
In October 2006, fighting broke out in Bu'ale between the Islamic Courts Union (ICU) and the pro-Somali Juba Valley Alliance, and an ICU commander claimed that the ICU had captured Bu'ale. Meanwhile, the director of the Kenya regional office of the Transitional Federal Government of Somalia maintained that the Somali government still controlled the area. As of December 2006, the areas north of Jilib were still under the control of Islamic militant groups. When the ICU was defeated in its battle against Ethiopia withdrew to Asmara, Eritrea, in early 2007, the remaining Islamic militant groups split into three factions, with Hassan Turki taking charge of the area around the Juba Valley.

In January 2007, the World Food Programme (WFP) and its partner organizations completed the distribution of 1,215 metric tons of food to 59,000 people in Buale District.

In early April 2008, a 69-year-old British researcher working for the Food and Agriculture Organization of the United Nations (FAO) was kidnapped near the town of Buale.

=== Control by al-Shabaab ===
In early 2009, Turki, along with other warlords, formed Hizbul Islam. Al-Shabaab became hostile toward Hizbul Islam and took control of part of the Juba region. In the first half of 2009, a BBC correspondent visited Buale and interviewed a senior Al-Shabaab official. The official welcomed foreign jihadists from Pakistan etc. and explained that the region was peaceful because Sharia (strict Islamic law) was enforced there. Local elders stated that amputations and stonings were not carried out in the area, but advised that it would be best to avoid discussing politics. According to a November 2009 report, WHO doctors were working at the hospital in Buale, where they were receiving more than 200 patients a day from across Central Juba State to provide medical examinations and perform surgeries. The main conditions treated included malnutrition, tuberculosis, and traumatic injuries.

In January 2010, the World Food Programme (WFP) closed its offices in Wajid, Buale, Garbahare, Afmadow, Jilib, and Beledweyne in southern Somalia, citing an escalation of attacks by armed groups. Al-Shabaab had demanded that the organization cease operations by January 1, 2010. In February 2010, Turki's group joined al-Shabaab.

In early November 2011, a spokesperson for the Kenyan military warned that Buale and nine other towns under al-Shabaab control would come under sustained attack. From late October to early November 2011, hundreds of families were forced to flee due to airstrikes by the Kenyan military.

=== De jure capital of Jubaland ===
In 2012, a plan was drawn up to establish Jubaland comprising three regions, the Gedo, the Middle Juba, and the Lower Juba. The Ogaden clan proposed that the state capital be located in Buale, in the Middle Juba. Meanwhile, the Marehan clan proposed Bardere, in the Gedo Region. The 2013 Interim Constitution of Jubaland designated Buale as the capital. However, Buale has occupied by Islamic armed groups, so this measure has no practical effect. Kismayo is the de facto capital of Jubaland.

In June 2014, al-Shabaab arrested about 100 women at a market in Buale, ordered them to wear the niqab, and warned that those who did not comply would be publicly flogged before releasing them. In October 2014, AMISOM announced that it was regaining control of some strongholds from al-Shabaab, which now controlled only six cities, including Buale.

In March 2019, an airstrike on an Al-Shabaab military camp in Buale killed several commanders. In May 2019, it was reported that the vast majority of foreign fighters had left Jilib and Buale. In July 2019, Al-Shabaab executed a man in Buale, accusing him of practicing sorcery.

In March 2020, reports emerged of a conflict between Al-Shabaab leader Ahmed Diriye and his sub-commander Mahad Karate. According to unconfirmed reports, Diriye called Karate's subordinates to Buale and had them killed. On August 28, 2020, Jubaland forces launched an attack on the Buale district, which is under Al-Shabaab control.

In March 2021, five people accused of spying by al-Shabaab were executed in Buale.

As of April 2022, it has been reported that al-Shabaab is based in Jilib and controls Buale and Saakow.

In May 2023, al-Shabaab publicly executed five people in Buale on charges of espionage. In early October 2023, airstrikes carried out by fighter jets and drones believed to belong to the Kenya Defense Forces (KDF) took place in the Buare district. From October to December 2023, heavy rains during the rainy season caused severe flooding in Buale and the surrounding areas.

In October 2025, the Somali government announced that one of the co-founders of al-Shabaab had been killed in a precision airstrike in Buale.

In February 2026, Somalia’s National Intelligence and Security Agency (NISA) conducted an operation in the Arabow area of Buale, killing eight militants and destroying a key Al-Shabaab facility.
