= Economy of Bălți =

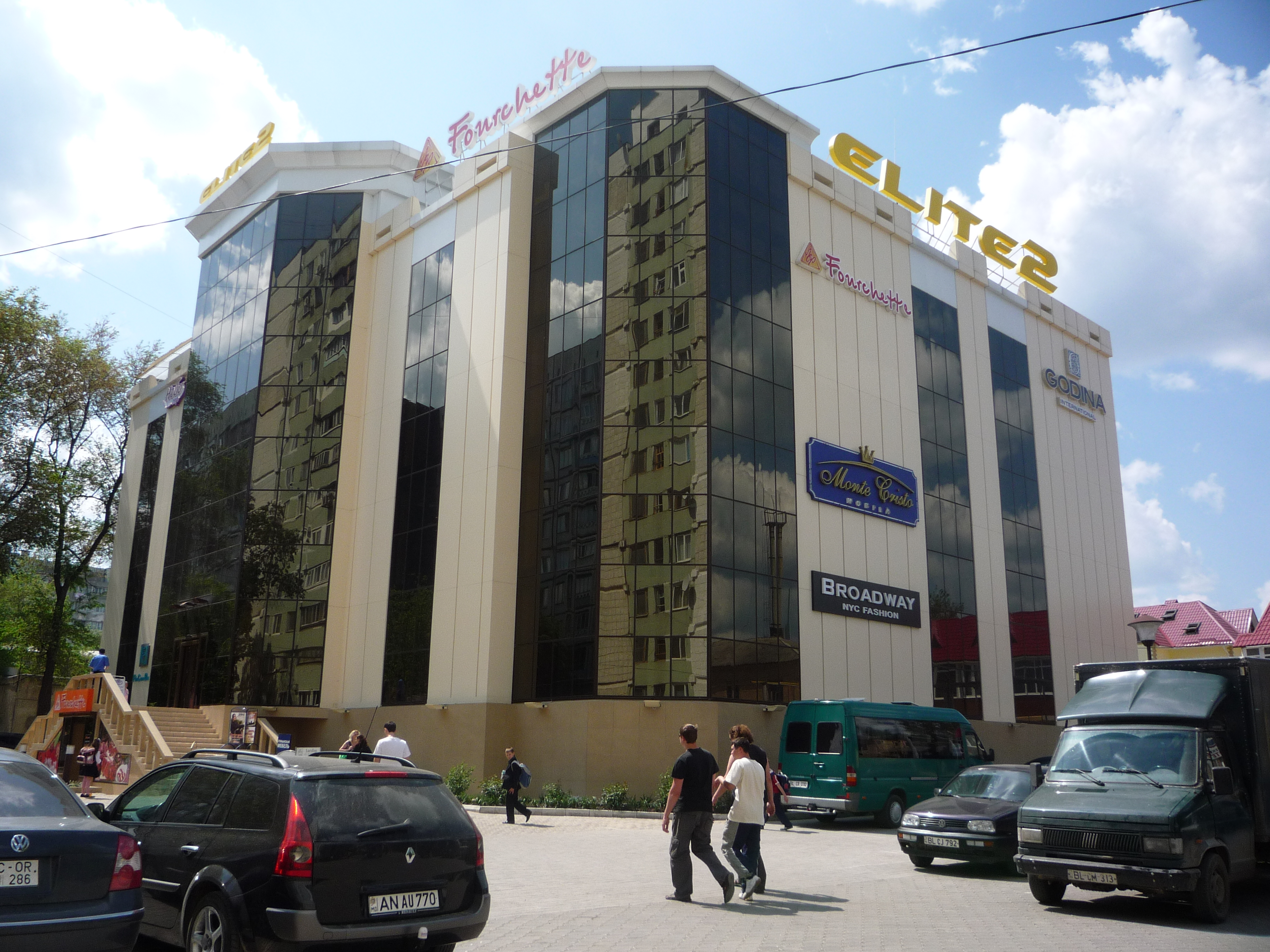

In Bălți, most industries are concerned with processing farm produce, notably flour milling, sugar refining, and wine making, but furniture, agricultural machinery.

== Agriculture ==
Historically, the city was home to vineyards and orchards. It also grew large amounts of tobacco.

== Shopping ==
Bălți is home for major chains such as German Metro Group AG, Ukrainian Fourchette, Moldovan Fidesco.

Numerous shops, can be found in the central (retail), eastern (en gros) and northern (retail) parts of the city. The biggest shopping galleries are located in the centre and in Dacia district (north) of the city. Souvenir boutiques are mostly found around the central square Vasile Alecsandri.

The central market, busy from early morning, and its historical building may offer you just about anything from genuine butcher's products, all varieties of fresh vegetables and fruits, to a new dog.

== Manufacturing ==
This city is an important economic center, with manufacturing playing an important role. Besides traditional for Moldova wine making, sugar, meat processing, flour milling, oil production, and light industry in general, Bălți is the center for manufacturing of agricultural machinery, of various construction materials, fur, textile, chemical and furniture industries. A mammoth Soviet-type conglomerate 8,000-worker factory (called "Lenin" before 1989 and "Răut" afterwards) produced a large variety of machine building products for consumer or industry use, from irons and telephone sets to sonar equipment for Soviet Military submarines.

However, due to swift changes in the economic environment after the breakdown of the Soviet planned economy system, the manufacturing base of the city has severely suffered. However, more recently, new economic ties are being created, with collaboration and direct investment mostly from the European Union.

== Services ==
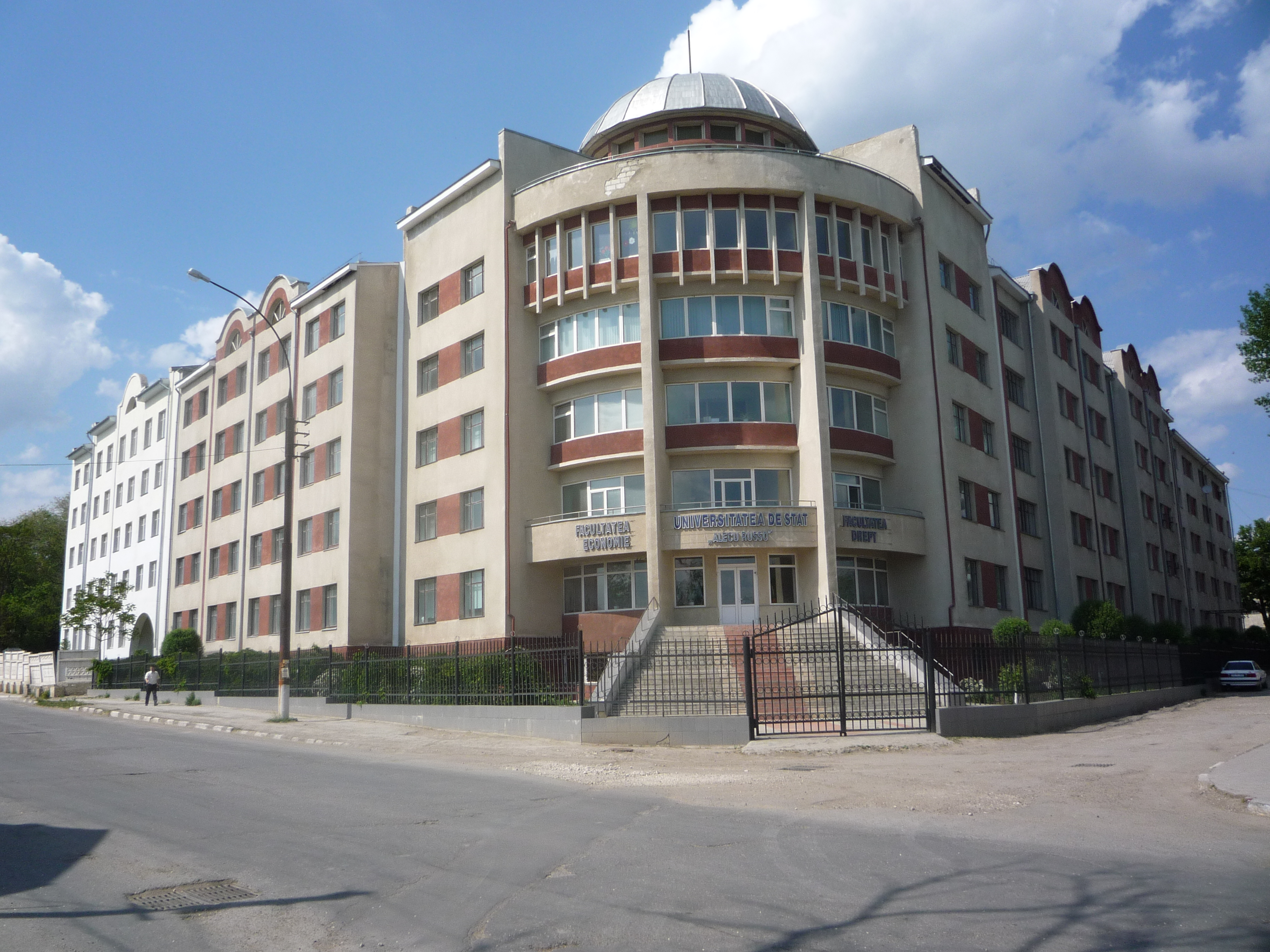
Alecu Russo University

The service sector has developed after 1989 to cover little more than the basic needs of the population. A variety of small private stores and supermarkets opened. Also, there are six public-owned and four private-owned markets; these are places where small-scale businessmen or women can for a tax trade different goods: imported or local-made clothing (quite often counterfeit) or agricultural products from farms in the villages neighboring Bălți. More recently several supermarket chains have started opening stores in the city.

== Energy and utilities ==
The main energy supply of the city comes from the local thermo-electric plant CET Nord, which uses a variety of imported carbon-based fuel (easier to obtain and cheaper than oil). The city is well-connected by high-voltage lines, and there are recent plans for the construction of a new line.

Russian-imported natural gas is distributed to households, generally for cooking, not for heating. But this commodity has recently become a political hazard. Winter heating is distributed in a centralized fashion throughout the city by pipelines.

Although the city was often without electricity and heating during the political hassles of 1994-2001, it has experienced no shortages or interruptions ever since.

The drinking water is supplied into the pipes from a network of local artesian wells (which are insufficient) and from the river Nistru (Dnister) by a 60 km long pipeline connecting Bălți to Soroca (which is not economically feasible).
