= Middle Juba =

Region of Somalia

Middle Juba Jubbada Dhexe Middle Jubba
- Region Jubaland
- Nickname: waamo
- Location in Somalia.
- Coordinates: 0°59′N 42°39′E
- Country: Somalia
- Regional State: Jubaland
- Capital: Bu'ale

Government
  - Type: unknown
  - Control other: al-Shabaab

Area
  - Total: 18,289 km^{2} (7,061 sq mi)

Population (2019)
  - Total: 1,120,200
  - Density: 61.250/km^{2} (158.64/sq mi)
- Time zone: UTC+3 (EAT)
- ISO 3166 code: SO-JD
- HDI (2022): 0.193 low · 18th of 18

Middle Juba (Somali: Jubbada Dhexe, Arabic: جوبا الأوسط, Italian: Medio Giuba) is an administrative region (gobol) in southern Somalia. With its capital at Bu'aale, it is located in the autonomous Jubaland region.

Middle Juba is bordered by the Somali regions of Gedo, Bay, Lower Shabelle (Shabellaha Hoose), and Lower Juba (Jubbada Hoose) and the Indian Ocean. The region is named after the Jubba River that runs through it.

The region's economy is largely based on agricultural production, and its products are sesame, corn, millet, beans, sorghum, and large fruits.

Middle Juba is the only region in Somalia to be fully controlled by Al-Shabaab, a militant Islamic extremist group. As of 2022, Middle Juba has the lowest Human Development Index score in the world out of 1,790 subnational regions.

== Districts ==
Middle Juba consists of three districts:

- Bu'ale District
- Jilib District
- Sakow District
