= Northern Development Region =

Northern Development Region Regiunea de Dezvoltare Nord (Romanian)
- Development Region
- Location of the Northern Development Region
- Country: Moldova
- Districts: List: Bălți Municipality; Briceni; Edineț; Dondușeni; Drochia; Fălești; Florești; Glodeni; Ocnița; Rîșcani; Sîngerei; Soroca

Area
  - Total: 10,375 km^{2} (4,006 sq mi)

Population (2013)
  - Total: 999,216
  - Density: 96.310/km^{2} (249.44/sq mi)

GDP
  - Total: leu 39.534 billion (€2.0 billion) (3rd)
  - Per capita: €2,000

The Northern Development Region (abbreviated RDN) is a development region in the Republic of Moldova that includes the municipality of Bălți and 11 districts, with an area of approximately 10,014 km^{2}. It represents approximately 33% of the total area. The population is 1,025,000 (28.6% of the total). The urban population of 357,000 represents approximately 35% of the region total. At the same time, 571 localities are located there: 20 cities and 551 rural localities, out of the total of 1679 localities.

== Economy ==
The gross domestic product (GDP) was 37.080 billion leu in 2021, accounting for 15% of Moldova's economic output. The GDP per capita was ~37,000 leu in 2021.
