= Central Development Region =

Central Development Region Regiunea de Dezvoltare Centru (Romanian)
- Development Region
- Location of the Center Development Region
- Country: Moldova

Area
  - Total: 10,636 km^{2} (4,107 sq mi)

Population (2013)
  - Total: 1,060,750
  - Density: 99.732/km^{2} (258.30/sq mi)

GDP
  - Total: leu 39.964 billion (€2.0 billion) (2nd)
  - Per capita: €1,900

The Central Development Region (abbreviated DRC) of the Republic of Moldova includes 13 districts: Anenii Noi, Călăraşi, Criuleni, Dubăsari, Hîncești, Ialoveni, Nisporeni, Orhei, Rezina, Străseni, Șoldănești, Telenești and Ungheni. DRC includes 354 administrative-territorial units: 14 cities and 340 villages (municipalities). The largest city in the region is Ungheni, with a population of 38,100 inhabitants, followed by Orhei – 33,500 inhabitants and Străseni – 21,200 inhabitants. The total number of localities in the region is about 35.6% of the total number of localities in the country, the share of cities being about 23%. In the Center Development Region, most of the urban localities are in the area of direct influence of the Municipality of Chisinau, with a radius of influence of 50-60km, with the exception of the cities of Ungheni, Telenești, Șoldănești, Rezina, which are at distances of 100–130 km .

== Economy ==
The gross domestic product (GDP) of the region was 36.390 billion leu in 2021, accounting for 15% of Moldova economic output. GDP per capita was around 34,300 leu.
