= Al-Andalus (disambiguation) =

Al-Andalus refers to the area of the Iberian Peninsula during Muslim rule.

Al-Andalus may refer to:

== Places ==
- Al-Andalus (Kuwait), an area in Kuwait City, Kuwait
- Al-Andalus Mosque, a mosque in Málaga, Spain
- Al-Andalus University for Medical Sciences, a private university for medical studies in Al-Qadmus, Syria
- Al-Andalusia mall, a mall situated in Gaza City, Palestine.
- Al-Andalusian palatial complex and neighborhood of San Esteban, an archeological in Murcia, Spain.
- Andalusia, a modern-day Autonomous community of Spain.

== Groups & Organizations ==
- Al-Andalus Ensemble, a band that creates Andalusi classical music.
- Al-Andalus Media, a media foundation associated with Al-Qaeda in the Islamic Maghreb.
- Radio al-Andalus, a radio station controlled by Al-Shabaab
- Al Andalus Private Schools Qatar, a school district in Qatar.
- Al Andalus Tobruk, a Libyan soccer club.

== See also ==
- Andalusia (disambiguation)
- Andalus
