= Andalusia (disambiguation) =

Andalusia (Spanish: Andalucía) is an autonomous community of Spain.

Andalusia or Andalucía may also refer to:

== Places ==
=== United States ===
- Andalusia, Alabama
- The Andalusia (Los Angeles, California), a historic apartment building in Hollywood
- Andalusia, Florida
- Andalusia (Milledgeville, Georgia), the home of Flannery O'Connor, listed on the National Register of Historic Places
- Andalusia, Illinois
- Andalusia, Pennsylvania
  - Andalusia (estate), also known as the Nicholas Biddle Estate, Pennsylvania
- Hendren Farm, also known as Andalusia

=== Other places ===
- Al-Andalus, the Arabic name of the Iberian Peninsula, especially its southern part
  - Four Kingdoms of Andalusia, the southern kingdoms of Castile which were conquered from the former Al-Andalus
- Andalucia (Jordan), a gated community near Amman
- Andalucía, Valle del Cauca, Colombia
- Point Andalusia, a location in the Southern Atlantic Ocean

== Music ==
- Andalucia (IV of Spades album), 2025
- Andalucia (Tito & Tarantula album), 2002
- "Andalucia" (John Cale song), a song on the 1973 album Paris 1919
- "Andalucia" (Doves song), a song on the 2010 compilation album The Places Between: The Best of Doves
- "Andalucía" or "The Breeze and I", the second part of Ernesto Lecuona's 1928 "Andalucía Suite"
- "Andalucia", a song by Crooked Fingers from the 2005 album Dignity and Shame
- "Andalusia", a song by Shiner from the 2001 album The Egg
- "Andalusia", a song by Joe Satriani featured on the 2008 album Professor Satchafunkilus and the Musterion of Rock
- "Andalusia", a song by Hammock from the 2010 album Chasing After Shadows... Living with the Ghosts

== Films ==
- Andalucia (film), a 2007 French film by Alain Gomis
- Andalusia (film), a 1951 French-Spanish musical film directed by Robert Vernay

== Other uses ==
- Andalucía (cycling team), a Spanish cycling team
- Andalucia (Excavata), a genus of protozoans

== See also ==
- Andalasia, a fictional setting in the 2007 film Enchanted
- Andalusian (disambiguation)
- Andalus (disambiguation)
- Al-Andalus (disambiguation)
