= Flag of the Islamic State =

Islamic State
- Black Banner, Black Standard
- Use: National flag and war flag
- Adopted: c. 2007
- Designed by: Anonymous Islamic State of Iraq members
- Variant without the hamzas below the alifs, which was also widely used

- Variant with inverted colors

The Islamic State has used a variety of symbols since its formation, the most recognizable of which is its flag. The flag was first seen in c. 2007 in a video by Al-Fajr Media, a media center of al-Qaeda.

The flag was nicknamed as the "Black Standard" or the "Black Banner". It is seen as a symbol of global jihad by militant groups.

== Symbolism ==
The flag of the Islamic State is black and white. At the top is the inscription in white: "There is no god but Allah." At the bottom is a white circle with the inscription in black: "Muhammad is the Messenger of Allah", which is meant to resemble the Seal of Muhammad. Anonymous online documents created by the Islamic State confirmed that the circle is a replica of the seal of Muhammad, depicted on ancient letters. However, both the letters and the seal have been confirmed as forgeries by multiple scholars.

The Atlantic noted that although the flag was designed on a computer, the white writing was intentionally made uneven to evoke an old-looking flag, from "an era before the precision of Photoshop".

== Origins and usage ==
“We ask God, praised be He, to make this flag the sole flag for all Muslims. We are certain that it will be the flag of the people of Iraq when they go to aid … the Mahdi at the holy house of God.”

— Islamic State's statement, per The Atlantic

After the foundation of Islamic State of Iraq on October 15, 2006 the militant group did not use any flags or symbols. The first appearance of the Islamic State's flag was captured in a photograph published in January 2007 by al-Qaeda's media center, Al-Fajr Media. In an interview with the media center, multiple anonymous ISI members who created the flag explained its design and inspiration.

One of them, quoting Islamic scripture, said; “The flag of the prophet, peace and blessings be upon him, is a black square made of striped wool”. The members said that Muhammad was reported to have used white, green, and yellow flags, but they concluded that the Islamic State's flag must be black, as they believed he used the black flag more often than the others. The Islamic State uses the flag as a symbol of its government. According to the Islamic State's rhetoric, the flag also represents a "harbinger of the final battle" before the End of Days.

In IS-controlled areas of Iraq and Syria, merchandisers, with the group's permission, produced items such as clothing and rings featuring the Islamic State flag. The flag of the Islamic State is in use by other militant groups across the world, such as al-Shabaab in Somalia, Al-Qaeda in the Arabian Peninsula in Yemen and other groups. Propaganda videos of Boko Haram in Nigeria regularly feature the Islamic State flag. The flag was nicknamed as the "Black Standard" or the "Black Banner" by some.

== Related events ==
=== Protests ===
In August 2014, Egyptian feminist activist Alia Magda posted a photo on social media of her and another person menstruating on the Islamic State flag as an act of protest. Due the Shahada being depicted on the flag, majority of Arab media avoided publishing the picture. She reportedly subsequently received death threats.

After allegation of Islamic State militants beheading two Lebanese soldiers in September 2014, a social media trend named “#Burn ISIS Flag Challenge” went viral. Thousands of users posted videos of them burning Islamic State flags with hashtag "#Burn ISIS Flag Challenge" or "#Burn ISIS". Protests were organized in Lebanon by youth, who filmed themselves setting Islamic State flags on fire as a protest of the group's violent activities. Justice Minister Ashraf Rifi accused the protesters of "insulting Islam" and called for their prosecution for desecrating the Shahada on the flag. Rifi's statement was highly criticized, with one parliament member offering to represent three accused protestors if criminal proceedings were brought against them.

=== Restrictions ===
In August 2014, government of Netherlands banned the flag of the Islamic State from being flown in public demonstrations. In September 2014, Germany banned the Islamic State flag. Austria also banned the flag that same month.

In July 2015, a British man wearing the Islamic State flag and carrying a child also holding the flag of the Islamic State walked near Palace of Westminster; the police did not arrest the man, causing controversy. BBC News later explained that displaying a flag or symbol of a proscribed organization is not an offense unless it causes reasonable suspicion the person is a member or a supporter of the organization. Boris Johnson, then the mayor of London, said he did not want Islamic State flags to be banned, saying: "I don't want to see any Isis flags flown triumphantly around London but we live in a free country".

In October 2016, a Swedish court ruled that displaying the flag of the Islamic State is legal because, unlike the Nazi flag, it does not constitute "an expression of disrespect towards any ethnic group". In June 2023, the Australian government passed legislation banning the display of both the Islamic State flag and Nazi symbols. On 20 December 2025, following the 2025 Bondi Beach shooting, the government of the state of New South Wales introduced additional laws banning the flag of the Islamic State.

== Analysis ==
In 2015, Islamic scholar William McCants said that the Islamic State “wants to present itself as a state, and states have flags”. He added that the Islamic State flag has become so recognizable to the public that any militant waving a black flag is seen as an Islamic State member. Author Asiem El-Difraori claimed that the Islamic State flag had appropriated a symbol representing all of Islam, in an interview, he said; "They created a logo with an insanely powerful force, and completely trivialised it". Agence France-Presse described the flag as an "instantly recognisable symbol of modern global jihad". The Daily Mirror said that the Islamic State flag no longer symbolises the Islamic State exclusively and is a "generic jihadist flag".

Scholar Magnus Ranstorp, said that the Islamic State's flag design was inspired by other jihadist groups such as al-Qaeda in Iraq, al-Shabaab and al-Qaeda in the Arabian Peninsula, all of which use identical flags. Mustafa Ayad, member of Institute for Strategic Dialogue, said that various Islamist groups are currently using flag of the Islamic State, including ones that are opposed to the group. Vexillologist Ted Kaye described the flag of the Islamic State as simple, easily made and recognizable from afar. He said that the Islamic State uses the flag "very effectively", providing strong symbolism at its rallies, parades and other events. He also speculated that the flags were mass produced by the Islamic State, due to all of them looking "pristine".

== Gallery ==
Variations of the Islamic State flag
Variant flag used by al-Qaeda in the Islamic Maghreb and other militants

Variant flag used by al-Shabaab

Variant flag formerly used by the Islamic State of Iraq

Variant flag used by multiple jihadist factions

Variant flag used by Ansar al-Sham

Variant flag used by Takfir wal-Hijra

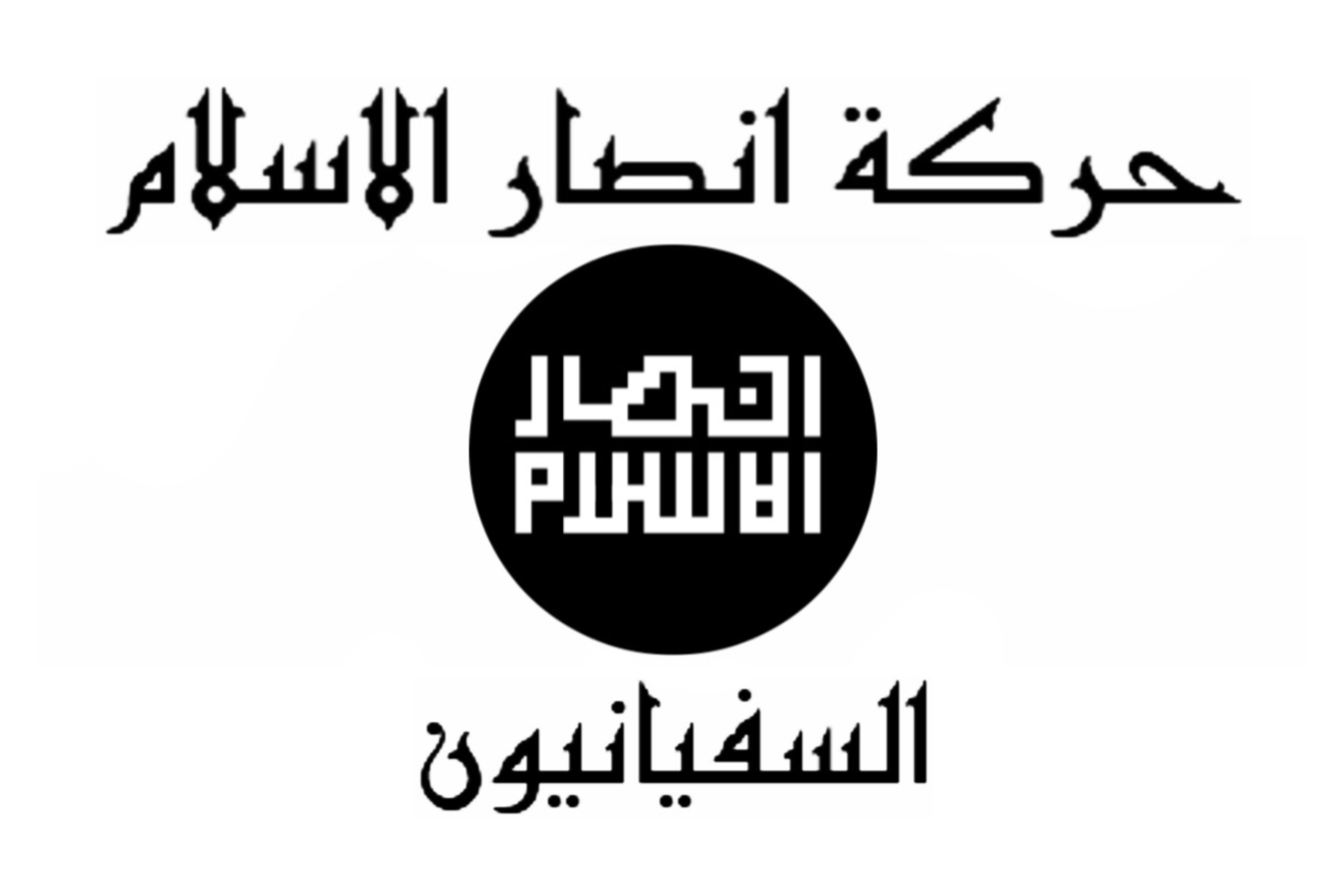
Variant flag used by the Kurdish White Flags

Flag of the Green Battalion

== See also ==
- Jolly Roger
