= Patio del Moro =

Historic house in California, United States

- U.S. National Register of Historic Places
- U.S. Historic district – Contributing property
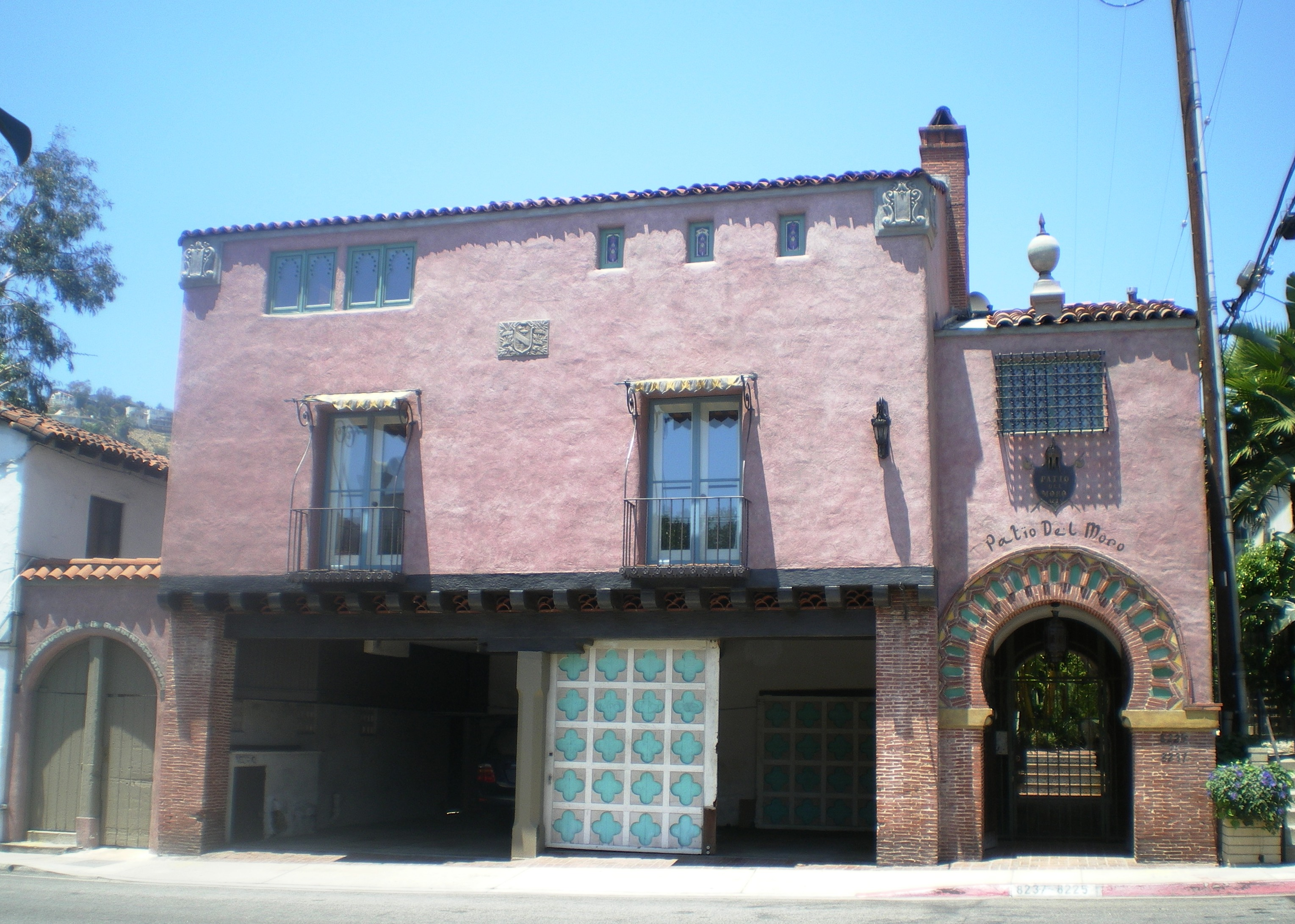
- Patio del Moro in 2008

- Location within California Location within the United States
- Location: 8225--8237 Fountain Avenue, West Hollywood, California
- Coordinates: 34°5′41″N 118°22′3″W
- Area: 0.2 acres (0.081 ha)
- Built: 1925
- Architectural style: Mission/spanish Revival
- Part of: North Harper Avenue Historic District (ID96000694)
- NRHP reference No.: 86002418

Significant dates
- Added to NRHP: September 11, 1986
- Designated CP: May 28, 1996

Patio del Moro is an historic apartment complex located at 8225--8237 Fountain Avenue in West Hollywood, California.

== History ==
The apartment complex was built by Arthur and Nina Zwebell in 1925, and it was designed in the Moorish architectural style. It includes seven maisonette apartments: Villa del Key Moro; La Casita; Casita para una Estrellita; Casa del Sol; Patio del Fuente; Casa del Orienta; and Casa del Alegria.

Past residents include Charlie Chaplin, Paulette Goddard, Joan Fontaine, Humphrey Bogart, Suzanne Pleshette and Joyce Van Patten.

The complex was listed in the National Register of Historic Places in 1986. It was also included as a contributing property in the North Harper Avenue Historic District in 1996.

== Gallery ==
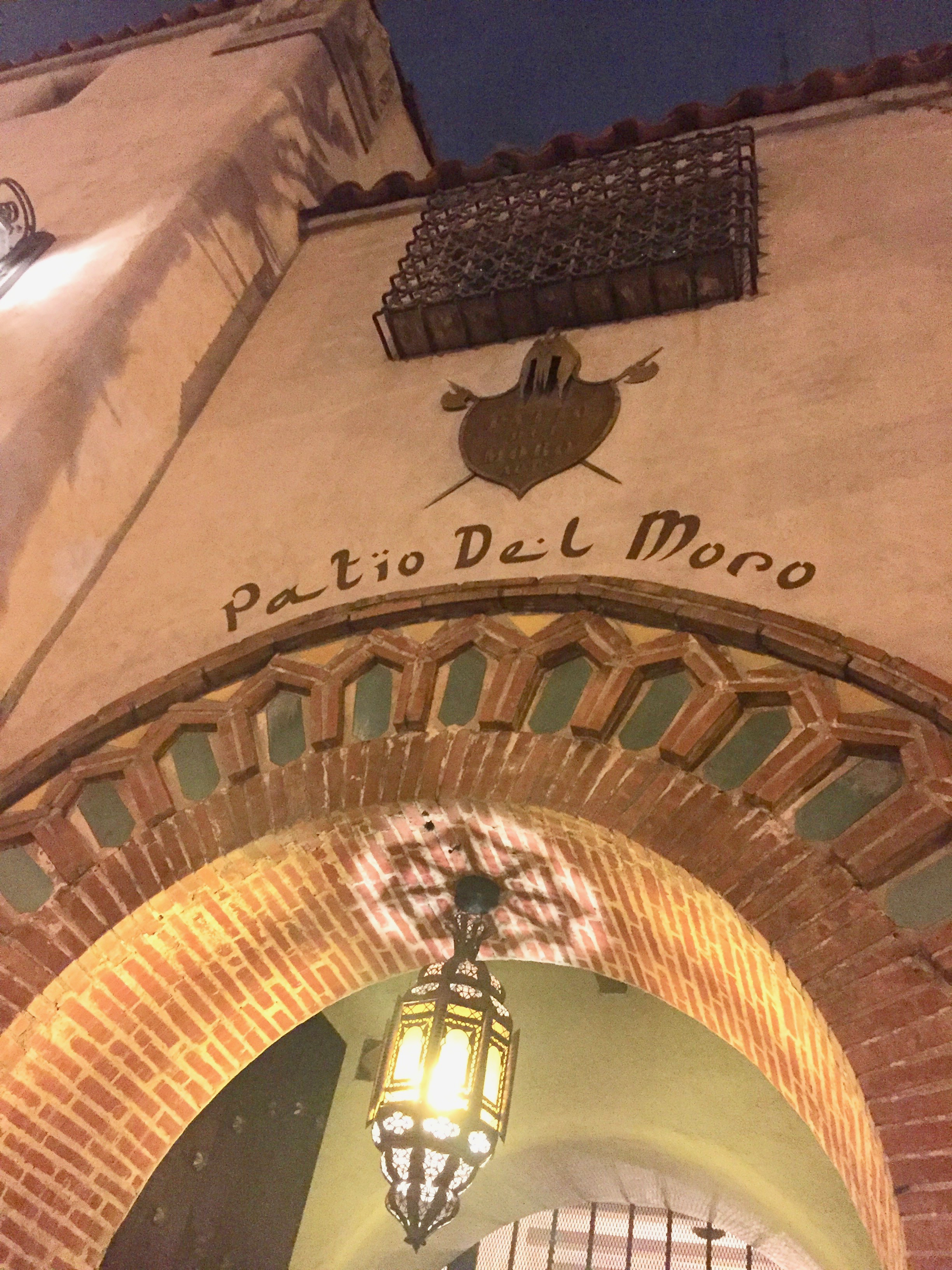
Entryway

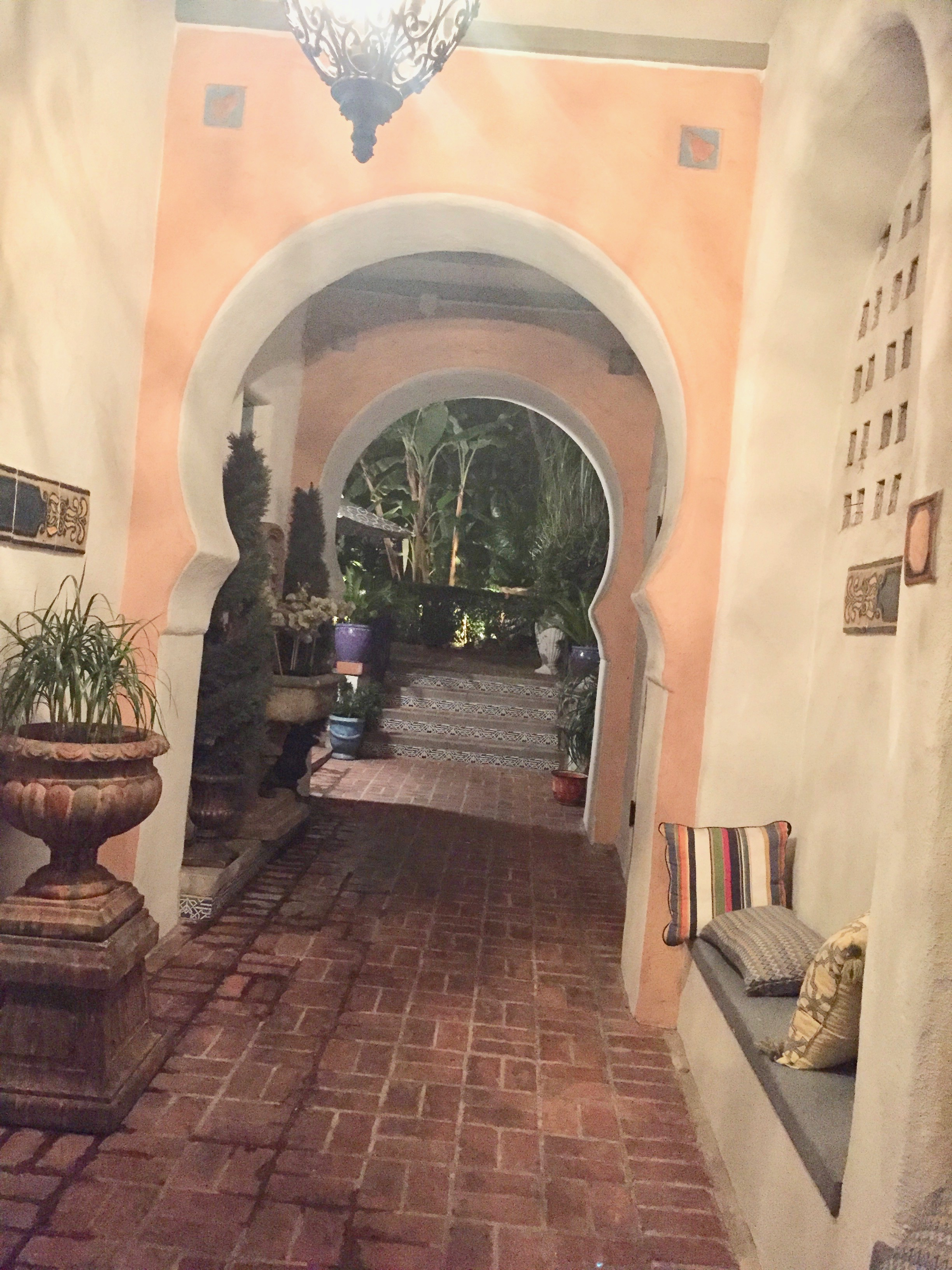
Horseshoe doorways
