= Arthur and Nina Zwebell =

Arthur B. Zwebell (September 27, 1891 – January 29, 1973) and Nina L. Zwebell (January 5, 1895 - March 11, 1976), formerly Nina Jacobson, were a husband and wife design/build team known for their innovation in the design of courtyard apartments in Southern California.

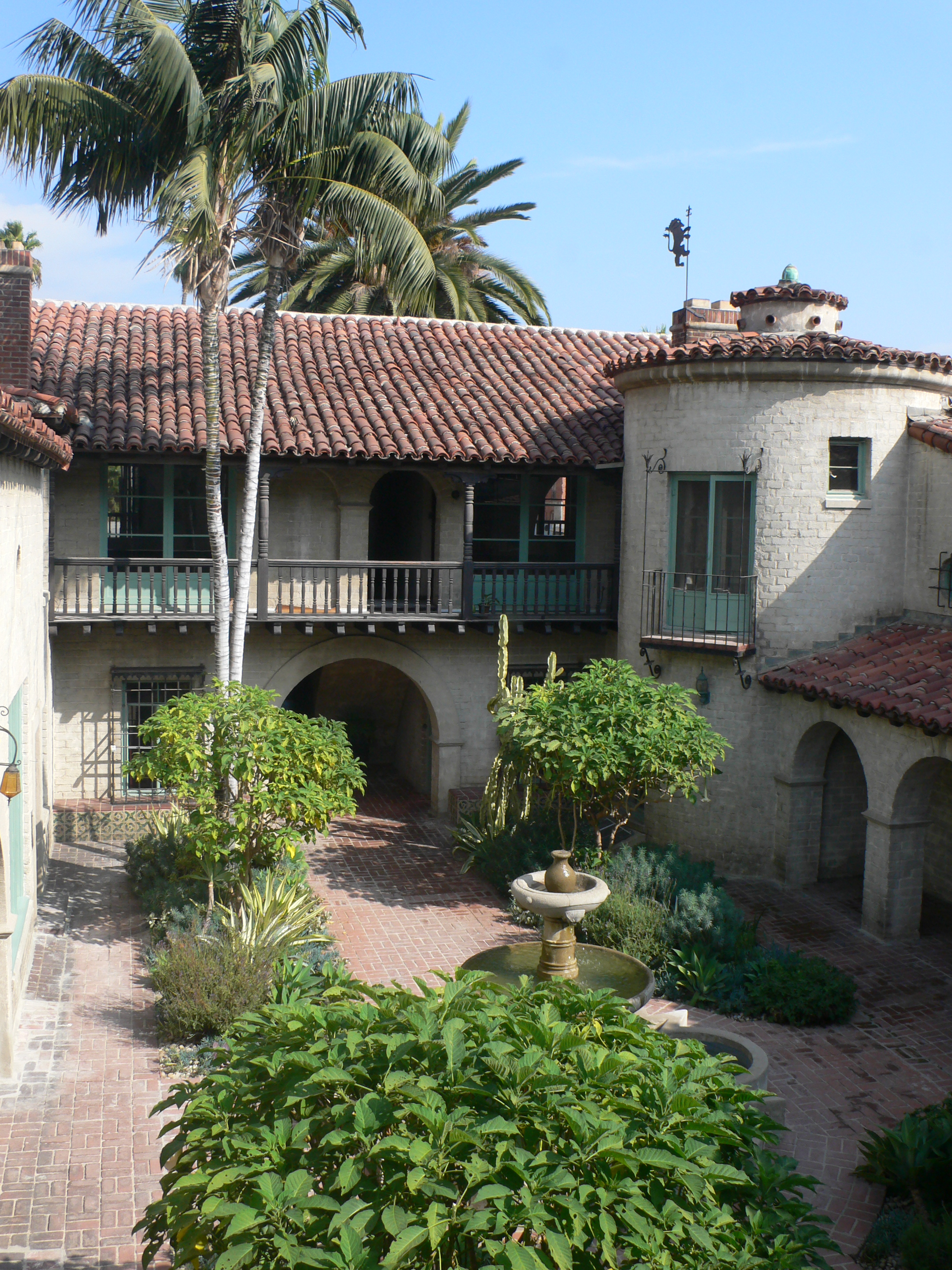
The courtyard, El Cabrillo

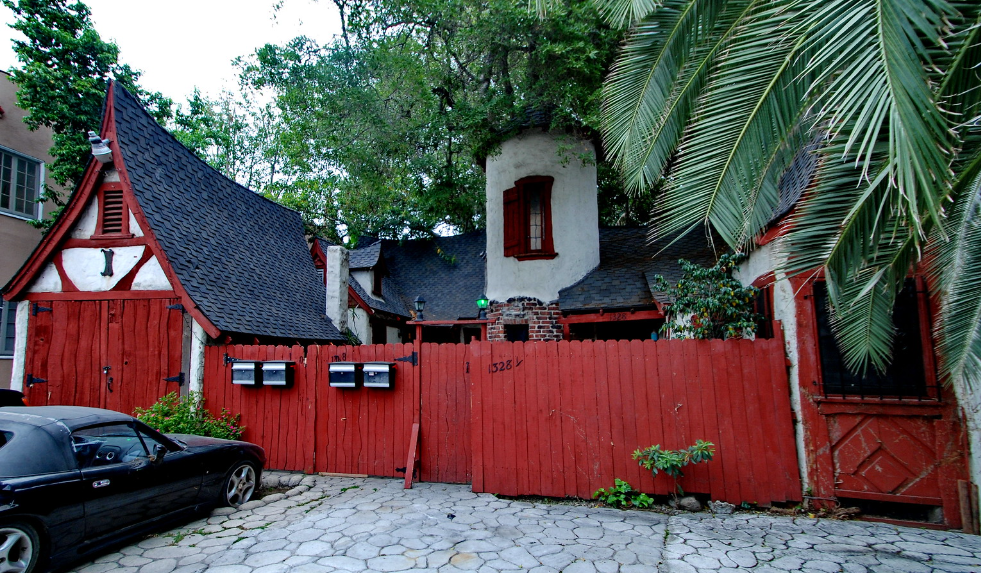
The courtyard, Village Court (1923)

Several of their buildings have been listed on the National Register of Historic Places, including El Cabrillo (1928), at 1832-1850 N. Grace Ave., The Village Court cottages (1923) at 1330 N. Formosa Avenue, Andalusia Apartments (1926–27) at 1471-1475 Havenhurst Drive in Hollywood and West Hollywood, California, as well as the Ronda Apartments, at 1400 Havenhurst Drive, and Patio del Moro (1925), at 8225 Fountain Avenue, both in West Hollywood, California. The Casa Laguna (1928) at 5200 Franklin Avenue in the Los Feliz section of Los Angeles is another well-known example of the Zwebells' courtyard architecture.

Arthur was born in Iowa, and Nina in Illinois. Both died in Los Angeles County, California.
