= Al-Andalus Media =

Jihadist propaganda unit of Al-Qaeda in the Islamic Maghreb

- Native name: مؤسسة الأندلس
- Romanized name: Muʼassasat al-Andalus
- Industry: Jihadist Propaganda
- Founded: April 2010; 16 years ago
- Owner: al-Qaeda in the Islamic Maghreb

Al-Andalus Media (Arabic: مؤسسة الأندلس, romanized: Muʼassasat al-Andalus), also known as Al-Andalus Media Production Foundation (Arabic: مؤسسة الأندلس للإنتاج الإعلامي, romanized: Muʼassasat alʼndlsmʼssh al-Andalus lil-Intāj al-Iʻlāmī) is the Jihadist propaganda unit for the militant organization Al-Qaeda in the Islamic Maghreb that creates video and audio messages that relate to the current conflict and issues with the people, specifically Muslims, in North Africa.

== History ==
The media foundation unit was established in April 2010, named after the Islamic wilayah of Al-Andalus, first releasing the video series "Shadows of Swords", with the video showing the attacks against Algerian soldiers and French soldiers and the addressing issues of Muslims in Algeria, Niger, and Libya. The first video shows operations against Algerian police and military forces with clips of audio and visual representations of Abu Yahya al-Libi and Ayman al-Zawahiri. The establishment of Al-Andalus Media as the official media wing of Al-Qaeda in the Islamic Maghreb came in with the same as sister-foundations of As-Sahab, Al-Malahem Media, and Al-Kataib Media Foundation. The foundation releases media in English, Arabic, Spanish, and French. While producing media in those four languages, they also provide media through video, audio, images, and text while also providing communications to other terrorist affiliated with Al-Qaeda and Al-Qaeda allied organizations. With news releases, Al-Andalus Media collaborated with Al-Fajr Media for news releases.
