= El Cabrillo =

- U.S. National Register of Historic Places
- Los Angeles Historic-Cultural Monument
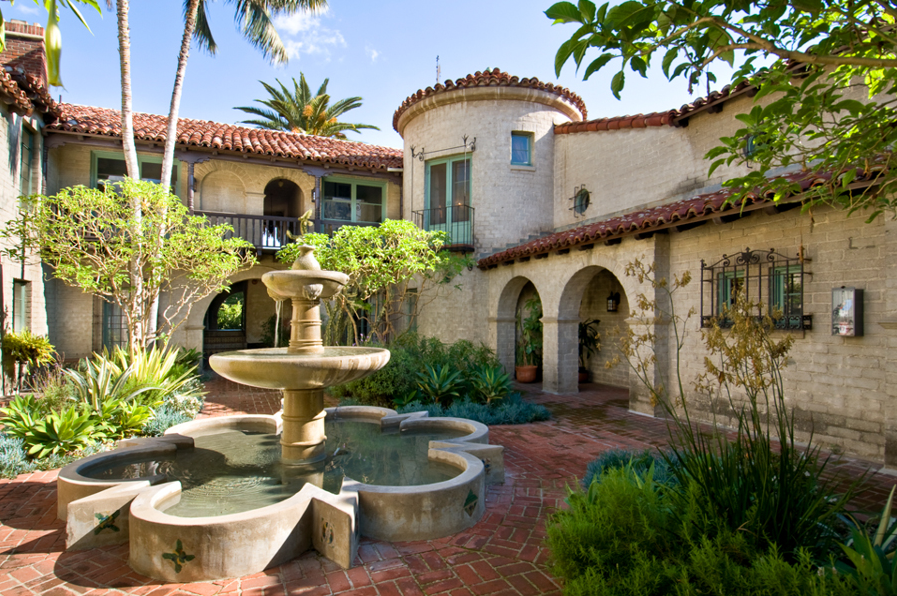
- El Cabrillo in Hollywood, California

- Location within the Los Angeles metropolitan area Location within California Location within the United States
- Location: 1832–1850 N. Grace Ave., Hollywood, California, U.S.
- Coordinates: 34°6′18.3″N 118°19′54.7″W
- Built: 1928
- Architect: Arthur and Nina Zwebell
- Architectural style: Spanish Colonial Revival
- NRHP reference No.: 05000211
- LAHCM No.: 773

Significant dates
- Added to NRHP: March 30, 2005
- Designated LAHCM: December 16, 2003

El Cabrillo is a two-story, ten-unit Spanish-style courtyard condominium building located at the southeast corner of Franklin Avenue and Grace Avenue in Hollywood, Los Angeles, California. The Spanish Colonial Revival style building was designed by architects Arthur and Nina Zwebell and built in 1928 by movie mogul Cecil B. DeMille.

El Cabrillo is the only building designed by the Zwebells using brick, a superior construction material as compared to their other courtyard buildings constructed using stucco and wood. It became one of the most fashionable addresses in Hollywood in the late 1920s and 1930s and has continued its stylish reputation, according to the Los Angeles Times. A sought-after film and television location, it has most recently appeared in HBO's remake of "Perry Mason", Ryan Murphy's "Hollywood", Fox's summer hit show "911" and as the home of the main character in the television series Chuck. It has been designated as a Los Angeles Historic-Cultural Monument and listed in the National Register of Historic Places.

== Ties to Hollywood film business ==
El Cabrillo has a long association with the movie business. In 2007, The Hollywood Reporter described El Cabrillo as a building "steeped in old Hollywood lore," and in 2004, The New York Times called El Cabrillo "a two-story complex that has more fabled than factual stories attached to it, the mark of a true Hollywood star."

The building was built by Cecil B. DeMille in 1928. David Wallace, the author of Lost Hollywood (St. Martin's Press, 2001), believes DeMille built El Cabrillo to house New York stage actors whom he brought to Los Angeles when talking pictures arrived. Others claim that DeMille intended it as a gift for his daughter Frances. Whichever version is correct, DeMille was responsible for a building that became one of the most fashionable addresses in Hollywood. The building's notable features include its Spanish-style courtyard and fountain, hand-made tiles, large fireplaces, and high-beamed ceilings. According to The New York Times, DeMille used set craftsmen to construct "the phantasmagorial sense of architectural detail at El Cabrillo, which includes a central outdoor Moorish fountain, timbered ceilings, Catalina tile work, swashbuckling wrought-iron hardware and scaled-down versions of Citizen Kane-like carved concrete fireplaces in each apartment." David Wallace, who once managed the property, said: "It's like walking into a movie."

Actress Ann Harding leased one of the front apartments in 1928 for $500 per month—a very high rental rate at the time (equivalent to $9,000 in 2025). Other notable residents have included director Lowell Sherman, Perc Westmore, and writer John Willard. Also, the building's Spanish revival courtyard is alleged to have been used as a set in a Rudolph Valentino movie. Located close to DeMille's motion picture studio, El Cabrillo is at the foot of Whitley Heights, where Charles Chaplin and Rudolph Valentino lived in the 1920s.

More recently, the drag performer Divine lived in the complex in the 1960s, as did Kent Warner, a costumer and noted collector of clothing and props from Hollywood films. After Warner died in 1984, the building's owner cleaned out the basement and inadvertently threw out some of Warner's possessions, including James Dean's boots from Rebel Without a Cause and Marlon Brando's leather jacket from The Wild One.

== Architecture ==
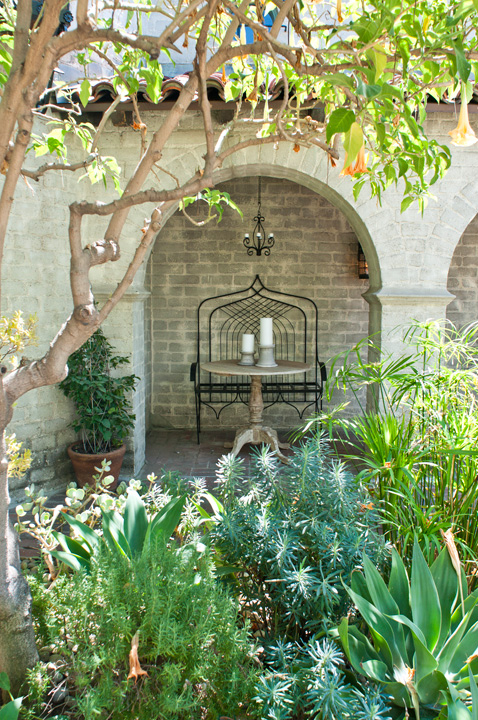
El Cabrillo, Hollywood, CA

El Cabrillo was designed by the husband and wife architect team of Arthur and Nina Zwebell. The Zwebells specialized in Spanish or Hollywood mission courtyard architecture. The building was featured in the 1992 book, "Courtyard Housing in Los Angeles", published by Princeton Architectural Press. The book identifies the Zwebells as important designers in the courtyard housing movement and describes El Cabrillo as an attempt to duplicate their earlier courtyard work with new materials:

"El Cabrillo is not built in wood and stucco, as are virtually all the other Zwebell courts. Instead, a concrete block, nonstandard in size, is used in an apparent attempt to create an adobe block effect. The ten units follow the Zwebell pattern of incorporating two-story living rooms, mezzanines and graceful staircases."

== Later years ==
In 1932, the building became part of a scandal when it was revealed that Superior Court Judge Guerin's daughter and son-in-law were residing at El Cabrillo rent-free, allegedly as part of an arrangement with the receiver for American Mortgage Company; investigations were made by a grand jury and the bar association, but Judge Guerin denied any knowledge of the arrangement.

The building was sold in 1940 by Andrew O. Porter to Lillian Blumkin for $50,000. By 1968, the building had been renamed the Patio Gardens.

As Hollywood deteriorated in the 1970s and 1980s, the neighborhood around El Cabrillo became dangerous. In his book Lost Hollywood, David Wallace noted: "By the late 1980s, the problem had become so bad that those few residents who remained in once-celebrated buildings like El Cabrillo...would often have to lie on the floor to avoid being hit by bullets flying through their windows."

More recently, as the Hollywood area improved, El Cabrillo was renovated and converted into condominiums under its original name. When the conversion was completed in 2006, units were listed at prices in the $800,000 range.

== Use in the television series Chuck ==
In 2007, the building was used as the shooting location for the home of the main character in the pilot of the NBC television series Chuck. The producers wanted to use "a courtyard apartment location that was reminiscent of old Hollywood/Echo Park," and selected El Cabrillo because it "offered many interesting textures – concrete blocks, wood spindle balconies, private balconies, an impressive interior courtyard turret and a courtyard fountain, and provided an amazing background for our characters to interact [in]."

After the series was picked up, the producers concluded it was not feasible to continue shooting on location at El Cabrillo, so the main character's apartment and El Cabrillo's courtyard were recreated, with some design modifications, on a Warner Bros. soundstage.

== Use in the television series Stalker ==
In 2014, Producer Kevin Williamson selected El Cabrillo for the CBS television series Stalker. Stars Dylan McDermott and Maggie Q were filmed walking through the courtyard. McDermott, playing detective Jack Larsen, comments in episode 1 of the first season, "Beautiful place.. I wonder what it costs to live here."

Coincidentally, McDermott had previous history with the place, having starred in the 1997 film 'Til There was You, which used El Cabrillo as the central location and plot point.

== Historic designation ==
The building was designated as a Historic-Cultural Monument (HCM #773) by the Los Angeles Cultural Heritage Commission in 2003. Two years later, in 2005, the building was listed in the National Register of Historic Places.

== See also ==
- Los Angeles Historic-Cultural Monuments in Hollywood
- List of Registered Historic Places in Los Angeles
