= Andalucia (Jordan) =

Andalucia الأندلسية
- Town
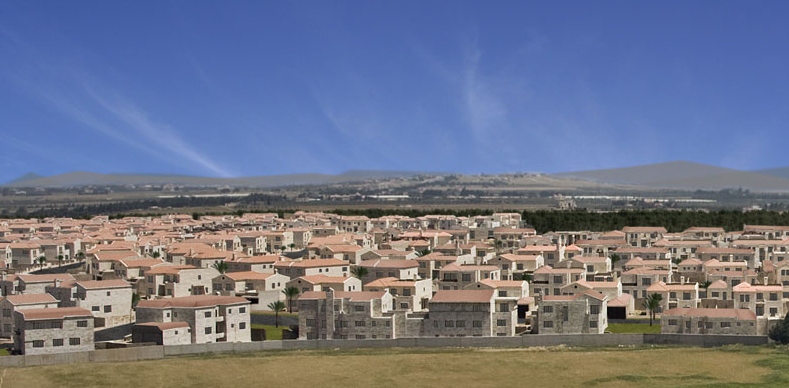
- Overview of Andalucia

- Location in Jordan
- Coordinates: 31°46′N 35°53′E
- Country: Jordan
- Province: Amman Governorate
- Established: 2009
- Time zone: UTC+2 (GMT)
  - Summer (DST): +3
- Website: http://andalucia-jkb.com/

Andalucia (Arabic: الأندلسية; sometimes spelled Al Andalucia) is a town project by Taameer jordan holdings located 20 km away from Amman, Jordan. It is named for the former Muslim kingdom of Al-Andalus (modern Andalusia) in Spain. It is the first Gated Community project to be launched in Jordan. It consists of 588 villas from ten different designs, which take up about 37% of the overall project area, which is 800,000 m² in size. The project was supposed to be completed in 2009, at a total cost of 150,000,000 JOD, but is still to be completed as of June 2012; due to cash flow problems. The project has been marked by delays in completion and failure by Taameer to pay contractors and suppliers. Andalucia is supposed to have many facilities including a health club, shopping centers, restaurants, coffee shops, parks, clinics, as well as indoor and outdoor swimming pools.
