= Al Andalus Private Schools Qatar =

Group of private schools in Qatar

Coordinates: 25°27′29.66″N 51°27′54.29″E

District information
- Type: Private schools group
- Established: 1993; 33 years ago
- Director of education: Dr. Salem Abdelrahman Al Bakri
- Schools: 3

Other information
- Founder: Abdullah bin Khalid Al Thani
- Website: alandalus.qa/eduen.html

Al Andalus Private Schools Qatar is a group of private schools in Qatar comprising three schools encompassing all three levels of education: elementary, primary, and secondary. Its three schools include Al Andalus Elementary Private School for Boys, Al Andalus Preparatory Secondary Private School for Boys, and Al Andalus Private Girls School.

== History ==
The schools were founded in 1993 by Sheikh Abdullah bin Khaled bin Hamad Al Thani under the Ministry of Education. The cost of building the schools totaled approximately $55 million.

In 1998, Dr. Salem Abdelrahman Al Bakri was appointed as director of the schools.

== Leadership ==
Andalus Private Schools is directed by Sheikh Abdullah Bin Khalid Bin Hamad Al Thani. The remaining board members of the school includes Ahmed Abdullah Ghorab Al Marri serving as the Minister of Interior, Sheikh Hamad bin Nasser bin Jassim Al Thani serving as the Minister of Islamic Affairs, and Mansour Mohamed Abdel Fattah Al Moslah as the Minister of State and Internal Affairs.

== Leadership controversies ==
Sheikh Abdullah bin Khaled Al Thani, a member of Qatar’s ruling family, previously served as the minister of religious affairs, and headed the Ministry of Interior until 2013. According to U.S. intelligence officials, he assisted Khaled Sheikh Mohammed in escaping from Qatar when word emerged that U.S. officials were planning to arrest him.
