= The Andalusia (Los Angeles, California) =

- U.S. National Register of Historic Places
- Los Angeles Historic-Cultural Monument
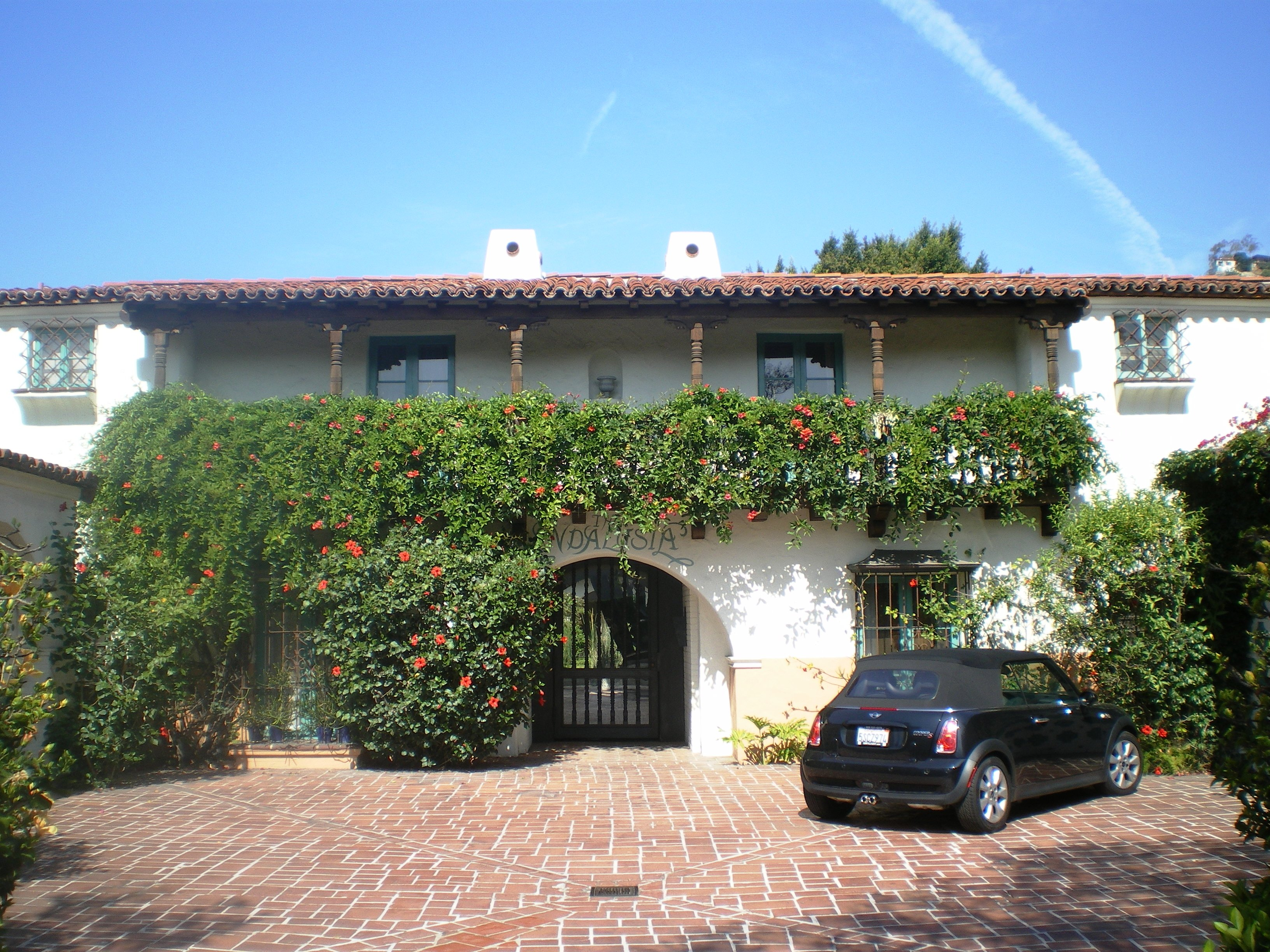
- Andalusia, 2008

- Location within the Los Angeles metropolitan area Location within California Location within the United States
- Location: 1471–1475 Havenhurst Dr., Hollywood, Los Angeles, California
- Coordinates: 34°5′47″N 118°22′1″W
- Built: 1926
- Architect: Arthur and Nina Zwebell
- Architectural style: Spanish Colonial Revival
- NRHP reference No.: 03000775
- LAHCM No.: 435

Significant dates
- Added to NRHP: August 21, 2003
- Designated LAHCM: May 16, 1989

The Andalusia is an apartment building located at 1471-1475 Havenhurst Dr. in Hollywood, Los Angeles, California, built in 1926 in Spanish Colonial Revival style. The building was listed in the National Register of Historic Places in 2003. Additionally, it is designated as Los Angeles Historic Cultural Monument No. 435.

== History ==
Architects Arthur and Nina Zwebell designed the structure around a richly landscaped interior courtyard. Materials used reflected those commonly used in the Spanish Colonial Revival, Mediterranean Revival, Moorish Revival, and Mission Revival traditions: exposed wooden beams, cantilevered beams, carved wood, wrought iron, terracotta roof tiles, lightly textured buff-colored stucco, cast concrete, and brick. Over the years, a cast of actors from the Golden Age of Hollywood lived at the Andalusia, including Sondra Locke, Clara Bow, Marlon Brando, Jean Hagen, John Payne, Teresa Wright, Louis L'Amour, Claire Bloom, and Cesar Romero. Later, actor Jason Schwartzman occupied one of the units. The building is located in a historic neighborhood south of Sunset Boulevard near the Chateau Marmont. The same block of Havenhurst Drive also includes two other apartment buildings listed on the National Register of Historic Places: the Colonial House (1416 Havenhurst Dr.) and the Ronda (1400–1414 Havenhurst Dr.).

== Gallery ==
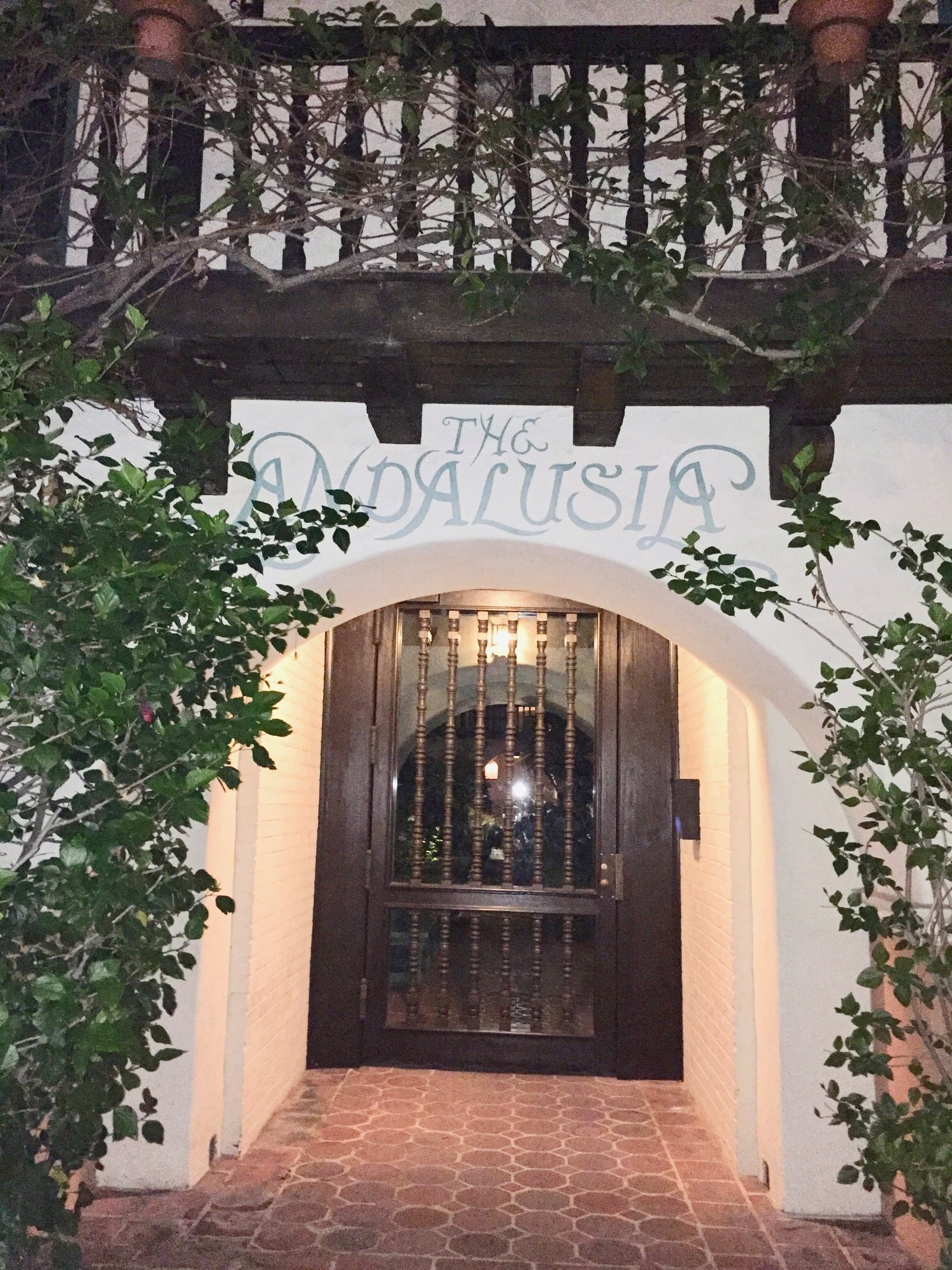
Entryway

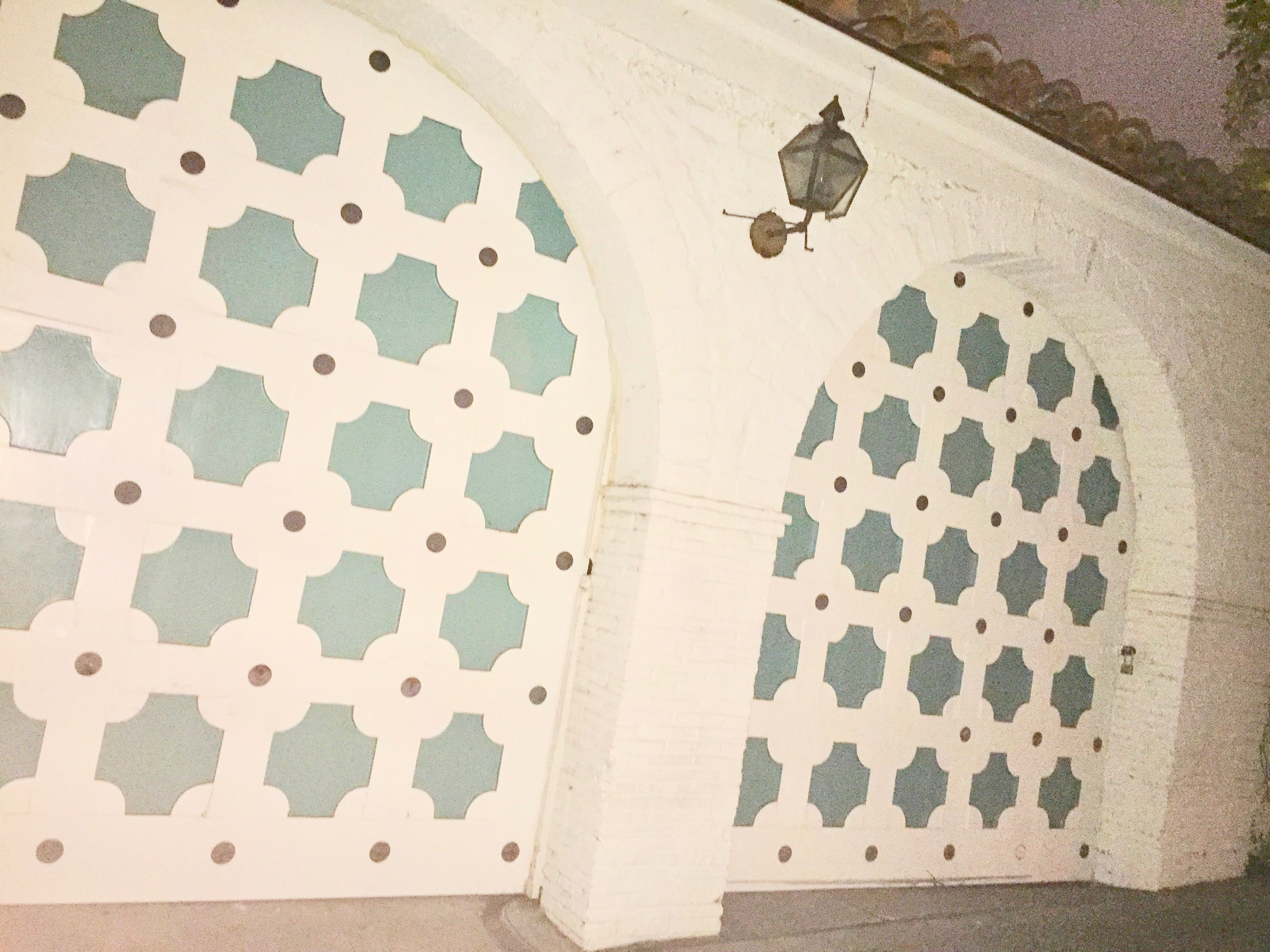
Wall detail

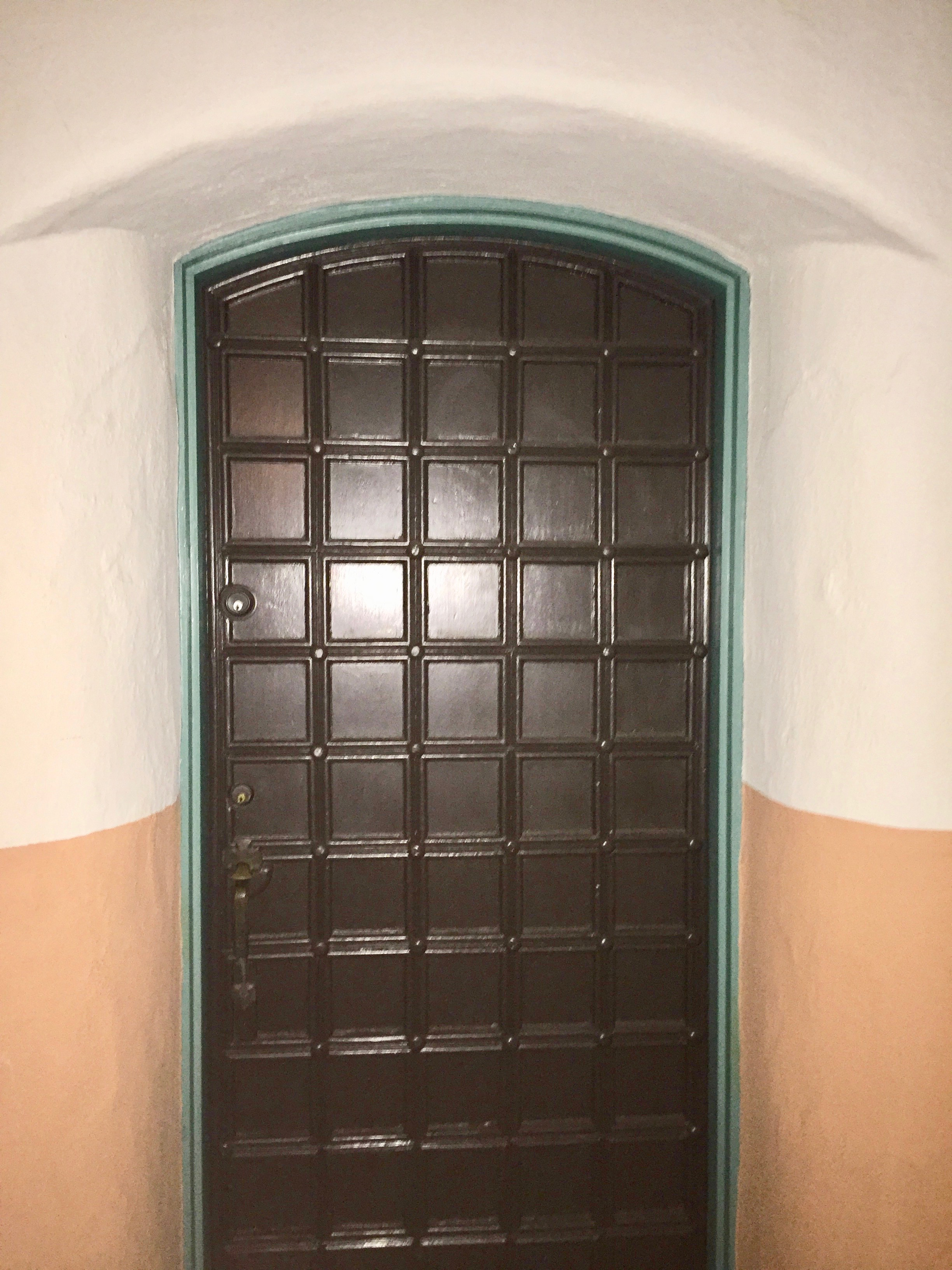
Recessed door at the Andalusia

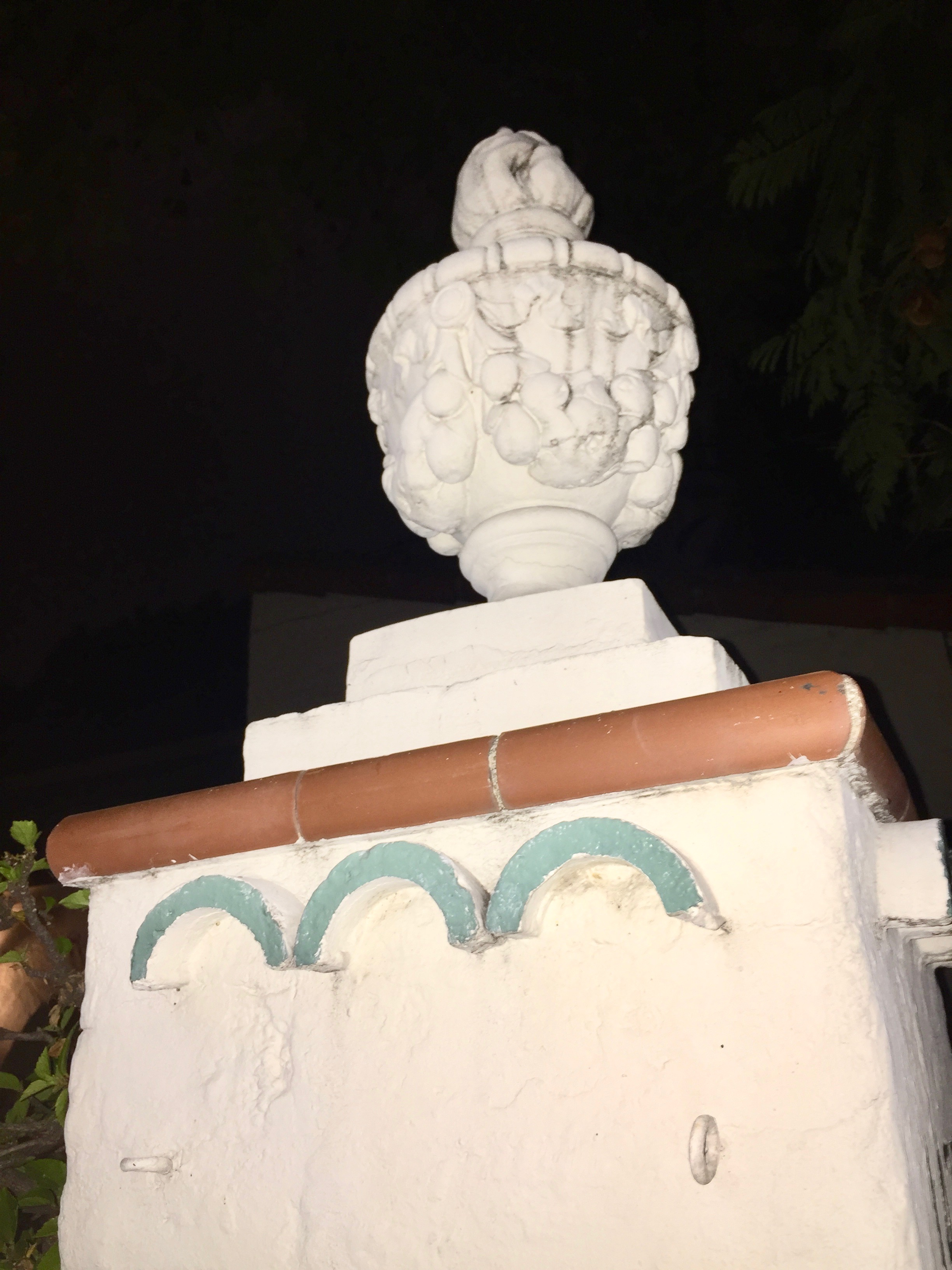
Retaining wall embellishment

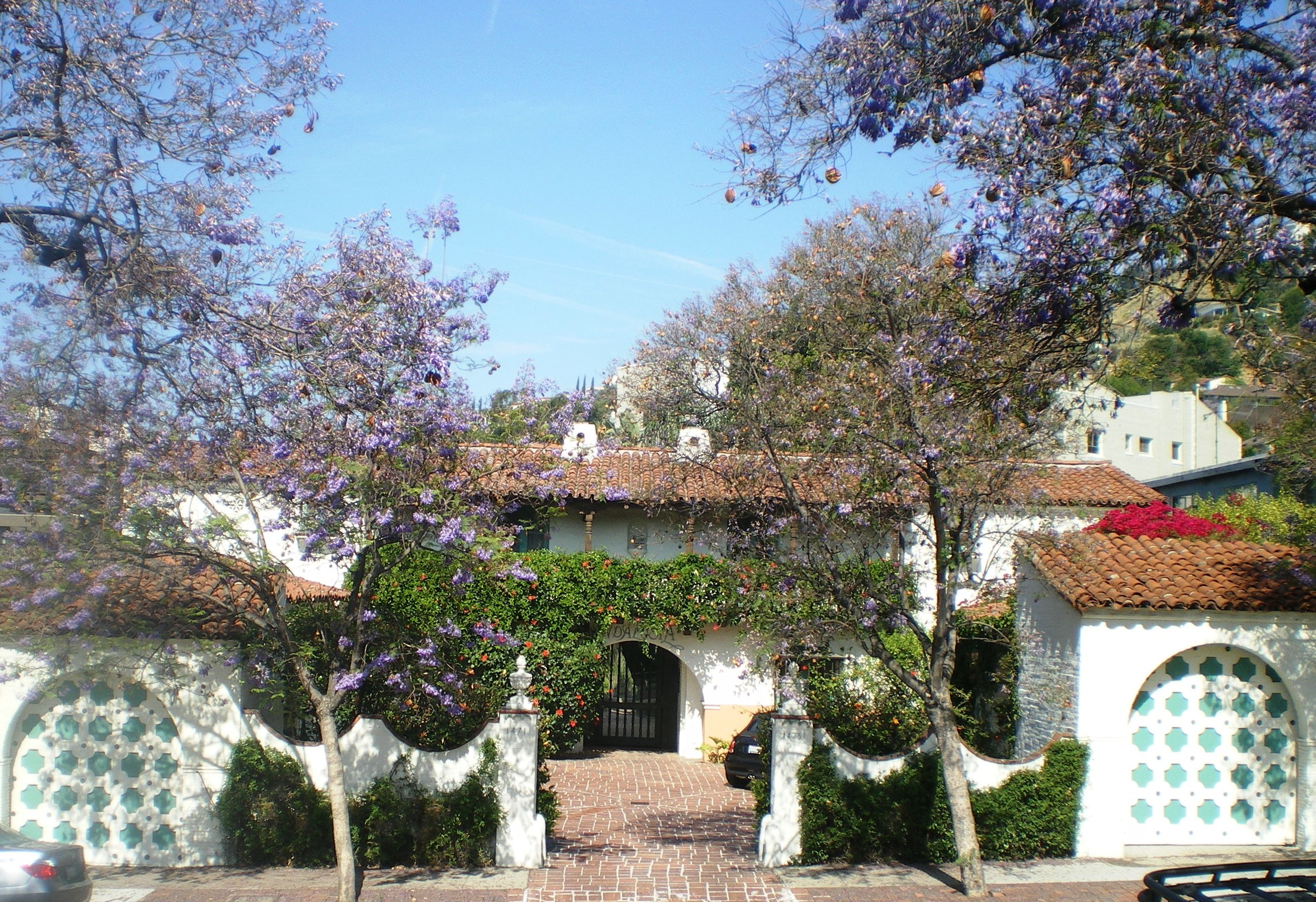
View from the street

== See also ==
- List of Registered Historic Places in Los Angeles
