= Al-Andalus University for Medical Sciences =

University in Qadmus, Syria

Al Andalus University
- جامعـــة الأندلـــس
- Type: Private
- Established: 2005
- President: Abdul Qader Martini
- Location: Qadmus, Tartus, Syria
- Website: Official website

Al-Andalus University for Medical Sciences (Arabic: جامعة الأندلس الخاصة للعلوم الطبية) is a private university based in Qadmus, Syria.

Established in 2005. The university specializes in medical sciences, and runs a number of training hospitals around the country.

== Faculties ==
Currently the university has six faculties :

- Faculty of Human Medicine
- Faculty of Dentistry
- Faculty of Pharmacy
- Faculty of Medical Engineering
- Faculty of Nursing
- Faculty of Hospital Management

== Description ==
Al Andalus University for Medical Sciences is a private higher education institution, exists in the Syrian Arab Republic under the provisions of Presidential Decree No. (191) Date 6/5/2005, and linked to the Ministry of Higher Education within the limits provided by Legislative Decree No. (36) Dated 16/8/2001.

AU is an independent scientific academic institution working to achieve the goals of higher education and scientific research in the Syrian Arab Republic, and shall for this purpose, not inconsistence with the in forced laws or the political objectives of the Syrian Arab Republic:

- Develop curricula and programs of study and research plans.
- Holding exams.
- Awarding honor degrees, specialized certificates, and postgraduate.
- Set detailed organizational structure and recruitment configurations as needed in its scientific, technical, administrative, and other places. And employ the occupants of these jobs in accordance with its regulations.
- The degrees awarded by the university offset by the judgment of scientific degrees awarded by universities and government institutes in the Syrian Arab Republic.

AU aims to achieve progress in the fields of science, technology and medical practices, and support achieving objectives like deployment and development of human civilization, Expand the horizons of human knowledge, and contributes in the realization of the national sufficiency and economic and social development in Syrian Arab Republic and the Arab World, and that will be as follows:

- Preparing specialists in different branches of medical sciences, supporting and providing them with high scale of knowledge and skills that will keep them in pace with science, technology and human civilization.
- Providing opportunities for Syrian, Arab and foreigner students, to complete their studies in our homeland
- Getting back Arab scientists and doctors from the foreignness, and provide them with job opportunities and help them in serving their nation.
- Helping in rising and sharing scientific researches and supporting the contribution in scientific and technical progress especially those aimed at finding solutions to various health issues that are facing economic and social development.
- Developing the means and methods of research, education and pedagogy, including placing and developing the university educational literature with translations and creating laboratories and hospitals that are necessary for scientific research.
- Contribute to the rehabilitation and training courses and constant education.
- Raising student's scientific personality and boosting his passion for work and science.
- Guiding the students toward the ideal choice of the events they will practice in the future.
- Encouraging cultural, social, artistic and sports activities.
- Encouraging the scientific and cultural connections with universities and scientific institutes, whether it was Arabic or international.
- Achieve the highest level of interaction between Al Andalus University and the surrounding community with its economic, social and municipal institutions.
