= Hendren Farm =

Historic house in Missouri, United States

- U.S. National Register of Historic Places
- Location within Missouri Location within the United States
- Location: Route 2, near Hannibal, Missouri
- Coordinates: 39°44′59″N 91°26′27″W
- Area: 1 acre (0.40 ha)
- Built: c. 1835, 1850s
- Built by: Hendren, Samuel O.
- Architectural style: Greek Revival
- NRHP reference No.: 84002587
- Added to NRHP: August 22, 1984

Hendren Farm, also known as Andalusia, is a historic home and farm located near Hannibal, Marion County, Missouri. The main house was built in the 1850s, and is a two-story, T-shaped, vernacular Greek Revival style brick dwelling. It features a one-story, three-bay front porch with a low hip roof supported by four square columns. Also on the property are the contributing clapboarded log house built about 1835 and a brick smokehouse.

It was added to the National Register of Historic Places in 1984.
