= Point Andalusia =

Location in the Southern Atlantic Ocean

The Point Andalusia (German: Planquadrat Andalusien) was a set, secret, location in the Southern Atlantic Ocean, used by warships of Nazi Germany's Kriegsmarine during the Second World War.

== History ==
German warships used the location to re-supply during operations in the Southern Atlantic Ocean against allied merchant ships. The location was at 15° S 18° W.

It was an important supply point used by a variety of German ships during the war.

== Ships using the supply point ==
- Admiral Scheer:
  - 26 December 1940: met raider Pinguin, Thor and supply ships Nordmark and Eurofeld
  - 24 to 28 January 1941: met Thor and Nordmark
  - 9 to 10 March 1941: met Pinguin, Kormoran and Nordmark
