= Al-Andalus Mosque =

Mosque in Málaga, Andalusia, Spain

- Spanish: Mezquita de al-Ándalus
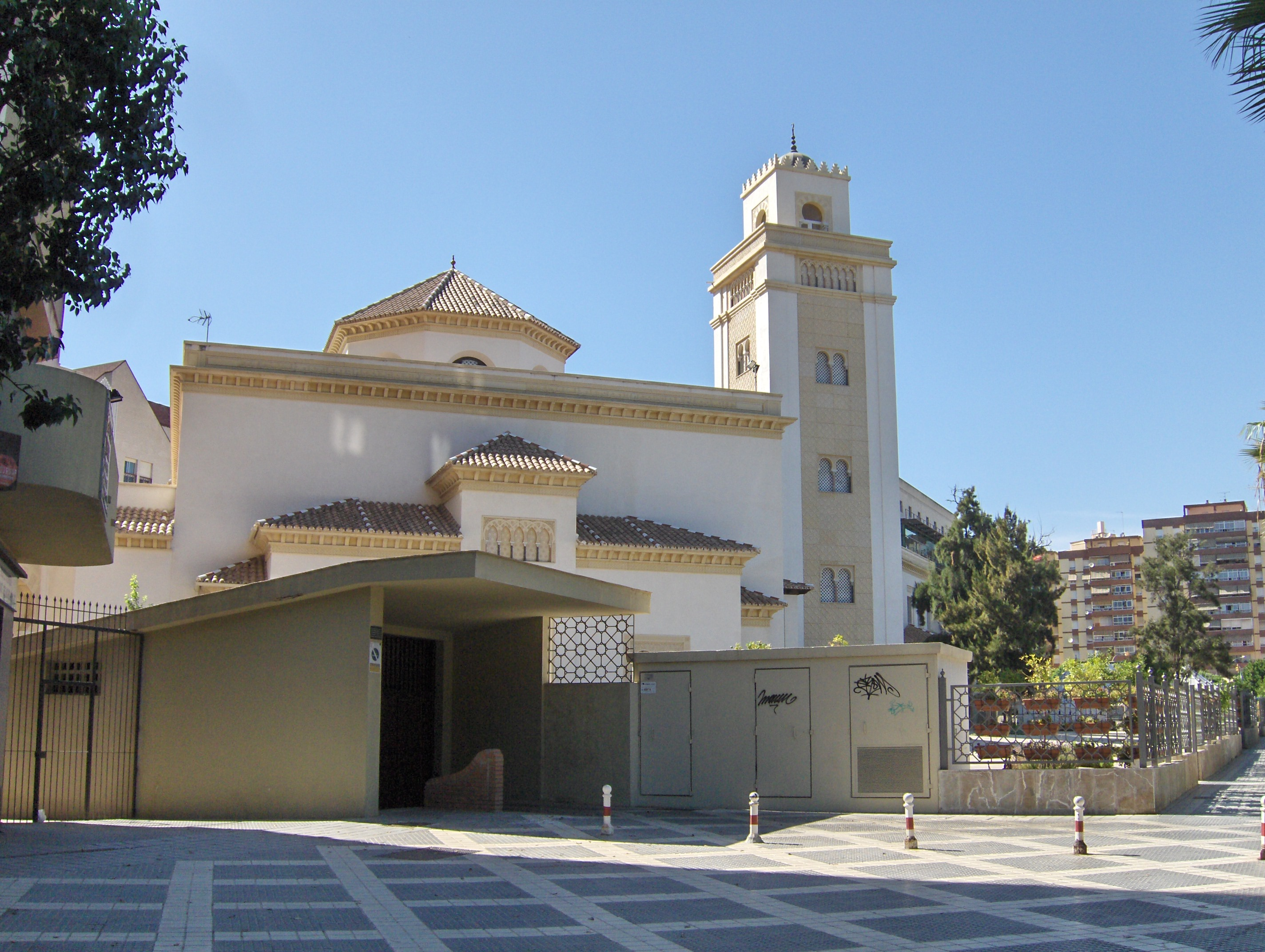

- Location of the mosque in Andalusia

Religion
- Affiliation: Sunni Islam
- Ecclesiastical or organizational status: Mosque
- Status: Active

Location
- Location: Málaga, Andalusia
- Country: Spain
- Interactive map of Al-Andalus Mosque
- Coordinates: 36°43′09″N 4°26′18″W

Architecture
- Type: Mosque architecture
- Style: Islamic; Moorish/Andalusi; Moorish Revival architecture

Specifications
- Capacity: 1,000 worshipers
- Interior area: 4,000 m^{2} (43,000 sq ft)
- Minaret: One
- Minaret height: 25 m (82 ft)

Al-Andalus Mosque (Spanish: Mezquita de al-Ándalus) is a Sunni Islam mosque in the neighbourhood of Arroyo del Cuarto city of Málaga, Andalusia, Spain.

== Structure ==
The mosque is 4,000 m^{2} (43,000 sq ft) in area and two entrances, one for men and one for women. It has a kindergarten, an auditorium for 200 people, three prayer rooms, classrooms, library or Arabic classes are taught among other services. It has a capacity for 1,000 people, making it one of the largest mosques in Europe.

The minaret of the mosque is 25 m (82 ft) high.

== Gallery ==
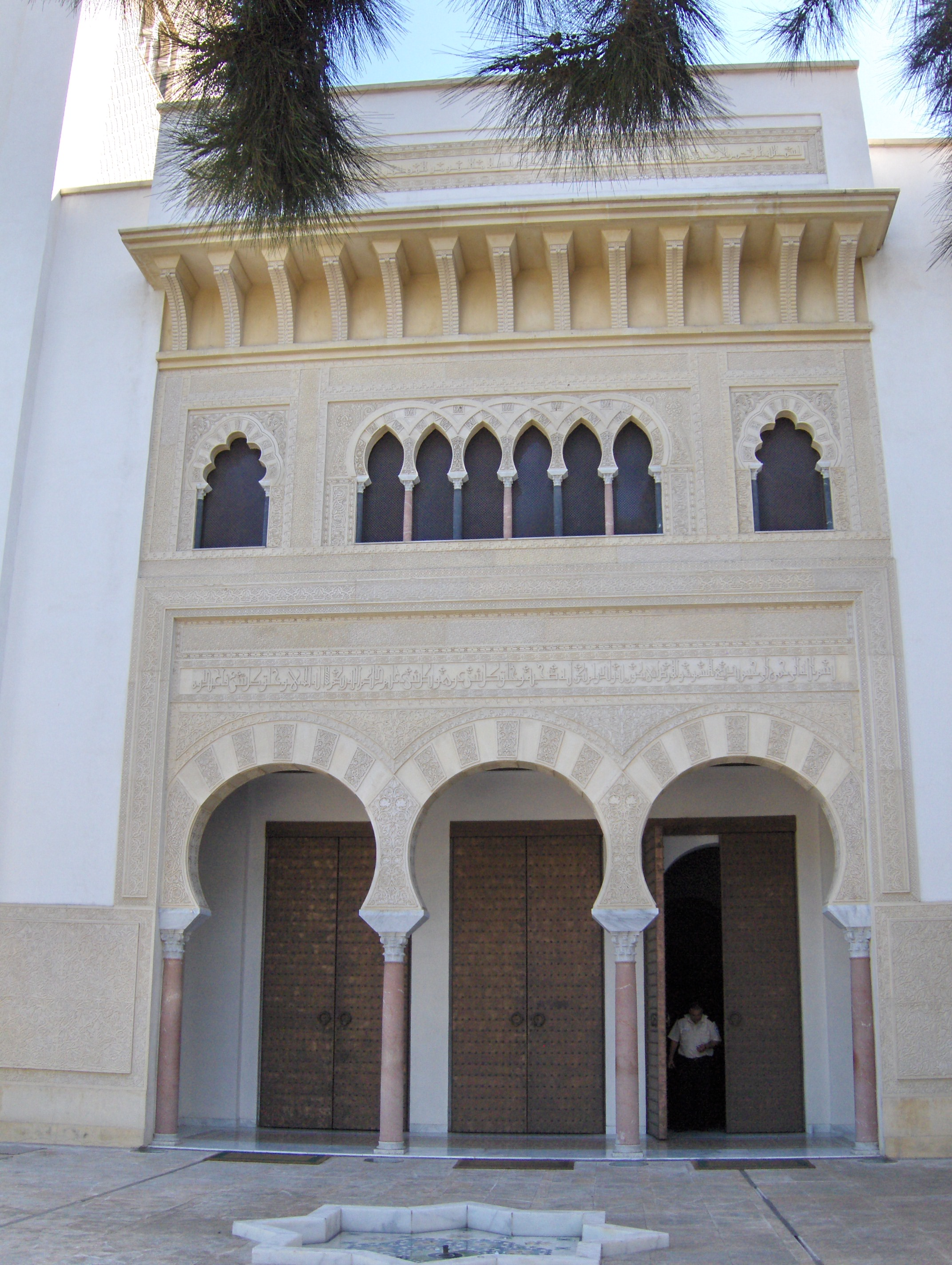
The mosque entrance

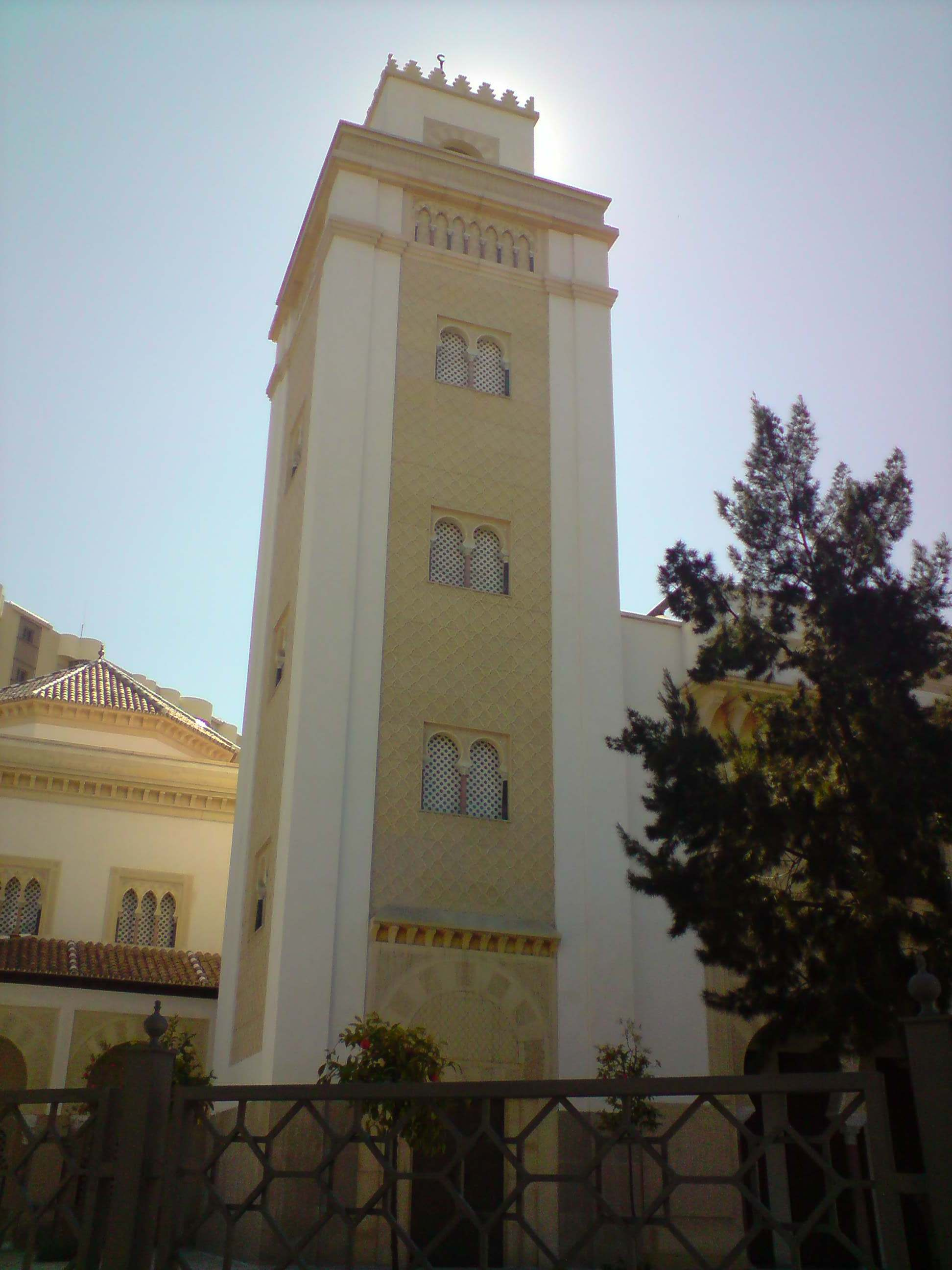
Mosque minaret

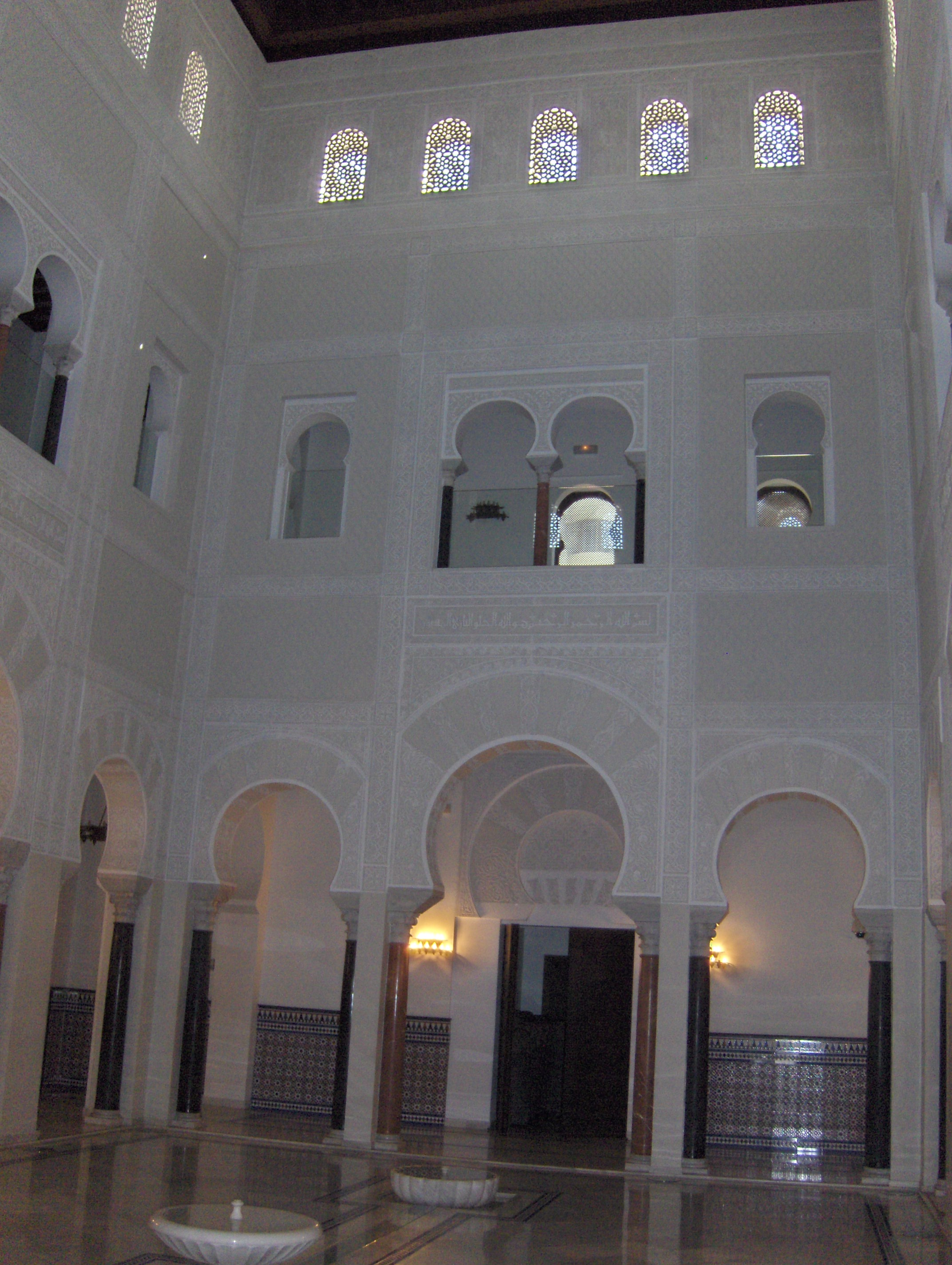
The mosque interior

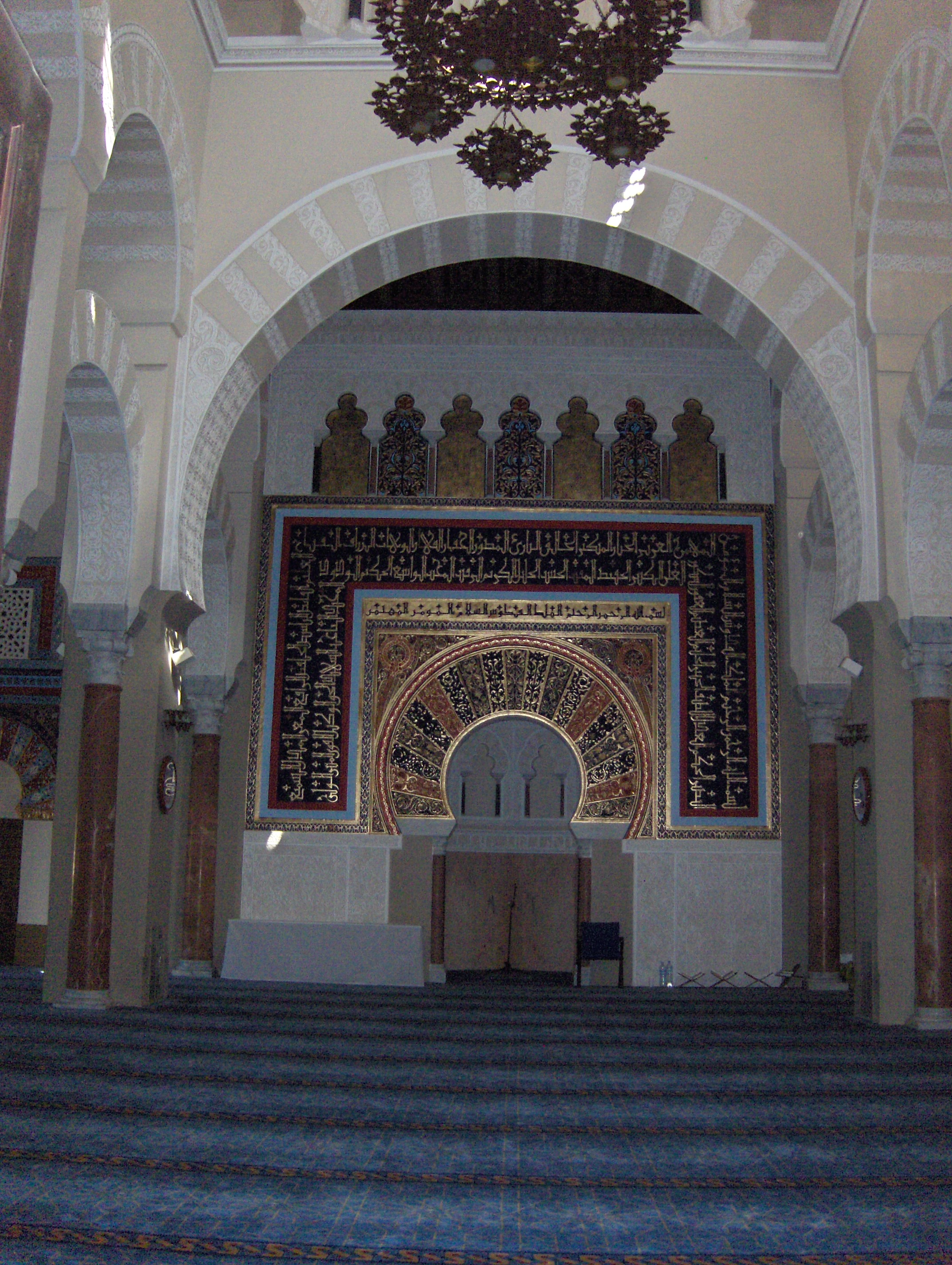
The Mihrab (Prayer niche) where the Imam stands and leads Islamic congregational prayers (Salah)

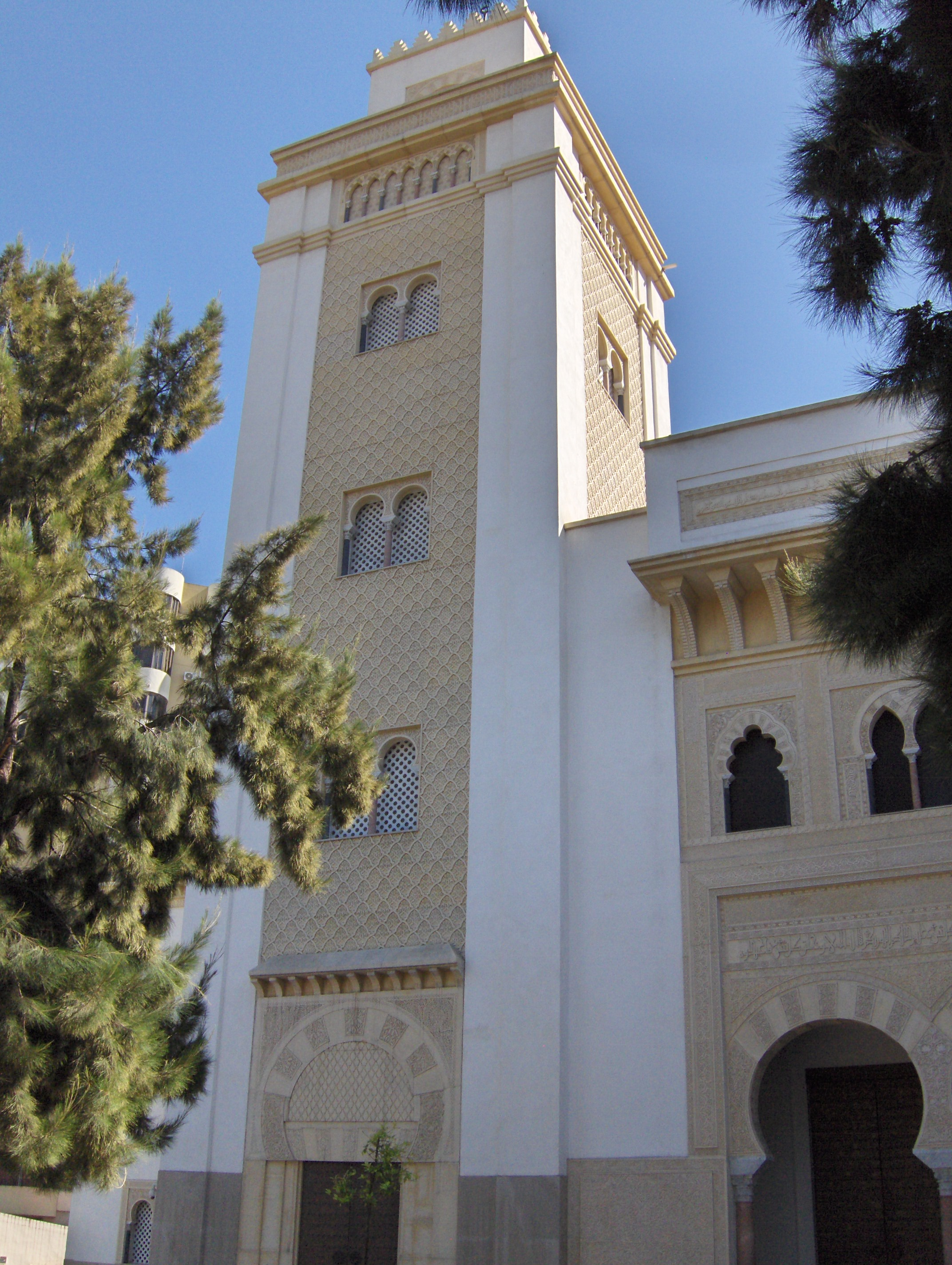
Another view of minaret and mosque
