= Andalus =

Andalus may refer to:

== Places ==
- Al-Andalus, a historical region in Europe around the Iberian Peninsula
- Andalusia, a modern-day Spanish autonomous community
- Al Andalus (Kuwait), a suburb of Kuwait City
- Al Andalus mall, a shopping mall in Jeddah, Saudi Arabia

== Other uses ==
- Al-Andalus Ensemble, an American world music group
- Al Andalus Tobruk, a Libyan football (soccer) club
- Andalus Airlines, a former Spanish airline
- Andalus, a typeface included with Microsoft Windows
- Andalus, a word variety of Andalas

== See also ==
- Andalusia (disambiguation)
