= Al-Fajr Media =

- الفجر وسائط
- Founder: Al-Qaeda
- Dates active: 2006–2016
- Dissolved: 2016
- Status: Defunct
- Part of: Al-Qaeda

Al-Fajr Media (Arabic: الفجر وسائط, romanized: al-Fajr wasāʼiṭ) or Dawn Media was an Al-Qaeda affiliated media organization that was started in 2006 and was used by multiple Al-Qaeda affiliated organizations on Jihadist forums.

== History ==
=== Early years ===
Al-Fajr Media started with memorials of dead members/leaders of Al-Qaeda and other Al-Qaeda affiliated groups and distributed the videos on Jihadist forums based in the Middle east and North Africa. The organization also posted videos with Ansar al-Islam that call for Jihad.

Al-Fajr also released an online magazine in 2006 entitled "Technical Mujahid" which focused on online security and technology.

Al-Fajr released posters in 2006 inciting for people to spread them.

Al-Fajr has also shown support for Palestinian Jihadist organizations and incited them to Jihad against Israel.

Al-Fajr also in 2007 starts working with Islamic State in Iraq to report on new control of towns and cities in Iraq, and they also start reporting on "enemy attack".

Al-Fajr also starts releasing books by Ayman al-Zawahiri to show support for Al-Qaeda and Ayman al-Zawahiri in early 2007.

In late 2008, Al-Fajr Media created a Jihadist forum which was taken down abruptly after release, Al-Fajr did make a statement about the forum's shutdown.

In December 2008, Al-Fajr recommended for Jihadist to "invade" the YouTube website and to spread Jihadist videos on there.

=== Mid-years ===
In 2010, Al-Fajr started a series called "Manufacturing Terrorism" for Jihadists online.

In May 2011, Al-Fajr announced, with the permission of Al-Qaeda, of Osama Bin Ladin's death, and incited for Jihadists to take "revenge" for Osama Bin Ladin's death.

In February 2012, Al-Fajr released a women's magazine for Jihadist women.

In September 2012, Al-Fajr releases a Technical Committee which revolves around app and website making for online Jihadists.

=== Late years ===
In late 2013, Al-Fajr releases a encryption application to encrypt messages when talking to Jihadists.

In Mid-2014, Al-Fajr releases an encryption application for Android phones for Jihadists on phone messaging services like Telegram.

In early 2016, Al-Fajr released a pasting website for Jihadists as an alternative for a pasting website like Pastebin.

== Designation as a Terrorist organization ==
In 2016, when Al-Fajr Media became defunct, the United States officially called Al-Fajr Media a media center of Al-Qaeda and designated it as a terrorist organization.
