= Equalization =

Equalization may refer to:

== Science and technology ==
- Bandwidth equalization, in computer networking
- Blind equalization, a digital signal processing technique
- Delay equalization
- Equalization (communications), specific to communications systems
- Equalization (audio), specific to audio signals and sound processing
- Equalizing basin, a reservoir used to regulate water flow below a dam
- Histogram equalization
- RIAA equalization, the RIAA specification for the correct playback of gramophone records

== Economics and finance ==
- Factor price equalization
- Equalization payments
- Equalization pool
- Property tax equalization
- Risk equalization
- Tax equalization of wages across countries
- Interest Equalization Tax

== Other ==
- Equalization of pressure within the ear, a.k.a. ear clearing
- Equalization of pressure in the Diving mask
- Equalization, sharing of load in anchors for rappelling and rock climbing

== See also ==
- Equalizer (disambiguation)
- Equal (disambiguation)
