= Inequality =

Inequality may refer to:

- Inequality (mathematics), a relation between two quantities when they are different.
- Economic inequality, difference in economic well-being between population groups
  - Income inequality, an unequal distribution of income
  - Wealth inequality, an unequal distribution of wealth
  - Spatial inequality, the unequal distribution of income and resources across geographical regions
  - International inequality, economic differences between countries
- Social inequality, unequal opportunities and rewards for different social positions or statuses within a group
  - Gender inequality, unequal treatment or perceptions due to gender
  - Racial inequality, social distinctions between racial and ethnic groups within a society
- Health inequality, differences in the quality of health and healthcare across populations
- Educational inequality, the unequal distribution of academic resources
- Environmental inequality, unequal environmental harms between different neighborhoods or cities
  - Urban forest inequity, an unequal distribution of trees
- Attention inequality, unequal distribution of attention across users, groups of people, issues in etc. in attention economy
- Participation inequality, the phenomenon in which a small percentage of people contributes the majority of information to the total outcome

== See also ==
- Equality (disambiguation)
- Equal (disambiguation)
- Inequation (≠)
- List of countries by wealth inequality
- List of countries by income inequality
- List of inequalities
