= List of countries by wealth inequality =

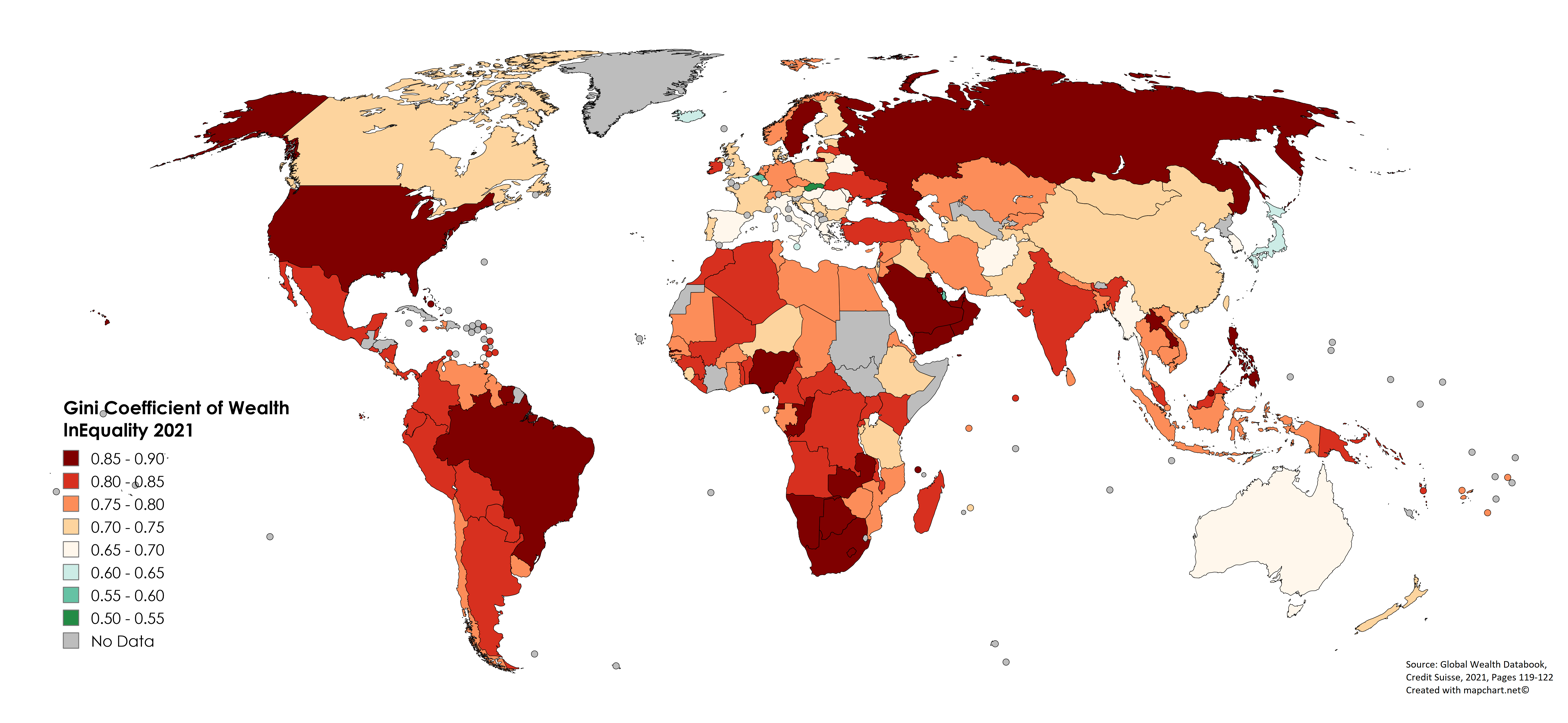
A map showing Gini coefficients for Wealth within countries for 2021.

Wealth share of the richest 1 percent. From Our World in Data. At the source there is more interactivity, and stats for the top 10% too. A higher wealth share correlates with a higher Gini number in the table below.

This is a list of countries by wealth inequality, including Gini coefficients. Wealth distribution can vary greatly from income distribution in a country (see List of countries by income inequality).

Higher Gini coefficients for wealth signify greater wealth inequality, with 0 being complete equality, whereas a value near 1 can arise if everybody has zero wealth except a very small minority.

Developed countries like the US with a high Gini coefficient can have high mean (average) wealth per adult, but a relatively low median wealth per adult compared to other developed nations. Median wealth is midpoint where 50% of adults have higher wealth, and 50% have lower wealth. See both measures of wealth here: List of countries by wealth per adult.

Countries that have high taxes on wealth and honest reporting from financial institutions, such as Norway, tend to have more reliable wealth inequality statistics.

== List ==
The wealth Gini coefficient is a statistical measure that quantifies how net worth (total assets minus liabilities) is distributed across a population. It ranges from 0 (perfect equality), where everyone owns the exact same amount of wealth, to 1 (perfect inequality), where a single person owns all the wealth. The table below is for 2008, 2018, 2019 and 2021. The GDP data is based on data from the World Bank as of 2022. The population data is based on data from the UN as of 2024. The Wealth Gini coefficients from 2008 are based on a working paper published by the National Bureau of Economic Research.

The Wealth Gini numbers for 2018, 2019, and 2021 come from the Global Wealth Databook by Credit Suisse.

* indicates "Wealth inequality in [country or territory]" or "Income inequality in [country or territory]" links.

Country	Wealth Gini				Population		Nominal GDP		GDP per capita
Country	2008	2018	2019	2021	Numbers	% of world	(in millions of US dollars)	% of world	GDP per capita
World	0.804	0.904	0.885	0.889	8,277,071,000	100	101,560,901	100	11,258
Afghanistan	—N/a	—N/a	0.655	0.689	—N/a	—N/a	—N/a	—N/a	—N/a
Albania	0.642	0.629	0.637	0.686	2,882,740	0.035	15,103	0.012	5,239
Algeria	0.67	0.758	0.749	0.848	42,228,420	0.51	0.55	0	4,115
Angola	—N/a	—N/a	0.731	0.814	—N/a	—N/a	—N/a	—N/a	—N/a
Antigua and Barbuda	0.747	0.838	0.823	0.813	96,280	0.0012	1,611	0.0013	16,732
Argentina *	0.74	0.792	0.768	0.809	44,361,150	0.54	0.58	0	11,719
Armenia	0.684	0.645	0.663	0.731	2,951,740	0.036	12,433	0.0097	4,212
Aruba	—N/a	—N/a	0.703	0.813	—N/a	—N/a	—N/a	—N/a	—N/a
Australia	0.622	0.658	0.656	0.662	24,898,150	0.30	1,433,904	1.1	57,591
Austria	0.646	0.764	0.739	0.742	8,891,380	0.11	455,286	0.36	51,205
Azerbaijan	0.678	0.643	0.654	0.726	9,949,540	0.12	46,940	0.037	4,718
Bahamas	—N/a	—N/a	0.828	0.895	—N/a	—N/a	—N/a	—N/a	—N/a
Bahrain	—N/a	—N/a	0.747	0.885	—N/a	—N/a	—N/a	—N/a	—N/a
Bangladesh	0.66	0.671	0.678	0.754	161,376,710	1.9	416,300	0.33	1,698
Barbados	0.706	0.788	0.778	0.805	285,720	0.0035	4,990	0.0039	17,465
Belarus	0.628	0.614	0.621	0.672	9,452,620	0.11	59,662	0.047	6,312
Belgium	0.662	0.659	0.603	0.599	11,482,180	0.14	542,761	0.42	47,270
Belize	0.763	0.815	0.803	0.835	383,070	0.0046	1,871	0.0015	4,884
Benin	0.713	0.689	0.707	0.800	11,485,040	0.14	10,354	0.0081	902
Bolivia	0.762	0.779	0.764	0.808	11,050,000	0.13	40,288	0.031	3,646
Bosnia and Herzegovina	—N/a	—N/a	0.642	0.692	3,301	00	21,023	0.016	6,056
Botswana	0.751	0.783	0.8	0.879	2,254.07	0	18,616	0.015	8,259
Brazil *	0.62	0.823	0.849	0.892	209,469,320	2.5	2.74	0	8,921
Brunei	—N/a	—N/a	0.787	0.897	—N/a	—N/a	—N/a	—N/a	—N/a
Bulgaria	0.652	0.647	0.659	0.702	7,051,610	0.085	65,133	0.051	9,237
Burkina Faso	0.728	0.674	0.688	0.790	19,751,470	0.24	14,125	0.011	715
Burundi	0.699	0.654	0.681	0.703	11,175,380	0.14	3,037	0.0024	272
Cambodia	0.714	0.704	0.718	0.783	16,249,800	0.20	24,542	0.019	1,510
Cameroon	0.711	0.725	0.743	0.833	25,216,260	0.30	38,675	0.030	1,534
Canada	0.688	0.726	0.728	0.726	37,074,560	0.45	1,713,342	1.3	46,213
Central African Republic	0.782	0.768	0.777	0.845	4,666,380	0.056	2,220	0.0017	476
Chad	0.681	0.715	0.73	0.776	15,477,730	0.19	0.2	0	728
Chile	0.777	0.773	0.798	0.794	18,729,170	0.23	331,250	0.26	15,923
China *	0.55	0.714	0.702	0.701	1,427,647,790	17	15,710,960	12	9,532
Colombia *	0.765	0.807	0.77	0.835	49,661,060	0.60	0.65	0	6,666
Comoros	0.711	0.766	0.783	0.861	832,320	0.010	1,178	0.00092	1,415
DR Congo	—N/a	—N/a	0.755	0.830	—N/a	—N/a	—N/a	—N/a	—N/a
Congo	—N/a	—N/a	0.769	0.855	—N/a	—N/a	—N/a	—N/a	—N/a
Costa Rica	0.732	0.769	0.75	0.797	4,999,440	0.060	0.07	0	12,027
Croatia	0.654	0.631	0.645	0.702	4,156,410	0.050	60,972	0.048	14,669
Cyprus	—N/a	—N/a	0.801	0.791	—N/a	—N/a	—N/a	—N/a	—N/a
Czech Republic	0.626	0.758	0.725	0.776	10,649,800	0.13	245,226	0.19	23,026
Denmark *	0.808	0.835	0.838	0.739	5,752,130	0.069	355,675	0.28	61,834
Djibouti	—N/a	—N/a	0.729	0.796	—N/a	—N/a	—N/a	—N/a	—N/a
Dominica	0.763	0.84	0.823	0.813	71,630	0.00087	0	0	7,693
Dominican Republic	0.723	—N/a	—N/a	—N/a	10,627.15	0.00013	85,555	0.067	8,051
Ecuador *	0.76	0.776	0.759	0.801	17,084,360	0.21	0.22	0	6,345
Egypt	0.689	0.909	0.756	0.793	99,581,200	1.2	250,895	0.20	2,520
El Salvador	0.746	0.759	0.743	0.812	6,420,740	0.078	26,057	0.020	4,058
Equatorial Guinea	0.688	0.781	0.793	0.864	1,308,970	0.016	13,432	0.010	10,262
Eritrea	—N/a	—N/a	0.621	0.763	—N/a	—N/a	—N/a	—N/a	—N/a
Estonia	0.675	0.715	0.716	0.731	1,322,910	0.016	30,732	0.024	23,231
Eswatini	0.78	—N/a	—N/a	—N/a	1,136.27	0	4,711	0.0037	4,146
Ethiopia	0.652	0.612	0.62	0.723	109,224,410	1.3	1.43	0	772
Fiji	0.709	0.694	0.702	0.785	883,490	0.011	5,537	0.0043	6,267
Finland	0.615	0.767	0.742	0.744	5,522,590	0.067	276,743	0.22	50,111
France *	0.73	0.687	0.696	0.702	64,990,510	0.79	3,135,267	2.4	42,738
Gabon	0.784	0.7	0.719	0.797	2,119.28	0	16,854	0.013	7,953
Gambia	0.723	0.755	0.771	0.857	2,051,360	0.025	1,633	0.0013	796
Georgia	0.725	0.678	0.687	0.817	4,002,950	0.048	17,600	0.014	4,397
Germany *	0.667	0.816	0.816	0.788	83,124,410	1.0	3,947,620	3.1	47,491
Ghana	0.692	0.682	0.699	0.753	29,767,110	0.36	65,556	0.051	2,202
Greece	0.654	0.682	0.654	0.682	10,522,240	0.13	218,032	0.17	20,721
Grenada	0.763	0.842	0.827	0.682	111,450	0.0013	1,186	0.00093	10,642
Guatemala *	0.779	—N/a	—N/a	—N/a	17,247.86	0.00021	78,460	0.061	4,549
Guinea	0.693	0.716	0.741	0.816	12,414,290	0.15	10,907	0.0085	879
Guinea-Bissau	0.71	0.697	0.712	0.780	1,874,300	0.023	0.02	0	778
Guyana	0.707	0.75	0.734	0.769	779,010	0.0094	0.01	7.8×10^{−9}	4,979
Haiti	0.755	0.82	0.801	0.799	11,123,180	0.13	0.15	0	868
Honduras *	0.743	0.804	—N/a	—N/a	9,587.52	0.00012	23,970	0.019	2,500
Hong Kong	0.740	—N/a	0.777	0.738	7,482.5	00	362,682	0.28	48,471
Hungary *	0.651	0.662	0.663	0.680	9,707,500	0.12	157,883	0.12	16,264
Iceland	0.664	0.731	0.694	0.649	336,710	0.0041	25,878	0.020	76,855
India *	0.669	0.854	0.832	0.823	1,352,642,280	16	2,718,732	2.1	2,010
Indonesia *	0.764	0.84	0.833	0.782	267,670,550	3.2	3.51	0	3,893
Iran	0.707	0.705	0.705	0.792	82,531,700	1.00	454,013	0.35	5,501
Iraq	—N/a	—N/a	0.633	0.710	—N/a	—N/a	—N/a	—N/a	—N/a
Ireland	0.581	0.83	0.796	0.800	4,818,690	0.058	511,458	0.40	102,394
Israel	0.677	0.766	0.777	0.747	8,381,510	0.10	370,588	0.29	44,215
Italy	0.609	0.689	0.669	0.672	60,627,290	0.73	2,083,864	1.6	34,372
Ivory Coast	0.712	—N/a	—N/a	—N/a	25,069.23	0.00030	43,007	0.034	1,716
Jamaica	0.686	0.788	0.775	0.822	2,934,850	0.035	15,714	0.012	5,354
Japan	0.547	0.631	0.626	0.647	127,202,190	1.5	4,971,323	3.9	39,082
Jordan	0.678	0.677	0.696	0.767	9,965,320	0.12	42,231	0.033	4,238
Kazakhstan	0.655	0.952	0.772	0.776	18,319,620	0.22	179,340	0.14	9,790
Kenya	0.699	0.732	0.745	0.826	51,392,570	0.62	87,908	0.069	1,711
Kuwait	—N/a	—N/a	0.763	0.862	—N/a	—N/a	—N/a	—N/a	—N/a
Kyrgyzstan	0.68	0.673	0.681	0.752	6,389,500	0.077	0.08	0	1,267
Laos	—N/a	—N/a	0.794	0.883	—N/a	—N/a	—N/a	—N/a	—N/a
Latvia	0.67	0.788	0.789	0.805	1,928,460	0.023	0.03	0	17,843
Lebanon *	0.762	0.889	0.819	0.802	6,859,410	0.083	56,639	0.044	8,257
Lesotho	0.767	0.795	0.805	0.888	2,108,330	0.025	2,739	0.0021	1,299
Liberia	—N/a	—N/a	0.727	0.806	—N/a	—N/a	—N/a	—N/a	—N/a
Libya	—N/a	—N/a	0.659	0.760	—N/a	—N/a	—N/a	—N/a	—N/a
Lithuania	0.666	0.655	0.663	0.720	2,801,270	0.034	53,429	0.042	19,073
Luxembourg	0.65	0.663	0.67	0.663	604,240	0.0073	0.01	7.8×10^{−9}	117,312
Macau	0.58	—N/a	—N/a	—N/a	667.4	0	55,084	0.043	82,535
Madagascar	0.722	0.702	0.722	0.821	26,262,310	0.32	13,853	0.011	527
Malawi	0.736	0.733	0.751	0.845	18,143,220	0.22	7,065	0.0055	389
Malaysia *	0.733	0.82	0.796	0.830	31,528,030	0.38	0.41	0	11,373
Maldives *	—N/a	—N/a	0.724	0.808	—N/a	—N/a	—N/a	—N/a	—N/a
Mali	0.75	0.682	0.707	0.800	19,077,760	0.23	0.25	00	900
Malta	0.664	0.631	0.64	0.611	439,260	0.0053	20,331	0.016	33,131
Mauritania	0.686	0.667	0.681	0.758	4,403,310	0.053	5,235	0.0041	1,189
Mauritius	0.661	0.64	0.662	0.716	1,267,180	0.015	0.02	0	11,222
Mexico *	0.749	0.8	0.777	0.804	126,190,780	1.5	1,220,699	0.95	9,673
Moldova	—N/a	—N/a	0.645	0.691	—N/a	—N/a	—N/a	—N/a	—N/a
Mongolia	—N/a	—N/a	0.668	0.742	—N/a	—N/a	—N/a	—N/a	—N/a
Montenegro	—N/a	—N/a	0.648	0.681	—N/a	—N/a	—N/a	—N/a	—N/a
Morocco	0.69	0.802	0.766	0.824	36,029,090	0.44	0.47	0	3,273
Mozambique	0.689	0.7	0.716	0.750	29,496	0.00036	14,717	0.011	499
Myanmar	—N/a	—N/a	0.597	0.680	—N/a	—N/a	—N/a	—N/a	—N/a
Namibia	0.847	0.776	0.788	0.868	2,448,300	0.030	14,522	0.011	5,931
Nepal	—N/a	—N/a	0.71	0.788	—N/a	—N/a	—N/a	—N/a	—N/a
Netherlands *	0.65	0.789	0.902	0.750	17,059,560	0.21	912,242	0.71	53,557
New Zealand *	0.651	0.708	0.672	0.700	4,743,130	0.057	204,924	0.16	43,204
Nicaragua	0.755	0.778	0.759	0.813	6,465,500	0.078	13,118	0.010	2,029
Niger	0.729	0.66	0.682	0.738	22,442,830	0.27	0.29	0	414
Nigeria	0.729	0.894	0.809	0.860	195,874,690	2.4	397,270	0.31	2,028
North Macedonia	0.661	0.655	—N/a	—N/a	2,082.96	0	12,672	0.0099	6,084
Norway	0.633	0.791	0.798	0.794	5,337,960	0.064	434,167	0.34	81,336
Oman	—N/a	—N/a	0.786	0.880	—N/a	—N/a	—N/a	—N/a	—N/a
Pakistan	0.698	0.65	0.665	0.740	212,228,290	2.6	2.78	0	1,482
Panama	0.766	0.795	0.78	0.819	4,176,870	0.050	0.05	0	15,575
Papua New Guinea	0.738	0.76	0.766	0.843	8,606,320	0.10	0.11	0	2,730
Paraguay	0.766	0.785	0.768	0.815	6,956,070	0.084	40,497	0.032	5,822
Peru	0.738	0.795	0.788	0.800	31,989,270	0.39	222,045	0.17	6,941
Philippines *	0.717	0.826	0.837	0.873	106,651,390	1.3	330,910	0.26	3,103
Poland *	0.657	0.722	0.677	0.716	37,921,590	0.46	585,664	0.46	15,444
Portugal	0.667	0.736	0.692	0.706	10,256,190	0.12	240,675	0.19	23,466
Puerto Rico	0.753	—N/a	—N/a	—N/a	3,039.6	0	101,131	0.079	33,271
Qatar	—N/a	—N/a	0.633	0.586	—N/a	—N/a	—N/a	—N/a	—N/a
Romania	0.651	0.728	0.647	0.696	19,506,110	0.24	239,553	0.19	12,281
Russia *	0.699	0.875	0.879	0.880	146,801,930	1.8	1,657,555	1.3	11,291
Rwanda	0.714	0.728	0.742	0.818	12,301,970	0.15	9,509	0.0074	773
Samoa	—N/a	—N/a	0.747	0.777	—N/a	—N/a	—N/a	—N/a	—N/a
São Tomé and Príncipe	—N/a	—N/a	0.674	0.734	—N/a	—N/a	—N/a	—N/a	—N/a
Saudi Arabia	0.737	0.81	0.834	0.864	33,702,760	0.41	0.44	0	23,337
Senegal	0.697	0.705	0.726	0.797	15,854,320	0.19	24,130	0.019	1,522
Serbia	—N/a	—N/a	0.676	0.713	6,963.76	0	55,437	0.043	7,992
Seychelles	0.76	0.679	0.704	0.760	97,090	0.0012	0	0	16,376
Sierra Leone	0.687	0.671	0.694	0.732	7,650,150	0.092	4,085	0.0032	534
Singapore *	0.689	0.758	0.757	0.788	5,757,500	0.070	364,157	0.28	63,249
Slovakia	0.629	0.498	0.498	0.505	5,453,020	0.066	105,905	0.083	19,421
Slovenia	0.626	0.646	0.662	0.652	2,077,840	0.025	54,008	0.042	25,992
Solomon Islands	—N/a	—N/a	0.7	0.814	—N/a	—N/a	—N/a	—N/a	—N/a
South Africa *	0.763	0.806	0.806	0.886	57,792,520	0.70	368,289	0.29	6,373
South Korea *	0.579	0.67	0.606	0.682	51,709,100	0.62	1,823,852	1.4	35,196
Spain	0.57	0.697	0.694	0.691	46,692,860	0.56	0.61	0	30,391
Sri Lanka	0.665	0.687	0.7	0.770	21,228.76	0.00026	88,901	0.069	4,188
Saint Lucia	—N/a	—N/a	0.728	0.813	—N/a	—N/a	—N/a	—N/a	—N/a
Saint Vincent and the Grenadines	—N/a	—N/a	0.818	0.813	—N/a	—N/a	—N/a	—N/a	—N/a
Sudan	—N/a	—N/a	0.687	—N/a	—N/a	—N/a	—N/a	—N/a	—N/a
Suriname	—N/a	—N/a	0.832	0.886	—N/a	—N/a	—N/a	—N/a	—N/a
Sweden *	0.742	0.865	0.867	0.881	9,971,630	0.12	556,086	0.43	55,767
Switzerland	0.803	0.741	0.705	0.772	8,570,150	0.10	705,140	0.55	82,279
Syria	—N/a	—N/a	0.699	0.778	—N/a	—N/a	—N/a	—N/a	—N/a
Taiwan	—N/a	—N/a	0.751	0.707	—N/a	—N/a	—N/a	—N/a	—N/a
Tajikistan	—N/a	—N/a	0.656	0.728	—N/a	—N/a	—N/a	—N/a	—N/a
Tanzania	0.676	0.65	0.661	0.744	56,313,440	0.68	0.74	0	1,030
Thailand *	0.71	0.902	0.846	0.771	69,428,450	0.84	0.91	0	7,274
Timor-Leste	—N/a	—N/a	0.565	0.627	—N/a	—N/a	—N/a	—N/a	—N/a
Togo	0.711	0.719	0.734	0.815	7,889,100	0.095	5,359	0.0042	679
Tonga	—N/a	—N/a	0.682	0.777	—N/a	—N/a	—N/a	—N/a	—N/a
Trinidad and Tobago	0.689	0.748	0.732	0.757	1,389,840	0.017	23,808	0.019	17,130
Tunisia	0.693	0.683	0.705	0.780	11,565,200	0.14	39,871	0.031	3,447
Turkey	0.718	0.871	0.794	0.810	82,340,090	0.99	771,350	0.60	9,368
Turkmenistan	—N/a	—N/a	0.63	0.705	—N/a	—N/a	—N/a	—N/a	—N/a
Uganda	0.723	0.714	0.729	0.828	42,729,030	0.52	27,461	0.021	643
Ukraine	0.667	0.955	0.847	0.834	44,246,160	0.53	130,832	0.10	2,957
United Arab Emirates	—N/a	—N/a	0.796	0.885	—N/a	—N/a	—N/a	—N/a	—N/a
United Kingdom *	0.697	0.747	0.746	0.706	67,141,680	0.81	2,855,297	2.2	42,526
United States *	0.801	0.852	0.852	0.850	327,096,260	4.0	20,544,343	16	62,808
Uruguay	0.708	0.741	0.721	0.774	3,449,290	0.042	59,597	0.047	17,278
Vanuatu	—N/a	—N/a	0.688	0.814	—N/a	—N/a	—N/a	—N/a	—N/a
Venezuela	—N/a	—N/a	0.743	0.778	—N/a	—N/a	—N/a	—N/a	—N/a
Vietnam	0.682	0.708	0.761	0.797	95,545,960	1.2	245,214	0.19	2,566
Yemen	0.613	0.801	0.798	0.883	28,498,680	0.34	26,914	0.021	944
Zambia	0.766	0.787	0.798	0.886	17,351,710	0.21	26,720	0.021	1,540
Zimbabwe	0.845	0.707	0.719	0.797	14,438,810	0.17	31,001	0.024	2,147

== See also ==
- Income inequality metrics
- List of countries by external debt
- List of countries by income inequality
- List of countries by GDP (nominal)
- List of countries by GDP (nominal) per capita
- List of countries by GDP (PPP)
- List of countries by GDP (PPP) per capita
- List of countries by Human Development Index
- List of countries by public debt
- List of countries by wealth per adult
- Wealth distribution by country
- Wealth inequality in the United States
