= Samata =

Samata may refer to:

== People with the given name ==
- Samata Das, Bengali actor
- Samata Sakuma, general in the Imperial Japanese Army, and the 5th Governor-General of Taiwan
- Samatam Kistaya, poet, historian and ayurvedic doctor

== Places ==
- Samata Nagar, a suburb of Mumbai, India
- Samata-i-Tai, a village on Savai'i in Samoa
- Samata-i-Uta, a village on Savai'i in Samoa
- Samatan, a commune in Gers, France
- Samatata, a kingdom in ancient Bengal
- Samatau, a village on the island of Upolu in Samoa

== Other uses ==
- Samata Party (disambiguation)
- Samata (NGO), an India-based non-governmental organization
- Samata Express, a superfast train near New Delhi, India

== See also ==
- Samatali (disambiguation)
- Samatar v. Yousuf, a case decided by the Supreme Court of the United States
- Samta (disambiguation)
