= Wealth distribution by country =

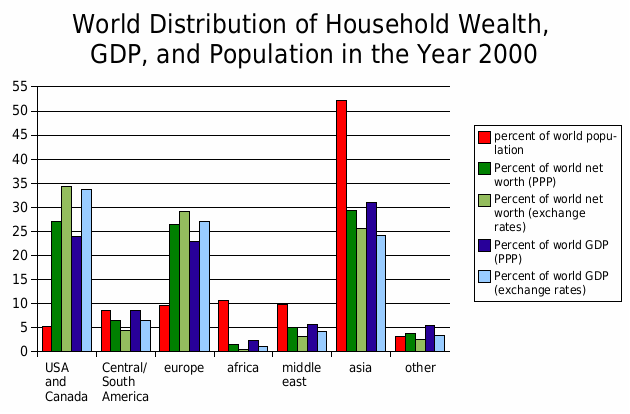
World distribution of wealth, GDP, and population by region in the year 2000

World distribution of wealth is the distribution of how wealth is distributed around the world. The guideline for categorizing the data is to organize it based on the continent on which the people with wealth reside. Sometimes, the data is organized by household wealth. It is useful to do it this way because sometimes the holders of wealth take care of other people who have no wealth, such as children or other family members.

== World distribution of wealth (2016) ==
Data for the following tables is obtained from The UN-WIDER World Distribution of Household Wealth Report.

=== By Region ===
Population, net worth and gross domestic product by region
Region	Population (%)		Net worth (%)		Gross domestic product (%)	
Region	World	Adult	PPP	Exchange rates	PPP	Exchange rates
America	13.69	59.22	33.61	38.73	32.37	40.11
Europe	9.62	74.32	27.69	31.09	22.86	27.51
Africa	11.73	46.26	1.97	0.71	3.03	1.40
Middle East	8.91	52.88	5.50	4.01	5.94	4.93
Asia	52.18	57.36	29.40	25.61	31.07	24.10
Other	2.78	71.75	2.82	1.51	4.48	2.16
Total	98.91	60.30	100.99	101.66	99.75	100.21

=== America ===
Country	% of population		Net worth				Gross domestic product			
Country	% of population		Per capita		% of world		Per capita		% of world	
Country	World	Adult	PPP	Exchange rates	PPP	Exchange rates	PPP	Exchange rates	PPP	Exchange rates
United States	4.67	71.39	143,727	143,727	25.40	32.65	35,619	35,619	21.97	31.49
Canada	0.50	74.18	89,252	70,916	1.70	1.74	28,731	22,828	1.91	2.18
Argentina	0.61	63.17	38,481	25,410	0.88	0.75	11,729	7,745	0.94	0.89
Bahamas	0.00	60.87	76,364	53,813	0.01	0.01	16,793	14,217	0.01	0.01
Barbados	0.00	71.27	103,787	58,121	0.02	0.01	17,526	9,815	0.01	0.01
Belize	0.00	49.27	12,318	5,851	0.00	0.00	7,170	3,406	0.00	0.00
Bermuda	0.00	71.66	138,417	136,630	0.01	0.01	—	42,533	—	0.01
Bolivia	0.14	50.15	7,215	2,450	0.04	0.02	2,934	996	0.05	0.03
Brazil	2.86	59.94	21,092	9,566	2.28	1.33	7,745	3,512	2.92	1.90
Chile	0.25	63.65	30,760	13,722	0.29	0.17	10,389	4,635	0.35	0.22
Colombia	0.69	57.45	14,291	4,730	0.37	0.16	5,796	1,918	0.53	0.25
Costa Rica	0.06	58.13	14,973	10,615	0.04	0.03	5,873	4,164	0.05	0.05
Cuba	0.18	72.09	12,086	4,587	0.08	0.04	—	2,467	—	0.09
Dominican Republic	0.14	53.99	13,729	5,713	0.07	0.04	5,654	2,352	0.10	0.06
Ecuador	0.20	55.01	6,911	1,996	0.05	0.02	3,720	1,074	0.10	0.04
El Salvador	0.10	53.95	18,893	8,632	0.07	0.04	4,622	2,112	0.06	0.04
Guadeloupe	0.01	67.10	76,364	53,813	0.02	0.02	—	10,030	—	0.01
Guatemala	0.18	44.65	12,769	4,934	0.09	0.04	4,335	1,675	0.11	0.06
Haiti	0.13	47.17	6,221	1,611	0.03	0.01	1,798	466	0.03	0.01
Honduras	0.11	47.09	5,523	2,356	0.02	0.01	2,164	923	0.03	0.02
Jamaica	0.04	57.20	10,416	8,562	0.02	0.02	3,464	2,848	0.02	0.02
Mexico	1.64	56.08	21,493	13,070	1.34	1.05	9,711	5,905	2.11	1.84
Nicaragua	0.08	45.96	5,138	1,248	0.02	0.00	1,947	473	0.02	0.01
Panama	0.05	58.67	15,677	8,152	0.03	0.02	6,650	3,458	0.04	0.03
Paraguay	0.09	49.41	11,101	3,163	0.04	0.01	4,801	1,368	0.06	0.02
Peru	0.43	55.29	12,234	5,328	0.20	0.11	4,799	2,090	0.27	0.17
Puerto Rico	0.06	68.03	75,582	54,362	0.18	0.17	22,242	15,998	0.19	0.19
Trinidad and Tobago	0.02	63.60	53,429	23,408	0.04	0.02	13,721	6,011	0.04	0.02
Uruguay	0.05	67.6	20,207	11,807	0.04	0.03	10,285	6,009	0.07	0.06
U.S. Virgin Islands	0.00	65.59	76,364	53,813	0.01	0.00	—	—	—	—
Venezuela	0.40	56.14	14,629	10,101	0.22	0.20	7,232	4,994	0.38	0.38
Total	13.69	59.22	Total net worth:		33.61	38.73	Total GDP:		32.37	40.11

=== Europe ===
Country	% of population		Net worth				Gross domestic product			
Country	% of population		Per capita		% of world		Per capita		% of world	
Country	World	Adult	PPP	Exchange rates	PPP	Exchange rates	PPP	Exchange rates	PPP	Exchange rates
Albania	0.05	60.44	10,504	3,155	0.02	0.01	3,658	1,099	0.02	0.01
Austria	0.13	77.46	66,639	62,420	0.34	0.40	24,836	23,264	0.44	0.59
Belarus	0.16	73.14	14,591	1,698	0.09	0.01	8,738	1,017	0.19	0.03
Belgium	0.17	76.63	85,818	76,577	0.55	0.63	25,008	22,315	0.56	0.72
Bosnia and Herzegovina	0.06	73.92	12,131	2,457	0.03	0.01	5,252	1,117	0.04	0.01
Bulgaria	0.13	77.43	15,356	3,544	0.08	0.02	6,356	1,467	0.11	0.04
Croatia	0.07	76.12	22,439	10,221	0.06	0.04	9,547	4,349	0.09	0.06
Czech Republic	0.17	76.84	32,431	10,797	0.21	0.09	14,844	4,942	0.33	0.16
Denmark	0.09	76.26	66,191	70,751	0.22	0.30	28,539	30,505	0.33	0.51
Estonia	0.02	74.36	26,361	8,420	0.02	0.01	10,873	3,473	0.03	0.01
Finland	0.09	75.44	38,754	37,171	0.12	0.15	24,416	23,419	0.27	0.38
France	0.97	74.83	130,546	128,327	4.73	5.97	24,478	24,679	3.10	4.40
Georgia	0.08	70.47	12,315	1,371	0.04	0.01	5,315	592	0.05	0.01
Germany	1.35	78.71	89,871	86,369	4.60	5.69	23,917	22,758	4.28	5.83
Gibraltar	0.00	77.2	99,526	90,277	0.00	0.00	—	—	—	—
Greece	0.18	78.07	72,825	50,240	0.50	0.44	15,558	10,733	0.37	0.37
Greenland	0.00	71.66	138,417	136,630	0.00	0.01	—	—	—	—
Hungary	0.17	76.61	32,456	13,562	0.21	0.11	11,063	4,623	0.25	0.15
Iceland	0.00	69.12	73,401	83,031	0.01	0.02	26,929	30,461	0.02	0.03
Ireland	0.06	69.59	89,327	82,555	0.21	0.25	27,197	25,135	0.22	0.30
Italy	0.95	80.42	119,704	98,317	4.30	4.54	22,876	18,604	2.87	3.34
Latvia	0.04	74.57	19,162	6,951	0.03	0.01	8,305	3,013	0.04	0.02
Liechtenstein	0.00	77.2	99,526	90,277	0.00	0.00	—	—	—	—
Lithuania	0.06	72.8	22,126	8,076	0.05	0.02	8,397	3,065	0.06	0.03
Luxembourg	0.01	75.42	182,567	160,030	0.05	0.06	48,968	42,923	0.05	0.06
North Macedonia	0.03	69.59	14,606	4,652	0.02	0.01	5,506	1,754	0.02	0.01
Malta	0.01	72.46	75,694	40,471	0.02	0.01	18,526	9,761	0.02	0.01
Moldova	0.07	67.7	8,498	1,155	0.02	0.00	2,212	301	0.02	0.00
Monaco	0.00	77.2	99,526	90,277	0.00	0.00	—	22,065	—	0.00
Netherlands	0.26	75.77	120,086	109,418	1.19	1.39	25,759	23,261	0.89	1.15
Netherlands Antilles	0.00	67.98	76,364	53,813	0.01	0.01	—	12,862	—	0.01
Norway	0.07	74.12	72,254	81,188	0.20	0.29	32,057	36,021	0.31	0.50
Poland	0.64	72.08	24,654	10,438	0.59	0.32	9,661	4,090	0.81	0.49
Portugal	0.17	77.05	53,357	33,421	0.34	0.27	17,089	10,614	0.38	0.34
Romania	0.36	74.29	14,827	4,821	0.20	0.09	5,024	1,634	0.24	0.11
Saint-Pierre and Miquelon	0.00	71.67	138,417	136,630	0.00	0.00	—	—	—	—
Serbia and Montenegro	0.17	72.3	12,131	2,457	0.08	0.02	—	1,043	—	0.03
Slovakia	0.09	72.22	23,968	6,779	0.08	0.03	12,619	3,569	0.15	0.06
Slovenia	0.03	77.35	36,672	19,713	0.04	0.03	16,983	9,130	0.07	0.06
Spain	0.67	79.00	92,253	68,693	2.34	2.24	19,037	14,048	1.68	1.78
Sweden	0.15	75.87	80,091	83,918	0.44	0.60	24,628	25,805	0.47	0.71
Switzerland	0.12	76.69	144,186	170,755	0.64	0.98	28,209	33,407	0.44	0.74
United Kingdom	0.96	74.78	128,959	126,832	4.71	5.95	24,252	23,852	3.09	4.35
Ukraine	0.81	74.46	9,890	1,236	0.30	0.05	5,147	643	0.55	0.10
Vatican City	0.00	77.20	99,526	90,277	0.00	0.00	—	—	—	—
Total	9.62	74.32	Total net worth:		27.69	31.09	Total GDP:		22.86	27.51

=== Africa ===
Country	% of population		Net worth				Gross domestic product			
Country	% of population		Per capita		% of world		Per capita		% of world	
Country	World	Adult	PPP	Exchange rates	PPP	Exchange rates	PPP	Exchange rates	PPP	Exchange rates
Algeria	0.50	53.68	7,270	2,087	0.14	0.05	6,107	1,754	0.40	0.17
Benin	0.12	43.24	3,370	950	0.02	0.01	1,225	345	0.02	0.01
Burkina Faso	0.19	40.66	2,123	419	0.01	0.00	986	195	0.02	0.01
Burundi	0.11	40.20	1,876	327	0.01	0.00	619	108	0.01	0.00
Cameroon	0.24	45.90	5,272	1,262	0.05	0.01	2,301	551	0.07	0.03
Chad	0.13	42.61	1,728	329	0.01	0.00	959	183	0.02	0.00
DR Congo	0.82	42.06	1,402	180	0.04	0.01	669	86	0.07	0.01
Congo	0.06	42.69	2,795	1,127	0.01	0.00	2,533	1,022	0.02	0.01
Côte d'Ivoire	0.27	44.99	5,502	1,589	0.06	0.02	2,028	586	0.07	0.03
Eritrea	0.06	43.66	2,349	577	0.01	0.00	747	203	0.01	0.00
Ethiopia	1.13	43.81	1,414	193	0.06	0.01	720	98	0.11	0.02
Eswatini	0.02	43.42	13,239	3,377	0.01	0.00	5,047	1,287	0.01	0.00
Ghana	0.33	47.41	4,129	775	0.05	0.01	1,376	258	0.06	0.02
Guinea	0.14	45.96	7,734	1,062	0.04	0.01	2,961	407	0.05	0.01
Guinea-Bissau	0.02	43.09	1,673	409	0.00	0.00	738	180	0.00	0.00
Kenya	0.50	43.69	3,671	966	0.07	0.02	1,316	346	0.09	0.03
Libya	0.09	53.97	17,339	6,285	0.06	0.03	—	6,484	—	0.11
Madagascar	0.27	44.83	2,223	633	0.02	0.01	877	249	0.03	0.01
Malawi	0.19	43.17	2,683	546	0.02	0.01	808	165	0.02	0.01
Mali	0.19	40.28	1,798	383	0.01	0.00	996	212	0.03	0.01
Mauritania	0.04	46.31	5,207	1,231	0.01	0.00	1,729	409	0.01	0.00
Mauritius	0.02	65.70	62,338	15,983	0.05	0.02	14,406	3,693	0.04	0.01
Morocco	0.48	55.31	13,603	3,687	0.25	0.09	4,299	1,165	0.27	0.11
Mozambique	0.29	45.16	2,817	545	0.03	0.01	1,113	215	0.04	0.01
Niger	0.19	40.39	1,756	329	0.01	0.00	902	169	0.02	0.01
Nigeria	1.93	43.73	960	377	0.07	0.04	826	325	0.21	0.12
Rwanda	0.13	40.50	2,951	638	0.01	0.00	976	211	0.02	0.01
Reunion	0.01	62.67	17,339	6,285	0.01	0.00	—	9,014	—	0.02
Senegal	0.17	43.96	4,294	1,172	0.03	0.01	1,681	459	0.04	0.01
Sierra Leone	0.07	47.38	2,044	353	0.01	0.00	734	127	0.01	0.00
Somalia	0.12	45.76	2,349	577	0.01	0.00	—	235	—	0.01
South Africa	0.75	55.86	16,266	5,977	0.46	0.22	8,017	2,946	0.79	0.42
Sudan	0.54	48.64	2,349	577	0.05	0.02	1,756	367	0.13	0.04
Tanzania	0.57	44.79	1,246	681	0.03	0.02	490	268	0.04	0.03
Togo	0.09	44.35	2,214	645	0.01	0.00	926	270	0.01	0.00
Tunisia	0.16	58.95	21,237	6,042	0.13	0.05	7,130	2,029	0.15	0.06
Uganda	0.40	38.55	2,905	725	0.04	0.01	1,030	257	0.05	0.02
Zambia	0.18	42.20	2,121	789	0.01	0.01	841	313	0.02	0.01
Zimbabwe	0.21	44.71	6,863	1,465	0.05	0.01	2,607	556	0.07	0.02
Total	11.73	46.26	Total net worth:		1.97	0.71	Total GDP:		3.03	1.40

=== Middle East ===
Country	% of population		Net worth				Gross domestic product			
Country	% of population		Per capita		% of world		Per capita		% of world	
Country	World	Adult	PPP	Exchange rates	PPP	Exchange rates	PPP	Exchange rates	PPP	Exchange rates
Afghanistan	0.39	42.90	6,561	1,164	0.10	0.02	—	101	—	0.01
Armenia	0.05	64.44	9,545	1,548	0.02	0.00	3,068	498	0.02	0.00
Azerbaijan	0.13	59.14	6,717	1,237	0.03	0.01	3,555	654	0.06	0.02
Bahrain	0.01	63.93	105,287	130,833	0.04	0.07	15,870	11,775	0.02	0.02
Egypt	1.11	52.83	16,650	5,754	0.70	0.31	4,406	1,523	0.64	0.32
Iran	1.09	51.31	17,569	11,621	0.73	0.62	7,202	4,764	1.04	0.98
Iraq	0.41	46.70	12,343	3,480	0.19	0.07	—	766	—	0.06
Israel	0.1	17.29	64,034	59,207	0.88	1.05	19,148	17,705	0.92	1.22
Jordan	0.08	49.76	12,217	4,825	0.04	0.02	4,282	1,691	0.05	0.03
Kazakhstan	0.25	63.24	14,281	2,119	0.13	0.03	8,331	1,236	0.27	0.06
Kuwait	0.04	66.88	105,287	130,833	0.15	0.23	15,743	15,947	0.08	0.11
Kyrgyzstan	0.08	54.64	5,174	433	0.02	0.00	3,205	268	0.03	0.00
Lebanon	0.06	59.56	20,526	12,828	0.04	0.03	6,089	3,806	0.04	0.04
Oman	0.04	53.26	18,943	11,130	0.03	0.02	12,491	7,615	0.07	0.06
Pakistan	2.34	47.65	6,296	1,255	0.56	0.14	2,158	430	0.67	0.19
Palestine	0.05	43.37	12,343	3,480	0.02	0.01	—	—	—	—
Qatar	0.01	67.09	105,287	130,833	0.04	0.06	—	30,558	—	0.06
Saudi Arabia	0.35	51.16	22,864	16,206	0.31	0.28	12,374	8,771	0.58	0.59
Syria	0.28	47.11	8,789	10,046	0.09	0.14	4,338	4,958	0.16	0.26
Tajikistan	0.10	46.54	2,942	298	0.01	0.00	1,380	140	0.02	0.00
Turkey	1.12	59.20	23,798	9,601	1.01	0.52	7,414	2,991	1.10	0.63
Turkmenistan	0.07	53.14	12,343	3,480	0.03	0.01	3,668	1,062	0.04	0.01
United Arab Emirates	0.05	68.76	105,287	130,833	0.21	0.34	—	18,906	—	0.19
Uzbekistan	0.41	51.83	6,561	1,164	0.10	0.02	1,516	552	0.08	0.04
Yemen	0.29	40.19	1,425	537	0.02	0.01	1,293	487	0.05	0.03
Total	8.91	52.88	Total net worth:		5.50	4.01	Total GDP:		5.94	4.93

=== Asia ===
Country	% of population		Net worth				Gross domestic product			
Country	% of population		Per capita		% of world		Per capita		% of world	
Country	World	Adult	PPP	Exchange rates	PPP	Exchange rates	PPP	Exchange rates	PPP	Exchange rates
Bangladesh	2.12	51.57	6,389	1,250	0.51	0.13	1,772	347	0.50	0.14
Brunei	0.01	60.06	105,287	130,833	0.02	0.03	—	12,922	—	0.01
Cambodia	0.21	45.88	4,883	753	0.04	0.01	1,859	287	0.05	0.01
China	20.57	67.27	11,267	2,613	8.77	2.62	3,844	891	10.45	3.47
East Timor	0.01	42.02	6,561	1,164	0.00	0.00	—	457	—	0.00
Hong Kong	0.11	76.61	202,189	173,353	0.83	0.92	27,893	23,915	0.40	0.49
India	16.78	55.88	6,513	1,112	4.14	0.91	2,684	458	5.95	1.45
Indonesia	3.44	59.49	7,973	1,440	1.04	0.24	4,035	729	1.83	0.47
Japan	2.09	79.45	124,858	180,837	9.86	18.37	25,924	37,547	7.15	14.84
Kiribati	0.00	52.86	10,084	4,153	0.00	0.00	—	574	—	0.00
Laos	0.09	46.75	6,561	1,164	0.02	0.00	1,551	328	0.02	0.01
Macao	0.10	5.09	73,072	44,794	0.28	0.22	23,118	14,172	0.31	0.27
Malaysia	0.38	56.28	15,046	6,137	0.22	0.11	9,422	3,843	0.47	0.27
Myanmar	0.78	57.18	6,561	1,164	0.19	0.04	—	877	—	0.13
Nepal	0.40	48.53	6,561	1,164	0.10	0.02	1,321	227	0.07	0.02
Niue	0.00	52.85	10,084	4,153	0.00	0.00	—	—	—	—
North Korea	0.36	65.41	6,561	1,164	0.09	0.02	—	476	—	0.03
Philippines	1.25	51.75	14,182	3,533	0.67	0.21	4,065	1,013	0.67	0.24
Singapore	0.07	71.94	113,631	90,960	0.28	0.29	28,644	22,929	0.25	0.29
South Korea	0.77	71.06	45,849	29,687	1.33	1.11	14,937	9,671	1.52	1.41
Sri Lanka	0.33	63.93	10,617	2,329	0.13	0.04	3,841	842	0.17	0.05
Taiwan	0.01	73.46	100,009	73,654	0.03	0.03	19,714	14,519	0.02	0.02
Thailand	1.01	65.37	14,824	4,390	0.57	0.22	6,715	1,989	0.90	0.38
Vietnam	1.29	55.96	5,633	1,112	0.28	0.07	2,012	397	0.34	0.10
Total	52.18	57.36	Total net worth:		29.40	25.61	Total GDP:		31.07	24.10

=== Other ===
Country	% of population		Net worth				Gross domestic product			
Country	% of population		Per capita		% of world		Per capita		% of world	
Country	World	Adult	PPP	Exchange rates	PPP	Exchange rates	PPP	Exchange rates	PPP	Exchange rates
Australia	0.31	71.78	90,906	67,990	1.08	1.04	27,193	20,338	1.13	1.21
New Zealand	0.06	70.14	55,823	37,026	0.13	0.11	20,008	13,271	0.17	0.16
Russia	2.41	73.34	17,610	3,036	1.61	0.36	9,996	1,723	3.18	0.79
Total	2.78	71.75	Total net worth:		2.82	1.51	Total GDP:		4.48	2.16

== See also ==
- Distribution of wealth
- List of sovereign states by wealth inequality
- List of countries by income inequality
