= Income inequality in Sweden =

Sweden has moderate income inequality and a generally high standard of living. Unemployment was 9% as of 2026, one of the highest unemployment rates in the EU. The Nordic model of a social welfare society exemplified by Sweden and its near neighbours provides social welfare and includes many unemployment benefits for the poor, and amply funded health, housing and social security provision, within essentially corruption free nations subscribing to principles of a measure of openness of information about government activity. Income inequality in Sweden ranks as moderate in the Gini coefficient index, being 29.3 as of 2023 with inequality rising sharply since 2021.

Swedes pay very high taxes, some 52.1% of GDP (2014 est.) but correspondingly enjoy a very generous universal welfare state. Sweden's highest earning households have a somewhat lower share of income capital when compared to other countries; with the highest earning 10% having 24% of income or consumption (compared to the US, in which the highest earning 10% percent have 30% of income or consumption and Germany, have 24%, while Norway has 21.2%), and very low absolute poverty rates. However, more recent studies have shown the wealth gap to be growing in Sweden. In 2018 a leading Swiss bank claimed that in Sweden the highest 10% have 60-70% of the nation's wealth. The wealth inequality highlighted by the bank is accumulated wealth, not income inequality. Other studies have shown that the top 10% made 90% of 'capital income.' but still maintaining relatively low poverty rates. Ranked by inequality in accumulated wealth, Sweden is the 12th most unequal nation in the world as of 2021.

== Workers and growing inequality ==
In 2005, Sweden's labor force was estimated at 4.49 million persons. As of 2003, the services sector accounted for 75.1% of the workforce, with 22.6% engaged in industry, 2.1% in agriculture, and the remainder in undefined occupations. About 80% of Swedish wage earners are members of trade unions, and within certain industrial branches the percentage is even higher. The trade union movement is based on voluntary membership, and there is neither a closed shop nor a union shop. Although workers have the right to strike, employers also have the right to use the lockout. The labour workforce is mixed [In what sense?], and productivity has slightly weakened in recent months, but GDP per hour worked in Sweden remains very high.

In the last decades, there has been a growing number of low-skilled workers in the labor force competing for fewer and fewer occupations with lower educational and experience requirements. These types of job can include certain occupations in industry, and a number of occupations in services, administration and sales such as child care workers, kitchen and restaurant assistants, shop assistants, and cleaners. Many of these jobs are characterized by high staff turnover, which may initially appeal to people who want to gain a foothold in the Swedish labor market, but also entail potentially frustrating precarity.

According to a news report by thelocal.se, a 2008 change to Sweden's labour migration laws designed to make it easier for companies to recruit non-Europeans to hard-to-fill high-skilled jobs, has instead been used primarily to bring low-skilled workers to Sweden. "Only one third of the 60,000 jobs filled since the law came into effect have actually landed in the hands of the much-needed specialists." This suggests that non-EU workers may have a tougher time finding high-skilled jobs than getting low-skilled work.

Although income inequality between low-skilled and high-skilled workers is increasing, low-skilled workers are generally very well paid, and the lower and higher classes alike enjoy a very generous universal welfare state. Income taxes and cash benefits traditionally play an important role in redistributing income in Sweden, reducing inequality among the working-age population by about 28% (the OECD average [Of what?] is 25%). This redistributive effect has diminished over time, however, as it [What?] used to range between 35% and 40% prior to the mid-2000s.

The growth in inequality between 1985 and the early 2010s was the largest among all OECD countries, increasing by one third. In 2012, the average income of the top 10% of income earners was 6.3 times higher than that of the bottom 10%. This is up from a ratio of around 5.75 to 1 in 2007 and a ratio of around 4 to 1 during much of the 1990s.

In Sweden the Gini coefficient increased from 0.21 to 0.26 in 25 years; the ratio of disposable incomes between the richest and poorest population deciles increased from 4.1 to 5.8." In the same study, it was reported that the gap (of the percentage of population living in relative poverty) between those of immigrant status or foreign background and those of native origin was some 11%. And when comparing only those coming from non-EU countries with natives, it increased to 14.6%.

== Immigration and poverty ==
Sweden has a relatively high population of immigrant born and native population born to foreign-born parents. As of 2011, Statistics Sweden reported that around 19.6% or 1.858.000 inhabitants of Sweden were of non-native heritage, defined as born abroad or born in Sweden to two parents born abroad. Although Sweden does not officially record all residents' ethnic backgrounds, migrants' nationalities are recorded. The largest immigrant populations as of 2014 were from Finland, Iraq, and Poland (see Immigration to Sweden).

According to a study by Torun Österberg and Björn Gustafsson in 2014, when comparing the poverty rate between the immigrant population (in particular those of Turkey and Muslim countries) and the native population, it has been found that the most recent poverty rates among children with a Turkish background are three times higher than among native children. It has been a recent labour market trend that a high and increasing proportion of occupations require higher education, which many immigrants lack, resulting in increasing unemployment and poverty. This focus may, however, underplay the extent to which, prior to the era of mass migration, natives involuntarily out of paid employment were or were not in a certain degree of poverty.

Howbeit, it is known that ethnically heterogenous groups, with or without fluent Swedish, find it difficult to integrate into the native community, resulting in increasing marginalization. Another possible group of explanations for the employment problems of many immigrants is the difficulty of finding a job even if a person is qualified. The same study reported: "Results from a number of recent field experiments convincingly shows [sic: for 'show'] that many Swedish employers do not invite job applicants who are according to documents as qualified as natives but have attributes signaling a Muslim or another non-western foreign background." This would suggest that native Swedes nurtured in a homogeneous, relatively egalitarian social welfare society are not necessarily cosmopolitan or inclusive in their social attitudes.

In this study, it has been reported that the adjusted percentage difference compared to children with Swedish-born parents in the second generation, in 2008–2010 in Iraqi descendants is 37%, while in those from Greece and Hungary it is 23%.There has been a rapidly increased gap in income between the second generation of people with a background in 'Muslim' countries, compared with those with a heritage in other countries and with native Swedes. This first took place from the early 1980s to the late 1990s, when the economy contracted and employment shrank. (see, Economy of Sweden;).

== See also ==
- List of countries by income equality
