= Equality =

Equality generally refers to the fact of being equal, of having the same value. In specific contexts, equality may refer to:

== Society ==
- Egalitarianism, a trend of thought that favors equality for all people
  - Political egalitarianism, in which all members of a society are of equal standing
- Equal opportunity, a stipulation that all people should be treated similarly
- Equality of outcome, in which the general conditions of people's lives are similar
- Substantive equality, equality of outcome for groups
- For specific groups:
  - Gender equality
  - Racial equality
- Social equality, in which all people within a group have the same status
- Economic inequality
- Equality Party (disambiguation), several political parties
- Consociationalism, in which an ethnically, religiously, or linguistically divided state functions by cooperation of each group's elites

== Law ==
- Equality before the law, the principle under which all people are subject to the same laws
- Equality Act (disambiguation), several pieces of legislation

== Mathematics and logic ==
- Equality (mathematics), the relationship between expressions that represent the same value or mathematical object
- Equals sign, =
- Logical equality

== Places ==
- Equality, Alabama, an unincorporated community
- Equality Township, Gallatin County, Illinois
  - Equality, Illinois, a village
- Equality Township, Red Lake County, Minnesota
- Equality Colony, an American socialist colony founded in 1897 in Washington state

== Arts and entertainment ==
- Equality (film), a 2010 American documentary short film by Al Sutton
- Equality (novel), an 1897 utopian novel by Edward Bellamy
- Equality; or, A History of Lithconia, an 1837 utopian fantasy novel by an anonymous author

== See also ==
- Equal (disambiguation)
- Inequality (disambiguation)
- Equity (disambiguation)
- Liberté, égalité, fraternité (liberty, equality, fraternity), motto of the French Revolution
