= Income equality =

Income equality may refer to:

- Economic egalitarianism, a state of economic affairs in which equality of outcome has been manufactured for all participants
- Economic inequality, differences in the distribution of wealth and income within or between populations or individuals
- Distribution of wealth, comparison of the wealth of various members or groups in a society

== See also ==
- List of countries by income equality
