= Equity =

Equity may refer to:

== Finance, accounting and ownership ==
- Equity (finance), ownership of assets that have liabilities attached to them
  - Stock, equity based on original contributions of cash or other value to a business
  - Home equity, the difference between the market value and unpaid mortgage balance on a home
  - Private equity, stock in a privately held company
  - The equity method of accounting for large investment interests

== Business, justice and law ==
- Equity (law), in common law jurisdictions
- Equity (economics), the study of fairness in economics
- Educational equity, the study and achievement of population-proportionate group inclusion and credentialing in education
- Intergenerational equity, equality and fairness in relationships between people in different generations (including those yet to be born)
- Equity theory, on the relations and perceptions of fairness in distributions of resources within social and professional situations.
- Employment equity (Canada), policy requiring or encouraging the hiring of disenfranchised minorities
- Health equity, fairness and justice in health and healthcare

== Education and social sciences ==
- Social equity

== Companies and organizations ==
The word equity is also used in the names of the following companies and organizations:

=== Companies ===
- Equity Industries, an electronics subsidiary of Chiaphua Components Group
- Equity Music Group, a defunct American country music record label, founded by Clint Black
- EQ Office, one of the largest owners and managers of office buildings in the United States

=== Organizations ===
- Actors' Equity Association, United States labor union of actors and stage managers
- American Society of Equity, United States agrarian reform organization
- Canadian Actors' Equity Association, an association in Canada
- Equity (British trade union) (formerly British Actors' Equity Association), an association in the United Kingdom
- Forum Party of Alberta, a defunct political party from Alberta, Canada also known as the Equity Party
- Transportation Equity Network, American organization advocating equity-based transportation policies

== Other ==
- Equity, Ohio, a community in the United States
- In poker strategy, a player's expected share of the pot
- In backgammon, the average expected value that will be won or lost
- Brand equity, in marketing, the value built up in a brand
- Equity (film), a 2016 American film directed by Meera Menon
- Equity (typeface), also known as Ehrhardt, a font designed by Matthew Butterick
- Urban forest inequity

== See also ==
- Equity Bank (disambiguation)
- Equality (disambiguation)
- Inequality (disambiguation)
