= Freedom from discrimination =

The right to freedom from discrimination is internationally recognised as a human right and enshrines the principle of egalitarianism. The right to freedom from discrimination is recognised in the Universal Declaration of Human Rights and enshrined in international human rights law through its inclusion in the International Covenant on Civil and Political Rights and the International Covenant on Economic, Social and Cultural Rights.

The right to freedom from discrimination is particularly relevant for groups that have been historically discriminated against and "vulnerable" groups. In this respect, the right to freedom from discrimination has been elaborated upon in the International Convention on the Elimination of All Forms of Racial Discrimination, the Convention on the Elimination of All Forms of Discrimination Against Women, and the Convention on the Rights of Persons with Disabilities.

== Human Rights ==
The concept of the right to freedom from discrimination is to the concept of human rights, as human rights are the rights of all humans. The Universal Declaration of Human Rights (UDHR), adopted in 1948, starts with the words "Whereas recognition is the foundation of freedom, justice and peace in the world."

Article 1 of the UDHR states:

"All human beings are born free and equal in dignity and rights. They are endowed with reason and conscience and should act towards one another in a spirit of brotherhood."

Article 2 of the UDHR states:

"Everyone is entitled to all the rights and freedoms set forth in this Declaration, without distinction of any kind, such as race, color, sex, language, religion, political or other opinion, national or social origin, property, birth or other status. Furthermore, no distinction shall be made on the basis of the political, jurisdictional or international status of the country or territory to which a person belongs, whether it be independent, trust, non-self-governing or under any other limitation of sovereignty."

== See also ==
- Discrimination
- Equality (disambiguation)
- Group rights
- Individual rights
- Racism
- Sexism
- Homophobia
