= Equalizer =

Equalizer, Equaliser, or The Equalizer may refer to:

== Science and technology ==
- Equalizer (audio), a device used for adjusting the volume of different frequency bands within an audio signal
- Equaliser (electrical), a device used to eliminate circulating currents in machines whose armature windings are arranged in two or more parallel portions.
- Equalizer (communications), a device or circuit for correction of frequency dependent distortion in telecommunications
- Equaliser (mathematics), a construction in category theory
- Whippletree (mechanism), a linkage also referred to as an equalizer

== Arts and entertainment ==
- Equalizer (Datel), a game-hacking cheat cartridge by Datel
- "Equalizer" (k-os song), a song by hip hop artist k-os
- The Equalizer, an American spy thriller television and film franchise including:
  - The Equalizer (1985 TV series)
  - The Equalizer (2021 TV series), reboot of the 1985 TV series
  - The Equalizer (film), a 2014 film loosely based on the 1985 TV series
  - The Equalizer 2, a 2018 film and the sequel to the 2014 film
  - The Equalizer 3, a 2023 film and the sequel to the 2018 film
- Dave Sullivan (wrestler) (born 1960), American retired wrestler, stagename "The Equalizer"
- Equalizers, the magical girl protagonists in the Japanese multimedia franchise The Girl in Twilight
- "The Equalizer", an NFL Films song by Sam Spence
- "Equalizer", a song by Denzel Curry from the EP 13

== Other uses ==
- GAU-12 Equalizer, a type of Gatling gun
- Equaliser (sports), a goal or run that ties the game
- Equalizer (munition), a Ukrainian guided bomb

== See also ==
- Equalizer hitch, a type of towing hitch used to better distribute the load on a towing vehicle
- Equalization (disambiguation)
- Equal (disambiguation)
