= Samta =

Samta may refer to:

- Samta, India, a village and a gram panchayat in Howrah, West Bengal, India
- Samtah or Samta, a village and sub-division in Jizan Province, Saudi Arabia
- Samta colony, an area in Raipur, Chhattisgarh, India
- Samta sthal, the memorial to Jagjivan Ram, in the vicinity of Raj Ghat, in Delhi, India

== People with the name ==
- Samta Prasad, an Indian classical musician and a tabla player from the Benares gharana
- Samta Benyahia, an Algerian French artist

== See also ==
- Samata (disambiguation)
