= Equal =

Equal(s) may refer to:

== Mathematics ==
- Equality (mathematics).
- Equals sign (=), a mathematical symbol used to indicate equality.

== Arts and entertainment ==
- Equals (film), a 2015 American science fiction film
- Equals (game), a board game
- The Equals, a British pop group formed in 1965
- "Equal", a 2016 song by Chrisette Michele from Milestone
- "Equal", a 2022 song by Odesza featuring Låpsley from The Last Goodbye
- "Equals", a 2009 song by Set Your Goals from This Will Be the Death of Us
- Equal (TV series), a 2020 American docuseries on HBO
- = (album), a 2021 album by Ed Sheeran
- "=", a 2022 song by J-Hope from Jack in the Box

== Other uses ==
- Equal (sweetener), a brand of artificial sweetener
- EQUAL Community Initiative, an initiative within the European Social Fund of the European Union

== See also ==
- Equality (disambiguation)
- Equalizer (disambiguation)
- Equalization (disambiguation)
