= Wealth inequality in Latin America =

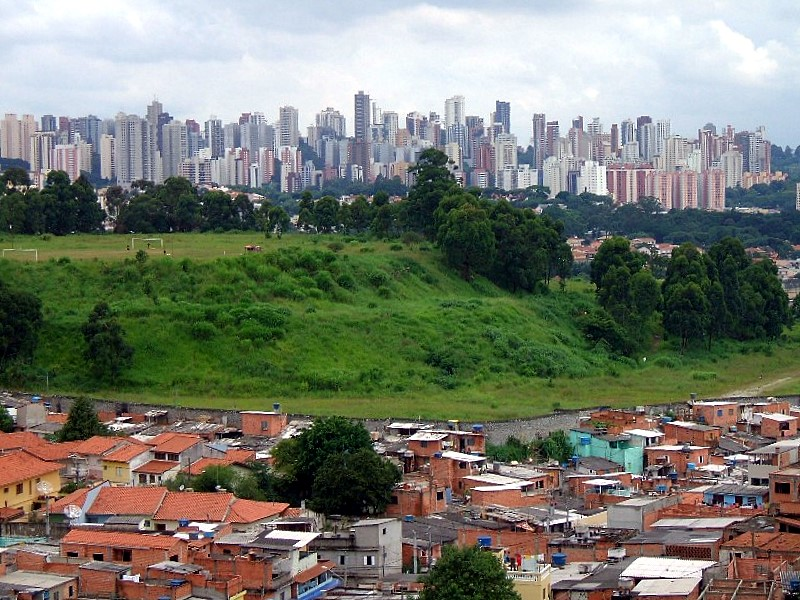
Slums on the outskirts of a wealthy urban area in São Paulo, Brazil.

Wealth inequality in Latin America and the Caribbean refers to economic discrepancies among people of the region. According to the United Nations Economic Commission for Latin America and the Caribbean, Latin America is the most unequal region in the world.

== Studies ==
A report release in 2013 by the UN Department of Economic and Social Affairs entitled Inequality Matters. Report of the World Social Situation, observed that: ‘Declines in the wage share have been attributed to the impact of labour-saving technological change and to a general weakening of labour market regulations and institutions. Such declines are likely to affect individuals in the middle and bottom of the income distribution disproportionately, since they rely mostly on labour income.’ In addition, the report noted that ‘highly-unequal land distribution has created social and political tensions and is a source of economic inefficiency, as small landholders frequently lack access to credit and other resources to increase productivity, while big owners may not have had enough incentive to do so.

Inequality is undermining the region's economic potential and the well-being of its population, since it increases poverty and reduces the impact of economic development on poverty reduction. Children in Latin America are often forced to seek work on the streets when their families can no longer afford to support them, leading to a substantial population of street children in Latin America. According to some estimates, there are 40 million street children in Latin America. Inequality in Latin America has deep historical roots in race and ethnicity made prevalent during colonial times. Inequality has been reproduced and transmitted through generations because Latin American political systems allow a differentiated access on the influence that social groups have in the decision-making process, and it responds in different ways to the least favored groups that have less political representation and capacity of pressure. Recent economic liberalisation also plays a role as not everyone is equally capable of taking advantage of its benefits. Differences in opportunities and endowments tend to be based on race, ethnicity, rurality and gender. Because inequality in gender and location are near universal, race and ethnicity play a larger, more integral role in the unequal discriminatory practices in Latin America. These variations significantly affect how money, power, and status are distributed.

In 2008, according to UNICEF, the Latin America and the Caribbean region had the highest combined income inequality in the world with a measured net Gini coefficient of 48.3, an unweighted average which is considerably higher than the world's Gini coefficient average of 39.7. Gini is the statistical measurement used to measure income distribution across entire nations and their populations and their income inequality. The other regional averages were: sub-Saharan Africa (44.2), Asia (40.4), Middle East and North Africa (39.2), Eastern Europe and Central Asia (35.4), and high-income nations (30.9). There are many different approaches to measuring inequality. In one of the studies by Baten and Fraunholz (2004), the authors chose an anthropometric approach, namely height inequality in order to see if inequality itself is a threat to globalization and whether openness increases inequality by using the coefficient of height variation. "This measure covers not only wage recipients (as some other inequality indices do), but also the self-employed, the unemployed, housewives, children, and other groups who may not be participating in a market economy. In addition, this variable has the advantage to be an outcome indicator, whereas real income is an input to human utility."

According to a study by the World Bank, the richest decile of the population of Latin America earn 47% of the total income, while the poorest 10% of the population earn only 1.6% of the income. In contrast, in developed countries, the top decile receives 29% of the total income, while the bottom decile earns 2.5%. The countries with the highest inequality in the region (as measured with the Gini index in the UN Development Report) in 2007 were Haiti (59.5), Colombia (58.5), Bolivia (58.2), Honduras (55.3), Brazil (55.0), and Panama (54.9), while the countries with the lowest inequality in the region were Venezuela (43.4), Uruguay (46.4) and Costa Rica (47.2).

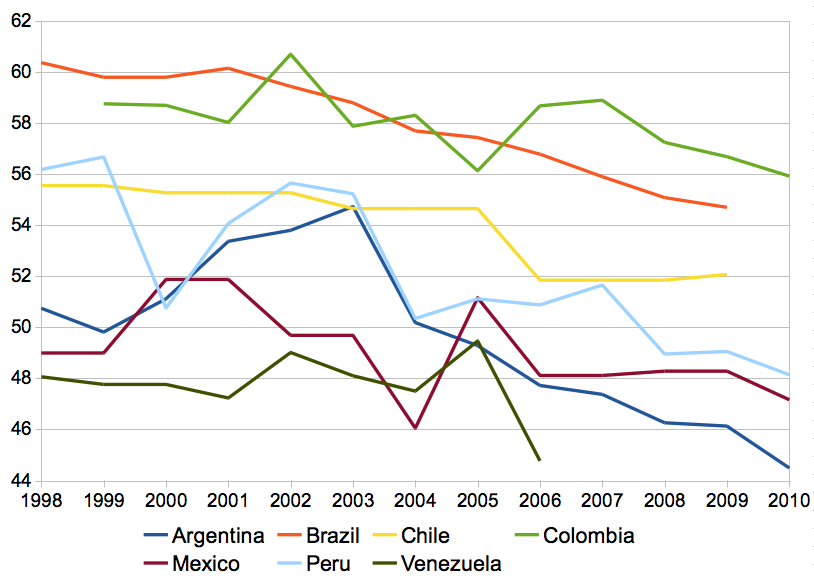
Trends on income inequality 1998–2010 in 7 Latin American countries (Argentina, Brazil, Chile, Colombia, Mexico, Peru, Venezuela). Source of the data: World Bank.

According to the World Bank, the poorest countries in the region were (as of 2008): Haiti, Nicaragua, Bolivia and Honduras. Undernourishment affects 47% of Haitians, 27% of Nicaraguans, 23% of Bolivians and 22% of Hondurans.

Many countries in Latin America have responded to high levels of poverty by implementing new, or altering old, social assistance programs such as conditional cash transfers. These include Mexico's Progresa Oportunidades, Brazil's Bolsa Escola and Bolsa Familia, Panama's Red de Oportunidades and Chile's Chile Solidario. In general, these programs provide money to poor families under the condition that those transfers are used as an investment on their children's human capital, such as regular school attendance and basic preventive health care. The purpose of these programs is to address the inter-generational transmission of poverty and to foster social inclusion by explicitly targeting the poor, focusing on children, delivering transfers to women, and changing social accountability relationships between beneficiaries, service providers and governments. These programs have helped to increase school enrollment and attendance and they also have shown improvements in children's health conditions. Most of these transfer schemes are now benefiting around 110 million people in the region and are considered relatively cheap, costing around 0.5% of their GDP. In some countries e.g. in Peru decentralisation is hoped to help address social justice and poverty better. NGOs which addressed those problems on the local level before could help with that.

== Sources ==
- This article incorporates text from a free content work. Licensed under CC-BY-SA IGO 3.0 (license statement/permission). Text taken from Rethinking Education: Towards a global common good?, 24, UNESCO. UNESCO.
- Allen, Paul C. (2000). Philip III and the Pax Hispanica, 1598–1621: The Failure of Grand Strategy. Yale Historical Publications Series. New Haven: Yale University Press. ISBN 978-0300087185.
