= Income inequality in Denmark =

Denmark has been noted as having one of the lowest income inequality ratings in the world and has been known to maintain relative stability in this metric throughout decades past. The OECD data of 2016 gives Denmark a Gini coefficient of 0.249, below the OECD average of 0.315. The OECD in 2013 ranked Denmark with having a 0.254 Gini coefficient, ranking third behind Iceland and Norway respectively as the countries with the lowest income inequality qualifications. Eurostat ranked Denmark with a Gini coefficient of equivalised disposable income of 27.0 in 2022, having fallen for three straight years from a high of 27.8 in 2018. The Gini coefficients are measured using a 0–1 calibration where 0 equals complete equality and 1 equals complete inequality. "Wage-distributive outcomes" and their effect on income equality have been noted since the 1970s and 80s. Denmark, along with other Nordic countries, such as Finland and Sweden, has long held a stable low wage inequality index as well.

The scope and strength of Denmark's redistributive system and the latitude of the welfare state are the reasons for Denmark's low levels of inequality. The welfare system, in particular, allows for negligible effects that market income inequality can have on "disposable income inequality (i.e. market income after taxes and transfers)". The rise in income inequality all over the world, though, has not shielded Denmark and has seen its inequality increase in the same rate as all the other OECD countries, pairing Denmark with the likes of the United States and Canada with their pace in inequality intensification. The global course towards rising income inequality in the rich world and in Denmark has been attributed to an increase in capital incomes, a rising gap in "earnings dispersion", and structural changes that have taken place within households; the long-term propellant of inequality, though, has been skill-biased technical change. Rising inequality in Denmark can be illustrated by how the boon of GDP growth has gone to households of higher incomes, though the income distribution has been relatively equitably discharged throughout the country from the mid-1980s to the mid-2000s.

== Intergenerational earnings elasticity ==
Economist Miles Corak has documented a relationship called "The Great Gatsby Curve". In this measure, Corak has been able to plot the positive relationship between intergenerational mobility and inequality, and how this relates to the broader concept of equality of opportunity. Corak has stated that in Nordic countries, like Denmark, there is a statistically weak tie between the economic status and earnings of the parents and their adult children, since less than one-fifth of any economic advantage or disadvantage that a father may have had is passed on to an adult son. This "weak tie" is translated to mean that there is a low intergenerational earnings elasticity in Denmark since there is a high level of social mobility and equality of opportunity.

Miles Corak believes that the Great Gatsby Curve should not be treated as a blueprint or model for making economic changes. Also, Corak notes that Denmark may not be the most appropriate model for comparison in analyzing economic policies since it has a small and relatively homogeneous population, which is not easily comparable to large and demographically diverse countries such as the United States.

The Danish intergenerational elasticity of income is flat across the lower parts of the parental distribution, and then rises at the higher end. This means that being raised by a low-income father contributes to no earnings disadvantage, but being raised by a high-income father confers some advantage. This illustrates that there is still a high and strong transmission of economic status at the top income levels, even in the relatively mobile country of Denmark. Specifically, it is shown that the intergenerational transmission of earnings at the very top is associated with the intergenerational transmission of employers since sons of top-earning fathers are more likely to fall from the top strata if they do not work for the same employer that their father had worked for prior.

== Educational assortative mating ==
Danish income inequality is relatively low, yet the rate of educational homogamy has declined despite increasing levels of educational attainment. In research done by Richard Breen and Signe Hald Andersen, they have found that in Denmark, with a rather more regulated labor market, the education of an individual is more closely related to his or her income. These researches have found this to be particularly the case for women in Denmark. The authors develop this as a consequence of the highly developed Danish welfare state, and the subsequent high levels of participation of married women in the labour force. Approximately 87% of married women participate in the labour force, and this participation is generally uninterrupted for child-rearing since there are extremely generous parental leave policies, as well as free or highly subsidized child daycare. Denmark presents a unique case since there is an illustrated causal link between the changes in educational assortative mating and earnings or income inequality.

== How income inequality relates to happiness ==
Modern studies have posited a possible link between low levels of income inequality and happiness. Denmark, in terms of happiness, ranks as 1st in the World Happiness Report of 2016, with a score of 7.526. The report remarks that among the factors used in the past in evaluating happiness, incomes, healthy lifestyles and social support have ranked as the highest in their importance. Income inequality, in particular, across various studies have seen a direct correlation with happiness: "Individuals tend to declare lower happiness levels when inequality happens to be high...[and there is] strong negative effects of inequality on the happiness of the European poor and leftists". Danish society is for the most part of a leftish orientation politically. Documented from 1980 to 1987, the level of happiness declined as inequality increased in Denmark. Danish society, as well as their European counterparts, perceive high levels of inequality as more egregious than other non-Europeans countries, such as in the United States, for example.

As has been remarked, low levels of inequality are aided by government redistribution, which can, in turn, lead to higher levels of happiness. In order to rein in inequality, the redistributive mechanisms of the state need to be strengthened. Denmark and the Nordic countries also have the lowest levels of individual earnings inequality and this is due to the high capacity of the redistributive system. The links between happiness, equality and redistribution need to be explored further, though, as many studies have appeared to contradict a strong correlation between them.

Among these studies there is a negative correlation between happiness and income inequality: "It seems rather evident that people live happier in the most egalitarian societies and that the differences in happiness will be smaller. Yet in this issue, we have seen that this does not apply to all inequalities and particularly not to income inequality. Income inequality is essentially unrelated to the average happiness of citizens and only modestly related to the dispersion of happiness among them." In the World Happiness Report for Denmark, the authors fashion a new approach where they measure happiness in terms of "inequality of well-being". The novelty of the approach needs to garner more consensus to add to the research between happiness and inequality. Nonetheless, using this approach, the report found that while income is an important factor, equality of well-being and life satisfaction are better indicators of happiness. Denmark ranks high on life satisfaction and in how they perceive themselves and others to be happy; meaning the inequality of well-being in Denmark is low.

Evidence suggests that a relationship may yet exist between income and happiness, but using metrics such as the Gallup World poll, happiness gaps among countries, and in Denmark in particular, may have deeper unknown variables at work that transcend income inequality. General disparities of inequality in Danish society are low and are a part of the broader moral philosophy of egalitarianism that is characteristic of Scandinavia and holds that policymakers be morally impelled to suppress inequality as much as possible. Denmark, in terms of this institutional egalitarianism, has been labelled as having a social-democratic regime of welfare. The substantiality of the welfare state's reach in Denmark concerning income equality has led it to protect its citizens against the worst impact of the market and capitalism's more destabilizing effects. Even amid bad economic conditions in Denmark's past, poverty has lessened and standards of living and equality have increased. The preponderance of the evidence between income inequality and happiness suggests a possible link, but more research is needed for far-ranging conclusions.
