= Equality (film) =

- Directed by: Al Sutton
- Produced by: Al Sutton; Barbara Masry
- Cinematography: Al Sutton; Jeff Danneman
- Edited by: Al Sutton; Jeanne McGill
- Music by: Maurice Ravel
- Production company: Al Sutton Pictures
- Release date: February 2010
- Running time: 6 minutes
- Country: United States
- Language: English

Equality is a short film by American filmmaker, Al Sutton, MD, a documentary under the genre of human rights, social issues, history and news. The film contains rare footage of the Women's Strike for Equality, the gender equality protest of August 26, 1970, where more than fifty thousand women and men gathered in New York City to show support for the feminist movement and to commemorate the 50th anniversary of the Nineteenth Amendment to the United States Constitution which gave women the right to vote. It was organized by NOW, the National Organization for Women.

While it depicts a positive energy and excitement of the crowds at the 1970 women's march and rally, the film makes the statement that in spite of various attempts to codify equality, for example, the UN General Assembly Bill of Rights of 1979, the statistics related to gender inequality show that areas such as education, earnings, poverty and abuses still need effective change.

This short film, EQUALITY, released in 2010, is a simple documentation of the women's strike that moved forward the United States in terms of gender equality, and perhaps impacted the world. Ravel's "Pavane for a Dead Princess" comprises the musical score.
