= Samata (NGO) =

Indian non-governmental organization focused on tribal communities

Samata is an India-based non-governmental organization that focuses on advocacy and development issues among tribal communities in Andhra Pradesh. Samata aims to help tribal groups address problems of land alienation, displacement, and political dis-empowerment. Its mission is to uphold the traditional, constitutional, and human rights of the tribal or adivasi people. Samata focuses primarily on projects in the tribal villages of East Godavari and Vizag districts in the state of Andhra Pradesh, India. This region forms a part of the Eastern Ghats range of mountains.

== See also ==
- Samata Party (Dead Link)
