= Equality Party =

Equality Party may refer to the following political organisations:

- Musavat, Azerbaijan
- Equality Party (Chile)
- Equality Party (Quebec), Canada
- Equality Party (United Kingdom)
- Social Democratic Party (Faroe Islands) (Javnaðarflokkurin, lit. 'Equality Party')
- Australian Equality Party (Marriage)

== See also ==
- Samata Party (disambiguation) (lit. 'Equality Party')
- Social Democratic Alliance (lit. 'The Alliance – Iceland's Equality Party')
- Socialist Equality Party, in various countries
- Women's Equality Party, UK
- Women's Equality Party (New York)
