= Income inequality in the Philippines =

Income inequality in the Philippines refers to the unequal distribution of income among individuals or households in the Philippines.

== Overview ==
Based on gathered data, the gross domestic product (GDP) of the Philippines has been growing at a rate of 6.8%.

Year	Annual GDP growth rate, constant prices
2008	4.153
2009	1.148
2010	7.632
2011	3.66
2012	6.801
2013	7.181
2014	6.096
2015	6.13
2016	6.9
2017	7.71
2018	6.34
2019	6.12
2020	minus 9.57

_{Source:Philippines GDP-Real Growth Rate-Economy(www.indexmundi.com)}

According to World Bank Country Director Motoo Konishi, the Philippines had become a "rising tiger" in East Asia. However, at the same time, during the 2010–2011 fiscal year, the increase in the wealth of the richest families in the Philippines, amounting to 47.39%, comprised 76.5% of the GDP increase for that year. Thus, the benefits of this economic growth has not yet trickled down to the poorer segments of the population, as seen with the malnutrition, and poverty that continue to plague the country despite the fact that the economy seems to be growing.

According to Albert and Ramon, the poorest 20% of the population only had a share of 4.45% of the national income. This shows that the distribution of wealth is uneven in the Philippines for the data shows that the poorest 20% earned 14,022 pesos while the richest 20% of 176,863 pesos.

== Measurement ==
=== Gini Index ===
The Gini coefficient is also known as Gini index or Gini Ratio. It measures the degree of inequality in the distribution of family income in a country. A Lorenz curve plots the cumulative percentages of total income received against the cumulative number of recipients, starting with the poorest individual or household. The Gini index measures the area between the Lorenz curve and a hypothetical line of absolute equality, expressed as a percentage of the maximum area under the line. If income distribution were more nearly equal, the index would be lower or nearer to zero; if income distribution were more unequal, the index would be higher or nearer to 100. Zero indicates perfect equality, while 100 indicates perfect inequality. In the Philippines in 2015, the Gini Coefficient was approximately 0.4439. This is a slightly smaller number in comparison to a few years prior (in 2012, 0.4605). This means a bit more even wealth distribution across families. [3]

=== Palma Ratio ===
The Palma ratio is an alternative measure of inequality based on the work of Gabriel Palma. It is ratio of the top 10% of population's share of gross national income (GNI), divided by the poorest 40% of the population's share of GNI. Palma suggests that distributional politics relates mainly to the struggle between the rich and poor, and who the middle classes side with.

The Palma ratio could be a good comparison to the Gini coefficient measurement, and could cater the disadvantages of the commonly used Gini. These disadvantages include the fact that the measurement may give different results for individuals as compared to households. Furthermore, countries that are more diverse will display a higher regional coefficient than it does individually.

== Historical background ==
=== Second World War (1942–1945) ===
When the Japanese occupied the Philippines, those who were ruthless enough to deal with their fellow Filipinos as well as the Japanese forces became part of the elite. However, the number of people who fell to the lower classes increased and thus, became the main problem of the post-war period. The number of people who fell into poverty increased because of the fighting which led to personal and property loss, monumental destruction, and social upheaval.

Since production was practically destroyed people engaged in the buy-and-sell business. To encourage this, the Japanese created the so-called "Mickey Mouse" Money as their currency for the occupied Philippines and this caused inflation. An effect of this inflation was that prices rose to astronomical levels. A good example of this would be matches being sold at 100 "Mickey Mouse" Pesos. This kind of money caused inflation because the Japanese had no way of backing it, thus it was worthless.

By the end of the war, irrigation facilities in farms were damaged and destroyed, and agricultural lands were neglected. Livestock also was reduced to 65%, thus a scarcity of food resulted and thus, family heads padded the numbers of their family members to get more food, thus becoming hoarders. Due to this hoarding, prices rose and thus, President Osmeña tried to solve this by prescribing the maximum prices for goods. However, in reality, the real market prices were way higher than those stated by Osmeña's order. Due to this, people had no choice but to follow the higher prices set by profiteers, since money was already circulating.

Because of lack of food and economic dislocation, people could be seen on the streets scavenging for food or dying from disease while those who were able to profit from the buy-and-sell business and war profiteers were able to join the upper class. Thus, during the Second World War, the already-present problem of income inequality grew larger to the extent that its effects, like crimes such as theft, kidnapping, and murder occur regularly.

=== Republic of the Philippines (1946–1972) ===
After the Philippines became an independent nation in 1946, the politics of the nation remained as it was during the period before the war even though in theory, it was a constitutional republic similar to that of the United States. However, the gap in income between the wealthy landlords and their tenants and the landless workers was so great that it led to the problem of agrarian unrest and the Huk movement. This movement was crushed by President Ramon Magsaysay using reforms and military force. During Magsaysay's term, the country began to prosper again due to the war reparations from the Japanese and US Korean War spending.

Despite Magsaysay taking time to listen to the masses and doing his best to develop the impoverished areas of the country, he failed to really improve their lot because they became dependent on him to uplift them. This was because he had failed to tell them that he needed their help and he lacked a blueprint for uplifting them and ending their gap with the rich. Thus, Magsaysay failed to put an end to the inequality between the masses and the elites.

When Diosdado Macapagal was elected president to succeed Carlos P. Garcia, his plan for the economy stated that he planned to resolve income inequality by making possible conditions that provided more income to those who need more to be able to meet their basic needs. He also planned to continue President Garcia's "Austerity Program" with his slogan of "simple living". However, this plan was undermined by his fellow Kapampangans and other members of the elite for they threw luxurious parties for him. Thus, Macapagal's "simple living" turned out to be mere rhetoric and only was true for the poor.

=== Martial Law (1972–1991) ===
In 1972, President Ferdinand Marcos placed the Philippines in a state of Martial Law promising economic growth and making it more acceptable to the business and international community while allowing Marcos even more control over the Philippine economy. According to Marcos, his New Society, which was supposed to be the result of Martial Law, was based on the discontent of the poor which led to their struggle against the ruling classes. To help alleviate the unequal distribution of wealth in the Philippines, Marcos ordered that all land holdings that were larger than 7 hectares were to be distributed to landless tenants while the owners were given just compensation.

Another reform implemented by Marcos during the Martial Law period was that corporations were ordered to start selling their shares to the public so that these companies were no longer owned only by a single family and their friends, but also by those who were willing to become shareholders by purchasing stocks. This reform helped alleviate income inequality to a certain extent for it allowed income to be distributed to the lower middle class.

However, the "crony capitalism" of President Ferdinand Marcos only made the gap between rich and poor wider because funds that could have been used for crucial development needs were siphoned off to be used for the benefit of Marcos and his allies. Due to this, the problem of income inequality that was very much present even during the period of the Third Republic was made worse. This led Rep. Stephen Solarz of the 13th District of New York to observe in 1986 that more than half of the Filipino population was living in squalor while Marcos and his allies were living in luxury.

Real wages fell from 1970 and 1975 and remained stagnant until 1986. While poverty incidence was 42% in the 1960s, it rose to 52% in 1971 and 59% toward the end of Marcos's dictatorship. Due to the economic decline that began under Marcos's martial law, the Philippines was sometimes called the "sick man of Asia".

=== EDSA Revolution to the present (1986– ) ===
Due to the success of the EDSA Revolution, Marcos and his family fled to Hawaii and Corazon Aquino became the new Philippine President. When she took power, President Aquino was able to restore democracy and basic rights such as the writ of habeas corpus and free speech. However, when she redistributed the corporations of the cronies, these companies were sold to Chinese businessmen and members of the old elite. President Aquino was an honest leader, but she was not able to solve other issues because of instability caused by attempted coups staged by the military which tried to overthrow her government.

When Fidel Ramos succeeded Cory Aquino, he relaxed government regulations in order to allow entrepreneurs to be able to compete with foreign corporations and he was able to end the electricity crisis of his predecessor's regime. Ramos was also able to make the economy more transparent by introducing a banking reform, which allowed local and foreign banks to compete. In his SONA, President Ramos also planned to create socialized housing for the poor and more importantly, to give them the tools to earn a better living by means of credit and land reform. President Ramos also swore to make the taxation system more equitable and progressive. At the same time, he also expanded the VAT in order to simplify sales taxes.

In 2005, President Gloria Arroyo implemented the E-VAT which fixed the value-added tax at 12%, which ended up cancelling out the 25 peso raise in the minimum wage. It was also said that this increase in VAT was supposed to target the rich who buy more high-end goods, but they can pay it. However, the poor are more affected because they have to cut their expenses. This is because electricity rates were also affected by VAT, which ends up shrinking the income of the poor due to more expenses.

== By region ==
=== Overview ===
Based on the data gathered by the Philippine Statistics Authority, the region with the highest income is the National Capital region while the lowest is that of the ARMM. More recently in 2018, ARMM had the lowest average gross regional domestic product (Per Capita); the number sits at 0.5%.

=== Regional analysis ===
The regions have had a steady and substantial growth in their Gini coefficients because of the negative correlation between growth within each regions and the inequality experienced in the region The measure of growth between each region will be based on the Philippine Development Plan 2011 – 2016; a framework of inclusive growth, which is high growth that is sustained, generates mass employment and reduces poverty. It intends to pursue rapid and sustainable economic growth and development, improve the quality of life of the Filipino, empower the poor and marginalized and enhance our social cohesion as a nation and will serve as the guide to formulating policies and implementing development programs for the next six years.

==== Luzon (Outside Metro Manila) ====
The Cordillera Administrative Region's economy, according to NEDA's Regional Developmental Plan (RDP), had experienced stationary growth from 2004 – 2009 but economic growth stayed positive through infusions of National government funds on roads and growth of the Business Process Outsourcing Center (BPO). It hopes to achieve sustained economic growth and environmental equity and sustainable source of resources among the other goals. In 2012, CAR was contributing P12.3 billion to the country's mining industry in terms of mineral production. Region I or the Ilocos Region showed an increase in Gross Domestic Regional Product and the Ilocos Regional Developmental Plan for 2011 – 2016 of NEDA shows goals to achieve sustainable economic growth in agribusiness, infrastructure, trade and tourism and job opportunities Region II or the Cagayan Valley region, according to its RDP from NEDA, performed well from the span of 2004 – 2012 with fluctuations in performances in regional income, inflation and labor and employment and have intentions of development opportunities, with agri-based industrial, commercial and tourism potential. Central Luzon or Region III has had high and sustained growth as one of the major contributors of national output with a slow decline from 1993 to 2009. The RDP aims at the improvement of agricultural productivity, farming family incomes, land transportation access and tourism along with the other goals. CALABARZON have also propelled in their economy regarding their agriculture, industries and MSMEs (Micro and Small Medium Enterprises) and the recent urbanization of the region with other possibilities for developmental projects like subdivisions, leisure centers and industrial complexes. It, along with Region III join NCR as the top three regions with the biggest shares of total income generated from local sources, mostly from tax revenues. Their RDP is focused then on tourism and infrastructure, agribusiness and information technologies, business process (BPOs) and creative industries. MIMAROPA or Region IV – B is the fastest growing region in terms of GRDP in 2007 though it slowly declined in the latter years because of the negative growth rate in all sectors. They plan on further developing their physical connectivity, agriculture and tourism development, enterprise development, particularly of micro- small and medium scale enterprises (MSMEs) the 2015 Millennium Development Goals (MDGs); housing and settlements development; and good governance, according to its RDP. Bicol Region or Region V, records the fastest growing GRDP in 2009 due to mining and quarrying. Despite the positive, there are still poor families in the region, mainly because of unemployment, rooted in education and specialization of work. Their challenges for their RDP are on Basic needs like Education and Housing to Economic growth on agriculture, fishery, forestry, mining, quarrying, manufacturing, trade and tourism.

==== Visayas ====
The gross regional domestic program (GRDP) of Western Visayas grew at an annual average of 5.9 percent from 2004 to 2009. This was notably higher than the national growth of 4.7 percent during those years. The growth was largely because of the industry sector primarily because of the manufacturing and quarrying of coal in Semirara Island, Caluya and Antique. Western Visayas is also known for its agriculture based economy which managed to grow steadily at 3.0 percent from 2004 to 2009 except for 2004 where it grew a notable 7.0 percent. The construction of infrastructure in the past few years resulted in the expansion of the industry section. Because of this growth, the Western Visayas economy increased its contribution to the gross domestic product in 2009 to 7.6 percent from the 7.3 percent in 2008.

In Central Visayas, the long-term goal is for it to be the leading growth center in the country, that would steer the Philippine economy into greater heights. The goal is to have Central Visayas known locally and internationally as the premier tourist destination and the centre of trade and industry in the country. Both government and private sectors will work together to accelerate the growth of the regional economy to an average of 7.2 percent to 7.7 percent for 2011–2016.

From 2004 to 2009, the gross regional domestic product (GRDP) of Eastern Visayas grew at an average rate of 3.6 percent. This was short of the RDP target of 6.1 percent and the national growth rate of 4.8 percent. The region's contribution to the national economy remains at 2.2 percent. The decline in 2009 was largely due to heavy rains and infestation of pests and deceases in major production areas. The biggest contributor to the regional economy is the agriculture and fishery subsectors which account for 33.5 percent of the region's GRDP.

==== Mindanao (outside the ARMM) ====
In 2012, the unemployment rate went down to 4.6 percent after it being 5.0 percent in 2010. This translated to 48 thousand new jobs and was well above the target of 45 to 50 thousand new jobs per year. The underemployment rate eased to 26.2 percent in 2012 from 28 percent in 2010, but is still much higher than the end-of-plan target of 20 percent.

Employment in the region has increased by 2.79 percent between 2010 and 2012, a bit higher than the national average of 2.16 percent. Its contribution to the national growth rate is about 0.14 percent, the eighth highest among the 17 regions. Over the same period, wage and salary workers increased by 4.92 percent. However, there remains a large proportion of the employed sector who are unpaid family, and part-time workers. The high underemployment rate of the region may partly imply a high incidence of workers in the informal sector, including those in rural and/or agricultural areas.

The region posted the second highest average annual family income in Mindanao in 2009, although lower than the national average. Between 2006 and 2009, annual family income increased by 16.2 percent from PHP 142,000 to PHP 165,000. On the average, incomes rose by 5.4 percent annually exceeding the region‟s RDP target of five percent. The average annual family savings in the region also increased but at a slower pace of four percent from PHP 25,000 in 2006 to PHP 26,000 in 2009. The said rate of increase however, is below the region‟s savings target of two percent.

==== ARMM ====
The ARMM has the lowest income among all the regions because it has a scarcity of good roads and good transportation, as well as logistical difficulties. Another reason behind the low average income of the ARMM is the ongoing Islamic Insurgency, which displaces a lot of families, which causes the government problems in implementing policies that help alleviate poverty.

However, the main reason why the ARMM earns very little despite its autonomy is that 93–94% of its funds are still derived from the National Government through the internal revenue allotment or IRA. As a result, it is very dependent on the central government. This allotment or grant of national taxes is given to every local government unit because it is mandated by Article X, Section 6, of the 1987 Philippine Constitution.

==== NCR ====
The National Capital Region, or NCR, on the other hand, has the highest income of all the regions mainly because it is the economic, sociocultural and political center of the country. Economically, this can be seen in Makati and Ortigas, which are the central business districts of the region. This region is also the seat of the Philippine government, even though Manila is designated as the official capital.

Another main reason why the NCR has the highest income because more than 50% of its income is generated from local taxation and other sources of revenue while the rest comes from the Internal Revenue Grant. Also, the NCR allocates 12–13% of its income to education, and has a high amount of savings, thus ensuring its independence from the national government. However, the NCR is the highest borrower among all the regions, thus it also has the highest debt at the same time.

==== Compared to other countries ====
Out of 149 countries, the Philippines ranked approximately 60th in terms of wealth inequality; it neighbors such countries as Indonesia and Micronesia. Ukraine and Iceland topped the list as the world's most equal country, whereas South Africa was on the opposite side of the list.

== Connection with corruption ==
A main cause of income inequality in the Philippines is its political culture. It is a spoils system which is based on relationships between leaders of political parties to other politicians and local elites. Thus, this patron-client system has created a system where a small number of powerful and wealthy families are in control of the political system. Due to this, powerful politicians are able to fill appointive government positions with their allies and also preventing more deserving individuals without connections from being able to serve, thus denying equal opportunities in the government.

There have been many examples in past history of the corruption that is taking place here. For example, in 2017 the government in the Philippines began an investigation into an allegation of misuse of tobacco tax funds in Ilocos Norte from 2010 to 2016.

This patron-client system, which causes rampant graft and corruption, maintains a society that discriminates against the poor in favor of connected individuals and businesses, as seen in a biased system of taxation where the well-connected benefit. Also, social spending for the marginalized is reduced because the money goes to those with connections and government projects go to the well-connected. Thus, the government cannot distribute resources equitably.

== Connection with education ==
One of the main causes of income inequality in the Philippines can be traced to educational inequality. According to a study conducted by José De Gregorio, income inequality increases with educational inequality. Based on the Philippines' 2010 Census of Population and Housing, there is an inequality in the highest level of educational attainment between both males and females aged 5 years old and over.

=== Out-of-school youth ===
Based on the 2013 Functional Literacy, Education and Mass Media Survey, which had a sample size of 36 million Filipinos aged 6 to 24, 19.2 percent of those respondents cited "insufficient family income" as their top reason for not attending school.

== Taxation and income inequality ==
=== Consumption and other indirect taxes ===
A contributing factor to income inequality in the Philippines is the taxation system for it focuses on consumption taxes which are based on how much a person consumes or purchases, regardless of income. Since the low-income classes have to spend more to meet their day-to day needs, then they end up paying more on consumption taxes, unlike the high-income classes, who are able to save money after meeting their needs.

Indirect taxes, not just VAT, are inherently regressive because they hurt the poor more than they do the rich. This is because taxpayers, like property owners and businessmen, can simply pass on these taxes to the ordinary folk, thus they experience a loss of income and the raising of prices of goods and services. This happens because these taxpayers can add the taxes they have to pay to the prices of their goods, thus handing the burden over to the consumer.

=== Income tax ===
However, income tax also becomes a factor to income inequality because according to the Tax Management Association of the Philippines, Filipino workers pay the highest income tax in the entire Association of South-East Asian Nations (ASEAN) region. An average Filipino worker is taxed 32% as long as he is earning more than the minimum wage. These minimum wage earners are the only ones who are tax-exempt. Corporations are taxed less than individual earners at a tax rate of 30%.

== See also ==
- Economic inequality
- Poverty in the Philippines
- List of Philippine provinces by Human Development Index
