= Samata Party (disambiguation) =

Samata Party (lit. 'Equality Party') may refer to:

- Samata Party, a political party in India
- Rashtriya Lok Samata Party, a political party in India
- Samata Samaj Party, a political party in India
- Samata Kranti Dal, a political party in India
- Jai Bharat Samanta Party, a political party in India

== See also ==
- Equality Party (disambiguation)
