= Delay equalization =

Signal processing technique

In signal processing, delay equalization corresponds to adjusting the relative phases of different frequencies to achieve a constant group delay, using by adding an all-pass filter in series with an uncompensated filter. Clever machine-learning techniques are now being applied to the design of such filters.
