= List of countries by income inequality =

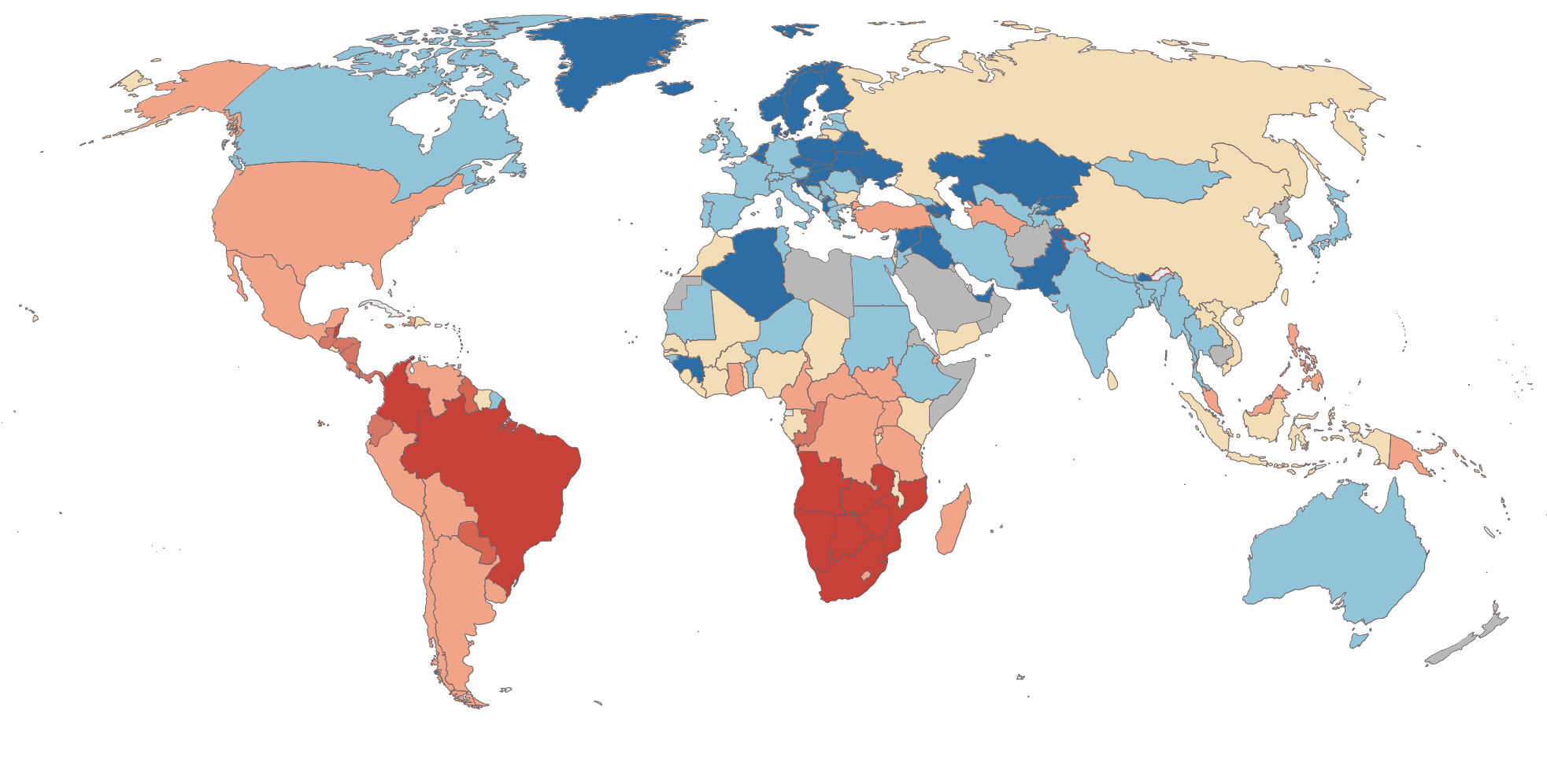
Global map of countries by Gini coefficient of income according to the World Bank, Poverty and Inequality Platform (2022).: No data; <30; 30-35; 35-40; 40-45; 45-50; 50+

This is a list of countries and territories by income inequality metrics, as calculated by the World Bank, UNU-WIDER, OECD, and World Inequality Database, based on different indicators, like the Gini coefficient and specific income ratios. Income from black market economic activity is not included.

The Gini coefficient is a number between 0 and 100, where 0 represents perfect equality (everyone has the same income). Meanwhile, an index of 100 implies perfect inequality (one person has all the income, and everyone else has no income).

Income ratios include the pre-tax national income share held by the top 10% of the population and the ratio of the upper bound value of the ninth decile (i.e., the 10% of people with the highest income) to that of the upper bound value of the first decile (the ratio of the average income of the richest 10% to the poorest 10%).

Income distribution can vary greatly from wealth distribution in a country.

== Gini coefficient ==
=== All countries ===
Country/Territory	UN Region	World Bank Income group (2024)	Gini coefficient (Note: The Gini coefficient, or Gini index, measures the extent to which the distribution of income (or, in some cases, consumption expenditure) among individuals or households within an economy deviates from a perfectly equal distribution. A Lorenz curve plots the cumulative percentages of total income received against the cumulative number of recipients, starting with the poorest individual or household. The Gini index measures the area between the Lorenz curve and a hypothetical line of absolute equality, expressed as a percentage of the maximum area under the line. Thus, a Gini index of 0 represents perfect equality, while an index of 100 implies perfect inequality.)					
Country/Territory	UN Region	World Bank Income group (2024)	WB	Year	UNU- WIDER	Year	OECD	Year
Afghanistan	Southern Asia	Low income			31.00	2017		
Albania	Southern Europe	Upper middle income	29.4	2020	29.42	2020		
Algeria	Northern Africa	Upper middle income	27.6	2011	27.62	2012		
Andorra	Southern Europe	High income			27.96	2016		
Angola	Middle Africa	Lower middle income	51.3	2018	51.27	2019		
Argentina	South America	Upper middle income	42.4	2024	37.80	2022		
Armenia	Western Asia	Upper middle income	27.2	2023	27.94	2021		
Australia	Australia and New Zealand	High income	33.8	2020	34.33	2018		
Austria	Western Europe	High income	31.2	2023	30.70	2022	28.5	2022
Azerbaijan	Western Asia	Upper middle income	26.6	2005	26.55	2005		
Bahamas	Caribbean	High income			41.40	2013		
Bahrain	Western Asia	High income			59.60	2015		
Bangladesh	Southern Asia	Lower middle income	30.9	2022	32.39	2016		
Barbados	Caribbean	High income	34.1	2016	32.00	2017		
Belarus	Eastern Europe	Upper middle income	24.4	2020	24.38	2020		
Belgium	Western Europe	High income	26.8	2023	26.70	2022	25.0	2022
Belize	Central America	Upper middle income	39.9	2018	53.26	1999		
Benin	Western Africa	Lower middle income	34.4	2021	37.95	2019		
Bhutan	Southern Asia	Lower middle income	28.5	2022	28.46	2022		
Bolivia	South America	Lower middle income	40.9	2024	40.91	2021		
Bosnia and Herzegovina	Southern Europe	Upper middle income	30.3	2021	33.03	2011		
Botswana	Southern Africa	Upper middle income	54.9	2015	53.33	2016		
Brazil	South America	Upper middle income	50.3	2024	51.40	2022		
Brunei	South-eastern Asia	High income			56.40	1981		
Burkina Faso	Western Africa	Low income	37.4	2021	43.02	2019		
Burundi	Eastern Africa	Low income	37.5	2020	38.62	2014		
Bulgaria	Eastern Europe	High income	39.5	2023	39.01	2022		
Cambodia	South-eastern Asia	Lower middle income			30.76	2012		
Cameroon	Middle Africa	Lower middle income	42.2	2021	46.64	2014		
Canada	Northern America	High income	31.5	2022	28.80	2021	30.6	2023
Cape Verde	Western Africa	Lower middle income	42.4	2015	42.38	2015		
Central African Republic	Middle Africa	Low income	43.0	2021	43.05	2021		
Chad	Middle Africa	Low income	37.4	2022	37.50	2019		
Chile	South America	High income	43.0	2022	44.50	2022	44.8	2022
China	Eastern Asia	Upper middle income	36.0	2022	36.67	2020		
Colombia	South America	Upper middle income	54.4	2024	52.90	2021		
Comoros	Eastern Africa	Lower middle income	30.3	2024	45.33	2014		
Democratic Republic of the Congo	Middle Africa	Low income	44.7	2020				
Republic of the Congo	Middle Africa	Lower middle income	48.9	2011	48.94	2012		
Costa Rica	Central America	Upper middle income	45.5	2025	47.15	2022	47.0	2023
Croatia	Southern Europe	High income	30.1	2023	28.92	2022		
Cuba	Caribbean	Upper middle income			38.00	2000		
Cyprus	Western Asia	High income	31.8	2023	31.25	2022		
Czech Republic	Eastern Europe	High income	25.7	2023	26.24	2022	24.9	2022
Denmark	Northern Europe	High income	29.9	2023	28.47	2022		
Djibouti	Eastern Africa	Lower middle income	41.6	2017	41.59	2017		
Dominican Republic	Caribbean	Upper middle income	39.0	2024	38.10	2022		
Ecuador	South America	Upper middle income	45.9	2025	45.47	2022		
Egypt	Northern Africa	Lower middle income	28.5	2021	31.89	2020		
El Salvador	Central America	Upper middle income	39.8	2023	38.76	2022		
Estonia	Northern Europe	High income	30.7	2023	31.95	2022	32.1	2021
Eswatini	Southern Africa	Lower middle income	54.6	2016	54.58	2017		
Ethiopia	Eastern Africa	NA	31.1	2021	34.99	2016		
Fiji	Melanesia	Upper middle income	30.7	2019	30.71	2020		
Finland	Northern Europe	High income	27.4	2023	28.71	2022	26.9	2023
France	Western Europe	High income	31.8	2023	31.63	2022	29.7	2022
Gabon	Middle Africa	Upper middle income	38.0	2017	38.02	2017		
Gambia	Western Africa	Low income	38.8	2020	38.76	2021		
Georgia	Western Asia	Upper middle income	33.9	2024	36.93	2021		
Germany	Western Europe	High income	33.7	2022	30.64	2022		
Ghana	Western Africa	Lower middle income	43.5	2016	43.52	2017		
Greece	Southern Europe	High income	33.4	2022	33.25	2022	31.6	2022
Greenland	Northern America	High income			35.40	2018		
Grenada	Caribbean	Upper middle income	43.8	2018	36.60	2008		
Equatorial Guinea	Middle Africa	Upper middle income	38.5	2022	50.20	2006		
Guinea	Western Africa	Lower middle income	29.6	2018	29.59	2019		
Guinea-Bissau	Western Africa	Low income	33.4	2021	34.77	2019		
Guatemala	Central America	Upper middle income	45.2	2023	48.28	2014		
Guyana	South America	High income	45.1	1998	35.00	2006		
Haiti	Caribbean	Lower middle income	41.1	2012	41.10	2012		
Honduras	Central America	Lower middle income	45.7	2024	48.10	2021		
Hong Kong	Eastern Asia	High income			42.00	2016		
Hungary	Eastern Europe	High income	30.6	2017	29.32	2022	29.4	2022
Iceland	Northern Europe	High income	26.8	2019	26.27	2018		
India	Southern Asia	Lower middle income	25.5	2022	37.06	2022		
Indonesia	South-eastern Asia	Upper middle income	34.4	2025	37.92	2022		
Iran	Southern Asia	Upper middle income	35.9	2023	40.94	2020		
Iraq	Western Asia	Upper middle income	29.8	2023	47.20	2013		
Ireland	Northern Europe	High income	29.0	2023	30.29	2022	28.5	2022
Israel	Western Asia	High income	37.9	2021	34.00	2020	34.5	2022
Italy	Southern Europe	High income	34.3	2023	34.92	2022	31.9	2022
Ivory Coast	Western Africa	Lower middle income	35.3	2021	37.17	2019		
Jamaica	Caribbean	Upper middle income	39.9	2021	37.48	2017		
Japan	Eastern Asia	High income	32.9	2013	33.40	2018	33.8	2021
Jordan	Western Asia	Lower middle income	33.7	2010	33.58	2014		
Kazakhstan	Central Asia	Upper middle income	29.2	2021	27.79	2018		
Kenya	Eastern Africa	Lower middle income	38.5	2022	38.70	2021		
Kiribati	Micronesia	Lower middle income	24.7	2023	27.83	2020		
Kosovo	Southern Europe	Upper middle income	38.3	2022	29.01	2017		
Kuwait	Western Asia	High income			36.02	2000		
Kyrgyzstan	Central Asia	Lower middle income	27.5	2024	28.99	2020		
Laos	South-eastern Asia	Lower middle income	34.7	2024	38.80	2019		
Latvia	Northern Europe	High income	34.0	2023	34.56	2022	34.0	2022
Lebanon	Western Asia	Lower middle income	35.5	2022	31.83	2012		
Lesotho	Southern Africa	Lower middle income	44.9	2017	44.88	2018		
Liberia	Western Africa	Low income	35.3	2016	35.27	2016		
Libya	Northern Africa	Upper middle income			30.20	2008		
Lithuania	Northern Europe	High income	36.0	2023	36.68	2022	36.0	2022
Luxembourg	Western Europe	High income	33.6	2023	32.91	2022	29.6	2022
Madagascar	Eastern Africa	Low income	36.8	2021	42.65	2013		
Malawi	Eastern Africa	Low income	38.5	2019	38.54	2020		
Malaysia	South-eastern Asia	Upper middle income	40.7	2021				
Maldives	Southern Asia	Upper middle income	29.3	2019	29.29	2020		
Mali	Western Africa	Low income	35.7	2021	35.28	2021		
Malta	Southern Europe	High income	31.8	2023	31.64	2022		
Marshall Islands	Micronesia	Upper middle income	35.5	2019	35.48	2020		
Mauritania	Western Africa	Lower middle income	32.0	2019	32.62	2014		
Mauritius	Eastern Africa	Upper middle income	36.8	2017	38.47	2012		
Mexico	Central America	Upper middle income	42.6	2024	44.01	2022	40.0	2022
Federated States of Micronesia	Micronesia	Lower middle income	40.1	2013	40.06	2013		
Moldova	Eastern Europe	Upper middle income	26.8	2023	25.73	2021		
Mongolia	Eastern Asia	Upper middle income	31.4	2022	32.74	2018		
Montenegro	Southern Europe	Upper middle income	34.3	2021	32.90	2020		
Morocco	Northern Africa	Lower middle income	39.5	2013	39.55	2014		
Mozambique	Eastern Africa	Low income	49.6	2022	50.45	2020		
Myanmar	South-eastern Asia	Lower middle income	30.7	2017	30.70	2017		
North Macedonia	Southern Europe	Upper middle income	33.5	2019	33.51	2020		
Namibia	Southern Africa	Upper middle income	59.1	2015	59.07	2016		
Nauru	Micronesia	High income	32.4	2012	32.36	2013		
Netherlands	Western Europe	High income	25.7	2021	26.04	2022	28.8	2022
Nepal	Southern Asia	Lower middle income	30.0	2022	32.84	2011		
New Zealand	Australia and New Zealand	High income			32.00	2020		
Niger	Western Africa	Low income	32.9	2021	37.26	2019		
Nigeria	Western Africa	Lower middle income	33.9	2022	35.13	2019		
Nicaragua	Central America	Lower middle income	46.2	2014	46.16	2014		
Norway	Northern Europe	High income	26.5	2023	29.48	2021	26.2	2022
Oman	Western Asia	High income			30.09	2019		
Pakistan	Southern Asia	Lower middle income	33.5	2024	29.59	2019		
Palau	Micronesia	High income			43.00	2014		
Palestine	Western Asia	Lower middle income	33.7	2016	33.69	2017		
Panama	Central America	High income	49.7	2024	49.60	2022		
Papua New Guinea	Melanesia	Lower middle income	41.9	2009	41.85	2010		
Paraguay	South America	Upper middle income	44.2	2024	45.11	2022		
Peru	South America	Upper middle income	40.1	2024	40.25	2021		
Philippines	South-eastern Asia	Lower middle income	39.3	2023	40.68	2021		
Poland	Eastern Europe	High income	28.5	2023	28.56	2022	27.0	2022
Portugal	Southern Europe	High income	33.9	2023	34.59	2022	33.2	2022
Puerto Rico	Caribbean	High income			55.80	2003		
Qatar	Western Asia	High income	35.1	2017	24.60	2013		
Réunion	Eastern Africa	—			51.00	1977		
Romania	Eastern Europe	High income	29.8	2023	34.10	2022		
Russia	Eastern Europe	High income	33.0	2023	36.03	2020		
Rwanda	Eastern Africa	Low income	39.4	2023	43.71	2017		
Saint Kitts and Nevis	Caribbean	High income			40.00	2009		
Saint Lucia	Caribbean	Upper middle income	43.7	2015	51.23	2016		
Saint Vincent and the Grenadines	Caribbean	Upper middle income			40.00	2008		
Samoa	Polynesia	Upper middle income	38.7	2013	38.73	2014		
San Marino	Southern Europe	High income			27.70	2017		
São Tomé and Príncipe	Middle Africa	Lower middle income	40.7	2017	40.75	2017		
Saudi Arabia	Western Asia	High income			42.20	2018		
Senegal	Western Africa	Lower middle income	36.2	2021	38.31	2019		
Serbia	Southern Europe	Upper middle income	32.8	2023	34.98	2021		
Seychelles	Eastern Africa	High income	32.1	2018	32.13	2019		
Singapore	South-eastern Asia	High income			47.30	2011		
Sierra Leone	Western Africa	Low income	35.7	2018	35.69	2018		
Slovakia	Eastern Europe	High income	23.8	2023	24.12	2022	22.6	2022
Slovenia	Southern Europe	High income	24.7	2023	24.28	2022	24.4	2022
Solomon Islands	Melanesia	Lower middle income	37.1	2012	37.05	2013		
Somalia	Eastern Africa	Low income			36.30	2016		
South Africa	Southern Africa	Upper middle income	54.1	2022	66.99	2017		
South Korea	Eastern Asia	High income	32.9	2021	33.10	2020	32.4	2022
South Sudan	Eastern Africa	Low income	44.0	2016	44.14	2017		
Spain	Southern Europe	High income	33.4	2023	33.99	2022	32.0	2021
Sri Lanka	Southern Asia	Lower middle income	37.7	2019	37.66	2019		
Sudan	Northern Africa	Low income	34.2	2014	34.24	2014		
Suriname	South America	Upper middle income	39.2	2022	38.10	2017		
Sweden	Northern Europe	High income	29.3	2023	30.08	2022	28.9	2023
Switzerland	Western Europe	High income	33.8	2022	33.82	2021		
Syria	Western Asia	Low income	26.4	2022	34.20	2007		
Taiwan	Eastern Asia	High income			32.58	2021		
Tajikistan	Central Asia	Lower middle income	36.1	2024	34.00	2015		
Tanzania	Eastern Africa	Lower middle income	40.5	2018	40.49	2018		
Thailand	South-eastern Asia	Upper middle income	33.3	2024	35.12	2021		
Timor-Leste	South-eastern Asia	Lower middle income	28.7	2014	28.65	2014		
Togo	Western Africa	Low income	37.9	2021				
Tonga	Polynesia	Upper middle income	27.1	2021	33.52	2015		
Trinidad and Tobago	Caribbean	High income	40.2	1992	40.27	1992		
Tunisia	Northern Africa	Lower middle income	33.7	2021	32.82	2016		
Turkey	—	Upper middle income	43.7	2023	42.60	2021	42.7	2022
Turkmenistan	Central Asia	Upper middle income	40.8	1998	40.81	1998		
Turks and Caicos Islands	Caribbean	High income			37.00	1999		
Tuvalu	Polynesia	Upper middle income	39.1	2010	39.14	2010		
Uganda	Eastern Africa	Low income	42.7	2019	42.71	2020		
Ukraine	Eastern Europe	Upper middle income	25.6	2020	25.63	2020		
Uruguay	South America	High income	40.9	2023				
United Arab Emirates	Western Asia	High income	26.4	2018	25.97	2019		
United Kingdom	Northern Europe	High income	32.4	2021	34.24	2022	35.4	2021
United States	Northern America	High income	41.8	2024	39.79	2022	39.6	2022
Uzbekistan	Central Asia	Lower middle income	32.7	2025	35.27	2003		
Venezuela	South America	NA	44.7	2006	37.80	2014		
Vietnam	South-eastern Asia	Lower middle income	36.1	2022	36.81	2020		
Vanuatu	Melanesia	Lower middle income	32.3	2019	32.32	2020		
Yemen	Western Asia	Low income	36.7	2014	36.71	2014		
Zambia	Eastern Africa	Lower middle income	51.5	2022	44.00	2022		
Zimbabwe	Eastern Africa	Lower middle income	50.3	2019	50.26	2019		

=== EU countries ===
   

Member state	Gini coefficient												
Member state	2011	2012	2013	2014	2015	2016	2017	2018	2019	2020	2021	2022	2023
Austria	27.4	27.6	27.0	27.6	27.2	27.2	27.9	26.8	27.5	27.0	26.7	27.8	28.1
Belgium	26.3	26.5	25.9	25.9	26.2	26.3	26.1	25.7	25.1	25.4	24.1	24.9	24.2
Bulgaria	35.0	33.6	35.4	35.4	37.0	37.7	40.2	39.6	40.8	40.0	39.7	38.4	37.2
Croatia	31.2	30.9	30.9	30.2	30.4	29.8	29.9	29.7	29.2	28.3	29.2	28.5	29.7
Cyprus	29.2	31.0	32.4	34.8	33.6	32.1	30.8	29.1	31.1	29.3	29.4	29.4	29.6
Czech Republic	25.2	24.9	24.6	25.1	25.0	25.1	24.5	24.0	24.0	24.2	24.9	24.8	24.4
Denmark	26.6	26.5	26.8	27.7	27.4	27.7	27.6	27.8	27.5	27.3	27.0	27.7	28.2
Estonia	31.9	32.5	32.9	35.6	34.8	32.7	31.6	30.6	30.5	30.5	30.6	31.9	31.8
Finland	25.8	25.9	25.4	25.6	25.2	25.4	25.3	25.9	26.2	26.5	25.7	26.6	26.6
France	30.8	30.5	30.1	29.2	29.2	29.3	28.8	28.5	29.2	29.2	29.3	29.8	29.7
Germany	29.0	28.3	29.7	30.7	30.1	29.5	29.1	31.1	29.7	30.5	31.2	29.0	29.4
Greece	33.5	34.3	34.4	34.5	34.2	34.3	33.4	32.3	31.0	31.4	32.4	31.4	31.8
Hungary	26.9	27.2	28.3	28.6	28.2	28.2	28.1	28.7	28.0	28.0	27.6	27.4	29.0
Ireland	29.8	30.4	30.7	31.1	29.7	29.6	30.6	28.9	28.3	28.3	26.6	26.9	27.4
Italy	32.5	32.4	32.8	32.4	32.4	33.1	32.7	33.4	32.8	32.5	32.9	32.7	31.5
Latvia	35.1	35.7	35.2	35.5	35.4	34.5	34.5	35.6	35.2	34.5	35.7	34.3	34.0
Lithuania	33.0	32.0	34.6	35.0	37.9	37.0	37.6	36.9	35.4	35.1	35.4	36.2	35.7
Luxembourg	27.2	28.0	30.4	28.7	28.5	29.6	29.2	31.3	32.3	31.2	29.6	29.1	30.6
Malta	27.2	27.1	28.0	27.7	28.1	28.6	28.2	28.7	28.0	30.3	31.2	31.1	33.0
Netherlands	25.8	25.4	25.1	26.2	26.7	26.9	27.1	27.4	26.8	28.2	26.4	26.3	26.4
Poland	31.1	30.9	30.7	30.8	30.6	29.8	29.2	27.8	28.5	27.2	26.8	26.3	27.0
Portugal	34.2	34.5	34.2	34.5	34.0	33.9	33.5	32.1	31.9	31.2	33.0	32.0	33.7
Romania	33.5	34.0	34.6	35.0	37.4	34.7	33.1	35.1	34.8	33.8	34.3	32.0	31.0
Slovakia	25.7	25.3	24.2	26.1	23.7	24.3	23.2	20.9	22.8	20.9	21.8	21.2	21.6
Slovenia	23.8	23.7	24.4	25.0	24.5	24.4	23.7	23.4	23.9	23.5	23.0	23.1	23.4
Spain	34.0	34.2	33.7	34.7	34.6	34.5	34.1	33.2	33.0	32.1	33.0	32.0	31.5
Sweden	26.0	26.0	26.0	26.9	26.7	27.6	28.0	27.0	27.6	26.9	26.8	27.6	29.5
European Union	30.5	30.4	30.6	30.9	30.8	30.6	30.3	30.4	30.2	30.0	30.2	29.6	29.6
(European Union) Eurozone	30.6	30.5	30.7	31.0	30.7	30.7	30.4	30.6	30.2	30.3	30.5	—	—
Serbia (Note: Serbia is a negotiating candidate for the EU.)	—	—	38.0	38.3	40.0	39.8	37.8	35.6	33.3	33.3	33.3	33.2	—
Montenegro (Note: Montenegro is a negotiating candidate for the EU.)	—	—	38.5	36.5	36.5	36.5	36.7	34.7	34.1	32.9	32.5	31.5	—
Notes: Pink-colored cells indicate a break in the time series. Green-colored cells indicate estimated values.

=== OECD countries ===
Country	Gini coefficient		
Country	Before taxes and transfers	After taxes and transfers	Year
Australia	0.441	0.318	2020
Austria	0.486	0.274	2019
Belgium	0.489	0.262	2019
Canada	0.438	0.280	2020
Chile	0.495	0.460	2017
Costa Rica	0.551	0.487	2021
Czech Republic	0.432	0.248	2019
Denmark	0.445	0.268	2019
Estonia	0.465	0.305	2019
Finland	0.516	0.265	2020
France	0.519	0.292	2019
Germany	0.505	0.309	2022
Greece	0.525	0.308	2019
Hungary	0.463	0.286	2019
Iceland	0.369	0.250	2017
Ireland	0.520	0.292	2018
Israel	0.449	0.342	2019
Italy	0.511	0.330	2018
Japan	0.570	0.381	2021
Latvia	0.483	0.355	2020
Lithuania	0.495	0.357	2019
Luxembourg	0.490	0.305	2019
Mexico	0.435	0.420	2020
Netherlands	0.453	0.304	2020
New Zealand	0.454	0.320	2020
Norway	0.436	0.263	2020
Poland	0.452	0.281	2018
Portugal	0.511	0.310	2019
Slovakia	0.383	0.222	2019
Slovenia	0.444	0.246	2019
South Korea	0.405	0.331	2020
Spain	0.491	0.320	2019
Sweden	0.433	0.276	2020
Switzerland	0.402	0.316	2019
Turkey	0.502	0.415	2019
United Kingdom	0.507	0.355	2020
United States	0.517	0.375	2021

== Different income ratios ==
List of countries by income inequality based on Pre-tax national income share held by the top 10% of the population, Income Decile 1 and Interdecile P90/P10

Country/Territory	UN Region	World Bank Income group (2024)	Pre-tax national income Top 10% share (Note: Pre-tax national income share held by the top 10% of the population (WID): Pre-tax national income is the sum of all pre-tax personal income flows accruing to the owners of the production factors, labor, and capital before taking into account the operation of the tax/transfer system, but after taking into account the operation of the pension system. The central difference between personal factor income and pre-tax income is the treatment of pensions, which are counted on a contribution basis by factor income and on a distribution basis by pre-tax income. The population is composed of individuals over the age of 20. The base unit is the tax unit defined by national fiscal administrations to measure personal income taxes.)		Income Decile 1 (Note: Decile 1 group shares of resource (UNU-WIDER, PIP): A decile is a quantitative method of dividing data into 10 equal parts. Income Decile 1 measures the percentage share of income of the bottom (poorest) 10% of the population.)				Interdecile P90/P10 (Note: Interdecile P90/P10 (OECD): The P90/P10 ratio is the ratio of the upper bound value of the ninth decile (i.e., the 10% of people with the highest income) to that of the upper bound value of the first decile, after taxes and adjusted for household size.)	
Country/Territory	UN Region	World Bank Income group (2024)	World Inequality Database	Year	UNU- WIDER	Year	Poverty and Inequality Platform	Year	OECD	Year
Afghanistan	Southern Asia	Low income	41.94%	2022						
Angola	Middle Africa	Lower middle income	58.01%	2022	1.33	2019	1.335	2018		
Albania	Southern Europe	Upper middle income	32.14%	2022	3.41	2020	3.418	2020		
Andorra	Southern Europe	High income	34.84%	2022	4.30	2016				
United Arab Emirates	Western Asia	High income	47.78%	2022	3.98	2019	2.835	2018		
Argentina	South America	Upper middle income	43.91%	2022	1.83	2021	2.008	2022		
Armenia	Western Asia	Upper middle income	46.77%	2022	3.97	2021	3.904	2022		
Australia	Australia and New Zealand	High income	32.91%	2022	2.68	2018	2.765	2018	4.3	2020
Austria	Western Europe	High income	34.19%	2022	1.89	2022	2.765	2021	3.5	2021
Azerbaijan	Western Asia	Upper middle income	42.87%	2022	6.14	2018	4.848	2005		
Burundi	Eastern Africa	Low income	48.39%	2022	2.76	2014	2.876	2020		
Belgium	Western Europe	High income	29.54%	2022	2.26	2022	3.645	2021	3.1	2021
Benin	Western Africa	Lower middle income	46.94%	2022	2.88	2019	3.108	2021		
Burkina Faso	Western Africa	Low income	54.84%	2022	2.62	2019	3.029	2021		
Bangladesh	Southern Asia	Lower middle income	36.52%	2022	3.63	2022	3.467	2022		
Bulgaria	Eastern Europe	High income	44.18%	2022	1.58	2022	2.007	2021	5.8	2021
Bahrain	Western Asia	High income	55.72%	2022						
Bahamas	Caribbean	High income	52.41%	2022	2.20	2013				
Bosnia and Herzegovina	Southern Europe	Upper middle income	34.25%	2022	2.94	2011	2.936	2011		
Belarus	Eastern Europe	Upper middle income	29.92%	2022	4.45	2020	4.454	2020		
Belize	Central America	Upper middle income	52.41%	2022	0.93	1999	0.950	1999		
Bolivia	South America	Lower middle income	52.41%	2022	1.77	2021	1.775	2021		
Brazil	South America	Upper middle income	56.78%	2022	1.02	2021	1.196	2022	8.4	2022
Barbados	Caribbean	High income	48.52%	2022	1.40	2010				
Brunei	South-eastern Asia	High income	36.40%	2022	0.80	1981				
Bhutan	Southern Asia	Lower middle income	49.19%	2022	3.63	2022	3.633	2022		
Botswana	Southern Africa	Upper middle income	59.26%	2022	1.53	2016	1.532	2015		
Central African Republic	Middle Africa	Low income	64.91%	2022	2.13	2021	2.143	2021		
Canada	Northern America	High income	35.18%	2022	3.30	2020	2.973	2019	3.7	2021
Switzerland	Western Europe	High income	31.64%	2022	2.50	2021	2.950	2020	3.8	2020
Chile	South America	High income	58.95%	2022	2.06	2020	2.268	2022	7.3	2022
China	Eastern Asia	Upper middle income	43.35%	2022	2.92	2020	3.039	2021	23.0	2011
Ivory Coast	Western Africa	Lower middle income	54.66%	2022	2.90	2019	3.150	2021		
Cameroon	Middle Africa	Lower middle income	52.05%	2022	1.72	2014	2.127	2021		
Democratic Republic of the Congo	Middle Africa	Low income	48.84%	2022	2.09	2013	2.128	2020		
Republic of the Congo	Middle Africa	Lower middle income	55.93%	2022	1.56	2012	1.562	2011		
Colombia	South America	Upper middle income	60.62%	2022	1.17	2021	1.033	2022		
Comoros	Eastern Africa	Lower middle income	50.26%	2022	1.61	2014	1.617	2014		
Cape Verde	Western Africa	Lower middle income	49.08%	2022	2.22	2015	2.219	2015		
Costa Rica	Central America	Upper middle income	57.50%	2022	1.66	2022	1.639	2023	9.7	2023
Cuba	Caribbean	Upper middle income	45.29%	2022	3.40	1978				
Cyprus	Western Asia	High income	33.45%	2022	2.46	2022	3.547	2021		
Czech Republic	Eastern Europe	High income	29.66%	2022	2.58	2022	3.893	2021	3.1	2021
Germany	Western Europe	High income	34.04%	2022	1.82	2022	2.940	2020	3.9	2020
Djibouti	Eastern Africa	Lower middle income	49.55%	2022	1.94	2017	1.944	2017		
Denmark	Northern Europe	High income	40.57%	2022	1.99	2022	3.695	2021	3.0	2019
Dominican Republic	Caribbean	Upper middle income	47.77%	2022	2.56	2021	2.610	2022		
Algeria	Northern Africa	Upper middle income	38.08%	2022	4.05	2012	4.046	2011		
Ecuador	South America	Upper middle income	44.83%	2022	1.66	2022	1.640	2023		
Egypt	Northern Africa	Lower middle income	47.60%	2022	3.84	2020	3.841	2019		
Spain	Southern Europe	High income	33.13%	2022	1.73	2022	2.211	2021	4.6	2021
Estonia	Northern Europe	High income	38.16%	2022	1.67	2022	3.093	2021	5.0	2021
Ethiopia	Eastern Africa	NA	45.47%	2022	2.89	2016	2.889	2015		
Finland	Northern Europe	High income	31.64%	2022	2.18	2022	3.840	2021	3.2	2022
Fiji	Melanesia	Upper middle income	48.59%	2022	3.47	2020	3.468	2019		
France	Western Europe	High income	34.79%	2022	2.16	2022	2.933	2021	3.5	2021
Federated States of Micronesia	Micronesia	Lower middle income	48.59%	2022	1.87	2013	1.874	2013		
Gabon	Middle Africa	Upper middle income	43.32%	2022	2.24	2017	2.241	2017		
United Kingdom	Northern Europe	High income	33.70%	2022	2.27	2021	3.041	2021	4.3	2021
Georgia	Western Asia	Upper middle income	45.03%	2022	2.65	2021	2.638	2022		
Ghana	Western Africa	Lower middle income	48.91%	2022	1.61	2017	1.611	2016		
Guinea	Western Africa	Lower middle income	37.89%	2022	3.48	2019	3.478	2018		
Gambia	Western Africa	Low income	45.87%	2022	2.59	2021	2.594	2020		
Guinea-Bissau	Western Africa	Low income	44.09%	2022	3.31	2019	3.393	2021		
Equatorial Guinea	Middle Africa	Upper middle income	51.39%	2022						
Greece	Southern Europe	High income	35.00%	2022	1.94	2022	2.610	2021	4.0	2021
Grenada	Caribbean	Upper middle income	48.52%	2022	2.88	2008	2.128	2018		
Greenland	Northern America	High income	48.59%	2022	2.10	2018				
Guatemala	Central America	Upper middle income	52.41%	2022	1.67	2014	1.672	2014		
Guyana	South America	High income	52.41%	2022	1.09	1998	1.158	1998		
Hong Kong	Eastern Asia	High income	48.18%	2022	0.70	2016				
Honduras	Central America	Lower middle income	52.41%	2022	1.24	2019	1.243	2019		
Croatia	Southern Europe	High income	32.04%	2022	1.40	2022	3.110	2021	4.0	2021
Haiti	Caribbean	Lower middle income	52.41%	2022	2.10	2012	0.765	2012		
Hungary	Eastern Europe	High income	33.50%	2022	1.83	2022	3.518	2021	3.1	2021
Indonesia	South-eastern Asia	Upper middle income	41.24%	2022	2.80	2022	3.328	2023		
India	Southern Asia	Lower middle income	57.13%	2022	2.90	2022	2.898	2021	9.4	2011
Ireland	Northern Europe	High income	40.86%	2022	1.77	2022	3.633	2021	3.6	2021
Iran	Southern Asia	Upper middle income	52.39%	2022	2.31	2020	2.831	2022		
Iraq	Western Asia	Upper middle income	50.67%	2022	1.28	2013	3.680	2012		
Iceland	Northern Europe	High income	29.51%	2022	4.03	2018	4.033	2017	2.8	2017
Israel	Western Asia	High income	47.80%	2022	1.87	2018	2.000	2021	5.4	2021
Italy	Southern Europe	High income	39.05%	2022	1.54	2022	2.303	2021	4.4	2021
Jamaica	Caribbean	Upper middle income	52.41%	2022	2.61	2015	2.176	2021		
Jordan	Western Asia	Lower middle income	48.36%	2022	3.16	2014	3.455	2010		
Japan	Eastern Asia	High income	44.24%	2022	1.85	2014	2.993	2013	5.2	2021
Kazakhstan	Central Asia	Upper middle income	35.29%	2022	4.28	2018	4.299	2021		
Kenya	Eastern Africa	Lower middle income	48.72%	2022	2.91	2021	2.923	2021		
Kyrgyzstan	Central Asia	Lower middle income	43.35%	2022	4.04	2020	4.375	2022		
Cambodia	South-eastern Asia	Lower middle income	55.74%	2022	3.93	2012				
Kiribati	Micronesia	Lower middle income	48.59%	2022	4.04	2020	4.038	2019		
Saint Kitts and Nevis	Caribbean	High income	48.52%	2022						
South Korea	Eastern Asia	High income	32.55%	2022	1.24	2016	2.946	2021	4.9	2022
Kuwait	Western Asia	High income	52.90%	2022	2.80	1973				
Laos	South-eastern Asia	Lower middle income	45.68%	2022	2.95	2019	2.955	2018		
Lebanon	Western Asia	Lower middle income	54.17%	2022	3.09	2012	3.093	2011		
Liberia	Western Africa	Low income	43.24%	2022	2.94	2016	2.941	2016		
Libya	Northern Africa	Upper middle income	44.13%	2022						
Saint Lucia	Caribbean	Upper middle income	48.52%	2022	0.90	2016	0.906	2015		
Sri Lanka	Southern Asia	Lower middle income	42.23%	2022	3.11	2019	3.113	2019		
Lesotho	Southern Africa	Lower middle income	49.51%	2022	1.72	2018	1.722	2017		
Lithuania	Northern Europe	High income	41.84%	2022	1.29	2022	2.625	2021	5.1	2021
Luxembourg	Western Europe	High income	31.48%	2022	2.19	2022	2.787	2021	3.6	2021
Latvia	Northern Europe	High income	34.61%	2022	1.37	2022	2.607	2021	5.2	2022
Morocco	Northern Africa	Lower middle income	49.43%	2022	2.70	2014	2.700	2013		
Moldova	Eastern Europe	Upper middle income	33.29%	2022	4.34	2021	4.344	2021		
Madagascar	Eastern Africa	Low income	50.76%	2022	2.16	2013	2.223	2012		
Maldives	Southern Asia	Upper middle income	57.72%	2022	3.78	2020	3.776	2019		
Mexico	Central America	Upper middle income	64.61%	2022	1.87	2022	2.124	2022	5.8	2022
Marshall Islands	Micronesia	Upper middle income	48.59%	2022	2.84	2020	2.842	2019		
North Macedonia	Southern Europe	Upper middle income	29.66%	2022	1.88	2020	1.878	2019		
Mali	Western Africa	Low income	44.61%	2022	2.93	2021	3.230	2021		
Malta	Southern Europe	High income	34.13%	2022	1.99	2022	3.095	2020		
Myanmar	South-eastern Asia	Lower middle income	51.12%	2022	3.76	2017	3.764	2017		
Montenegro	Southern Europe	Upper middle income	32.13%	2022	2.30	2021	2.141	2021		
Mongolia	Eastern Asia	Upper middle income	42.51%	2022	3.27	2018	3.387	2022		
Mozambique	Eastern Africa	Low income	64.63%	2022	1.59	2020	1.714	2019		
Mauritania	Western Africa	Lower middle income	40.48%	2022	2.98	2014	3.133	2019		
Mauritius	Eastern Africa	Upper middle income	47.40%	2022	2.91	2017	2.915	2017		
Malawi	Eastern Africa	Low income	48.41%	2022	2.85	2020	2.851	2019		
Malaysia	South-eastern Asia	Upper middle income	47.48%	2022	2.26	2019	2.346	2021		
Namibia	Southern Africa	Upper middle income	64.20%	2022	0.96	2016	0.965	2015		
Niger	Western Africa	Low income	49.19%	2022	3.20	2019	3.777	2021		
Nigeria	Western Africa	Lower middle income	42.72%	2022	2.88	2019	2.885	2018		
Nicaragua	Central America	Lower middle income	52.41%	2022	1.98	2014	1.977	2014		
Netherlands	Western Europe	High income	33.14%	2022	1.92	2022	3.625	2021	3.2	2022
Norway	Northern Europe	High income	25.17%	2022	1.94	2021	3.365	2019	3.1	2022
Nepal	Southern Asia	Lower middle income	33.81%	2022	3.50	2011	3.672	2022		
Nauru	Micronesia	High income	48.59%	2022	3.39	2013	3.403	2012		
New Zealand	Australia and New Zealand	High income	34.63%	2022	2.90	2018			4.2	2020
Oman	Western Asia	High income	54.88%	2022						
Pakistan	Southern Asia	Lower middle income	43.94%	2022	4.22	2019	4.222	2018		
Panama	Central America	High income	52.41%	2022	1.23	2021	1.234	2023		
Peru	South America	Upper middle income	57.27%	2022	2.12	2021	2.112	2022		
Philippines	South-eastern Asia	Lower middle income	49.42%	2022	2.91	2021	2.678	2021		
Palau	Micronesia	High income	48.59%	2022	1.00	2014				
Papua New Guinea	Melanesia	Lower middle income	50.25%	2022	1.87	2010	1.870	2009		
Poland	Eastern Europe	High income	34.59%	2022	2.09	2022	3.354	2021	3.3	2021
Puerto Rico	Caribbean	High income	48.52%	2022	2.10	1977				
Portugal	Southern Europe	High income	35.60%	2022	1.85	2022	2.796	2021	4.0	2021
Paraguay	South America	Upper middle income	52.41%	2022	1.83	2022	1.831	2022		
Palestine	Western Asia	Lower middle income	50.06%	2022	2.90	2017	2.898	2016		
Qatar	Western Asia	High income	53.78%	2022			2.556	2017		
Romania	Eastern Europe	High income	35.77%	2022	1.17	2022	1.901	2021	5.0	2021
Russia	Eastern Europe	High income	50.77%	2022	3.08	2020	2.686	2021	4.3	2017
Rwanda	Eastern Africa	Low income	53.94%	2022	2.44	2017	2.437	2016		
Saudi Arabia	Western Asia	High income	54.41%	2022						
Sudan	Northern Africa	Low income	45.04%	2022	3.17	2014	3.175	2014		
Senegal	Western Africa	Lower middle income	47.80%	2022	2.96	2019	3.021	2021		
Singapore	South-eastern Asia	High income	32.89%	2022	1.59	2012				
Solomon Islands	Melanesia	Lower middle income	48.59%	2022	2.76	2013	2.758	2012		
Sierra Leone	Western Africa	Low income	47.00%	2022	3.35	2018	3.352	2018		
El Salvador	Central America	Upper middle income	42.70%	2022	1.92	2022	1.926	2022		
San Marino	Southern Europe	High income	34.84%	2022						
Somalia	Eastern Africa	Low income	44.06%	2022	1.70	2016				
Serbia	Southern Europe	Upper middle income	33.75%	2022	2.28	2021	2.489	2021		
South Sudan	Eastern Africa	Low income	49.39%	2022	1.71	2017	1.788	2016		
São Tomé and Príncipe	Middle Africa	Lower middle income	39.38%	2022	2.57	2017	2.569	2017		
Suriname	South America	Upper middle income	52.41%	2022			2.207	2022		F
Slovakia	Eastern Europe	High income	25.98%	2022	2.97	2022	3.421	2021	2.8	2021
Slovenia	Southern Europe	High income	30.65%	2022	1.97	2022	4.196	2021	3.0	2021
Sweden	Northern Europe	High income	33.75%	2022	1.78	2022	2.806	2021	3.3	2022
Eswatini	Southern Africa	Lower middle income	59.88%	2022	1.41	2017	1.407	2016		
Seychelles	Eastern Africa	High income	52.09%	2022	2.58	2019	2.622	2018		
Syria	Western Asia	Low income	54.25%	2022	3.80	2007	3.798	2022		
Turks and Caicos Islands	Caribbean	High income	48.52%	2022						
Chad	Middle Africa	Low income	46.73%	2022	2.92	2019	2.808	2022		
Togo	Western Africa	Low income	50.03%	2022	2.29	2019	2.785	2021		
Thailand	South-eastern Asia	Upper middle income	51.75%	2022	3.17	2021	3.186	2021		
Tajikistan	Central Asia	Lower middle income	38.12%	2022	2.95	2015	2.953	2015		
Turkmenistan	Central Asia	Upper middle income	47.99%	2022	2.72	1993	2.404	1998		
Timor-Leste	South-eastern Asia	Lower middle income	46.30%	2022	4.04	2014	4.045	2014		
Tonga	Polynesia	Upper middle income	48.59%	2022	3.18	2015	3.965	2021		
Trinidad and Tobago	Caribbean	High income	52.41%	2022	2.07	1992	2.127	1992		
Tunisia	Northern Africa	Lower middle income	41.37%	2022	3.16	2016	3.083	2021		
Turkey	—	Upper middle income	51.68%	2022	2.00	2021	1.988	2021	5.3	2021
Tuvalu	Polynesia	Upper middle income	48.59%	2022	2.68	2010	2.684	2010		
Taiwan	Eastern Asia	High income	34.92%	2022	2.53	2021	3.515	2021		
Tanzania	Eastern Africa	Lower middle income	51.37%	2022	2.88	2018	2.875	2018		
Uganda	Eastern Africa	Low income	52.82%	2022	2.43	2020	2.428	2019		
Ukraine	Eastern Europe	Upper middle income	38.26%	2022	4.25	2020	4.257	2020		
Uruguay	South America	High income	47.17%	2022	2.24	2022	2.162	2022		
United States	Northern America	High income	48.27%	2022	1.42	2022	1.762	2022	6.3	2022
Uzbekistan	Central Asia	Lower middle income	48.30%	2022	2.88	2003	2.495	2022		
Saint Vincent and the Grenadines	Caribbean	Upper middle income	48.52%	2022						
Venezuela	South America	NA	54.96%	2022	2.50	2014	1.244	2006		
Vietnam	South-eastern Asia	Lower middle income	45.82%	2022	2.53	2020	2.569	2022		
Vanuatu	Melanesia	Lower middle income	48.59%	2022	3.04	2020	3.044	2019		
Samoa	Polynesia	Upper middle income	48.59%	2022	2.74	2014	2.738	2013		
Kosovo	Southern Europe	Upper middle income	31.64%	2022	0.50	2018	3.790	2017		
Yemen	Western Asia	Low income	55.11%	2022	3.00	2014	3.005	2014		
South Africa	Southern Africa	Upper middle income	65.41%	2022	1.09	2017	0.857	2014	22.3	2017
Zambia	Eastern Africa	Lower middle income	61.74%	2022	1.10	2015	1.473	2022		
Zimbabwe	Eastern Africa	Lower middle income	58.95%	2022	1.93	2019	2.539	2017		

== See also ==
- Income inequality
- Economic inequality
- Economic mobility
- Median income
- List of countries by inequality-adjusted Human Development Index
- List of countries by percentage of population living in poverty
- List of countries by inequality-adjusted income
