= Economy of Seychelles =

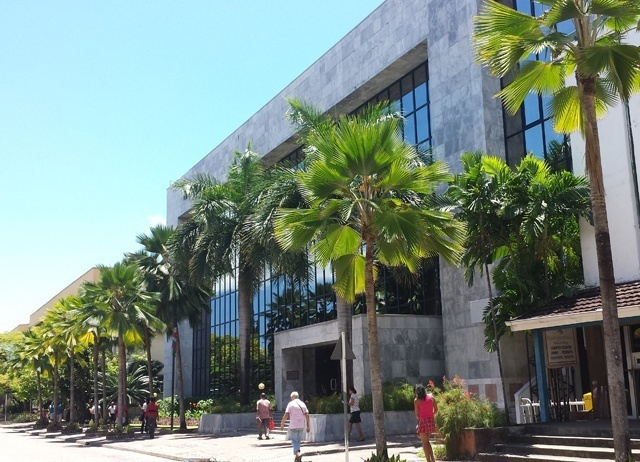
- Central Bank of Seychelles
- Currency: Seychellois rupee (SCR, SR)
- Fiscal year: Calendar year
- Trade organisations: AU, AfCFTA (signed), WTO, COMESA, SADC
- Country group: Developing/Emerging; High-income economy

Statistics
- GDP: ▲$2.251 billion (nominal;2026); ▲$4.593 billion (PPP; 2026)
- GDP rank: 173th (nominal; 2026); 176th (PPP; 2026)
- GDP growth: ▲3.5% (2025); 3.5% (2026f)
- GDP per capita: ▲$19,157 (nominal;(2026 est.); ▲$37,813 (PPP;(2026 est.)
- GDP per capita rank: 65th (nominal; 2026); 60th (PPP; 2026)
- GDP by sector: Agriculture: 2.5%; Industry: 13.8%; Services: 83.7%; (2017)
- Gini coefficient: 46.8 high (2013)
- Human Development Index: ▲0.848 very high (2023) (54th); ▲0.755 high IHDI (49th) (2023)
- Labour force by occupation: Agriculture: 3%; Industry: 23%; Services: 74%; (2006)
- Unemployment: ▼3.7% (2017)
- Main industries: Fishing, tourism, beverages

External
- Exports: ▲$564.8 million (2017 est.)
- Export goods: Canned tuna, frozen fish, petroleum products (reexports)
- Main export partners: United Arab Emirates 28.5%; France 24%; Germany 13.8%; Turkey 8.9%; United Kingdom 4.6%; (2017)
- Imports: ▲$1.155 billion (2017 est.)
- Import goods: Machinery and equipment, foodstuffs, petroleum products, chemicals, other manufactured goods
- Main import partners: United Arab Emirates 13.4%; France 9.4%; Spain 5.7%; South Africa 5%; (2017)
- Current account: ▼ −$307 million (2017 est.)
- Gross external debt: ▼$2.559 billion (31 December 2017 est.)

Public finance
- Government debt: ▼63.6% of GDP (2017 est.)
- Foreign reserves: ▲$545.2 million (31 December 2017 est.)
- Budget balance: −0.5% (of GDP) (2017 est.)
- Revenue: 593.4 million (2017 est.)
- Spending: 600.7 million (2017 est.)
- All values, unless otherwise stated, are in US dollars.

Seychelles has a developing economy based on fishing, tourism, processing of coconuts and vanilla, coir rope, boat building, printing, furniture and beverages. Agricultural products include cinnamon, sweet potatoes, cassava (tapioca), bananas, poultry and tuna.

== Economic history ==
The French originally settled the Seychelles in 1770, setting up plantations which relied heavily on slave labour to produce cotton, sugar, rice, and maize. The British took control of the Seychelles during the Napoleonic Wars without removing the French upper class.

After the British prohibited slavery in 1835, the influx of African workers did not end because British warships captured Arab slavers and forced the liberated slaves to work on plantations as apprentices without pay.

In the 1960s, about 33% of the working population worked at plantations, and 20% worked in the public or government sector.

=== Advent of the tourist industry (1971) ===
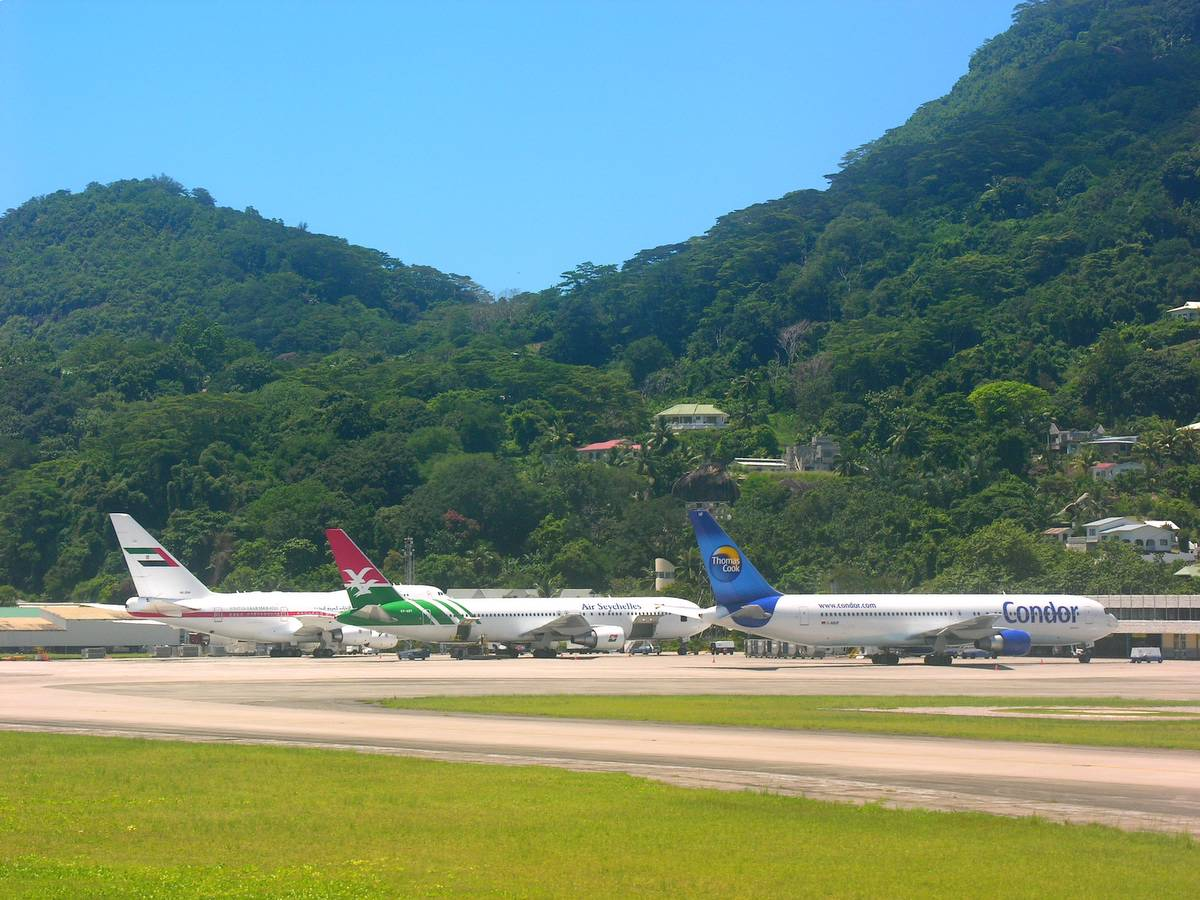
Aircraft at Seychelles International Airport.

Plantations were the main industry of the Seychelles until 1971, when the international airport opened. Overnight, tourism became a serious industry, basically dividing the economy into plantations and tourism. The tourism sector paid better, and the plantation economy could only expand so far.

The plantation sector of the economy declined in prominence, and tourism and fishing became the primary industries of Seychelles. In the 1960s, about 33% of the working population worked at plantations, but by 2006 it was less than 3%.

While the tourism and industrial fishing industries were flourishing in the late 1990s, the traditional plantation economy atrophied. Cinnamon barks and copra—traditional export crops—dwindled to negligible amounts by 1991. There were no exports of copra in 1996; 318 tons of cinnamon bark was exported in 1996, reflecting a decrease of 35% in cinnamon bark exports from 1995.

The US military Indian Ocean Tracking Station on Mahé operated from 1963 until 1996.

== Current economy ==
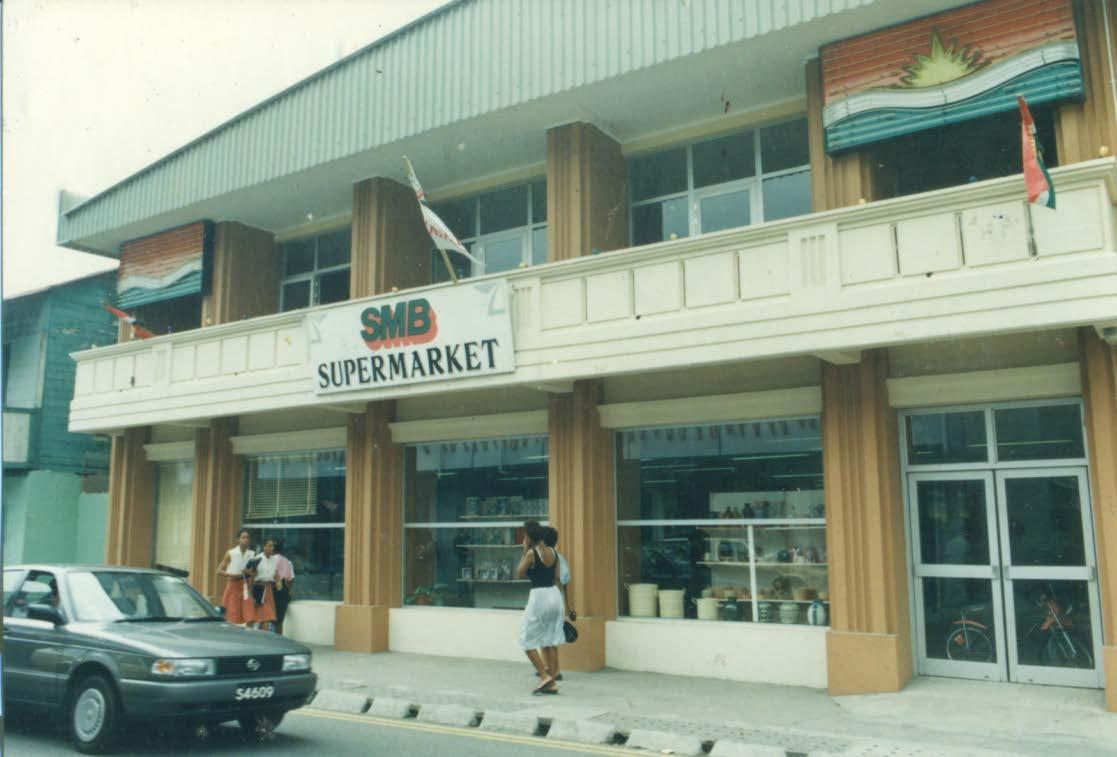
One of the supermarkets by the Seychelles Marketing Board, built in 1984

Although industries have rebounded since the Gulf War, the government recognises the continuing need for upgrading the sector in the face of stiff international competition. Other issues facing the government during the mid 2000s were the curbing of the budget deficit and the further privatisation of public enterprises.

Despite attempts to improve its agricultural base and emphasise locally manufactured products and indigenous materials, Seychelles imports 90% of the food it consumes. The exceptions are some fruits and vegetables, fish, poultry, pork, and beer. In addition to that, Seychelles also produces cigarettes, paint, and a few plastic items. Imports of all kind are controlled by the Seychelles Marketing Board (SMB), a government parastatal which operates all the major supermarkets and is the distributor and licensor of most other imports.

In 2020, the Corruption Perception Index from Transparency International assessed Seychelles as the least corrupt country in Africa.

=== Economic growth ===
Tourism roared back at a record pace setting successive records in 2006 and again in 2007 for number of visitors. The increased availability of flights to and from the archipelago due in part to new entrants Emirates and Qatar Airways is also beginning to show. Both at official exchange rates and at purchasing power parity (PPP), Seychelles remains the richest territory in Africa in terms of GDP per capita (US$9,440.095 at real exchange rates and US$17,560.062 at PPP 2008 estimate),

Because of economic contraction (the economy declined by about 2% in 2004 and 2005 and lost another 1.4% in 2006 according to the International Monetary Fund) the country was moving downward in terms of per capita income. However, the economy bounced back in 2007, growing by 5.3% due in part to record tourism numbers and the booming building and offshore industries. The IMF forecast further growth in 2008 with continuing increase in the GDP per capita.

In October 2008, as tourism and fishing revenue began slowing, the Seychelles defaulted on a $230 million debt. The International Monetary Fund stepped with a two-year, $26 million rescue package. The rescue package came with a few stipulations; The country laid off 1,800 government workers, floated its currency, lifted foreign exchange controls and sold off state assets. At the time, the country's $800 million external foreign debt was equivalent to almost 175 per cent of its gross domestic product.

The decision to let the currency trade freely as part of the IMF rescue package means that Seychelles is the smallest country in the world that has a completely independent currency – one that is neither pegged, nor an adopted foreign currency, nor a common currency used within a larger monetary union. When the Seychellois rupee became freely floated on 3 November 2008, its value quickly fell drastically, decreasing from eight per US dollar to 16, effectively doubled the prices of imports.

The global recession and piracy in the Indian Ocean hit Seychelles hard in 2009, with the GDP projected to contract by 7.5 per cent. However the government exceeded its fiscal targets, with a primary surplus of 13.4% of GDP in the first nine months of 2009 according to the IMF. They report expenditure has been tightly controlled and revenue has held up well despite the difficult economic environment.

In May 2010 an International Monetary Fund mission visited Seychelles and concluded the country is making progress. The head of the mission, Mr. Jean Le Dem, said at the conclusion of the visit:

The economy is recovering from a recession that put real gross domestic product (GDP) to almost a stand in 2009. Real GDP is projected to grow at 4 per cent in 2010, reflecting primarily a rebound in tourism earnings. Twelve-month inflation, which was negative during the past few months, is expected to return to about 1 per cent by year-end

In 2017 the Seychelles joined the World Trade Organisation, facilitated by Omani economist Hilda al-Hinai, who chaired the Working Group.

== Sectors ==
=== Tourism and fishing ===
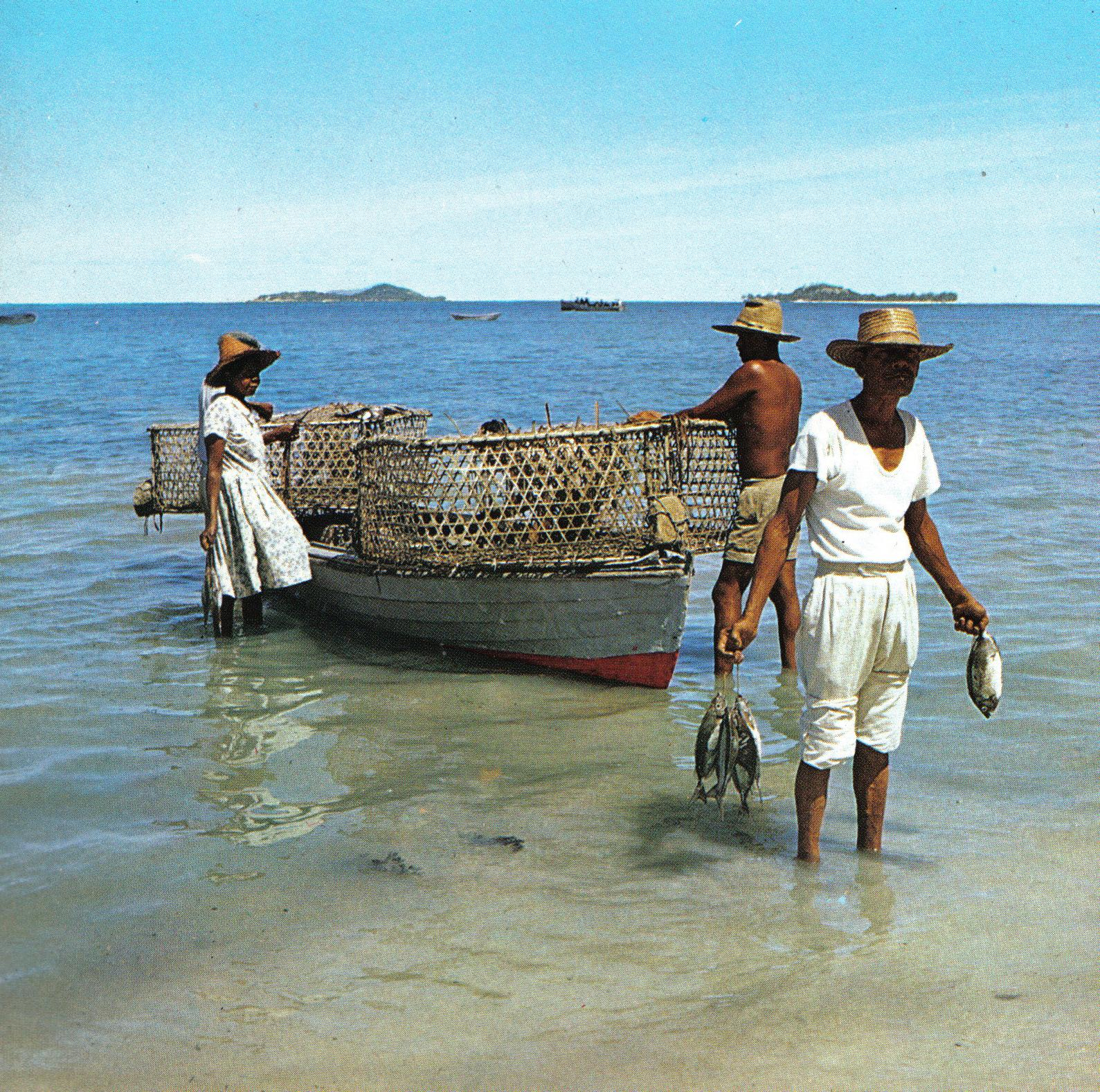
Fisherman landing his catch in the early 1970s

Tourism is one of the most important sectors of the economy, accounting for approximately 16.6% (2000) of GDP. Employment, foreign earnings, construction, banking, and commerce are all dominated by tourism-related industries. Tourism earned $631 million in 1999–2000. About 213,036 tourists visited Seychelles in 2013, with France being the leading market.

In 2000, industrial fishing surpassed tourism as the most important foreign exchange earner. Manufacturing, construction, and industrial fishing, notably tuna fishing, account for about 28.8% of the GDP. Earnings are growing annually from licensing fees paid by foreign trawlers fishing in Seychelles' territorial waters.

In 1995, Seychelles saw the privatisation of the Seychelles Tuna Canning Factory, 60% of which was purchased by the American food company Heinz. Similarly, some port operations have been privatised, a trend that has been accompanied by a fall in transshipment fees and an increase in efficiency. Overall, this has sparked a recovery in port services following a drastic fall in 2009.

=== Offshore oil and gas ===
New detailed studies and exploration shows that the Seychelles potentially have large off-shore petroleum reservoirs which are yet to be discovered. Drills have proven the presence of:

1. Oil-prone source rocks containing Type II kerogen in coaly deltaic shales of the Middle Jurassic and in marine shales of the Upper Jurassic;
2. Mixed source rocks bearing Type II/III kerogen in deltaic marine shales of the Lower Cretaceous that are II correlative of oil-generating shales in Somalia;
3. Gas-prone sources containing Type I kerogen in Upper Triassic fluvial shales and Paleocene marine shales, the latter being correlative of oil and gas generating source rocks of the Deep Continental Shelf trend of the Bombay High Oil Province offshore west India;
4. Evidence of hydrocarbon generation and migration with well shows, such as 0.7 ml benzene in DST-1 of Reith Bank-1, 10,010 ppm of 99.8% n-C4 headspace gas coincident with as small fault in the same well and 20% petrol vapours at an immature level of volcanics in Owen Bank A-1;
5. Clastic reservoirs with measured porosities up to 22% in the Early-Middle Jurassic;
6. Sealing lithologies occur both locally in syn-rift, and regionally in post-rift sequences;
7. An extensive seismic dataset, plus a variety of remote sensing data have been collected which bolster the well data by confirming the presence of:
8. A variety of trapping styles, dominated by tilted fault blocks, stratigraphic pinchouts and reefs;
9. Multiple heating events, with the principal event post-dating trap formation; and
10. Hydrocarbon generation and migration with the presence of: a) numerous DHIs on seismic, including gas chimneys, flat spots, bright spots, phase changes and chemosynthetic reefs; b) gas sniffer anomalies, involving ethane/iso-butane in the southeast and propane/normal butane/total hydrocarbon in the north and northeast; c) UV fluorescence anomalies, especially over the wells and in the southeast; and d) 4 types of beach-stranded tar that correlate to the local source rock stratigraphy.

However, to date all exploratory and stratigraphic test wells (a total of 9 since the 1970s) in the Seychelles have failed to find commercial hydrocarbons. The most recent wildcat by Enterprise Oil in 1995 detected gas but failed to find hydrocarbons.

Several oil and gas exploration companies are active in the Seychelles offshore. These include East African Exploration (EAX) (a subsidiary of Afren), Avana Petroleum (a subsidiary of Vanoil Energy) and WHL Energy.

Beginning at the turn of the millennium the Seychelles Petroleum Company (SEPEC) started to develop the first fleet of modern petroleum double-hull tankers, with five vessels, which was completed by late 2007/early 2008 with the possibility to build more in the near future. The Seychelles President claims that this has opened the door to a new industry for his country and encouraged economic growth by further removing over-reliance on traditional trades like fisheries and tourism, which is now falling rapidly as the country's main income but nevertheless, has experienced significant growth in recent years.

The country has also increased its capacity for wind power, with windfarms on Romainville Island.

=== Agriculture ===
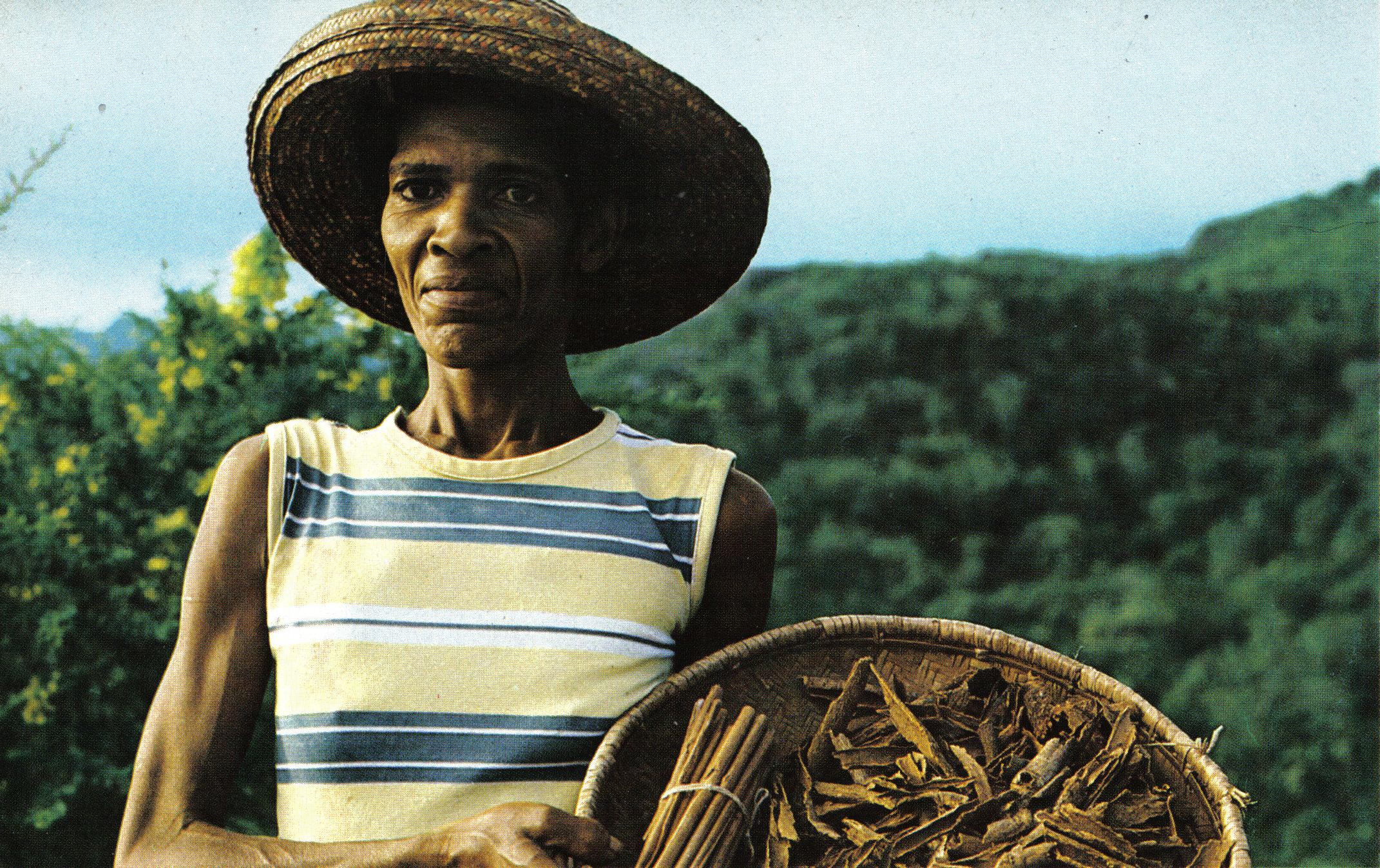
A cinnamon quill maker in Seychelles

Seychelles' Ministry of Agriculture and Marine Resources in 1993 gave up the management of five state-owned farms, which were divided into small plots and leased to individuals. In addition, the agricultural sector consisted of state farms of the Seychelles Agricultural Development Company (Sadeco) and the outer islands managed by the IDC; three other large holdings producing mainly coconuts, cinnamon, and tea; about 250 families engaged in full-time production of foodstuffs; and an estimated 700 families working on a part-time basis. Many households cultivate gardens and raise livestock for home consumption.

The total cultivable area of the islands is only about 400 hectares. Although rainfall is abundant, wet and dry seasons are sharply defined. Better irrigation and drainage systems are needed to improve food crops. The government has taken various measures to reduce dependency on imported foods, including deregulating production and marketing and reducing the trades tax on fertilisers and equipment. As a result, vegetable and fruit production climbed from 505 tons in 1990 to 1,170 tons in 1992. This increase failed to be matched by a commensurate decrease in imports of fruits and vegetables, which reached 3,471 tons in 1992. Local consumption had apparently increased, and substitution between imported and domestic foodstuffs was possible only to a limited degree. In most cases, imported produce is significantly cheaper in spite of air freight, import taxes, and other costs, necessitating a high import markup by the SMB to prevent disruption of domestic production. Neither rice, a dietary staple, nor other grains can be grown on the islands.

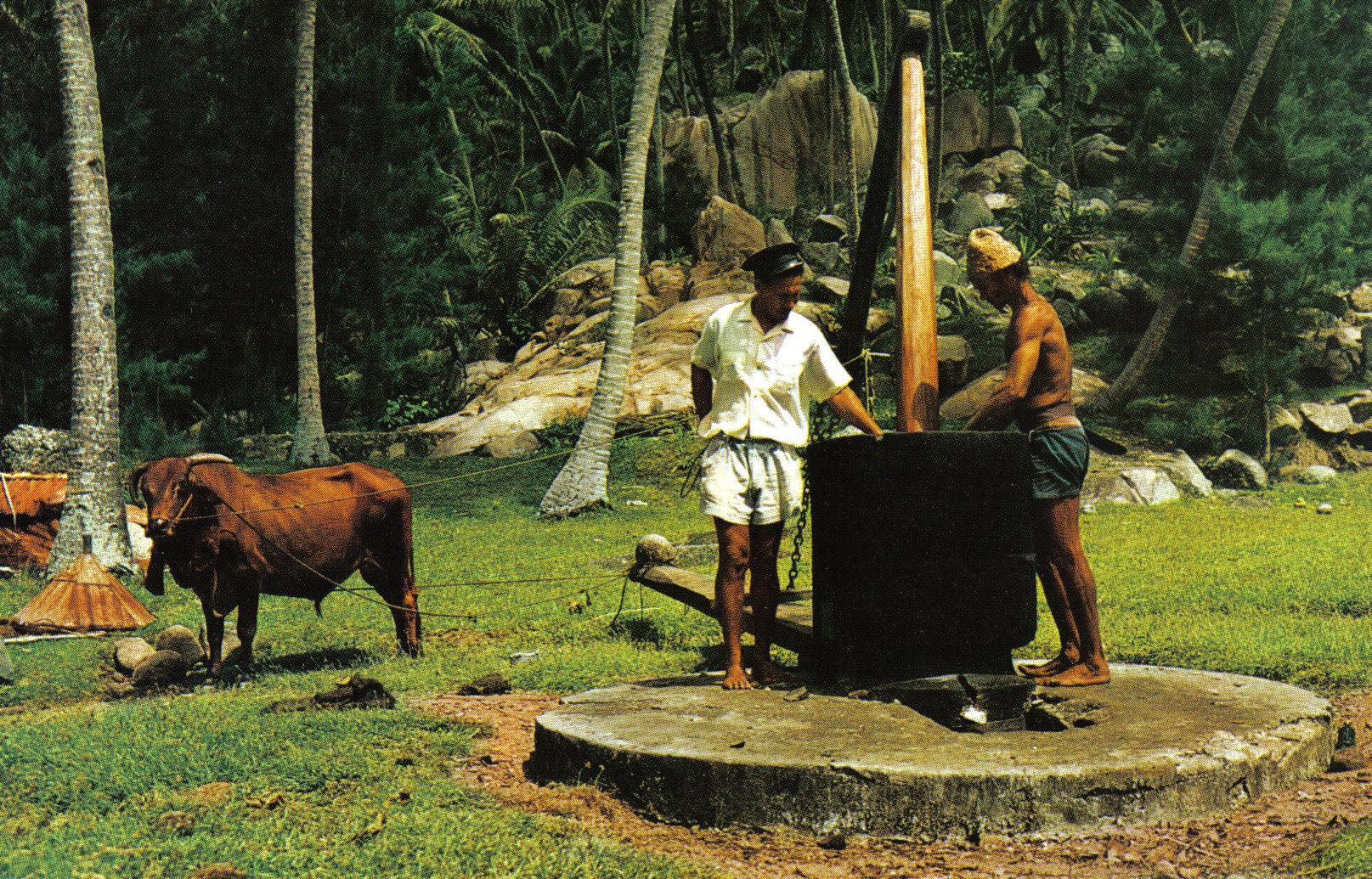
Coconut oil production in Seychelles

The expansion of livestock production is hampered by encroachment of housing and other development on agricultural land as well as by increased labour and animal feed costs. The number of cattle slaughtered in 1992 (329 head) was virtually unchanged from five years earlier. The slaughter of pigs (4,598) was about 45 per cent higher than 1987, and chicken production (439,068) had risen by 60 per cent.

The two traditional export crops of copra (dried coconut meat from which an oil is produced) and cinnamon have declined greatly because of the high cost of production and pressure from low-cost competitors on the international market. Vanilla, formerly important, is produced on a very small scale. Tea grown on the misty slopes of Mahé is a more recent plantation crop, serving mainly the local market.

=== Transport ===
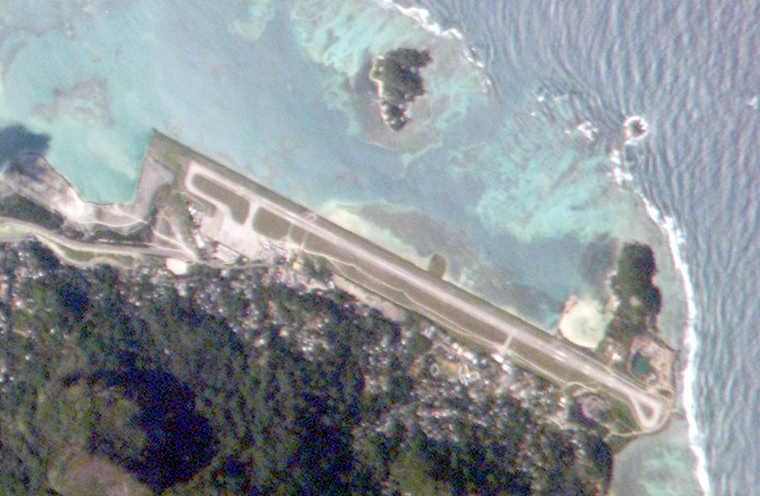
Seychelles International Airport

There are a number of modes of transport in Seychelles. Seychelles possesses transportation systems that include 453km of roads (of which 400km are paved), seaports, and airports. The country lacks both railways and a merchant navy. The main seaport is Victoria. Several islands of Seychelles have a bus system.

In rural areas, especially on La Digue, a popular way of public transport is by using ox-carts.

=== Telecommunications ===
In the Seychelles, local and international telecommunications lines are operated by Cable & Wireless. In 1997 there were around 11,000 telephone lines and in excess of 20,000 telephones, meaning that over half of the population have a home telephone.

The FEBA Seychelles station was decommissioned at the end of March 2003, and short wave broadcasts were transferred to other stations, many in the former Soviet Union.

=== Education ===
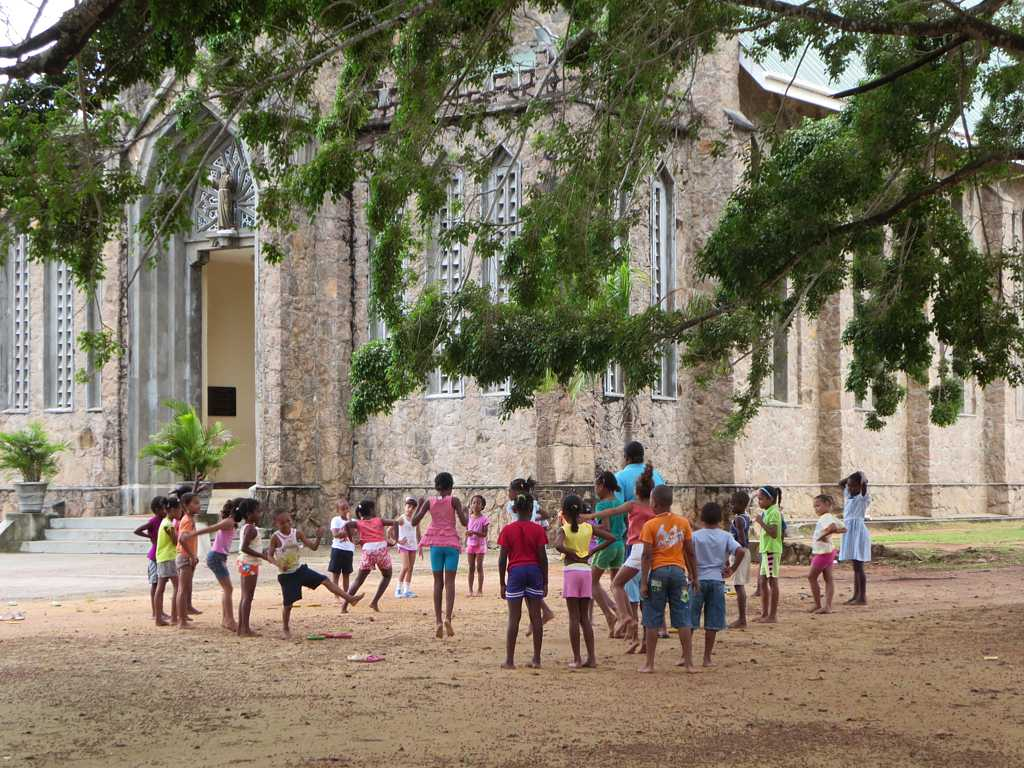
Children take a class beside the neo-Gothic Church of St. Francis of Assisi (1953) in Baie Lazare on Mahe Island, Seychelles.

Education in Seychelles is free and compulsory from the ages of 6 to 15. The language of instruction is Creole from ages 6 to 10, and then English is gradually introduced as the language of instruction, with French introduced as a foreign language. It has evolved from private mission schools to compulsory public education in the modern system. It is the only African country whose education system features among the top 50 in the world. Seychelles has the highest literacy rate of any country in sub-Saharan Africa at 96.20%. According to The World Factbook – Central Intelligence Agency as of 2018, 95.9% of the population age 15 and over can read and write in Seychelles were respectively literate.

=== Healthcare ===
Seychelles has reached the epidemiological shift from communicable to noncommunicable diseases. Most communicable and infectious diseases have been controlled or eradicated. In 2014 the World Health Organization reported that the country was on target to achieve the Millennium Development Goals and had addressed some of the social determinants of health.

== Macroeconomic trend ==
=== Main indicators ===
The following table shows the main economic indicators in 1980-2026. Inflation below 5% is in green.

Year	GDP			GDP growth (real)	Inflation	Government debt (% of GDP)
Year	Total (bil. US$ PPP)	Per capita (US$ PPP)	Total (bil. US$ nominal)	GDP growth (real)	Inflation	Government debt (% of GDP)
1980	0.3	4231	0.1	▼ -2.3	▲13.5	n/a
1985	▲0.4	▲5700	▲0.2	▲10.3	▲0.6	n/a
1990	▲0.6	▲8235	▲0.4	▲7.5	▲4.0	▲80.4
1995	▲0.7	▲9940	▲0.5	▲0.5	▲0.5	▲133.5
2000	▲1.1	▲13461	▲0.6	▲4.3	▲6.3	▲177.8
2005	▲1.2	▲14573	▲0.9	▲9.0	▲0.6	▼144.1
2006	▲1.4	▲16096	▲1.0	▲9.4	▲ -1.9	▼135.1
2007	▲1.5	▲17824	1.0	▲10.4	▲5.3	▲144
2008	1.5	▼17579	1.0	▼ -2.1	▲37.0	▲192.1
2009	1.5	▼17292	▼0.8	▼ -1.1	▲31.8	▼106.1
2010	▲1.7	▲18345	▲1.0	▲6.3	▲ -2.4	▼82.2
2011	▲1.8	▲19370	1.0	▲5.7	▲2.6	▲82.5
2012	▲1.9	▲19966	▲1.1	▲3.8	▲7.1	▼80.1
2013	▲2.0	▲21066	▲1.3	▲6.4	▲4.3	▼68.2
2014	▲2.2	▲21895	▲1.4	▲4.7	▲1.4	▲70.4
2015	▲2.4	▲23489	1.4	▲8.9	▲4.0	▲75.4
2016	▲2.7	▲25959	▲1.6	▲12.1	▲ -1.0	▼64.3
2017	▲2.9	▲27606	▲1.7	▲7.0	▲2.9	▼56.7
2018	▲3.1	▲28495	▲1.8	▲4.9	▲3.7	▼51.3
2019	▲3.3	▲29976	▲1.9	▲5.5	▲1.8	▼48.9
2020	▼3.1	▼26836	▼1.4	▼ -11.8	▲1.2	▲77.4
2021	▼3.0	▼25543	▲1.5	▲0.6	▲9.8	▼71
2022	▲3.5	▲29455	▲2.0	▲9.9	▲2.6	▼60.6
2023	▲3.8	▲31516	▲2.2	▲5.2	▲ -1.0	▼55.1
2024	▲4.0	▲32749	2.2	▲3.4	▲0.3	▲56.1
2025	▲4.4	▲34857	▲2.3	▲5.1	▲0.3	▼51.5
2026	▲4.6	▲35855	2.3	▲1.5	▲2.6	▲55

== Other statistics ==
Exports of Seychelles by product category (2019) Chemical products Transportation Machines Mineral products Plastics and rubbers Metals Foodstuffs Precious metals Textiles Instruments Animal products Vegetable products Paper goods Footwear and headwear Miscellaneous Stone and glass Wood products Animal and vegetable bi-products Animal hides Arts and antiques Weapons

Labor force:
47,210 (2017 est.)

Industries:
fishing, tourism, processing of coconuts and vanilla, coir (coconut fibre) rope, boat building, printing, furniture; beverages

Industrial production growth rate:
2.3% (2017 est.)

Agriculture – products:
coconuts, cinnamon, vanilla, sweet potatoes, cassava (tapioca), bananas; poultry; tuna

== See also ==
- Seychelles Blue Bond
- Seychelles Port Authority
- Seychelles Revenue Commission
- United Nations Economic Commission for Africa
