= List of countries by wealth per adult =

Wealth share of the richest 1 percent. From Our World in Data. Fully interactive. A higher wealth share correlates with a higher Gini number.

These are lists of countries of the world by wealth per adult, from UBS's Global Wealth Report 2026 and Global Wealth Databook 2023. Wealth includes both financial and non-financial assets.

UBS publishes various statistics relevant for calculating net wealth. These figures are influenced by real estate prices, equity market prices, exchange rates, liabilities, debts, adult percentage of the population, human resources, natural resources and capital and technological advancements, which may create new assets or render others worthless in the future.

In nations where wealth is highly concentrated in a small percentage of people (a higher Gini % in the tables below), the mean (obtained by dividing the total aggregate wealth by the number of adults) can be much higher than the median (the amount that divides the population into two equal groups). From Investopedia: "Wealth distribution often results in higher Gini coefficients compared to income distribution, reflecting more pronounced inequality in wealth even in affluent countries."

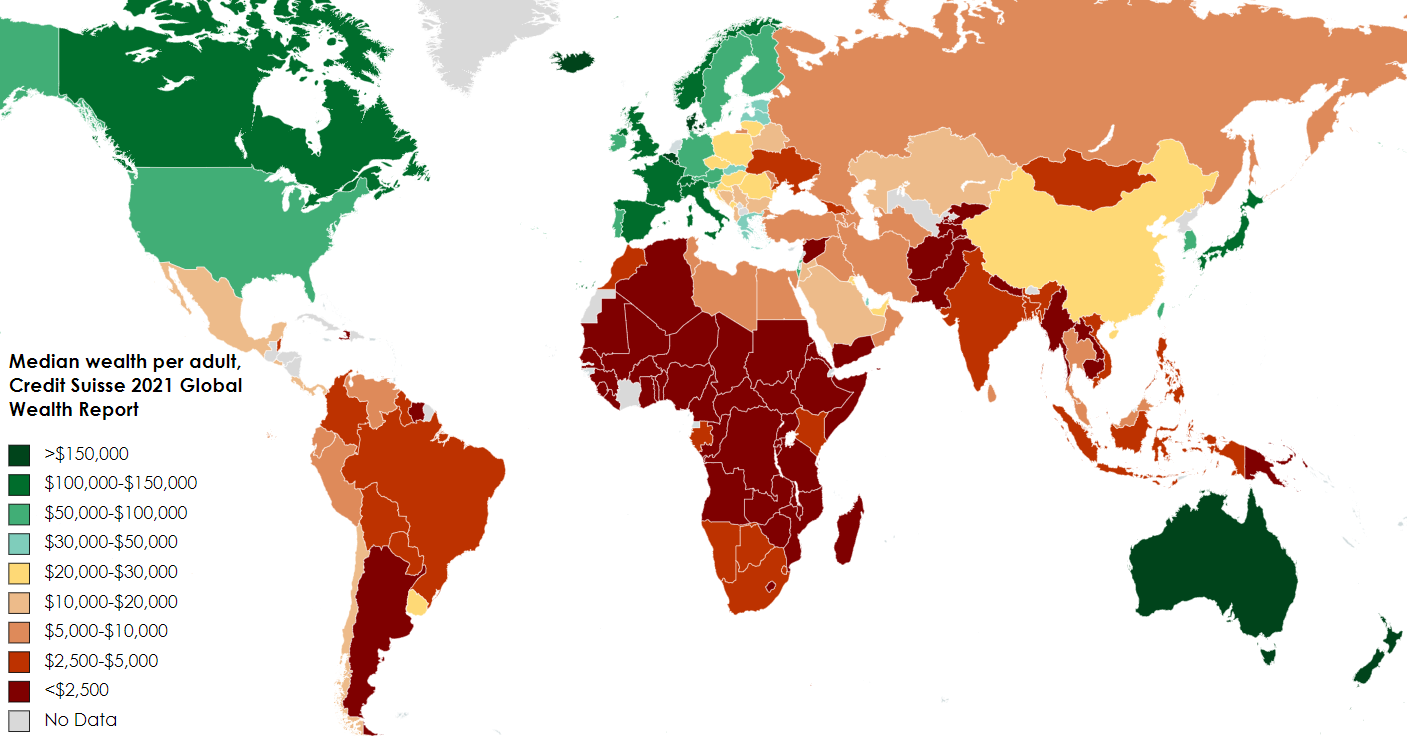
Countries by median wealth (US dollars) per adult. From 2021 publication of Credit Suisse. Using 2020 data.

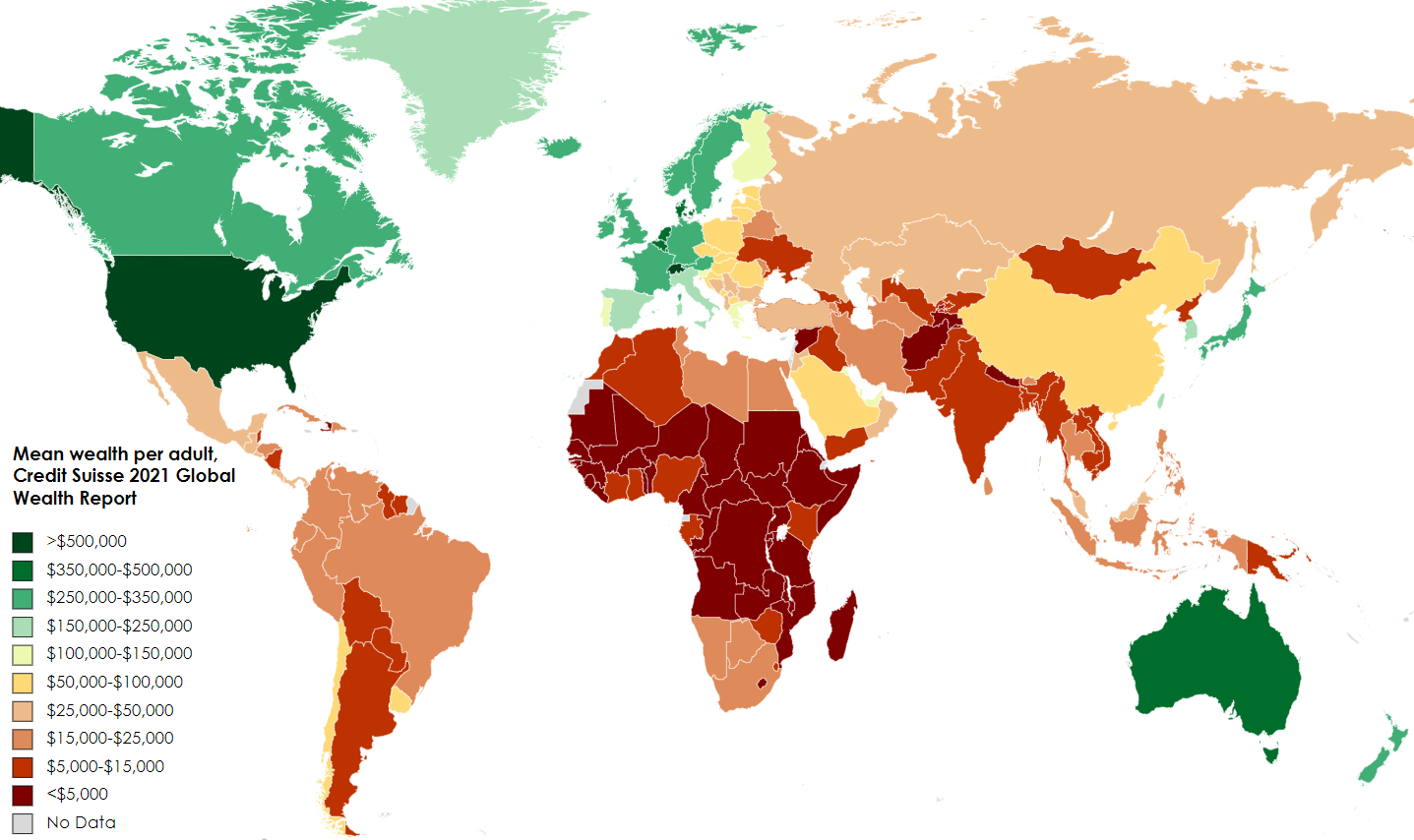
Countries by mean (average) wealth (US dollars) per adult. From 2021 publication of Credit Suisse. Using 2020 data.

== Median and mean wealth (UBS). 2025 data. Top 30 countries only ==
In the last few years UBS stopped providing lists that contained nearly all countries, and has only been creating lists for the top 25 or 30 countries. Median and mean (average) wealth per adult, in US dollars. They are not the exact same countries in both lists.

- Location links are "Wealth in Location" or "Economy of Location" links.

Median wealth per adult in US dollars: the top 30
Location	Median wealth
Luxembourg	394,005
Belgium	277,166
Australia	210,783
New Zealand	206,617
Denmark	203,771
Hong Kong	187,968
Canada	147,811
Switzerland	145,555
Norway	140,003
Japan	135,745
Italy	131,001
Netherlands	127,407
United Kingdom	125,335
France	121,898
Malta	114,033
Taiwan	113,137
Spain	111,575
South Korea	101,739
Ireland	98,413
Singapore	96,434
Qatar	95,499
Finland	89,695
Sweden	84,039
Israel	83,843
Slovenia	81,366
Portugal	76,978
Austria	71,378
United States	68,998
Greece	59,162
Germany	53,485

Mean (average) wealth per adult in US dollars: the top 30
Location	Mean wealth
Switzerland	910,382
United States	696,277
Luxembourg	654,732
Hong Kong	648,267
Australia	616,306
Singapore	527,217
Denmark	523,344
New Zealand	449,852
Norway	425,391
Netherlands	415,287
Belgium	407,920
Sweden	406,406
Canada	399,886
Germany	346,613
France	341,359
Taiwan	332,533
Ireland	314,167
Israel	312,108
South Korea	311,260
Spain	306,412
United Kingdom	292,808
Austria	279,989
Italy	279,439
Japan	211,846
Finland	209,135
Portugal	195,761
Qatar	188,505
Malta	163,655
United Arab Emirates	157,612
Greece	143,343

== Net assets above US $100,000 (UBS). 2025 data. 27 countries ==
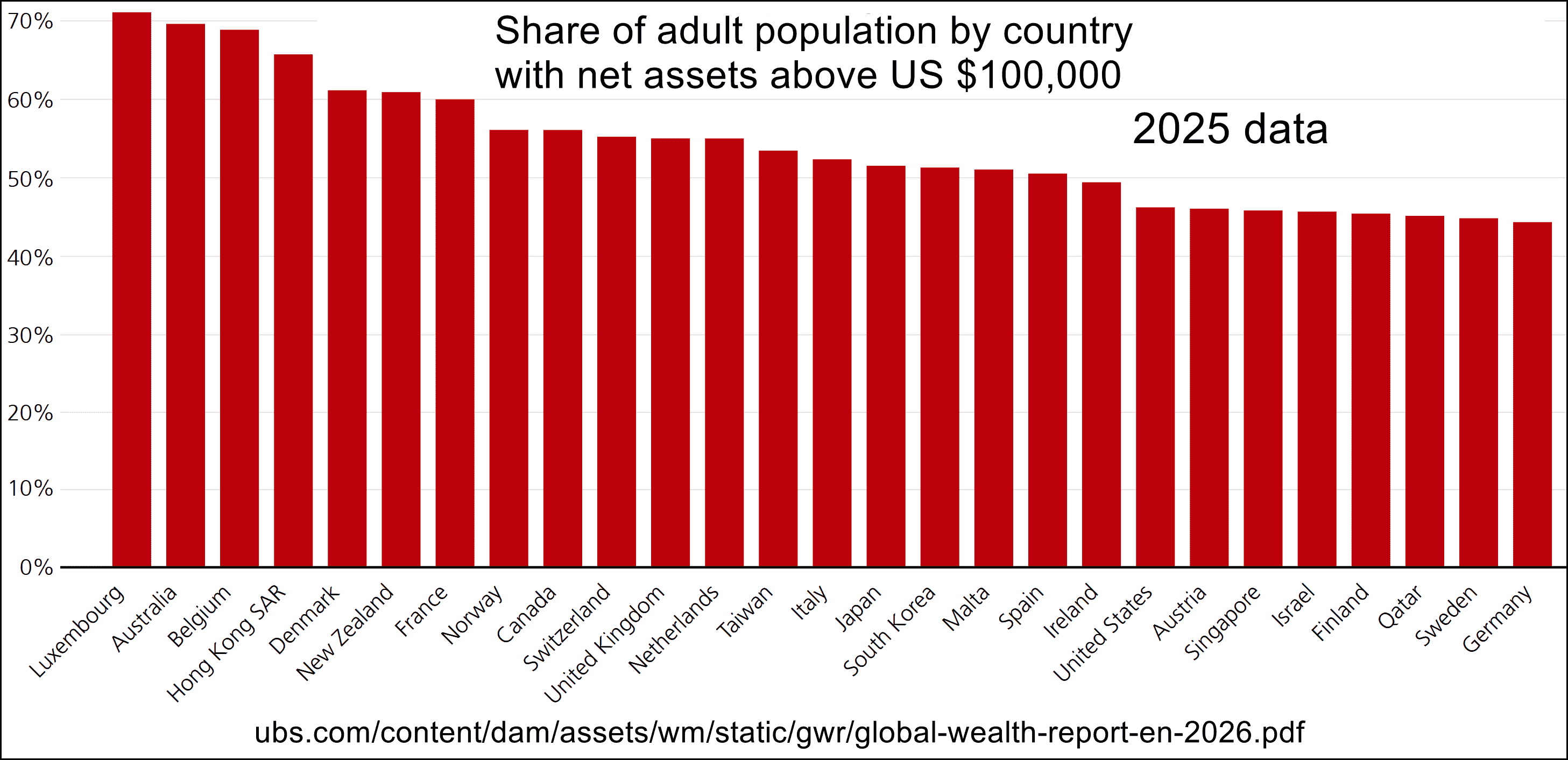
Share of adult population by country with net assets above US $100,000. From UBS.

== Median and mean wealth (UBS). 2022 data. Many countries ==
=== By region ===
- Location links are "Economy of Location" links.

Mean and Median wealth per adult, in US dollars. Distribution of adults (%) by wealth range (USD). Wealth Gini. Total wealth (billion USD). 2023 publication, end-2022 data.

Mean and Median wealth per adult, in US dollars. Distribution of adults (%) by wealth range (USD). Wealth Gini. Total wealth (billion USD). 2023 publication, end-2022 data.
Location	Adults	Mean wealth	Median wealth	Under 10k	10k - 100k	100k - 1M	Over 1M	Gini (%)	Total Wealth
Africa	708,059,000	8,345	1,242	87.4	11.4	1.1	0.1	87.1	5,909
Asia-Pacific (excluding China and India)	1,275,041,000	61,154	5,176	62.3	26.8	10.2	0.8	88.1	77,974
China	1,115,602,000	75,731	27,273	19.3	65.6	14.5	0.6	70.9	84,485
Europe	589,291,000	177,179	28,611	29.6	38.2	29.4	2.8	80.9	104,410
India	931,224,000	16,500	3,755	73.8	24.0	2.1	0.1	82.5	15,365
Latin America	460,054,000	32,760	6,341	60.4	34.0	5.3	0.3	85.4	15,071
Northern America	284,248,000	531,826	108,918	17.8	29.6	43.8	8.7	82.3	151,170
World	5,363,519,000	84,718	8,654	52.5	34.4	12.0	1.1	88.3	454,385

=== By country ===
Gini: Higher Gini coefficients signify greater inequality in wealth distribution. A Gini coefficient of 0 reflects perfect wealth equality, where all wealth values are the same, while a Gini coefficient of 1 (or 100%) reflects maximal wealth inequality, a situation where a single individual has all the wealth while all others have none.

- Location links are "Wealth in Location" or "Economy of Location" links. See categories: Wealth by country. And: Economies by country.

Mean and Median wealth per adult, in US dollars. Distribution of adults (%) by wealth range (USD). Wealth Gini. 2023 publication, end-2022 data.

Mean and Median wealth per adult, in US dollars. Distribution of adults (%) by wealth range (USD). Wealth Gini. 2023 publication, end-2022 data.
Location	Adults	Mean wealth	Median wealth	Under 10k	10k - 100k	100k - 1M	Over 1M	Gini (%)
Albania	2,200,000	34,839	17,280	38.4	55.3	6.2	0.1	68.6
Algeria	28,349,000	12,491	3,226	82.1	16.0	1.9	0.1	85.2
Angola	15,394,000	5,418	1,716	90.8	8.8	0.4	0.0	81.2
Antigua and Barbuda	71,000	30,634	8,916	53.5	40.8	5.6	0.0	82.5
Argentina	31,540,000	13,323	4,354	76.5	22.1	1.4	0.1	80.0
Armenia	2,179,000	34,988	14,215	42.4	51.6	5.8	0.1	73.2
Aruba	82,000	61,622	18,428	42.7	46.3	9.8	0.0	81.9
Australia	19,564,000	496,819	247,453	9.9	20.9	59.8	9.4	66.3
Austria	7,314,000	245,225	68,492	20.8	34.2	40.8	4.1	76.1
Azerbaijan	7,278,000	21,578	9,209	53.4	43.4	3.1	0.1	72.3
Bahamas	287,000	72,971	10,885	49.5	40.1	9.4	0.7	88.9
Bahrain	1,376,000	84,313	13,904	47.5	45.7	5.8	0.9	89.7
Bangladesh	110,099,000	9,796	3,842	79.2	19.8	1.0	0.0	75.0
Barbados	223,000	91,291	31,436	38.1	41.3	19.3	0.9	80.9
Belarus	7,312,000	34,835	18,466	37.7	56.6	5.5	0.1	67.1
Belgium	9,055,000	352,814	249,937	12.8	19.4	61.9	5.9	59.6
Belize	259,000	14,966	3,928	75.3	22.4	2.7	0.0	83.4
Benin	6,218,000	2,823	922	94.7	5.2	0.1	0.0	79.8
Bolivia	7,395,000	14,222	4,913	74.4	23.9	1.6	0.1	80.6
Bosnia and Herzegovina	2,627,000	33,593	16,484	39.3	54.7	5.8	0.1	69.0
Botswana	1,427,000	16,567	3,591	78.3	18.1	3.4	0.1	88.5
Brazil	157,120,000	29,452	5,702	66.0	29.6	4.1	0.3	88.4
Brunei	318,000	39,908	6,983	56.3	38.7	4.7	0.6	89.0
Bulgaria	5,487,000	47,074	22,759	34.0	57.5	8.1	0.3	70.6
Burkina Faso	10,144,000	1,713	563	98.1	1.8	0.1	0.0	79.6
Burundi	5,741,000	947	453	98.9	1.1	0.0	0.0	70.2
Cambodia	10,532,000	6,036	2,185	90.3	9.1	0.6	0.0	77.5
Cameroon	13,517,000	3,271	910	94.2	5.6	0.2	0.0	83.7
Canada	30,474,000	369,577	137,633	19.9	24.6	48.9	6.7	72.3
Central African Republic	2,296,000	952	260	98.3	1.7	0.0	0.0	85.3
Chad	7,581,000	1,297	483	98.0	2.0	0.0	0.0	77.2
Chile	14,409,000	54,082	19,544	38.7	51.3	9.6	0.4	78.8
mainland China	1,115,602,000	75,731	27,273	19.3	65.6	14.5	0.6	70.9
Colombia	36,500,000	15,464	4,450	76.1	21.7	2.1	0.1	83.1
Comoros	471,000	5,285	1,256	91.1	8.3	0.6	0.0	86.2
DR Congo	42,527,000	1,662	492	96.8	3.1	0.1	0.0	83.0
Congo	2,868,000	1,465	380	97.5	2.4	0.1	0.0	85.4
Costa Rica	3,795,000	55,545	19,356	42.6	47.1	9.8	0.4	79.7
Croatia	3,270,000	70,461	34,837	26.9	57.4	15.3	0.4	69.6
Cyprus	691,000	158,321	40,957	19.0	54.7	24.2	2.2	78.4
Czech Republic	8,519,000	90,393	23,502	26.6	55.7	16.8	0.9	78.5
Denmark	4,559,000	409,954	186,041	15.1	25.0	51.9	8.0	73.6
Djibouti	645,000	3,853	1,285	92.7	7.0	0.3	0.0	78.4
Dominica	50,000	44,406	13,789	46.0	46.0	8.0	0.0	81.1
Ecuador	11,782,000	21,650	7,610	61.5	35.1	3.3	0.1	80.3
Egypt	61,853,000	20,195	6,656	64.8	32.3	2.8	0.1	79.2
El Salvador	4,304,000	47,422	15,049	46.5	44.6	8.6	0.3	81.7
Equatorial Guinea	821,000	30,333	7,501	58.7	35.1	6.0	0.2	87.1
Eritrea	1,802,000	3,688	1,431	93.6	6.3	0.2	0.0	76.0
Estonia	1,035,000	78,777	39,586	30.0	52.8	16.4	0.8	73.1
Ethiopia	61,191,000	4,905	2,124	92.5	7.2	0.2	0.0	72.5
Fiji	574,000	17,998	5,950	66.2	30.3	3.3	0.0	78.5
Finland	4,399,000	179,986	84,093	26.8	28.7	42.4	2.1	72.4
France	50,368,000	312,235	133,137	15.5	26.1	52.7	5.6	70.3
Gabon	1,270,000	16,217	5,487	72.0	25.8	2.0	0.1	79.8
Gambia	1,189,000	2,996	735	94.3	5.6	0.2	0.0	86.0
Georgia	2,930,000	28,169	9,451	52.0	44.3	3.5	0.2	79.7
Germany	68,024,000	256,179	66,735	10.0	46.1	40.0	3.9	77.2
Ghana	17,493,000	6,423	2,622	88.4	11.1	0.5	0.0	75.6
Greece	8,421,000	105,724	53,501	22.3	51.4	25.4	0.9	68.1
Grenada	79,000	64,092	19,736	41.8	46.8	10.1	0.0	81.3
Guinea	6,533,000	6,638	2,060	89.0	10.4	0.6	0.0	81.6
Guinea-Bissau	1,004,000	1,791	664	96.8	3.0	0.1	0.0	77.6
Guyana	509,000	18,587	6,896	63.9	33.2	2.8	0.2	76.8
Haiti	6,885,000	626	207	99.3	0.7	0.0	0.0	81.3
Hong Kong	6,338,000	551,194	202,406	13.3	21.5	55.2	9.9	73.7
Hungary	7,725,000	59,348	26,416	20.3	67.4	12.0	0.3	67.7
Iceland	259,000	498,290	413,193	22.4	14.3	42.9	20.5	64.5
India	931,224,000	16,500	3,755	73.8	24.0	2.1	0.1	82.5
Indonesia	186,544,000	17,457	4,819	67.7	30.4	1.9	0.1	78.0
Iran	59,323,000	51,147	17,341	40.8	50.6	8.2	0.4	78.8
Ireland	3,695,000	247,080	90,741	30.6	22.3	42.4	4.6	79.9
Israel	5,812,000	235,445	77,604	16.5	40.3	40.2	3.0	74.9
Italy	49,781,000	221,370	107,315	19.3	28.9	49.2	2.7	67.8
Jamaica	2,078,000	24,547	7,529	58.7	37.2	3.9	0.1	82.4
Japan	104,511,000	216,078	103,681	11.6	38.4	47.4	2.6	65.0
Jordan	6,041,000	38,923	14,219	43.3	49.9	6.6	0.3	76.5
Kazakhstan	12,373,000	58,205	25,225	39.5	51.6	8.5	0.5	77.4
Kenya	29,346,000	14,829	4,356	76.3	21.4	2.3	0.1	82.8
Korea	42,859,000	230,760	92,719	15.4	34.6	47.1	2.9	67.9
Kuwait	3,224,000	175,072	41,605	41.2	26.9	28.6	3.2	85.4
Kyrgyzstan	4,040,000	8,542	3,398	82.3	16.8	0.8	0.0	74.8
Laos	4,472,000	6,191	1,366	92.3	6.6	1.1	0.0	87.3
Latvia	1,441,000	97,583	46,899	33.0	46.4	19.2	1.3	80.4
Lesotho	1,276,000	1,531	266	96.6	3.4	0.2	0.0	91.1
Liberia	2,661,000	5,886	1,977	89.8	9.8	0.5	0.0	80.1
Libya	4,590,000	13,420	5,223	73.2	25.5	1.2	0.1	76.2
Lithuania	2,115,000	69,541	32,385	27.8	57.2	14.5	0.5	70.6
Luxembourg	510,000	585,950	360,715	12.0	17.6	54.7	15.7	64.8
Madagascar	14,747,000	2,257	658	96.4	3.5	0.1	0.0	82.2
Malawi	9,542,000	2,415	620	95.7	4.2	0.1	0.0	85.1
Malaysia	23,130,000	29,314	8,523	55.0	41.0	3.8	0.2	83.1
Maldives	401,000	25,187	7,970	57.9	37.2	5.0	0.2	81.3
Mali	9,235,000	2,658	863	95.8	4.0	0.1	0.0	80.2
Malta	360,000	160,265	96,835	11.7	39.7	47.2	1.4	60.9
Mauritania	2,518,000	3,013	1,125	94.5	5.3	0.2	0.0	76.4
Mauritius	984,000	68,846	31,103	28.9	55.5	15.1	0.5	71.4
Mexico	87,983,000	55,274	18,920	41.5	47.7	10.3	0.4	79.3
Moldova	3,173,000	20,590	10,131	49.8	47.3	2.8	0.1	69.3
Mongolia	2,097,000	7,578	3,003	84.1	15.2	0.7	0.0	74.2
Montenegro	477,000	81,900	43,438	25.2	53.0	21.2	0.6	68.0
Morocco	25,026,000	13,862	3,896	77.6	20.3	2.0	0.1	82.3
Mozambique	15,210,000	1,353	570	97.9	2.1	0.0	0.0	74.9
Myanmar	36,861,000	7,670	3,636	84.8	14.6	0.5	0.0	68.0
Namibia	1,432,000	20,690	4,832	75.6	19.9	4.4	0.1	87.0
Nepal	19,193,000	4,672	1,685	92.5	7.1	0.3	0.0	77.6
Netherlands	13,591,000	358,235	112,450	13.6	32.7	45.0	8.6	78.8
New Zealand	3,668,000	388,761	193,065	20.8	18.7	53.5	7.0	69.9
Nicaragua	4,263,000	16,083	5,133	72.3	25.5	2.1	0.1	81.6
Niger	10,550,000	1,436	599	98.2	1.7	0.0	0.0	73.9
Nigeria	101,545,000	6,879	1,507	91.2	8.0	0.8	0.0	86.5
Norway	4,267,000	385,338	143,887	14.5	29.2	48.1	8.2	76.9
Oman	3,858,000	48,951	11,377	47.6	45.5	6.4	0.5	87.5
Pakistan	129,747,000	5,226	2,076	90.8	8.9	0.4	0.0	74.4
Panama	2,955,000	50,917	15,724	44.8	45.4	9.4	0.4	82.5
Papua New Guinea	5,197,000	8,606	1,828	90.3	7.8	1.9	0.0	88.6
Paraguay	4,616,000	14,809	4,930	73.8	24.4	1.7	0.1	81.0
Peru	23,041,000	22,514	7,555	61.0	35.7	3.2	0.1	80.1
Philippines	69,804,000	14,486	3,155	84.5	13.3	2.1	0.1	87.3
Poland	30,181,000	52,741	20,263	23.0	65.5	11.2	0.3	68.4
Portugal	8,337,000	158,840	70,409	22.7	43.0	32.3	2.0	70.3
Qatar	2,465,000	164,992	90,262	11.2	43.9	43.7	1.2	58.6
Romania	15,057,000	44,320	21,545	33.7	58.2	7.9	0.3	69.3
Russia	110,998,000	39,514	8,595	55.0	41.0	3.6	0.4	86.9
Rwanda	6,990,000	5,561	1,711	90.5	9.0	0.5	0.0	82.0
Samoa	109,000	11,929	4,150	77.1	21.1	1.8	0.0	77.7
São Tomé and Príncipe	110,000	4,162	1,775	91.8	8.2	0.0	0.0	73.7
Saudi Arabia	24,925,000	90,975	20,701	44.8	42.6	11.2	1.4	86.7
Senegal	8,492,000	5,009	1,664	90.6	9.1	0.4	0.0	79.8
Serbia	5,451,000	34,080	16,462	39.9	54.2	5.8	0.1	69.9
Seychelles	69,000	94,620	37,787	31.9	49.3	18.8	1.4	76.2
Sierra Leone	4,158,000	749	329	99.4	0.6	0.0	0.0	73.3
Singapore	4,977,000	382,957	99,488	16.0	34.2	43.1	6.7	78.8
Slovakia	4,341,000	62,125	40,703	12.0	73.7	14.2	0.1	50.8
Slovenia	1,668,000	112,526	75,600	17.5	52.3	29.3	0.8	64.4
Solomon Islands	367,000	11,660	3,429	81.5	16.1	2.2	0.0	82.0
South Africa	38,667,000	23,956	5,141	73.5	21.7	4.6	0.2	88.8
Spain	37,855,000	224,209	107,507	16.2	31.7	49.1	3.0	68.3
Sri Lanka	14,966,000	23,991	8,615	55.4	40.4	4.1	0.1	77.2
Saint Lucia	141,000	42,301	12,454	48.2	43.3	8.5	0.0	82.7
Saint Vincent and the Grenadines	79,000	23,728	7,357	59.5	36.7	3.8	0.0	81.1
Suriname	392,000	7,885	1,444	89.8	9.2	1.3	0.0	89.2
Sweden	7,866,000	296,800	77,515	34.3	22.8	37.0	5.9	87.4
Switzerland	7,047,000	685,226	167,353	11.7	32.9	39.7	15.6	77.2
Syria	12,229,000	1,911	680	96.8	3.1	0.1	0.0	77.8
Taiwan	19,803,000	273,788	108,247	12.4	35.3	48.5	3.9	69.8
Tajikistan	5,442,000	4,592	1,863	91.5	8.2	0.3	0.0	73.8
Tanzania	29,686,000	4,869	2,005	92.3	7.4	0.3	0.0	74.7
Thailand	54,741,000	25,956	9,602	50.9	46.2	2.8	0.2	76.0
Togo	4,336,000	1,520	488	97.8	2.1	0.1	0.0	81.5
Tonga	60,000	55,898	20,960	36.7	55.0	8.3	0.0	75.9
Trinidad and Tobago	1,042,000	55,939	22,957	39.3	50.6	9.8	0.4	76.3
Tunisia	8,372,000	21,087	7,298	61.5	35.0	3.4	0.1	78.4
Turkey	59,247,000	17,578	5,488	70.6	27.3	2.0	0.1	80.2
Uganda	21,416,000	2,780	798	95.1	4.8	0.1	0.0	83.0
United Arab Emirates	8,138,000	152,556	31,761	42.8	30.3	24.2	2.7	86.9
United Kingdom	52,752,000	302,783	151,825	19.6	24.9	50.6	4.8	70.2
United States	253,681,000	551,347	107,739	17.5	30.3	43.2	9.0	83.0
Uruguay	2,560,000	84,778	33,522	34.0	48.8	16.6	0.7	77.2
Vanuatu	170,000	16,347	5,276	71.2	25.3	2.9	0.0	79.9
Venezuela	19,383,000	33,420	12,955	49.0	44.5	6.4	0.1	77.8
Vietnam	69,792,000	14,569	5,309	75.6	22.4	2.0	0.1	78.8
Yemen	16,241,000	6,492	1,406	92.3	6.6	1.1	0.0	88.4
Zambia	8,987,000	3,761	774	93.6	6.1	0.3	0.0	89.0

== See also ==
- Financial and social rankings of sovereign states in Europe
- High-net-worth individual
- List of countries by financial assets
- List of countries by GDP (PPP) per capita
- List of countries by GNI (nominal) per capita
- List of countries by income inequality
- List of countries by total private wealth
- List of sovereign states by wealth inequality
- Wealth distribution by country
- Wealth inequality in the United States
