= Avana (disambiguation) =

Avanà is a red Italian wine grape variety that is grown in the Piedmont wine region of northwest Italy.

Avana may also refer to:

- AVANA (in Malagasy: Antoko ny Vahoaka Aloha No Andrianina), literally the Party Where the People Are the Priority, a Malagasy political party
- Avana River, a river of the Cook Islands, which flows in Avana Valley
- Avana Petroleum, a company founded in 2007 with assets and activities in Kenya, the Seychelles and wider East Africa/Western Indian Ocean region and purchased eventually by Vanoil Energy

== See also ==
- Avana Ivan (English: Is that him?), a 1962 Indian Tamil-language thriller film directed by S. Balachander
