= Financial and social rankings of sovereign states in Europe =

Overview of financial and social rankings of the sovereign states in Europe

This page compares the sovereign states of Europe on economic, financial and social indicators.

Map of Europe according to the United Nations geoscheme for Europe

== Definition of Europe ==
For purposes of comparison the broader definition of Europe will be used. A sovereign state must meet at least one of the following criteria to be included:

- Be a recognised European state by the United Nations geoscheme for Europe
- Be a member state of the European Union
- Be a member state of the eurozone
- Be a member state of the Council of Europe

== Economic ==
=== Countries by GDP (nominal) ===
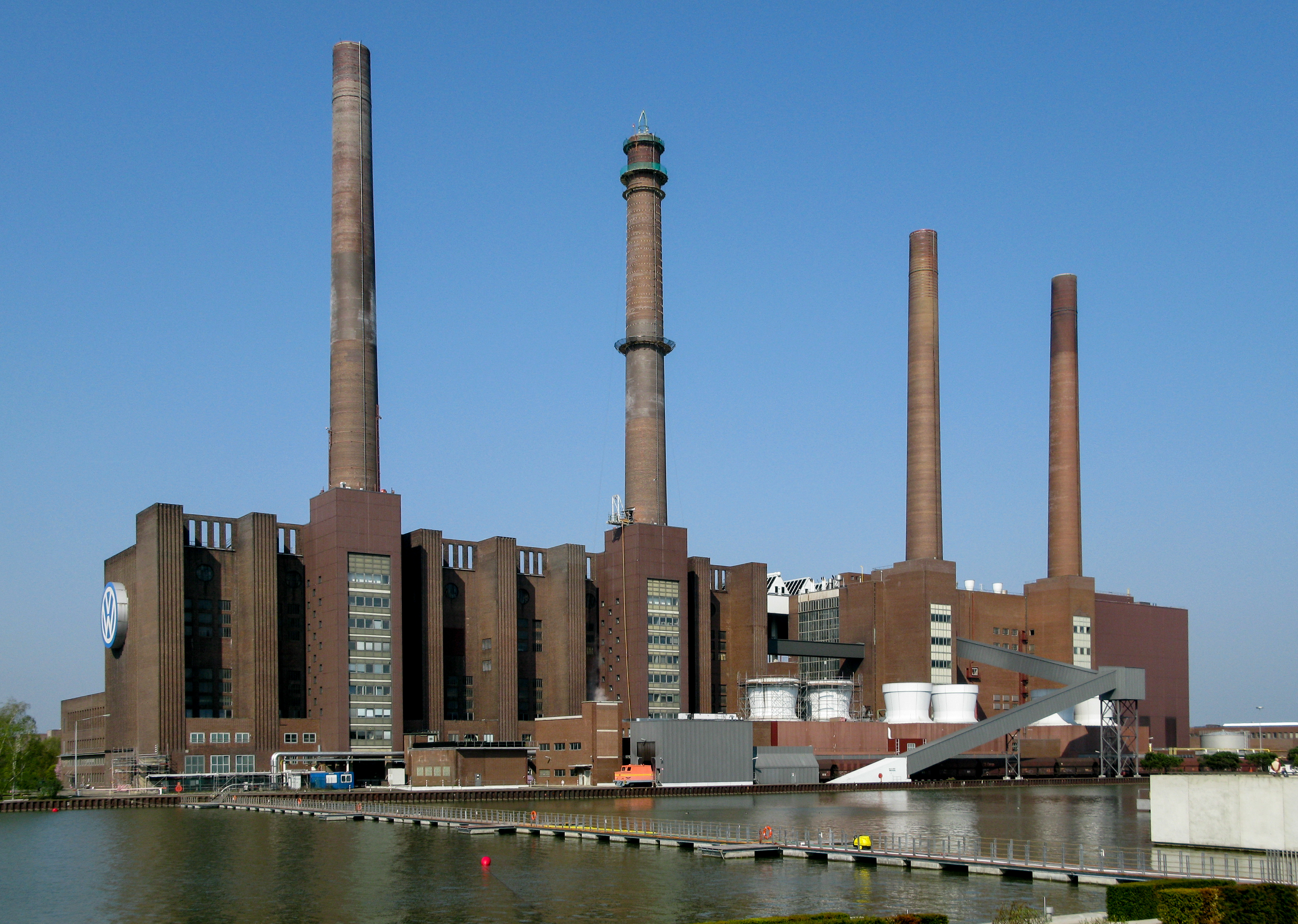
Volkswagen AG's headquarters in Wolfsburg is the base for Germany's largest company by revenue.

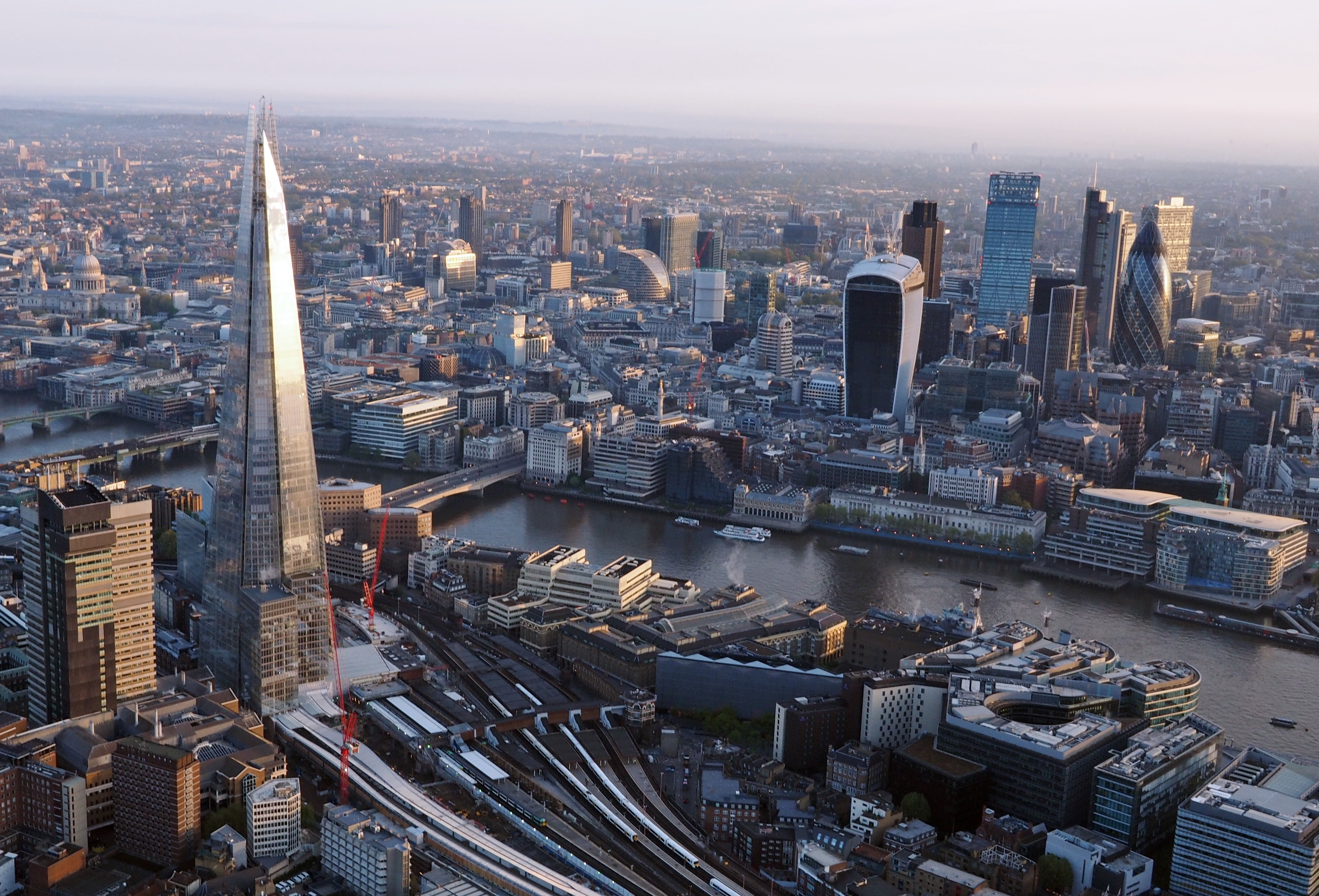
London is considered to be the leading financial capital in Europe.

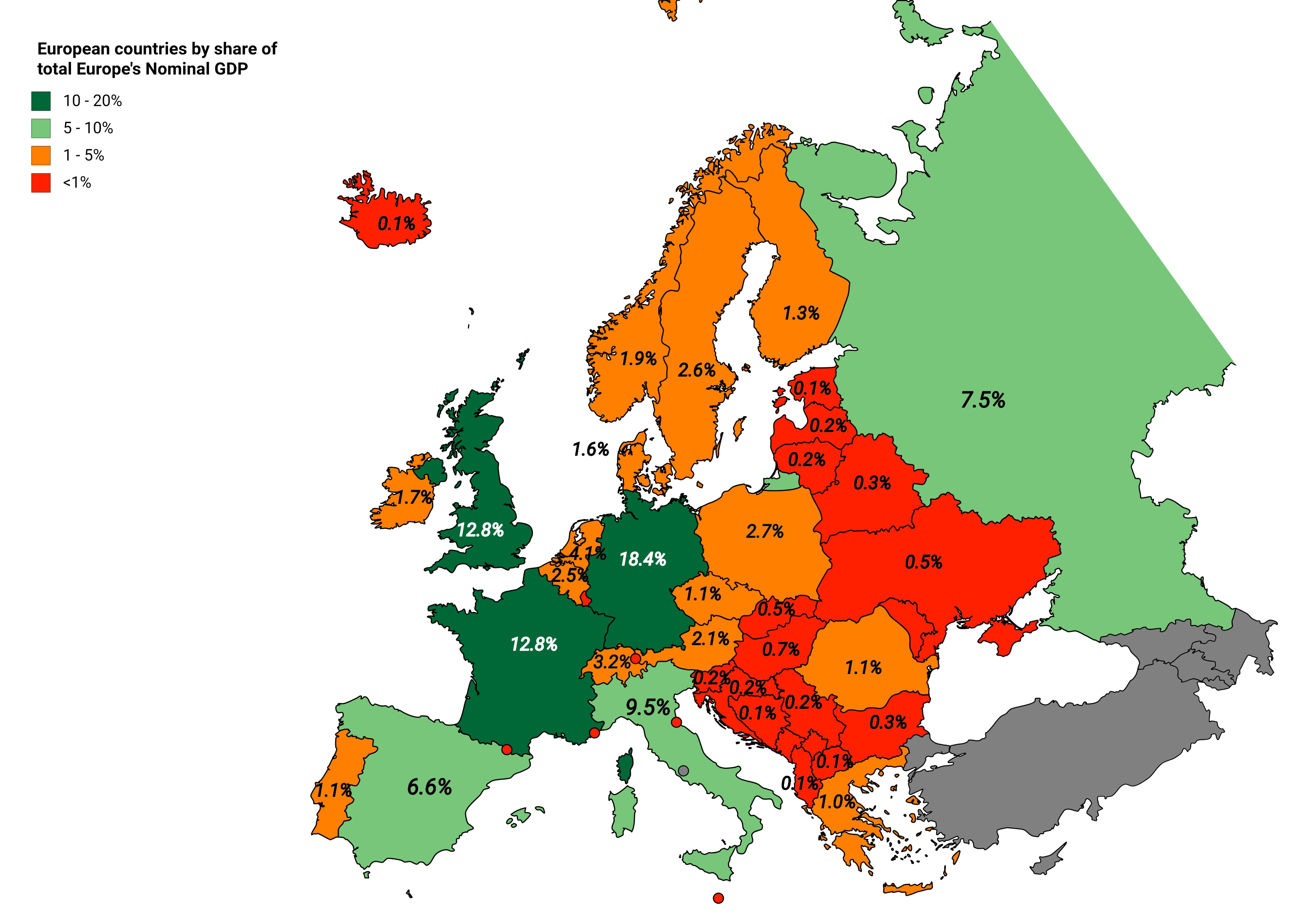
European countries by share of total Europe's nominal GDP

Data provided is by the International Monetary Fund (2026)

Rank	Country	GDP (millions of US$)
1	Germany	5,750,000
2	United Kingdom	4,360,000
3	France	3,880,000
4	Italy	2,738,000
5	Russia	2,656,000
6	Spain	2,091,000
7	Turkey	1,640,100
8	Netherlands	1,449,806
9	Switzerland	1,146,000
10	Poland	1,134,200
11	Ireland	779,381
12	Belgium	776,730
13	Sweden	760,481
14	Austria	623,719
15	Norway	599,406
16	Denmark	503,772
17	Romania	480,834
18	Czech Republic	432,597
19	Portugal	380,637
20	Finland	337,669
21	Greece	307,554
22	Hungary	271,122
23	Ukraine	225,337
24	Slovakia	168,897
25	Bulgaria	148,121
26	Croatia	116,574
27	Serbia	112,025
28	Luxembourg	110,417
29	Lithuania	105,907
30	Belarus	102,042
31	Slovenia	86,732
32	Azerbaijan	78,372
33	Latvia	53,686
34	Estonia	51,634
35	Cyprus	45,171
36	Iceland	43,800
37	Georgia	42,716
38	Bosnia and Herzegovina	36,771
39	Albania	33,333
40	Armenia	31,873
41	Malta	30,712
42	Moldova	21,889
43	North Macedonia	21,605
44	Monaco	10,724
45	Montenegro	10,227
46	Liechtenstein	9,442
47	Andorra	4,879
48	San Marino	2,417

=== GDP growth rate ===
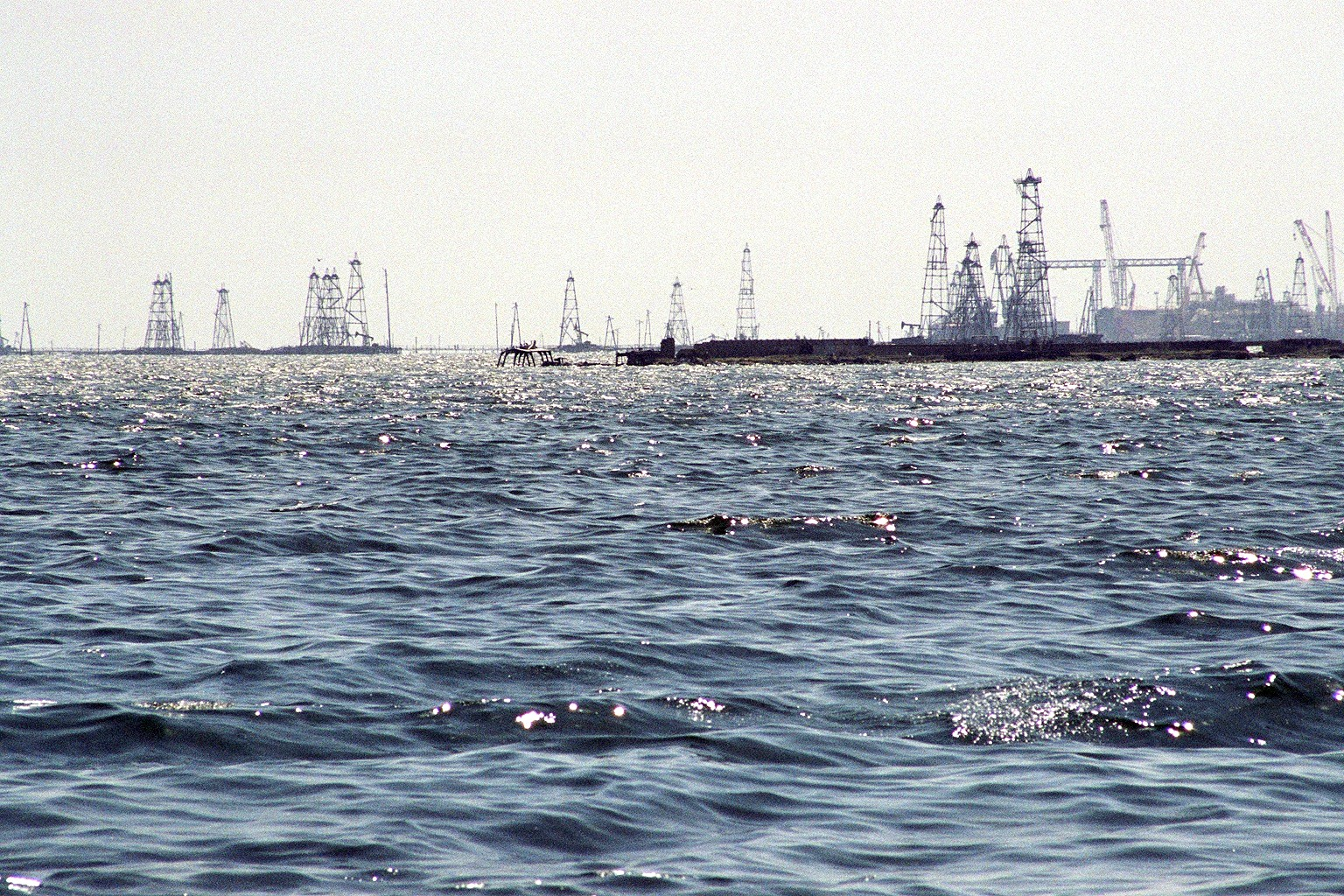
Azerbaijan is among the fastest growing economies in Europe, in part due to the country's growing energy sector.

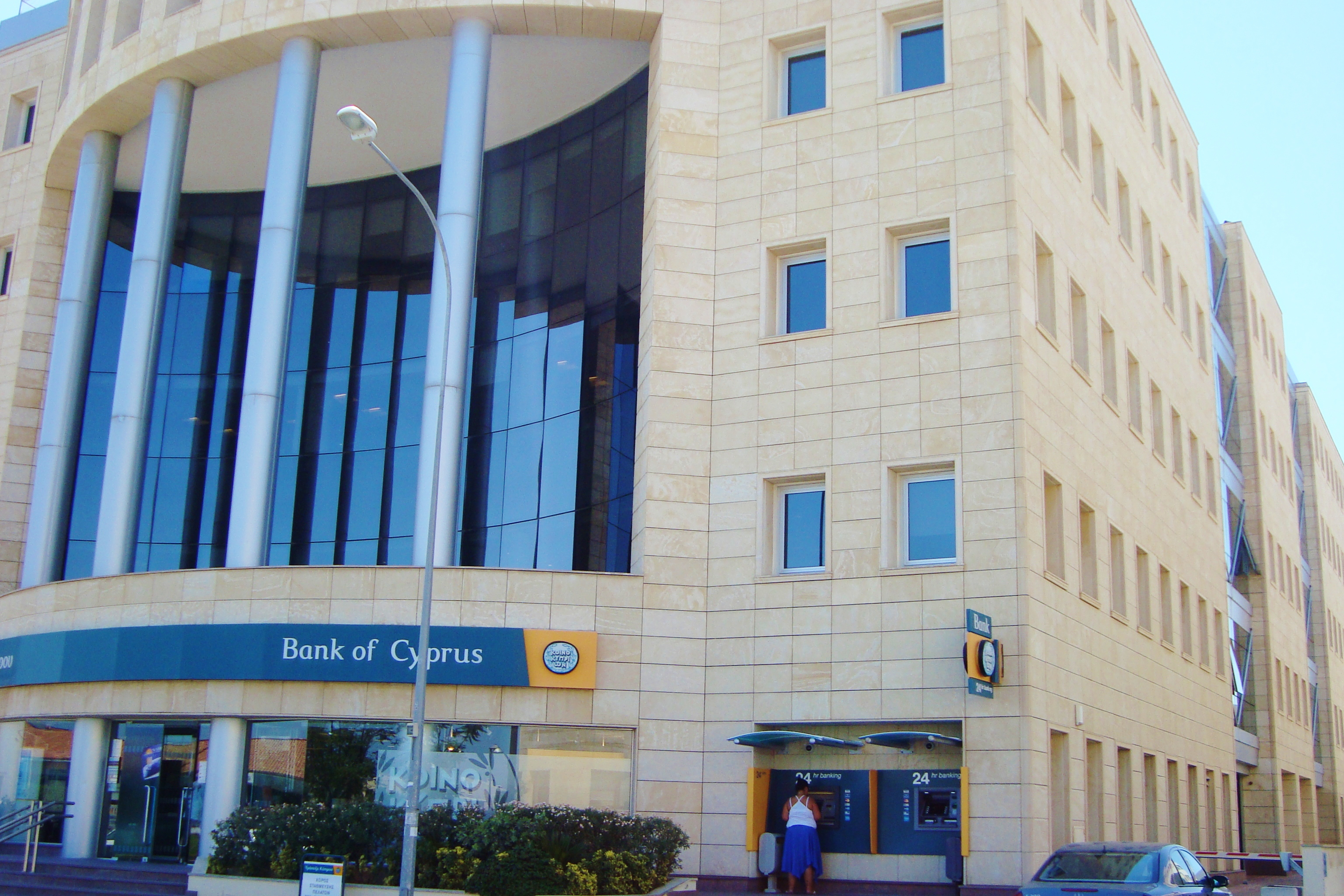
The economy of Cyprus continues to struggle as a result of the ongoing eurozone crisis and the resulting Cypriot financial crisis.

The real GDP growth rates provided are the 2015 estimates (unless otherwise indicated) as recorded in the CIA World Factbook.

Rank	Country	Real GDP growth rate (%)
1	Monaco	9.30 (2013 est.)
2	Ireland	7.80
3	Malta	5.40
4	Luxembourg	4.50
5	Czech Republic	4.20
6	Montenegro	4.10
7	Sweden	4.10
8	Iceland	4.00
9	Vatican City	3.80
10	Romania	3.70
11	North Macedonia	3.70
12	Slovakia	3.60
13	Poland	3.60
14	Spain	3.20
15	Armenia	3.00
16	Bulgaria	3.00
17	Slovenia	2.90
18	Hungary	2.90
19	Bosnia and Herzegovina	2.80
20	Georgia	2.80
21	Latvia	2.70
22	Albania	2.60
23	United Kingdom	2.20
24	Netherlands	1.90
25	Liechtenstein	1.80
26	Lithuania	1.60
27	Norway	1.60
28	Cyprus	1.60
29	Croatia	1.60
30	Germany	1.50
31	Portugal	1.50
32	Belgium	1.40
33	Denmark	1.20
34	France	1.10
35	Estonia	1.10
36	Azerbaijan	1.10
37	San Marino	1.00
38	Switzerland	0.90
39	Austria	0.90
40	Italy	0.80
41	Serbia	0.70
42	Finland	0.40
43	Greece	−0.20
44	Moldova	−1.10
45	Andorra	−1.60
46	Russia	−3.70
47	Belarus	−3.90
48	Ukraine	−9.90

=== GDP (nominal) per capita of sovereign states in Europe ===
Data provided is by the IMF (2026). Data for Monaco is from 2023.

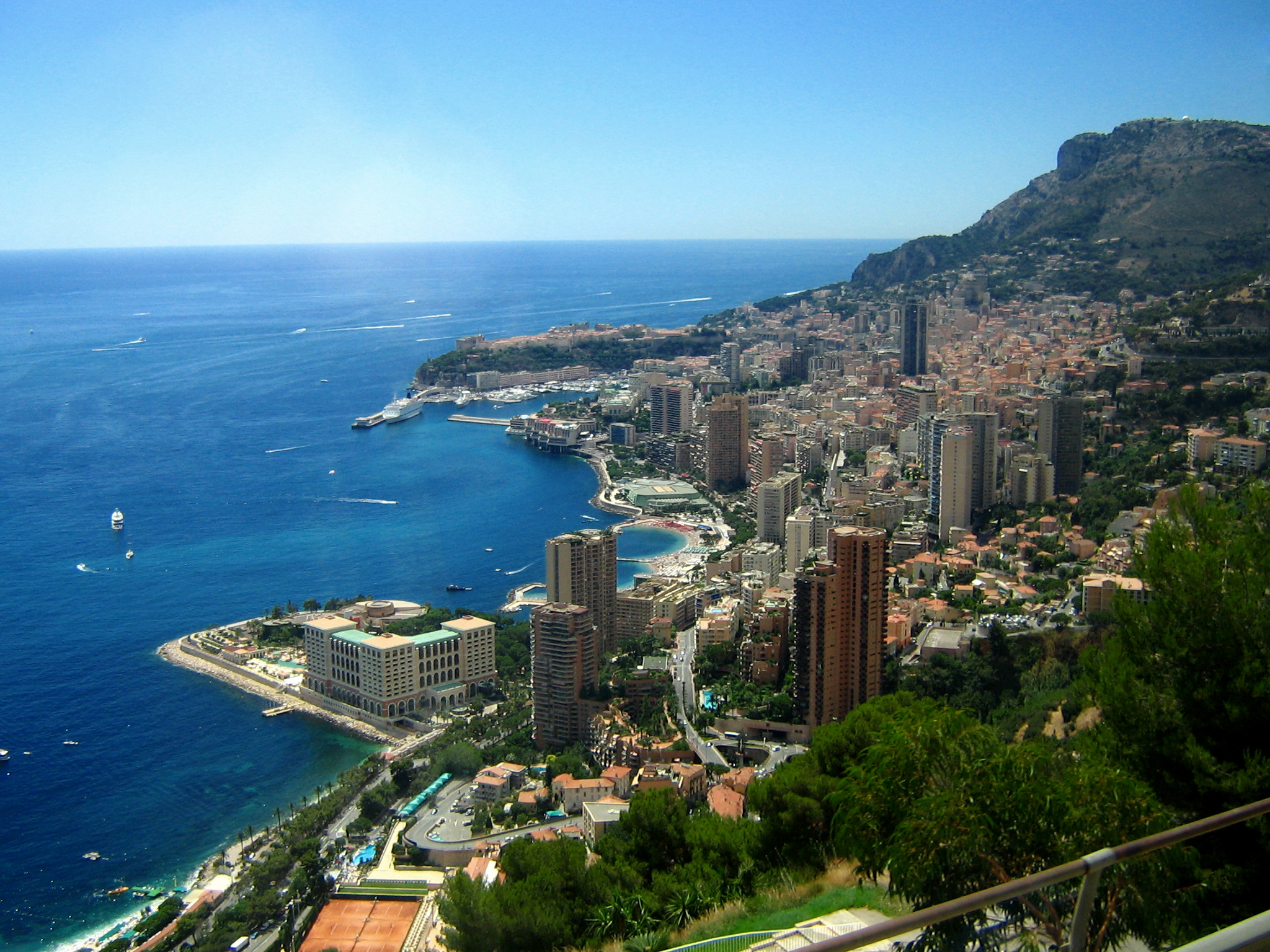
Monaco is home to one of the world's wealthiest populations, and has the highest level of GDP per capita in Europe.

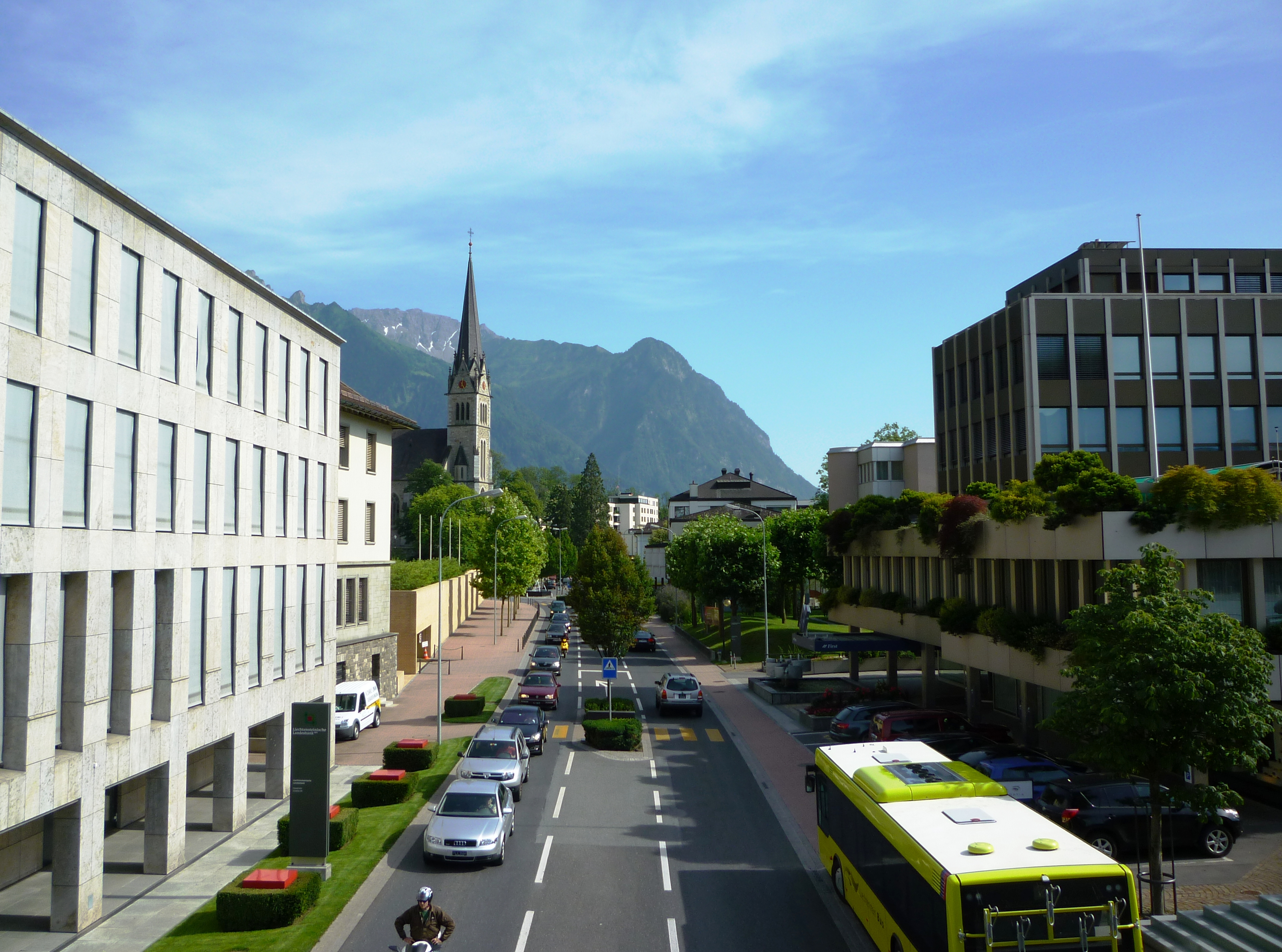
Like Monaco, the small size of Liechtenstein has led to it being among the highest ranked European states for GDP per capita.

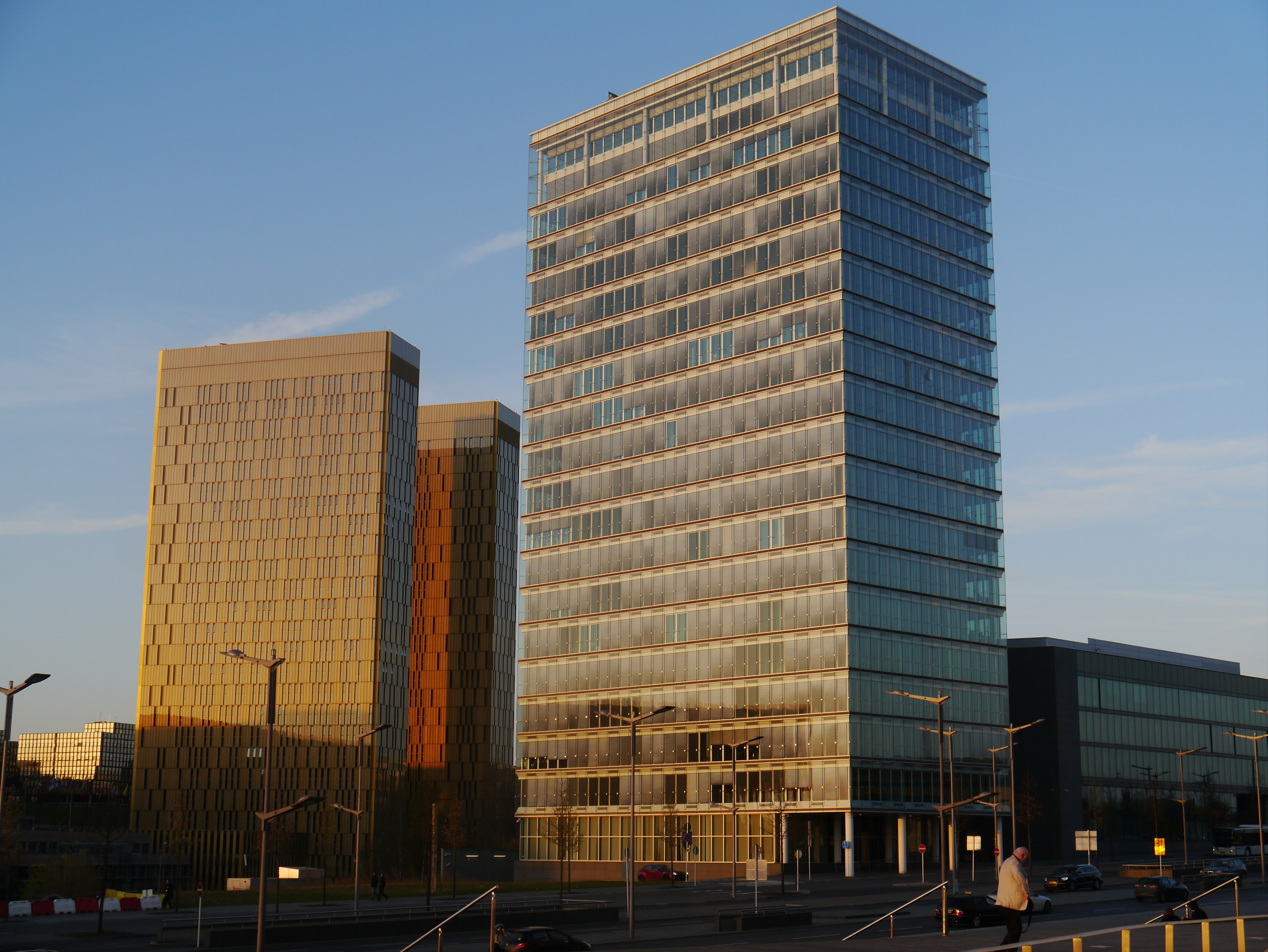
Luxembourg is home to an established financial sector as well as one of Europe's richest populations.

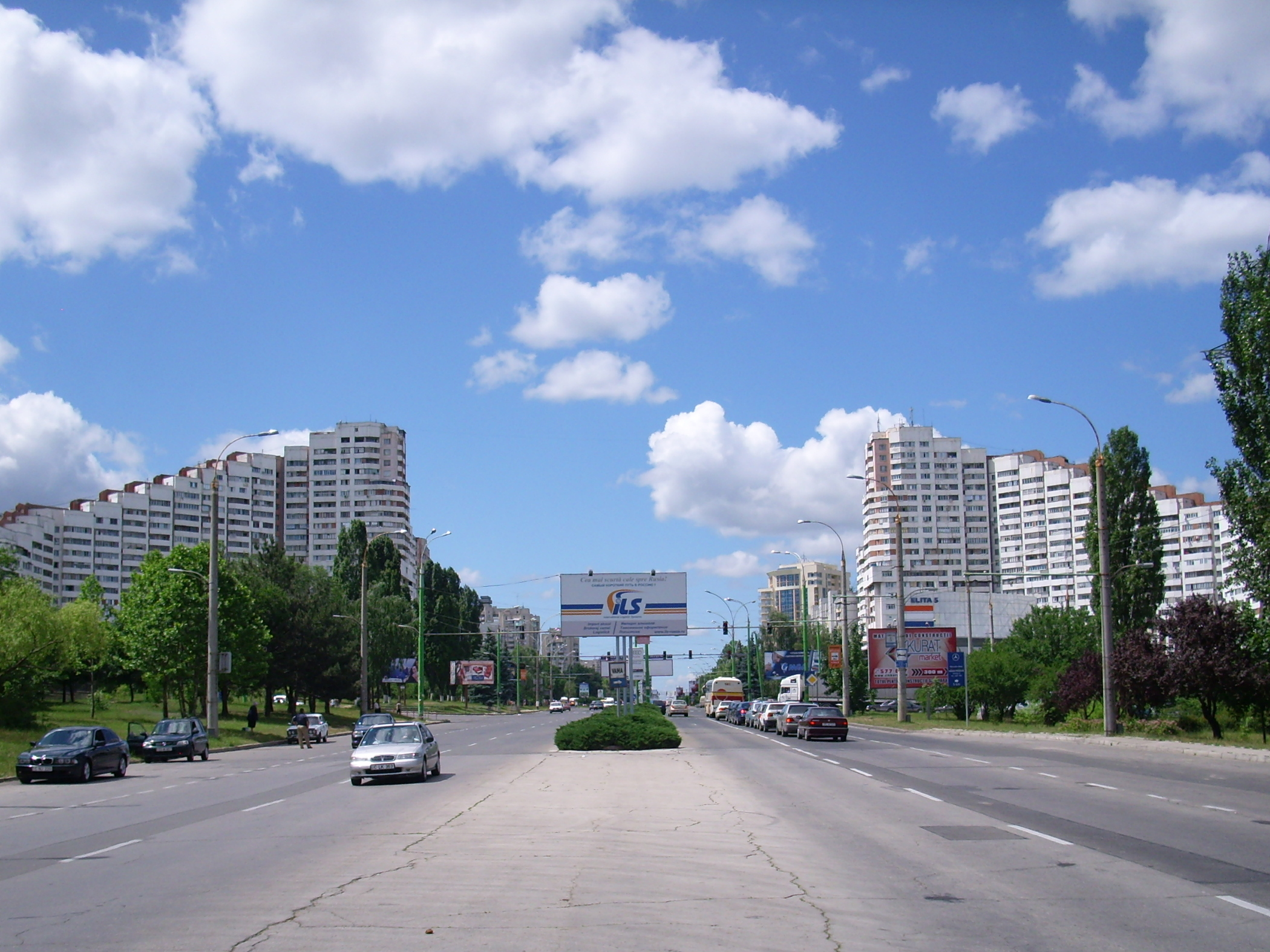
Despite having the highest GDP growth rate in Europe, Moldova is among its poorest states, and also has Europe's smallest GDP per capita.

Rank in Europe	Country	US$
1	Monaco	288,688
2	Liechtenstein	226,809
3	Luxembourg	158,733
4	Ireland	140,186
5	Switzerland	126,177
6	Iceland	110,048
7	Norway	105,877
8	Denmark	83,445
9	Netherlands	79,918
10	Sweden	70,676
11	San Marino	70,187
12	Germany	68,755
13	Austria	67,761
14	Belgium	65,112
15	United Kingdom	61,056
16	Finland	60,130
17	France	56,069
18	Malta	53,560
19	Andorra	53,474
20	Italy	46,505
21	Cyprus	45,409
22	Spain	41,563
23	Slovenia	40,630
24	Czech Republic	39,795
25	Estonia	37,718
26	Lithuania	36,545
27	Portugal	35,433
28	Poland	31,336
29	Slovakia	31,242
30	Croatia	30,030
31	Greece	29,696
32	Latvia	28,913
33	Hungary	28,430
34	Romania	25,693
35	Bulgaria	23,848
36	Turkey	19,018
37	Russia	18,526
38	Serbia	17,252
39	Montenegro	16,377
—	World	14,217
40	Albania	12,493
41	North Macedonia	11,967
42	Belarus	11,285
43	Bosnia and Herzegovina	10,701
44	Moldova	9,354
45	Kosovo	8,958
46	Ukraine	6,980

=== GDP purchasing power parity (PPP) ===
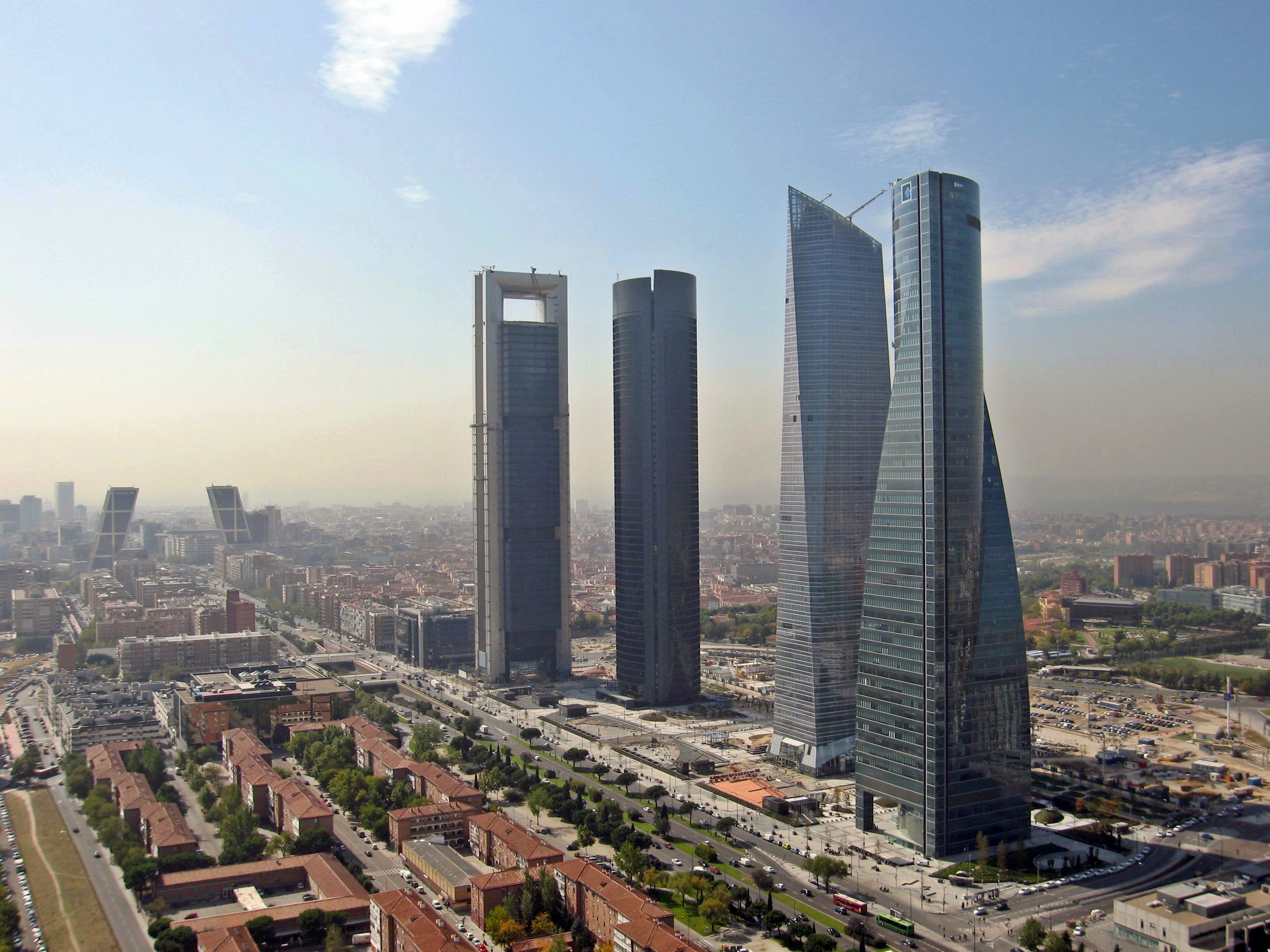
Madrid is the financial capital of Spain, and one of the most important financial centres in Europe.

Data provided is by the International Monetary Fund (2018)

Rank	Country	GDP (billions of US$)
1	Germany	4,342.9
2	Russia	4,227.4
3	France	3,040.4
4	United Kingdom	3,038.8
5	Italy	2,399.7
6	Spain	1,865.9
7	Poland	1,215.4
8	Switzerland	551.5
9	Belgium	550.8
10	Sweden	548.8
11	Romania	516.3
13	Austria	463.5
14	Czech Republic	396.1
15	Norway	395.8
16	Ukraine	390.4
17	Ireland	389.0
18	Portugal	333.1
19	Greece	312.2
20	Hungary	312.0
21	Denmark	302.2
22	Finland	256.8
23	Slovakia	191.2
24	Belarus	189.2
25	Azerbaijan	179.1
26	Bulgaria	162.1
27	Serbia	122.7
28	Croatia	107.3
29	Lithuania	97.0
30	Slovenia	75.9
31	Luxembourg	64.0
32	Latvia	57.8
33	Bosnia and Herzegovina	52.4
34	Estonia	45.4
35	Georgia	42.6
36	Albania	38.3
37	North Macedonia	32.6
38	Cyprus	34.5
39	Armenia	30.5
40	Moldova	25.8
41	Malta	21.4
42	Iceland	19.4
43	Montenegro	11.9
44	Monaco	5.74 (2011 est.) (Note: As data by the IMF is unavailable, the latest available data by the CIA World Factbook is used.)
45	Liechtenstein	3.20 (2009 est.)
46	Andorra	3.16 (2012 est.)
47	San Marino	2.01

== European countries by total wealth ==
List by Credit Suisse (2018)
Rank	Country	Total wealth (billions USD)
	Europe	85,402
	European Union	77,821
1	Germany	14,499
2	United Kingdom	14,209
3	France	13,883
4	Italy	10,569
5	Spain	7,152
6	Switzerland	3,611
7	Netherlands	3,357
8	Belgium	2,776
9	Russia	2,240
10	Sweden	1,920
11	Austria	1,637
12	Denmark	1,276
13	Norway	1,181
14	Greece	975
15	Poland	974
16	Portugal	916
17	Ireland	806
18	Finland	697
19	Czech Republic	524
20	Romania	317
21	Hungary	294
22	Luxembourg	188
23	Slovakia	151
24	Bulgaria	138
25	Iceland	138
26	Slovenia	133
27	Croatia	120
28	Cyprus	91
29	Serbia	73
30	Estonia	60
31	Lithuania	57
32	Ukraine	55
33	Latvia	53
34	Malta	49
35	Bosnia and Herzegovina	40
36	Albania	37
37	North Macedonia	20
38	Montenegro	12
39	Belarus	11

== Financial ==
=== Current account balance ===
The current account balance values provided are the 2013 figures (unless otherwise indicated) as recorded in the CIA World Factbook. Figures for Andorra, Liechtenstein, Monaco and San Marino are unavailable.

Rank	Country	Current account balance (US$)
1	Germany	257,100,000,000
2	Russia	74,800,000,000 (2012 est.)
3	Norway	67,400,000,000
4	Netherlands	65,870,000,000
5	Switzerland	65,600,000,000
6	Sweden	39,000,000,000
7	Denmark	19,600,000,000
8	Azerbaijan	13,280,000,000
9	Austria	10,600,000,000
10	Ireland	7,300,000,000
11	Slovakia	3,315,000,000
12	Slovenia	2,954,000,000
13	Luxembourg	2,700,000,000
14	Spain	2,100,000,000
15	Greece	2,021,000,000
16	Hungary	1,722,000,000
17	Portugal	1,000,000,000
18	Malta	133,100,000
19	Iceland	−100,000,000
20	Croatia	−102,300,000
21	Bulgaria	−182,300,000
22	North Macedonia	−194,100,000
23	Estonia	−352,300,000
24	Cyprus	−358,200,000
25	Moldova	−507,700,000
26	Lithuania	−567,000,000
27	Latvia	−613,900,000
28	Armenia	−720,600,000
29	Bosnia and Herzegovina	−939,500,000
30	Albania	−1,280,000,000
31	Georgia	−1,375,000,000
32	Serbia	−1,807,000,000
33	Montenegro	−1,938,000,000 (2012 est.)
34	Romania	−1,986,000,000
35	Finland	−2,000,000,000
36	Italy	−2,400,000,000
37	Czech Republic	−3,270,000,000
38	Belarus	−4,245,000,000
39	Belgium	−9,100,000,000
40	Poland	−11,060,000,000
41	Ukraine	−11,920,000,000
42	France	−58,970,000,000
43	United Kingdom	-93,600,000,000

=== Public debt ===
The public debt values provided are the 2013 figures (unless otherwise indicated) as recorded in the CIA World Factbook. Figures for Liechtenstein and Monaco are unavailable.

Rank	Country	Public debt (% of GDP)
1	Greece	175.00
2	Italy	133.00
3	Iceland	130.50
4	Portugal	127.80
5	Cyprus	113.10
6	Belgium	102.40
7	Spain	93.70
8	France	93.40
9	United Kingdom	91.10
10	Germany	79.90
11	Hungary	79.80
12	Austria	75.70
13	Malta	75.30
14	Netherlands	74.30
15	Slovenia	71.70
16	Albania	70.50
17	Croatia	66.20
18	Ireland	64.80 (2019)
19	Serbia	61.20
20	Finland	56.50
21	Slovakia	55.50
22	Montenegro	52.10 (2012 est.)
23	Czech Republic	48.80
24	Poland	48.20
25	Denmark	47.00
26	Bosnia and Herzegovina	45.90
27	Sweden	41.50
28	Andorra	41.10 (2012)
29	Ukraine	40.60
30	Lithuania	40.20
31	Latvia	39.20
32	Romania	38.60
33	Armenia	37.70
34	Liechtenstein	36.60
35	Georgia	36.30 (2012 est.)
36	North Macedonia	34.30
37	Switzerland	33.80
38	Belarus	31.50
39	Norway	30.10
40	San Marino	25.80
41	Luxembourg	22.90
42	Bulgaria	18.40
43	Moldova	16.60
44	Russia	7.90
45	Azerbaijan	7.50
46	Estonia	6.00

=== Unemployment rate ===
The unemployment rate values provided are the most recent figures provided by varying sources, namely data released by governments.

Rank	Country	Unemployment rate (%)
1	Monaco	0.1 (2013) (Note: Data for Belarusian unemployment does not take into account underemployment.)
2	Belarus	0.5 (2020)
3	Czech Republic	2.7 (2020)
4	Poland	3.2 (2020)
5	Malta	4.1 (2020)
6	Bulgaria	4.4 (2020)
7	Germany	4.4 (2020)
8	Netherlands	4.5 (2020) (Note: Data for Austrian unemployment includes only those who were previously employed.)
9	Slovenia	4.7 (2020)
10	Hungary	4.9 (2020)
11	Ireland	5 (2020)
12	Austria	5.2 (2020)
13	Romania	5.4 (2020)
14	Belgium	5.5 (2020)
15	Denmark	6 (2020)
16	Slovakia	6.8 (2020)
17	France	6.9 (2020)
18	Cyprus	6.9 (2020)
19	Luxembourg	7.3 (2020)
20	Finland	7.8 (2020)
21	Estonia	8 (2020)
22	Portugal	8.1 (2020)
23	Croatia	8.6 (2020)
24	Latvia	9 (2020)
25	Lithuania	9 (2020)
26	Sweden	9.4 (2020)
27	Italy	9.7 (2020)
28	Spain	10.8 (2025)
29	Greece	18.3 (2020)

=== Average wage ===
The average wage values provided are 2018 figures (unless otherwise stated) as recorded by varying sources, namely releases by respective Governments. The values are for monthly average wage (annual wage divided by 12 months) for net income (after taxes) in Euro currency.

Rank	Country	Net wage (Euro €)
1	Liechtenstein	4,887
2	Switzerland	4,502
3	Monaco	4,300
4	Iceland	3,568
5	Luxembourg	3,416
6	Norway	3,395
7	Denmark	3,270
8	France	2,634
9	United Kingdom	2,583
10	Ireland	2,525
11	Finland	2,509
12	Sweden	2,458
13	Germany	2,409
14	San Marino	2,390
15	Austria	2,324
16	Andorra	2,230
17	Netherlands	2,152
18	Belgium	1,920
19	Italy	1,758
20	Spain	1,749
21	Cyprus	1,658
22	Estonia	1,105
23	Slovenia	1,083
24	Malta	1,021
25	Czechia	932
26	Portugal	925
27	Greece	890
28	Slovakia	862
29	Poland	793
30	Latvia	755
31	Lithuania	722
32	Hungary	701
33	Romania	589
34	Bulgaria	583
35	Serbia	565
36	Montenegro	512
37	Bosnia and Herzegovina	510
38	North Macedonia	473
39	Russia	454
40	Albania	393
41	Belarus	348
42	Moldova	242
43	Ukraine	228

=== Minimum wage ===
The minimum wage figures provided are the 2018 figures by The Federation of International Employers. Currency conversions from non-Euro currencies being based on the exchange rates of 2018.

Rank	Country	Monthly minimum (euro)
1	Luxembourg	2,049
2	San Marino	1,832
3	Austria	1,750 (2020)
4	Monaco	1,732
5	Netherlands	1,578
6	Belgium	1,563
7	Ireland	1,563
8	Germany	1,498
9	France	1,458
10	United Kingdom	1,413
11	Spain	1,050
12	Andorra	991
13	Slovenia	886
14	Malta	761
15	Portugal	700
16	Greece	683
17	Lithuania	555
18	Estonia	540
19	Poland	524
20	Slovakia	480
21	Czechia	477
22	Croatia	462
23	Hungary	445
24	Latvia	430
25	Romania	407
26	Albania	300
27	Serbia	276
28	Bulgaria	260
29	North Macedonia	239
30	Bosnia and Herzegovina	207
31	Montenegro	193
32	Russia	139
33	Ukraine	128
34	Belarus	125
35	Moldova	124

== Social ==
=== Human Development Index ===
The Human Development Index values provided are the 2018 estimates for 2017, as included in the United Nations Development Programme's Human Development Report.

Rank	Country	HDI	Change
1	Norway	0.953	▲0.002
2	Switzerland	0.944	▲0.001
3	Ireland	0.938	▲0.004
4	Germany	0.936	▲0.002
5	Iceland	0.935	▲0.002
6	Sweden	0.933	▲0.001
7	Netherlands	0.931	▲0.003
8	Denmark	0.929	▲0.001
9	United Kingdom	0.922	▲0.002
10	Finland	0.920	▲0.002
11	Belgium	0.916	▲0.001
12	Liechtenstein	0.916	▲0.001
13	Austria	0.908	▲0.002
14	Luxembourg	0.904	▲0.001
15	France	0.901	▲0.002
16	Slovenia	0.896	▲0.002
17	Spain	0.891	▲0.002
18	Czech Republic	0.888	▲0.003
19	Italy	0.880	▲0.002
20	Malta	0.878	▲0.003
21	Estonia	0.871	▲0.003
22	Greece	0.870	▲0.002
23	Cyprus	0.869	▲0.002
24	Poland	0.865	▲0.005
25	Andorra	0.858	▲0.002
26	Lithuania	0.858	▲0.003
27	Slovakia	0.855	▲0.002
28	Latvia	0.847	▲0.003
29	Portugal	0.847	▲0.002
30	Hungary	0.838	▲0.003
31	Croatia	0.831	▲0.003
32	Russia	0.816	▲0.001
33	Montenegro	0.814	▲0.004
34	Bulgaria	0.813	▲0.003
35	Romania	0.811	▲0.004
36	Belarus	0.808	▲0.003
37	Turkey	0.806	▲0.004
38	Serbia	0.787	▲0.002
39	Albania	0.785	▲0.003
40	Bosnia and Herzegovina	0.780	▲0.002
41	Georgia	0.780	▲0.004
42	Azerbaijan	0.757	Steady
43	North Macedonia	0.757	▲0.001
44	Armenia	0.755	▲0.006
45	Ukraine	0.752	▲0.005
46	Moldova	0.700	▲0.003

=== Percentage living below poverty line ===
The percentage figures for citizens living below the poverty line are provided by either the CIA World Factbook (2007) or the World Bank (2012) There is no data available for eleven European states.

Rank	Country	Percentage	Year
1	Lithuania	4.0	2008
2	Norway	4.3	2007
3	Ireland	5.5	2009
4	Latvia	5.9	2004
5	Austria	6.0	2008
5	Azerbaijan	6.0	2012
7	France	6.2	2004
8	Switzerland	6.9	2010
9	Belarus	7.3	2011
10	Poland	7.6	2008
11	Ukraine	7.8	2011
12	Czech Republic	8.6	2012
13	Serbia	9.1	2013
14	Netherlands	10.5	2005
15	Montenegro	11.3	2012
16	Slovenia	12.3	2008
17	Russia	12.7	2011
18	Slovakia	13.2	2011
19	Denmark	13.4	2011
20	Hungary	13.9	2010
21	United Kingdom	14.0	2006
22	Belgium	15.2	2007
23	Germany	15.5	2010
24	Moldova	16.6	2012
25	Turkey	16.9	2010
26	Estonia	17.5	2010
27	Georgia	17.7	2011
28	Bosnia and Herzegovina	17.9	2011
29	Croatia	18.0	2009
30	Portugal	18.0	2006
31	Spain	19.8	2005
32	Greece	20.0	2009
33	Bulgaria	20.7	2009
34	North Macedonia	21.1	2010
35	Romania	22.2	2011
35	Albania	22.2	2023
37	Armenia	34.1	2009

=== Social Progress Index ===
The Social Progress Index figures are provided by the nonprofit Social Progress Imperative and represent 2014. Eight European states are not represented as data is not available.

Rank	Country	Social Progress Index
1	Switzerland	88.19
2	Iceland	88.07
3	Netherlands	87.37
4	Norway	87.12
5	Sweden	87.08
6	Finland	86.91
7	Denmark	86.55
8	Austria	85.11
9	Germany	84.61
10	United Kingdom	84.56
11	Ireland	84.05
12	Belgium	82.63
13	Slovenia	81.65
14	Estonia	81.65
15	France	81.10
16	Spain	80.77
17	Portugal	80.49
18	Czech Republic	80.41
19	Slovakia	78.93
20	Poland	77.44
21	Italy	76.93
22	Latvia	73.91
23	Hungary	73.87
24	Lithuania	73.76
25	Greece	73.43
26	Croatia	73.31
27	Serbia	70.61
28	Bulgaria	70.24
29	Albania	69.13
30	North Macedonia	68.33
31	Romania	67.72
32	Montenegro	66.80
33	Belarus	65.20
34	Armenia	65.03
35	Bosnia and Herzegovina	64.99
36	Ukraine	64.91
37	Turkey	64.62
38	Georgia	63.94
39	Azerbaijan	62.44
40	Russia	60.79
41	Moldova	60.12

=== Opportunity ===
The Opportunity figures are included in the 2014 Social Progress Index by the nonprofit Social Progress Imperative. Eight European states are not represented as data is not available.

Rank	Country	Opportunity
1	Ireland	82.63
2	United Kingdom	82.29
3	Sweden	81.95
4	Finland	81.92
5	Iceland	81.71
6	Norway	80.82
7	Netherlands	80.63
8	Switzerland	79.92
9	Denmark	79.10
10	Belgium	76.34
11	Germany	75.81
12	Spain	75.19
13	Portugal	74.43
14	Austria	74.42
15	France	72.72
16	Estonia	72.32
17	Slovenia	69.3
18	Italy	66.58
19	Poland	66.50
20	Czech Republic	66.21
21	Hungary	63.46
22	Slovakia	63.04
23	Lithuania	61.84
24	Latvia	59.85
25	Greece	58.45
26	Bulgaria	56.98
27	Ukraine	55.33
28	North Macedonia	55.23
29	Romania	54.91
30	Croatia	54.88
31	Albania	54.14
32	Serbia	52.87
33	Montenegro	52.48
34	Georgia	49.07
35	Moldova	48.04
36	Turkey	47.41
37	Armenia	47.39
38	Bosnia and Herzegovina	46.93
39	Russia	46.58
40	Belarus	44.13
41	Azerbaijan	42.54

=== World Happiness Report ===
The World Happiness Report is a measure of happiness published by the United Nations Sustainable Development Solutions Network, with the figures provided being the 2013 edition for the 2010 to 2012 period.

Rank	Country	Happiness	Change in happiness (2005-2006)
1	Finland	7.693	▼ −0.233
2	Norway	7.655	▲0.263
3	Switzerland	7.650	▲0.303
4	Netherlands	7.512	▲0.054
5	Sweden	7.480	▲0.171
7	Austria	7.369	▲0.247
8	Iceland	7.355	N/A
9	Ireland	7.076	▼ −0.068
10	Luxembourg	7.054	N/A
11	Belgium	6.967	▼ −0.274
12	United Kingdom	6.883	▼ −0.003
13	France	6.764	▼ −0.049
14	Germany	6.672	▲0.163
15	Cyprus	6.466	▲0.228
16	Spain	6.322	▼ −0.750
17	Czech Republic	6.290	▼ −0.180
18	Slovenia	6.060	▲0.249
19	Italy	6.021	▼ −0.691
20	Slovakia	5.969	▲0.705
21	Malta	5.964	N/A
22	Poland	5.822	▲0.085
23	Moldova	5.791	▲0.852
24	Croatia	5.661	▼ −0.160
25	Albania	5.550	▲0.915
26	Belarus	5.504	▼ −0.133
27	Russia	5.464	▲0.346
28	Greece	5.435	▼ −0.891
29	Lithuania	5.426	▼ −0.456
30	Estonia	5.426	▲0.074
31	Turkey	5.344	▲0.171
32	Montenegro	5.299	▲0.103
33	Portugal	5.101	▼ −0.305
34	Ukraine	5.057	▲0.032
35	Latvia	5.046	▲0.358
36	Romania	5.033	▼ −0.186
37	Bulgaria	4.981	▲0.137
38	Serbia	4.813	▲0.063
39	Bosnia and Herzegovina	4.813	▼ −0.087
40	Hungary	4.775	▼ −0.300
41	Azerbaijan	4.604	▼ −0.045
42	North Macedonia	4.574	▲0.081
43	Armenia	4.316	▼ −0.269
44	Georgia	4.187	▲0.496

== Summary ==
=== Economic ===
- Azerbaijan is the second fastest growing economy in Europe, and the fastest growing transcontinental economy.
- France has the highest net national wealth of any European state.
- Germany is the current largest economy in Europe, the European Union and the eurozone.
- Latvia is the fastest growing economy in both the eurozone and the European Union.
- Luxembourg is home to the highest GDP (nominal) per capita in both the European Union and eurozone.
- Malta is the smallest economy in the eurozone as well as the European Union, and is the fastest growing European economy in the Commonwealth of Nations.
- Moldova is the fastest growing economy in Europe, but is also one of Europe's poorest countries, with the lowest GDP (nominal) per capita of any European state.
- Monaco has the highest GDP (nominal) per capita of any European state.
- Russia is the largest transcontinental European economy and will remain so until at least 2030.
- San Marino is Europe's smallest economy, and is also the third weakest growing economy in Europe.
- United Kingdom is the largest non-eurozone economy in Europe.

=== Financial ===
- Austria has the lowest unemployment rate in the European Union and the eurozone.
- Belarus has the lowest unemployment rate in Europe, although this figure includes underemployment.
- Bulgaria has the smallest average wage and monthly minimum wage in the European Union.
- Estonia has the smallest public debt (as a percentage of GDP) of any state in Europe, as well as in the European Union and eurozone.
- France has the largest financial deficit of any state in the eurozone.
- Georgia has the lowest monthly minimum wage in Europe.
- Germany has the largest financial surplus of any country in Europe as well as the remainder of the world.
- Greece has the highest public debt (as a percentage of GDP) of any European state.
- North Macedonia has the highest unemployment rate of any European state.
- Liechtenstein has the highest average wage of any state in Europe.
- Lithuania has the smallest average wage and monthly minimum wage in the eurozone.
- Luxembourg has the highest average wage in the European Union and eurozone as well as the highest monthly minimum wage in the entirety of Europe.
- Russia has the largest surplus of those European countries not a member of either (or both) the EU or eurozone.
- Ukraine has the smallest average wage in Europe, mostly as a result of the ongoing war.
- United Kingdom has the largest deficit of any country in Europe and the European Union.

=== Social ===
- Albania has the largest percentage living under the poverty line of any state in Europe.
- Armenia has the highest Change in Happiness of any state in Europe.
- Azerbaijan has the smallest rating for Opportunity in Europe.
- Croatia has the smallest rating for Opportunity in the European Union.
- Denmark ranks highest on the World Happiness Report in Europe and the European Union.
- Ireland has the highest rating for Opportunity in Europe, the European Union and the eurozone.
- Latvia has the weakest Human Development Index and World Happiness Index figures in the eurozone.
- Lithuania has the smallest percentage living below the poverty line in Europe.
- Moldova ranks lowest on the Human Development Index and Social Progress Index in Europe.
- Netherlands has highest Human Development Index figure in the European Union and the eurozone, and also ranks first in the EU and eurozone on the Social Progress Index, as well as being the highest ranked country in the eurozone on the World Happiness Index.
- San Marino has the highest Human Development Index figure in Europe.
- Switzerland ranks highest in Europe on the Social Progress Index.

== See also ==
- List of countries by wealth per adult
