= Economy of Korea =

Economy of Korea may refer to:

- Economy of South Korea
- Economy of North Korea
