= Seychelles Blue Bond =

2018 bond to finance ocean conservation

The Seychelles blue bond was the first sovereign bond issued specifically to finance marine conservation and sustainable development as part of the blue economy. It was issued by the government of Seychelles on 29 October 2018, and raised US$15 million. The proceeds from the bond were used to support the expansion of marine protected areas, the improving fisheries management, promotion of sustainable tourism and the development of climate-resilient coastal communities

== Background ==
The Seychelles is a small island country in the Indian Ocean. It is a popular tourist destination with an economy that is heavily dependent on the ocean. In Seychelles, the fisheries sector employs 17% of the population and contributes 20% to GDP

The Seychelles is also vulnerable to climate change as rising sea levels and ocean acidification continues to threaten coastal communities and marine ecosystems.

== Bond ==
The Seychelles blue bond is a 10-year bond with a coupon of 6.5%. It was issued through a private placement to three impact investors: Calvert Impact Capital, Nuveen and Prudential.

The bond was initiated with a US$5million guarantee from the World Bank. In addition, the World Bank provided a US$5million concessional loan to help cover the interest payments on the bond

== Proceeds ==
The proceeds from the bond were used to support a number of projects including

1. The expansion of marine protected areas through a committed effort by the government of Seychelles to increase the protected Exclusive economic zone to 30% by 2020.
2. The improvement of fisheries management by funding the development of new fisheries management tools
3. The development of new infrastructure to improve climate resilience and the implementation of climate adaptation measures.

== Impact ==
The Seychelles Blue Bond was a success and has inspired the issuance of other blue bonds by countries such as Belize, Palau and Tonga.
