= Seychelles Port Authority =

Government agency of Seychelles

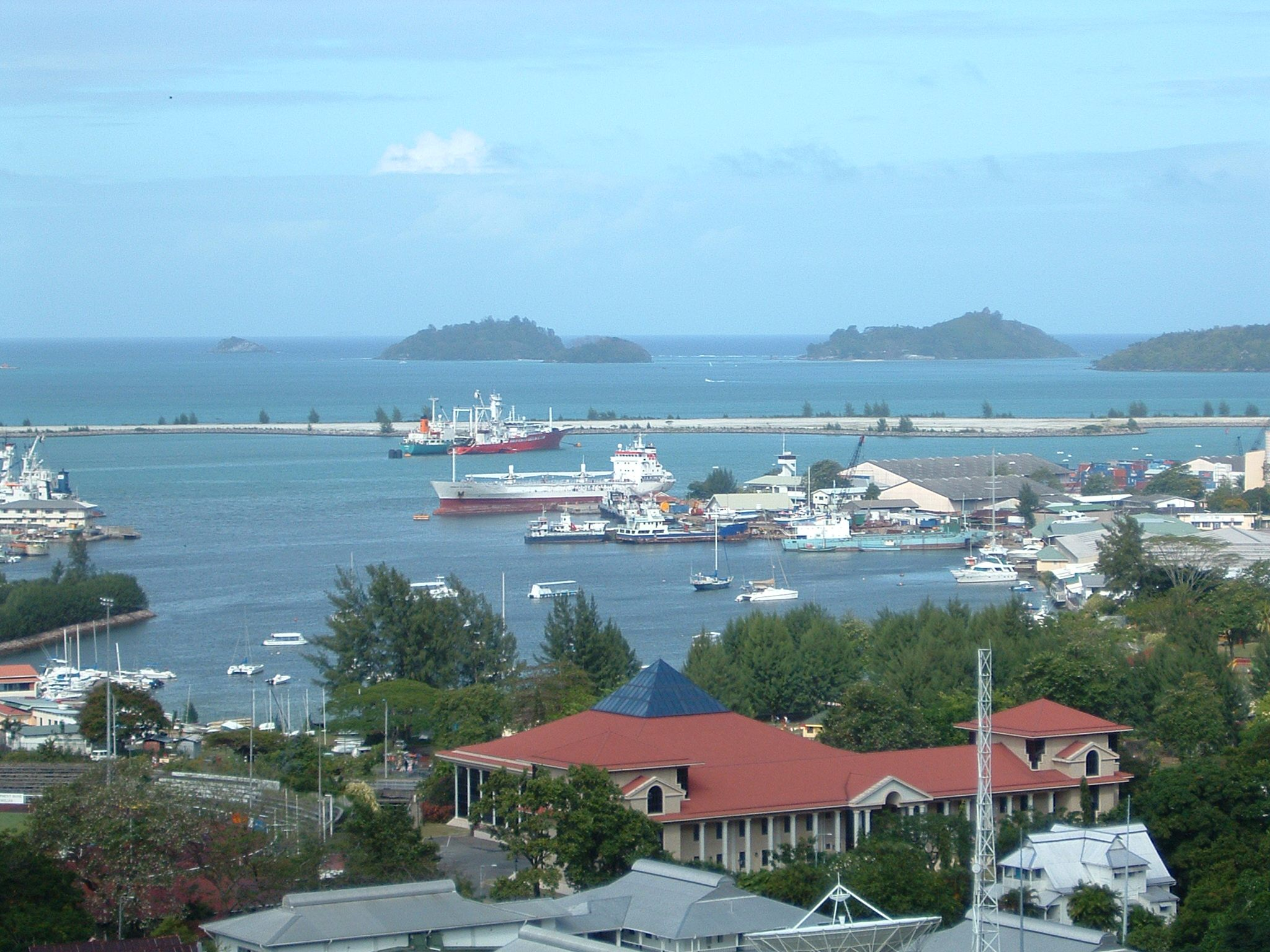
Victoria Harbor

Seychelles Port Authority (SPA) is a government agency of Seychelles, created by the Seychelles Ports Authority Act 2004, that governs and operates the ports of the country, principally the Port of Victoria.

== History ==
The SPA was formerly known as the Ports and Marine Services Division (of the Seychelles' Ministry of Transport). Seychelles is an archipelago country in the western region of the Indian Ocean, and its ports handle both cargo and pleasure boat trade. The Authority is located in Victoria.

== See also ==
- Government of Seychelles
- Transport in Seychelles
