= Seychelles Revenue Commission =

Government agency in Seychelles

Seychelles Revenue Commission (SRC)
Agency overview
- Formed: 2009
- Jurisdiction: Government of Seychelles
- Headquarters: Victoria, Seychelles
- Agency executives: Chrystold Chetty, Chairperson; Varsha Singh, Commissioner General
- Parent department: Ministry of Finance, National Planning and Trade
- Website: src.gov.sc

The Seychelles Revenue Commission (SRC) is the primary governmental body responsible for the administration, collection, and enforcement of revenue laws in Seychelles.

== History ==
SRC was established in 2009 by replacing the previous Department of Customs and the Department of Inland Revenue. It operates under the Ministry of Finance, National Planning and Trade.

It is organized into three primary divisions: Domestic Tax, Customs, and Support Services. Each division is led by an Assistant Commissioner, ensuring effective oversight and management of their respective areas.
