= Vanoil Energy =

Oil exploration corporation

Vanoil Energy Ltd.
- Traded as: TSX-V:VEL; OTCX:VNLEF
- Industry: Hydrocarbon exploration
- Founded: 3 September 2009
- Headquarters: Vancouver, British Columbia, Canada
- Key people: James Passin, CEO (2011-2012); Aaron D'Este, CEO (2012-2013); Sam Malin, CEO (2013-14); Don Padgett, CEO (2014-)
- Subsidiaries: Avana Petroleum
- Website: www.vanoilenergy.com

Vanoil Energy is a multinational corporation that was active in oil exploration in Kenya and Rwanda but headquartered in Vancouver, British Columbia. The company was founded in September 2009 as a spin off of Vangold Resources' oil and gas assets, which at the time consisted of exploration and evaluation rights in Kenya and Rwanda and a farmout agreement on a well in Alberta, though the farmout agreement expired in 2011. The company pursued seismic exploration activities in both Kenya and Rwanda with funds received through stock offerings. Vanoil's involvement in Rwanda ended in 2013 with the expiry of their exploration and evaluation contract with the Rwanda government. After Kenya refused to extend its agreements with Vanoil's after they expired Vanoil entered in international arbitration in 2014 seeking compensation for losses However, on 1 October 2014, Vanoil announced that it had commenced international arbitration against the Government of Kenya.

The company had been listed on the TSX Venture Exchange since its founding with Vangold shareholders receiving an equivalent share of Vanoil and with hedge fund Firebird Global Fund being its largest shareholder. In 2012, the company incorporated Vanoil Energy Holdings Ltd. and Vanoil Resources Ltd. as subsidiaries in the British Virgin Islands to hold and operate assets. In 2013 they acquired Fluormin PLC which was listed on the Alternative Investment Market of the London Stock Exchange (LON:FLOR), the Isle of Man-based Avana Petroleum. With these companies becoming subsidiaries of Vanoil Energy Holdings, they provided the company with rights for offshore oil exploration in Kenya and Seychelles, as well as other assets. However, after losing its principal assets in Kenya, the company's shares were suspended from trading on the TSX Venture Exchange (downgraded to the NEX board for inactive companies) in 2017 and then delisted in December 2018.
