= Workboat Code Edition 3 =

The Workboat Code Edition 3
- Statutory Instrument
- Parliament of the United Kingdom
- Long title: The Safety of Small Workboats and Pilot Boats – A Code of Practice
- Citation: SI 2023/1216
- Territorial extent: United Kingdom

Dates
- Made: 7 December 2023
- Laid before Parliament: 12 December 2023
- Commencement: 13 December 2023

Other legislation
- Made under: Merchant Shipping Act 1995

Status: Current legislation

The Workboat Code Edition 3 (SI 2023/1216) (often referred to as Workboat Code 3 or WB3) is a technical code of practice published by the United Kingdom's Maritime and Coastguard Agency (MCA). It establishes the technical, safety, and operational standards for small workboats and pilot boats operating in UK waters and for UK-flagged vessels operating internationally.

The Code came into force on 13 December 2023, underpinned by the Merchant Shipping (Small Workboats and Pilot Boats) Regulations 2023 (SI 2023/1216). It replaced previous regulatory frameworks, including the "Brown Code" (1998) and Workboat Code Edition 2, consolidating them into a single statutory instrument while introducing new regulations for remotely operated unmanned vessels (ROUVs) and alternative propulsion systems.

== History and background ==
The regulation of small commercial vessels in the UK has evolved through several "colour codes" since the early 1990s. The Brown Code (The Code of Practice for the Safety of Small Workboats and Pilot Boats) was originally published in 1998 to address vessels engaged in commercial tasks such as towing, cargo transport, and pilotage, which were distinct from leisure vessels covered by the Blue and Yellow Codes.

In 2004, the MCA attempted to harmonize these standards under Marine Guidance Note 280 (MGN 280). However, the rapid expansion of the offshore wind sector and the development of high-speed Offshore Energy Service Vessels (OESVs) highlighted gaps in MGN 280, leading industry bodies to argue that the harmonized code was not fit for purpose for complex modern workboats.

This led to the development of the Workboat Code Edition 2, published in 2018, which aimed to align UK standards with international conventions such as MARPOL and the Maritime Labour Convention (MLC). Edition 3 was developed to further modernize the regulations, specifically to address the emergence of autonomous technologies and decarbonization targets.

== Aims and scope ==
The primary aim of Workboat Code Edition 3 is to provide a single, unified regulatory framework for the certification of small workboats, removing the need for operators to consult multiple historic codes depending on the age of their vessel.

Key objectives include:

- Decarbonization: Providing a regulatory framework for lithium-ion batteries and alternative fuels.
- Innovation: Establishing safety legislation for Remotely Operated Unmanned Vessels (ROUVs).
- Safety Culture: Shifting from prescriptive equipment lists to a risk-based approach through mandatory Safety Management Systems (SMS) via Annex 8.

== Education and training ==
Edition 3 introduces more rigorous training requirements for crew, primarily outlined in Table 5 of the Code.

=== Navigation and Radar ===
A major change is the requirement for the **MCA Small Ships Navigation and Radar (SSNR)** qualification. Previously, many skippers relied on RYA Yachtmaster certifications; the SSNR is now mandatory for skippers of vessels over a certain size or those operating in restricted visibility.

=== Stability Qualification ===
Skippers must now hold a formal stability qualification, typically a 1-day course focusing on the use of stability books and the risks of "free surface effect" (e.g. from water on deck or shifting cargo).

== Manning and crewing requirements ==
=== The "Second Competent Person" ===
For vessels operating in Category 2 waters, the Code clarifies the requirements for the "second competent person." This individual must be capable of assisting the Master in an emergency, including man overboard recovery and emergency navigation.

=== Fatigue and Crew Welfare ===
Under Annex 8, all operators must now document a fatigue management policy.

- Whole Body Vibration (WBV): Fast craft and pilot boats must provide individual shock-absorbent seating. Continuous monitoring of vibration exposure becomes mandatory in December 2026.

== Key provisions and changes ==
=== Remotely Operated Unmanned Vessels (ROUVs) ===
Annex 2 of the Code introduces specific standards for unmanned surface vessels. It defines roles such as the "Remote Operator" and sets requirements for Remote Operation Centres (ROCs). In August 2024, the hydrogen-powered vessel PIONEER became the first ROUV to be certified under these regulations.

=== Technical Updates and Stability ===
- Structural Stability: Adoption of the latest ISO 12217 standards. In Wales, local authorities reported that existing harbour patrol vessels failed to meet the new "swamp test" stability requirements, necessitating the procurement of new vessels costing tens of thousands of pounds.

== Implementation and industry reaction ==
=== Controversy over costs ===
The Workboat Association (WBA) initially criticized the draft code. While the MCA estimated the cost of compliance at £800,000, the WBA argued the true cost would be closer to £1 billion, citing the "knock-on" engineering costs of structural modifications required to fit larger equipment (such as heavier anchors) mandated by the new code.

=== "Grandfather Rights" and Transition ===
- New Vessels: Must comply immediately (13 December 2023).
- Existing Vessels: Must comply by their next renewal examination or by 13 December 2026. The code prohibits "partial compliance"; an operator choosing to upgrade an existing vessel must meet the new code in full.
