= List of statutory instruments of the United Kingdom, 2023 =

This is a list of statutory instruments made in the United Kingdom in the year 2023.

== 1–100 ==
Number	Title
1 (W. 1)	The A470 Trunk Road (Northbound Entry Slip Road at Taffs Well, Rhondda Cynon Taf) (Temporary Prohibition of Vehicles) Order 2023
2	The Health Protection (Coronavirus, International Travel from China) (England) Regulations 2023
3 (W. 2)	The Non-Domestic Rating (Demand Notices) (Wales) (Amendment) Regulations 2023
4	The Health Protection (Coronavirus, International Travel from China) (England) (Amendment) Regulations 2023
5	The Power to Award Degrees etc. (National Film and Television School (The)) Order 2023
6	The Rent Officers (Housing Benefit and Universal Credit Functions) (Modification) Order 2023
7	The Universal Credit (Administrative Earnings Threshold) (Amendment) Regulations 2023
8	The Air Navigation (Restriction of Flying) (Harlow) (Emergency) Regulations 2023
9	The Energy Bill Relief Scheme (Non-Standard Cases) Regulations 2023
10	The Energy Bills Support Scheme and Alternative Fuel Payment Pass-through Requirement (Northern Ireland) Regulations 2023
11	The M42 Motorway (Junction 3) (50 Miles Per Hour Speed Limit) Regulations 2023
12	The Immigration (Restrictions on Employment etc.) (Amendment) (EU Exit) Regulations 2023
13	The Council Tax and Non-Domestic Rating (Demand Notices) (England) (Amendment) Regulations 2023
14 (W. 3)	The Government of Wales Act 2006 (Budget Motions and Designated Bodies) (Amendment) Order 2023
15	The Immigration and Nationality (Fees) and Passport (Fees) (Amendment) Regulations 2023
16	The Council Tax Reduction Schemes (Prescribed Requirements) (England) (Amendment) Regulations 2023
17	The Official Controls (Northern Ireland) Regulations 2023
18	The Agricultural Holdings (Units of Production) (England) Order 2023
19	The Value Added Tax (Refund of Tax) Order 2023
20	The Police and Criminal Evidence Act 1984 (Codes of Practice) (Revision of Code A) Order 2023
21	The Public Lending Right Scheme 1982 (Commencement of Variation) Order 2023
22	The Brighton & Hove (Electoral Changes) Order 2023
23	The Malvern Hills (Electoral Changes) Order 2023
24	The Air Navigation (Restriction of Flying) (Wimbledon) Regulations 2023
25	The Air Navigation (Restriction of Flying) (Old Warden) Regulations 2023
26	The Wychavon (Electoral Changes) Order 2023
27	The Air Navigation (Restriction of Flying) (Helicopter Flight) Regulations 2023
28	The Food Supplements and Food for Specific Groups (Miscellaneous Amendments) Regulations 2023
29	The Carriers’ Liability (Amendment) Regulations 2023
30	The Carriers’ Liability (Clandestine Entrants) (Level of Penalty: Code of Practice) Order 2023
31	The Air Navigation (Restriction of Flying) (Cheltenham) Regulations 2023
32 (C. 1)	The Nationality, Immigration and Asylum Act 2002 (Commencement No. 15) Order 2023
33 (C. 2)	The Nationality and Borders Act 2022 (Commencement No. 4 and Transitional Provision) Regulations 2023
34 (C. 3)	The Immigration and Asylum Act 1999 (Commencement No. 17) Order 2023
35	The Merchant Shipping (Watercraft) Order 2023
36	The Income Tax (Indexation of Blind Person's Allowance and Married Couple's Allowance) Order 2023
37 (W. 4)	The Education (School Day and School Year) (Wales) (Amendment) Regulations 2023
38	The International Tax Enforcement (Disclosable Arrangements) Regulations 2023
39	The Air Navigation (Restriction of Flying) (Bolton) Regulations 2023
40	The A428 Black Cat to Caxton Gibbet (Correction) Order 2023
41	The Gender Recognition Reform (Scotland) Bill (Prohibition on Submission for Royal Assent) Order 2023
42 (W. 5)	The Agricultural Holdings (Units of Production) (Wales) Order 2023
43	The Energy Act 2004 (Assistance for Areas with High Distribution Costs) (Amendment) Order 2023
44 (L. 1)	The Criminal Procedure (Amendment) Rules 2023
45	The Civil Legal Aid (Financial Resources and Payment for Services) (Amendment) Regulations 2023
46	The M25 Junction 10/A3 Wisley Interchange Development Consent (Correction) Order 2023
47 (W. 6)	The Council Tax Reduction Schemes (Prescribed Requirements and Default Scheme) (Wales) (Amendment) Regulations 2023
48	The Fenland (Electoral Changes) Order 2023
49	The Mole Valley (Electoral Changes) Order 2023
50	The Architects Act 1997 (Amendment) Regulations 2023
51	Not Allocated
52	The East Hertfordshire (Electoral Changes) Order 2023
53	The National Health Service (NHS Payment Scheme – Consultation) (No. 2) Regulations 2023
54	The Air Navigation (Restriction of Flying) (Harlow) (Emergency) (Revocation) Regulations 2023
55	The Air Navigation (Restriction of Flying) (Wimbledon) (Amendment) Regulations 2023
56	The Air Navigation (Restriction of Flying) (Cheltenham) (Amendment) Regulations 2023
57 (W. 7)	The A40 Trunk Road (Park Road, Abergavenny, Monmouthshire) (Temporary Prohibition of Vehicles) Order 2023
58 (C. 4)	The Advanced Research and Invention Agency Act 2022 (Commencement) Regulations 2023
59	The School and Early Years Finance (England) Regulations 2023
60 (W. 8)	The A40 Trunk Road (Llandeilo to Carmarthen, Carmarthenshire) (Temporary Traffic Prohibitions & Restrictions) Order 2023
61 (L. 2)	The Family Procedure (Amendment) Rules 2023
62 (W. 9)	The A458 Trunk Road (Llanerfyl, Powys) (Temporary Prohibition of Vehicles) Order 2023
63	The Control of Explosives Precursors and Poisons Regulations 2023
64	The Excise Duties and Value Added Tax (Northern Ireland) (Miscellaneous Modifications and Amendments) Regulations 2023
65 (W. 10)	The Judicial Offices (Sitting in Retirement – Prescribed Offices and Descriptions) (Wales) Regulations 2023
66 (W. 11)	The A483 Trunk Road (Llanelwedd to Howey, Powys) (Temporary Prohibition of Traffic) Order 2023
67 (W. 12)	The Care and Support (Charging) and (Financial Assessment) (Wales) (Miscellaneous Amendments) Regulations 2023
68	The Value Added Tax (Margin Schemes and Removal or Export of Goods: VAT-related Payments) Order 2023
69 (C. 5)	The Finance Act 2022, Section 71 (Margin Schemes and Removal or Export of Goods: Zero-rating) (Appointed Day and Transitional Provision) Regulations 2023
70	The Air Navigation (Restriction of Flying) (Helicopter Flight) (No. 2) Regulations 2023
71	The Protection of Trading Interests (Authorisation) (Amendment) Regulations 2023
72 (W. 13)	The Non-Domestic Rating (Multiplier) (Wales) Regulations 2023
73	The International Development Association (Multilateral Debt Relief Initiative) (Amendment) Order 2023
74	The Education (Student Fees, Awards and Support) (Amendment) Regulations 2023
75	The Air Navigation (Restriction of Flying) (Bradwell on Sea) (Emergency) Regulations 2023
76 (W. 14)	The Allocation of Housing and Homelessness (Eligibility) (Wales) (Amendment) Regulations 2023
77	The Firearms (Amendment) Rules 2023
78	The Diocese of Chelmsford (Educational Endowments) (St. Saviour's Church of England Primary School) Order 2023
79	The Air Navigation (Restriction of Flying) (Bradwell on Sea) (Emergency) (Revocation) Regulations 2023
80	The Transport (Scotland) Act 2019 (Consequential Provisions and Modifications) Order 2023
81	The National Health Service (Charges to Overseas Visitors) (Amendment) Regulations 2023
82	The Marriage and Civil Partnership (Minimum Age) Act 2022 (Consequential Amendments) Regulations 2023
83	The Air Navigation (Restriction of Flying) (Abingdon Air and Country Show) Regulations 2023
84	The A500 Trunk Road (Wolstanton Junction Improvement Scheme) (Detrunking) Order 2023
85 (W. 15)	The National Health Service (Charges to Overseas Visitors) (Amendment) (Wales) Regulations 2023
86 (W. 16)	The A483 Trunk Road (Junction 5 (Mold Road Interchange), Wrexham to the Wales/England Border) (Temporary Traffic Prohibitions & Restrictions) Order 2023
87 (W. 17)	The Education (Student Finance) (Miscellaneous Amendments) (Wales) Regulations 2023
88 (C. 6)	The Marriage and Civil Partnership (Minimum Age) Act 2022 (Commencement and Transitional Provisions) Regulations 2023
89 (C. 7)	The Northern Ireland (Executive Formation etc.) Act 2022 (Commencement) Regulations 2023
90	The Environmental Targets (Woodland and Trees Outside Woodland) (England) Regulations 2023
91	The Environmental Targets (Biodiversity) (England) Regulations 2023
92	The Environmental Targets (Residual Waste) (England) Regulations 2023
93	The Environmental Targets (Water) (England) Regulations 2023
94	The Environmental Targets (Marine Protected Areas) Regulations 2023
95	The Air Navigation (Restriction of Flying) (Harlow) (No. 2) (Emergency) Regulations 2023
96	The Environmental Targets (Fine Particulate Matter) (England) Regulations 2023
97	The Criminal Legal Aid (Remuneration) (Amendment) Regulations 2023
98	The Health and Social Care Information Centre (Transfer of Functions, Abolition and Transitional Provisions) Regulations 2023
99	Not Allocated
100 (C. 8)	The Youth Justice and Criminal Evidence Act 1999 (Commencement No. 30) Order 2023

== 101–200 ==
Number	Title
101 (W. 18)	The A458 Trunk Road (West of Cyfronydd, Powys) (Temporary Prohibition of Vehicles) Order 2023
102 (W. 19)	The Countryside and Rights of Way Act 2000 (Review of Maps) (Amendment) (Wales) Regulations 2023
103	The Middlesbrough Development Corporation (Establishment) Order 2023
104	The Hartlepool Development Corporation (Establishment) Order 2023
105 (L. 3)	The Civil Procedure (Amendment) Rules 2023
106	The Trade in Endangered Species of Wild Fauna and Flora (Council Regulation (EC) No 338/97) (Amendment) Regulations 2023
107	The Annual Tax on Enveloped Dwellings (Indexation of Annual Chargeable Amounts) Order 2023
108 (W. 20)	The A458 Trunk Road (Trewern, Powys) (40 mph & 50 mph Speed Limits) Order 2023
109 (C. 9)	The Product Security and Telecommunications Infrastructure Act 2022 (Commencement No. 1) Regulations 2023
110	The East Northamptonshire Resource Management Facility Order 2023
111	The Immigration (Leave to Enter and Remain) (Amendment) Order 2023
112	The State Immunity Act 1978 (Remedial) Order 2023
113	The Public Service Pension Schemes (Rectification of Unlawful Discrimination) (Tax) Regulations 2023
114	The Air Navigation (Restriction of Flying) (Aintree) Regulations 2023
115 (C. 10)	The Elections Act 2022 (Commencement No. 7) Regulations 2023
116	The Pension Protection Fund and Occupational Pension Schemes (Levy Ceiling) Order 2023
117	The Pension Protection Fund and Occupational Pension Schemes (Levy Ceiling) (No. 2) Order 2023
118	The Climate Change (Targeted Greenhouse Gases) Order 2023
119	The Immingham Open Cycle Gas Turbine (Amendment) Order 2023
120 (W. 21)	The A479 Trunk Road (Near Bronllys, Powys) (Temporary Prohibition of Vehicles, Cyclists, Equestrians and Livestock) Order 2023
121	The Sanctions (Humanitarian Exception) (Amendment) Regulations 2023
122	The Air Navigation (Restriction of Flying) (Harlow) (No. 2) (Emergency) (Revocation) Regulations 2023
123	The Civil Contingencies Act 2004 (Amendment of List of Responders) Order 2023
124	The Market Measures Payment Schemes (Amendments, Revocation and Transitional Provision) (England) Regulations 2023
125	The Air Navigation (Restriction of Flying) (Tees Bay) (Emergency) Regulations 2023
126	The Building Safety (Leaseholder Protections) (England) (Amendment) Regulations 2023
127	The Feed-in Tariffs (Amendment) Order 2023
128	The Air Navigation (Restriction of Flying) (Royal Air Force Waddington) Regulations 2023
129	The Education (Student Loans) (Repayment) (Amendment) Regulations 2023
130	The Air Navigation (Restriction of Flying) (Tees Bay) (Emergency) (Revocation) Regulations 2023
131	The Food Supplements and Food for Specific Groups (Miscellaneous Amendments) (No. 2) Regulations 2023
132	The Air Navigation (Restriction of Flying) (Central London) (Emergency) Regulations 2023
133	The Air Navigation (Restriction of Flying) (Great Yarmouth) (Emergency) Regulations 2023
134	The Bereavement Benefits (Remedial) Order 2023
135 - 137	Not Allocated
138	The Air Navigation (Restriction of Flying) (Central London) (Emergency) (Revocation) Regulations 2023
139	The River Tyne (Tunnels) (Modification) Order 2023
140	The Lancashire County Council (A601(M) Partial Revocation) Scheme 2022 Confirmation Instrument 2023
141	The Police and Criminal Evidence Act 1984 (Codes of Practice) (Revision of Code H) Order 2023
142	The Town and Country Planning (Development Management Procedure) (England) (Amendment) Order 2023
143	The Bassetlaw (Electoral Changes) Order 2023
144	The East Riding of Yorkshire (Electoral Changes) Order 2023
145	The Chelmsford (Electoral Changes) Order 2023
146	The Air Navigation (Restriction of Flying) (Great Yarmouth) (Emergency) (Revocation) Regulations 2023
147	The Civil Legal Aid (Housing and Asylum Accommodation) Order 2023
148	The Air Navigation (Restriction of Flying) (Warrington) (Emergency) Regulations 2023
149	The Judicial Review and Courts Act 2022 (Magistrates’ Court Sentencing Powers) Regulations 2023
150	The Legal Aid, Sentencing and Punishment of Offenders Act 2012 (Legal Aid: Family and Domestic Abuse) (Miscellaneous Amendments) Order 2023
151	The Middlesbrough (Electoral Changes) Order 2023
152	The Dartford (Electoral Changes) Order 2023
153 (W. 22)	The A449 & A40 Trunk Roads (Coldra Interchange, Newport to the Wales/England Border, Monmouthshire) (Temporary Traffic Prohibitions & Restrictions) Order 2023
154 (W. 23)	The Council Tax (Additional Provisions for Discount Disregards) (Amendment) (Wales) Regulations 2023
155	The Tewkesbury (Electoral Changes) Order 2023
156	The Air Navigation (Restriction of Flying) (Colchester) Regulations 2023
157	The Universal Credit (Work-Related Requirements) In Work Pilot Scheme (Extension) Order 2023
158 (C. 11)	The Armed Forces Act 2021 (Commencement No. 5) Regulations 2023
159	The Countryside Stewardship (England) (Amendment) Regulations 2023
160	The Ashford (Electoral Changes) (No. 1) Order 2023
161	The Ashford (Electoral Changes) (No. 2) Order 2023
162	The Dentists, Dental Care Professionals, Nurses, Nursing Associates and Midwives (International Registrations) Order 2023
163	The Naval, Military and Air Forces Etc. (Disablement and Death) Service Pensions (Amendment) Order 2023
164	The Parochial Fees (Amendment) Order 2023
165	The Riverside Energy Park (Amendment) Order 2023
166	The Inspectors of Education, Children's Services and Skills Order 2023
167 (W. 24)	The A487 Trunk Road (Machynlleth, Powys to the North of Dyfi Bridge, Gwynedd) (Temporary Speed Restrictions and Prohibition of Overtaking) Order 2023
168	The East Cambridgeshire (Electoral Changes) Order 2023
169	The Air Navigation (Restriction of Flying) (Warrington) (Emergency) (Revocation) Regulations 2023
170 (W. 25)	The A465 Trunk Road (Westbound Entry Slip Road at Brynmawr Interchange, Blaenau Gwent) (Temporary Prohibition of Vehicles) Order 2023
171	The National Health Service (Amendments Relating to Pre-Payment Certificates, Hormone Replacement Therapy Treatments and Medicines Shortages) Regulations 2023
172	The Maritime Enforcement Powers (Specification of the Civil Nuclear Constabulary) Regulations 2023
173	The Policing and Crime Act 2017 (Maritime Enforcement Powers: Revised Code of Practice) Regulations 2023
174	The Education (School Day and School Year) (England) (Amendment) Regulations 2023
175	The Non-Domestic Rating (Designated Areas) Regulations 2023
176	The South Yorkshire Passenger Transport Executive (Transfer of Functions) Order 2023
177	Not Allocated
178	The Alternative Fuel Payment Pass-through Requirement (England and Wales and Scotland) Regulations 2023
179	The Tax Credits and Child Benefit (Miscellaneous Amendments) Regulations 2023
180	The Public Service (Civil Servants and Others) Pensions (Amendment) Regulations 2023
181	The Air Navigation (Restriction of Flying) (Wembley Stadium) Regulations 2023
182 (W. 26)	The A470 Trunk Road (Mallwyd Roundabout, Gwynedd to Black Cat Roundabout, Conwy) (Temporary Traffic Prohibitions and Restrictions) Order 2023
183 (W. 27)	The A5 Trunk Road (Junction 11, (Llys y Gwynt Interchange), Bangor, Gwynedd to (Gledrid Roundabout), Chirk, Wrexham to the Wales/England Border) (Temporary Traffic Prohibitions and Restrictions) Order 2023
184	The Post Office Horizon Compensation and Infected Blood Interim Compensation Payment Schemes (Tax Exemptions and Relief) Regulations 2023
185	The Road Traffic Act 1988 (Police Driving: Prescribed Training) Regulations 2023
186	The Social Security (Contributions) (Amendment) Regulations 2023
187	The Local Government (Structural Changes) (Supplementary Provision and Amendment) Order 2023
188	The Non-Domestic Alternative Fuel Payment Pass-through Requirement and Amendment Regulations 2023
189	The Diocese of Portsmouth (Educational Endowments) (Oakfield Church of England Primary School) Order 2023
190	The Diocese of Hereford (Educational Endowments) (St Mary's Church of England Primary School) Order 2023
191	The Cotswold (Electoral Changes) Order 2023
192	The East Suffolk (Electoral Changes) Order 2023
193	The Private Security Industry Act 2001 (Licences) (Amendment) Regulations 2023
194	The Customs Tariff (Preferential Trade Arrangements) (New Zealand) (Amendment) Regulations 2023
195	The Customs Tariff (Preferential Trade Arrangements and Tariff Quotas) (Australia) (Amendment) Regulations 2023
196	Not Allocated
197	The Air Navigation (Restriction of Flying) (Helicopter Flight) (No. 3) Regulations 2023
198	The Regional Rates (Northern Ireland) Regulations 2023
199 (W. 28)	The A483 Trunk Road (Newbridge Bypass, Wrexham County Borough) (Temporary Traffic Prohibitions & Restrictions) Order 2023
200	The Havant (Electoral Changes) Order 2023

== 201–300 ==
Number	Title
201	The Derby (Electoral Changes) Order 2023
202	The Pendle (Electoral Changes) Order 2023
203	The Slough (Electoral Changes) Order 2023
204	The Southampton (Electoral Changes) Order 2023
205	The Air Navigation (Restriction of Flying) (Sherburn-in-Elmet Air Race) Regulations 2023
206 (W. 29)	The A5 Trunk Road (Chirk Bypass, Wrexham County Borough) (Temporary Traffic Prohibitions & Restrictions) Order 2023
207 (W. 30)	The A5 Trunk Road (Halton Roundabout to Whitehurst Roundabout, Chirk, Wrexham County Borough) (Temporary Traffic Prohibitions & Restrictions) Order 2023
208	The Parliamentary Elections (Welsh Forms) (Amendment) Order 2023
209	The Armed Forces (Driving Disqualification Orders) Regulations 2023
210	The Vale of White Horse (Electoral Changes) Order 2023
211	The Broadland (Electoral Changes) Order 2023
212	The South Oxfordshire (Electoral Changes) Order 2023
213	The Police Pensions (Contributions and Pensionable Earnings) (Amendment) (England and Wales) Regulations 2023
214	The Trade (Mobile Roaming) Regulations 2023
215 (W. 31)	The A487 Trunk Road (Great Darkgate Street and Owain Glyndwr Square, Aberystwyth, Ceredigion) (Temporary Traffic Prohibitions) Order 2023
216	The Taxes (Interest Rate) (Amendment) Regulations 2023
217	The Approved Country Lists (Animals and Animal Products) (Amendment) Regulations 2023
218	The A47 Wansford to Sutton Development Consent Order 2023
219	The Packaging Waste (Data Reporting) (England) Regulations 2023
220	The Personal Injuries (NHS Charges) (Amounts) (Amendment) Regulations 2023
221	The Income and Corporation Taxes (Electronic Communications) (Amendment) Regulations 2023
222	The Trade Remedies (Dumping and Subsidisation) (Amendment) Regulations 2023
223	The National Health Service (Joint Working and Delegation Arrangements) (England) (Amendment) Regulations 2023
224 (W. 32)	The A494 Trunk Road (Ewloe Green, Flintshire to Dolgellau, Gwynedd) (Temporary Traffic Restrictions & Prohibitions) Order 2023
225	The Air Navigation (Restriction of Flying) (Greenock) (Emergency) Regulations 2023
226	The Loans for Mortgage Interest (Amendment) Regulations 2023
227 (C. 12)	The Police, Crime, Sentencing and Courts Act 2022 (Commencement No. 1) (England and Wales) Regulations 2023
228	The Oil and Gas Authority (Levy and Fees) Regulations 2023
229	The Building Safety Act 2022 (Consequential Amendments and Prescribed Functions) and Architects Act 1997 (Amendment) Regulations 2023
230	The Exotic Equine Diseases (Compensation) (England) Order 2023
231	The Rating Lists (Valuation Date) (England) Order 2023
232	The Social Security Benefits (Claims and Payments) (Amendment) Regulations 2023
233	The Air Navigation (Restriction of Flying) (Greenock) (Emergency) (Revocation) Regulations 2023
234	The Air Navigation (Restriction of Flying) (Scampton) (Restricted Zone EG R313) (Amendment) Regulations 2023
235	The Genetically Modified Food and Feed (Authorisations and Modifications of Authorisations) (England) Regulations 2023
236	The Social Security (Contributions) (Rates, Limits and Thresholds Amendments and National Insurance Funds Payments) Regulations 2023
237	The Tax Credits, Child Benefit and Guardian's Allowance Up-rating Regulations 2023
238	The Health and Social Care Act 2008 (Regulated Care Functions) Regulations 2023
239	The Branded Health Service Medicines (Costs) (Amendment) Regulations 2023
240	The Valuation for Rating (Coronavirus) (England) Regulations 2023
241	The Local Authorities (Capital Finance and Accounting) (England) (Amendment) Regulations 2023
242	The Veterinary Surgeons and Veterinary Practitioners (Registration) (Amendment) Regulations Order of Council 2023
243	The Wireless Telegraphy (Exemption) (Amendment) Regulations 2023
244	The National Health Service (Optical Charges and Payments) (Amendment) Regulations 2023
245	The Air Navigation (Restriction of Flying) (Cannock) Regulations 2023
246	The Merchant Shipping (Cargo and Passenger Ship Construction and Miscellaneous Amendments) Regulations 2023
247	The Health and Safety and Nuclear (Fees) (Amendment) Regulations 2023
248	The Bracknell Forest (Electoral Changes) Order 2023
249	The Broxtowe (Electoral Changes) Order 2023
250	The Police, Crime, Sentencing and Courts Act 2022 (Consequential Provision) (England and Wales) Regulations 2023
251	The Air Navigation (Restriction of Flying) (St Michael's on Wyre) Regulations 2023
252	The Public Service Pensions Revaluation Order 2023
253 (W. 33)	The Council Tax (Exceptions to Higher Amounts) (Wales) (Amendment) Regulations 2023
254	The Nuclear Regulated Asset Base Model (Revenue Collection) Regulations 2023
255 (W. 34)	The Valuation for Rating (Prescribed Assumptions) (Wales) Regulations 2023
256 (W. 35)	The Town and Country Planning (North Wales Border Control Post) (EU Exit) Special Development Order 2023
257	Not Allocated
258	The M6 Toll Motorway (M6 Toll Junction T1 to M6 Junction 11a, Staffordshire) (Temporary Prohibition of Traffic) Order 2023
259 (C. 13) (W. 36)	The Health and Social Care (Quality and Engagement) (Wales) Act 2020 (Commencement No. 3) Order 2023
260 (W. 37)	The Agricultural Wages (Wales) Order 2023
261 (W. 38)	The Welfare of Animals (Transport) (Miscellaneous Amendments) (Wales) Regulations 2023
262	The Hampshire County Council (M27 Junction 10) (Slip Roads, Special Roads) Scheme 2022 Confirmation Instrument 2023
263 (W. 39)	The A40 Trunk Road (Westbound Slip Roads at Johnstown and St Clears, Carmarthenshire) (Temporary Prohibition of Vehicles) Order 2023
264	The Individual Savings Account (Amendment) Regulations 2023
265	The Occupational Pension Schemes (Pension Protection Fund (Compensation) and Fraud Compensation Payments) (Amendment) Regulations 2023
266	The Social Security Revaluation of Earnings Factors Order 2023
267 (W. 40)	The A48 Trunk Road (Cross Hands Roundabout to South-East of Pensarn Roundabout) and the A40 Trunk Road (Pensarn Roundabout to St Clears Roundabout, Carmarthenshire) (Temporary Traffic Restrictions and Prohibition) Order 2023
268	The Non-Domestic Rating (Rates Retention: Miscellaneous Amendments) Regulations 2023
269	The Child Trust Funds (Amendment) Regulations 2023
270	The Guaranteed Minimum Pensions Increase Order 2023
271	Not Allocated
272	The Safety of Sports Grounds (Designation) (Amendment) (England) Order 2023
273	The Sea Fisheries (Amendment) Regulations 2023
274 (W. 41)	The Duty of Candour Procedure (Wales) Regulations 2023
275	The Higher-Risk Buildings (Descriptions and Supplementary Provisions) Regulations 2023
276	The Childcare and Inspection of Education, Children's Services and Skills (Fees) (Amendments) Regulations 2023
277	The Care and Support (Charging and Assessment of Resources) (Amendment) Regulations 2023
278	The Air Navigation (Restriction of Flying) (Eurovision Song Contest) Regulations 2023
279	The Local Government Pension Scheme (Amendment) Regulations 2023
280	The Guardian's Allowance Up-rating Regulations 2023
281 (W. 42)	The National Health Service (Concerns, Complaints and Redress Arrangements) (Wales) (Amendment) Regulations 2023
282	The Air Navigation (Restriction of Flying) (Greenock) Regulations 2023
283 (C. 14)	The Nationality and Borders Act 2022 (Commencement No. 5 and Transitional Provisions) Regulations 2023
284	The Gas Safety (Management) (Amendment) Regulations 2023
285	The West Suffolk (Electoral Changes) Order 2023
286	The Air Navigation (Restriction of Flying) (Northampton Sywell) Regulations 2023
287	The Welfare of Animals (Transport) (Miscellaneous Amendments) (England and Scotland) Regulations 2023
288	The National Health Service Commissioning Board and Clinical Commissioning Groups (Responsibilities and Standing Rules) (Amendment) Regulations 2023
289	The Thurrock Flexible Generation Plant Consent (Amendment) Order 2023
290	The Postponement of Local Elections (Northern Ireland) Order 2023
291	The Russia (Sanctions) (Overseas Territories) (Amendment) Order 2023
292 (W. 43)	The Care and Support (Population Assessments) (Wales) (Amendment) Regulations 2023
293	The Research and Development (Prescribed Activities) Regulations 2023
294	The Visiting Forces (Designation) Order 2023
295	The Air Navigation (Restriction of Flying) (Stansted) Regulations 2023
296	The Copyright and Performances (Application to Other Countries) (Amendment) Order 2023
297	The Merchant Shipping (Light Dues) (Amendment) Regulations 2023
298	The Sentencing Act 2020 (Magistrates’ Court Sentencing Powers) (Amendment) Regulations 2023
299 (W. 44)	The Health and Social Care (Quality and Engagement) (Wales) Act 2020 (Consequential, Supplementary and Incidental Amendments and Revocations) (Secondary Legislation) Regulations 2023
300	The National Health Service (Charges for Drugs and Appliances) (Amendment) Regulations 2023

== 301–400 ==
Number	Title
301	The National Health Service Pension Schemes (Amendment) Regulations 2023
302	The Export Control (Military and Dual-Use Lists) (Amendment) Regulations 2023
303	The Mandatory Travel Concession (England) (Amendment) Regulations 2023
304	The Air Navigation (Restriction of Flying) (Greenock) (Amendment) Regulations 2023
305	The Immigration (Electronic Travel Authorisations) (Consequential Amendment) Regulations 2023
306	The Health and Care Act 2022 (Consequential and Related Amendments) Regulations 2023
307	The Income Tax (Pay As You Earn) (Amendment) Regulations 2023
308	The Social Security (Contributions) (Amendment No. 2) Regulations 2023
309	The Social Security (Contributions) (Amendment No. 3) Regulations 2023
310	The Recovery of Costs (Remand to Youth Detention Accommodation) (Amendment) Regulations 2023
311	The Little Crow Solar Park (Correction) Order 2023
312	The Alcoholic Beverages (Amendment) (England) Regulations 2023
313	The Coroners and Justice Act 2009 (Alteration of Coroner Areas) Order 2023
314	The Medicines (Products for Human Use) (Fees) (Amendment) Regulations 2023
315	The Building Safety (Registration of Higher-Risk Buildings and Review of Decisions) (England) Regulations 2023
316	The Social Security Benefits Up-rating Order 2023
317 (W. 45)	The A470 Trunk Road (Llanelwedd, Powys) (Temporary Prohibition of Traffic) Order 2023
318	The Employment Rights (Increase of Limits) Order 2023
319	The Amendments of the Law (Resolution of Silicon Valley Bank UK Limited) Order 2023
320	The Gas Safety (Management) (Amendment) (No. 2) Regulations 2023
321	The Prison and Young Offender Institution (Adjudication) (Amendment) Rules 2023
322 (W. 46)	The A470 & A458 Trunk Roads (Moat Lane Level Crossing, Caersws and Buttington Level Crossing, Buttington, Powys) (Temporary Prohibition of Vehicles) Order 2023
323	The Armed Forces and Reserve Forces (Compensation Scheme) (Amendment) Order 2023
324 (W. 47)	The A458 Trunk Road (Broad Street & High Street, Welshpool, Powys) (Temporary Prohibition of Vehicles) Order 2023
325	The Airports Slot Allocation (Alleviation of Usage Requirements) Regulations 2023
326	The Authority to Carry Scheme and Civil Penalties Regulations 2023
327 (L. 5)	The Tribunal Procedure (Amendment) Rules 2023
328	The Radio Equipment (Amendment) (Northern Ireland) Regulations 2023
329	The Excise Duties (Surcharges or Rebates) (Hydrocarbon Oils etc.) Order 2022 (Continuation) Order 2023
330	The Social Security (Contributions) (Re-rating) Consequential Amendment Regulations 2023
331	The Removal, Storage and Disposal of Motor Vehicles (Amendment) Regulations 2023
332	The Personal Injuries (Civilians) Scheme (Amendment) Order 2023
333	The International Fund for Agricultural Development (Twelfth Replenishment) Order 2023
334	The Food Additives, Food Flavourings and Novel Foods (Authorisations) (England) Regulations 2023
335	The Benefit Cap (Annual Limit) (Amendment) Regulations 2023
336	The Ozone-Depleting Substances (Grant of Halon Derogations) Regulations 2023
337 (W. 48)	The A5 Trunk Road (Llyn Ogwen, Conwy County Borough) (Prohibition of Waiting) Order 2023
338	The Pensions Increase (Review) Order 2023
339	The Designation of Schools Having a Religious Character (Independent Schools) (England) Order 2023
340	The Social Security Benefits Up-rating Regulations 2023
341	The Environment (Local Nature Recovery Strategies) (Procedure) Regulations 2023
342 (W. 49)	The A458 Trunk Road (Welshpool, Powys) (Temporary Prohibition of Vehicles and Cyclists) Order 2023
343 (W. 50)	The Food Additives, Food Flavourings, and Novel Foods (Authorisations) and Food and Feed (Miscellaneous Amendments) (Wales) Regulations 2023
344	The Register of Overseas Entities (Disclosure and Dispositions) Regulations 2023
345	The Air Navigation (Restriction of Flying) (HM Dockyard, Portsmouth) Regulations 2023
346	The Immigration (Offshore Worker Notification and Exemption from Control (Amendment)) Regulations 2023
347	The Pensions Appeal Tribunals (Late Appeal) (Amendment) Regulations 2023
348	The International Organisations (Tax Exemptions Designation) Order 2023
349	The Immigration and Nationality (Fees) (Amendment) Regulations 2023
350 (W. 51)	The Non-Domestic Rating (Alteration of Lists and Appeals) (Wales) Regulations 2023
351	The Agriculture (Financial Assistance) (Amendment) Regulations 2023
352	The Government Resources and Accounts Act 2000 (Estimates and Accounts) Order 2023
353 (W. 52)	The A470 Trunk Road (Glan Conwy to Black Cat Roundabout, Conwy) (40 mph Speed Limit) Order 2023
354	The National Minimum Wage (Amendment) Regulations 2023
355	The Special Immigration Appeals Commission (Procedure) (Amendment) Rules 2023
356 (W. 53)	The A470 Trunk Road (Llanrwst, Conwy) (Temporary Prohibition of Vehicles, Cyclists and Pedestrians) Order 2023
357	The Air Navigation (Restriction of Flying) (Moreton in Marsh) Regulations 2023
358	The Air Navigation (Restriction of Flying) (Royal Air Force Waddington) (No. 2) Regulations 2023
359 (W. 54)	The A465 Trunk Road (Taf Fechan Viaduct, Cefn Coed, Merthyr Tydfil) (Temporary Prohibition of Large Vehicles) Order 2023
360	The Princess Alexandra Hospital National Health Service Trust (Establishment) (Amendment) Order 2023
361	The Social Security Additional Payments (First Qualifying Day) Regulations 2023
362 (C. 15)	The Building Safety Act 2022 (Commencement No. 4 and Transitional Provisions) Regulations 2023
363 (W. 55)	The A483 Trunk Road (Junction 1 (Ruabon Interchange) to the Wales/England Border, Wrexham County Borough) (Temporary Traffic Prohibitions & Restrictions) Order 2023
364	The East Suffolk Internal Drainage Board Order 2023
365	The Merchant Shipping (Seamen's Documents) (Amendment) Regulations 2023
366	The Criminal Legal Aid (Remuneration) (Amendment) (No. 2) Regulations 2023
367	The National Health Service (Dental Charges) (Amendment) Regulations 2023
368	The Health Education England (Transfer of Functions, Abolition and Transitional Provisions) Regulations 2023
369	The Economic Crime (Anti-Money Laundering) Levy (Amendment) Regulations 2023
370 (W. 56) (C. 16)	The Health and Social Care (Quality and Engagement) (Wales) Act 2020 (Commencement No. 4) Order 2023
371 (C. 17)	The Health and Care Act 2022 (Commencement No. 4) Regulations 2023
372	The Pneumoconiosis etc. (Workers’ Compensation) (Payment of Claims) (Amendment) Regulations 2023
373	The Mesothelioma Lump Sum Payments (Conditions and Amounts) (Amendment) Regulations 2023
374 (W. 57)	The A487 Trunk Road (Dyfi Bridge to Parc Menai, Gwynedd) (Temporary Traffic Prohibitions and Restrictions) Order 2023
375	The Education (National Curriculum) (Key Stage 1 Assessment Arrangements) (England) (Amendment) Order 2023
376	The Value Added Tax (Installation of Energy-Saving Materials) Order 2023
377	The Medical Devices and Blood Safety and Quality (Fees Amendment) Regulations 2023
378 (W. 58)	The Education Workforce Council (Main Functions) (Wales) (Amendments Relating to Parental Bereavement Leave and Shared Parental Leave) Regulations 2023
379 (W. 59)	The Genetically Modified Food and Feed (Authorisations and Modifications of Authorisations) (Wales) Regulations 2023
380	The Education (Pupil Information and School Performance Information) (England) (Amendment) Regulations 2023
381 (C. 18)	The Environment Act 2021 (Commencement No. 6) Regulations 2023
382	The Free Zone (Customs Site No. 1 East Midlands) Designation Order 2023
383 (C. 19)	The Social Security (Special Rules for End of Life) Act 2022 (Commencement) Regulations 2023
384	The Merchant Shipping (Prevention of Air Pollution from Ships) (Amendment) Regulations 2023
385 (C. 20)	The Finance Act 2009 (VAT-related Payments) (Interest) (Appointed Day) Order 2023
386	The School Teachers’ Pay and Conditions (England) (No. 2) (Amendment) Order 2023
387 (C. 21)	The Police, Crime, Sentencing and Courts Act 2022 (Commencement No. 6 and Piloting, Transitional and Saving Provisions) Regulations 2023
388	The Value Added Tax Act 1994 (Schedule 9) (Exemptions: Health and Welfare) (Amendment) Order 2023
389	The Electricity Supplier Obligations (Green Excluded Electricity) (Amendment) Regulations 2023
390	The Criminal Justice Act 2003 (Home Detention Curfew) Order 2023
391 (W. 60)	The Revised Code of Practice on the exercise of social services functions in relation to Part 4 (direct payments and choice of accommodation) and Part 5 (charging and financial assessment) of the Social Services and Well-being (Wales) Act 2014 (Appointed Day) Order 2023
392	The Freedom of Information (Removal of References to Public Authorities) Order 2023
393	The Major Sporting Events (Income Tax Exemption) (Women's Finalissima Football Match) Regulations 2023
394 (W. 61)	The Alcoholic Beverages (Amendment) (Wales) Regulations 2023
395 (C. 22)	The Scotland Act 2016 (Commencement No. 5) (Amendment) Regulations 2023
396	The Higher-Risk Buildings (Key Building Information etc.) (England) Regulations 2023
397	The Parole Board (Amendment) Rules 2023
398	Not Allocated
399	The Occupational Pension Schemes (Administration, Investment, Charges and Governance) and Pensions Dashboards (Amendment) Regulations 2023
400	The Wireless Telegraphy (Licence Charges) (Amendment) Regulations 2023

== 401–500 ==
Number	Title
401	The Air Navigation (Restriction of Flying) (Coventry) Regulations 2023
402	The Local Government and Elections (Wales) Act 2021 (Corporate Joint Committees) (Consequential Amendments) Order 2023
403	The Judicial Pensions (Fee-Paid Judges) (Amendment) Regulations 2023
404	The Treasure (Designation) (Amendment) Order 2023
405	The Care and Support (Charging and Assessment of Resources) (Amendment) (No. 2) Regulations 2023
406 (C. 23)	The Domestic Abuse Act 2021 (Commencement No. 1) Regulations 2023
407 (W. 62)	The A458 Trunk Road (Mallwyd to Nant yr Ehedydd, Gwynedd) (Temporary Traffic Prohibitions & Restrictions) Order 2023
408	The Air Navigation (Restriction of Flying) (Chelmsford) Regulations 2023
409	The Air Navigation (Restriction of Flying) (Teignmouth) Regulations 2023
410	The Air Navigation (Restriction of Flying) (Duxford) Regulations 2023
411	The Air Navigation (Restriction of Flying) (Birmingham) Regulations 2023
412	The Value Added Tax (Margin Schemes and Removal or Export of Goods: VAT-related Payments) (Late Payment Interest and Repayment Interest) (Amendment) Order 2023
413	The River Tyne (Tunnels) (Revision of Toll) Order 2023
414	The Data Protection Act 2018 (Transitional Provision) Regulations 2023
415	The Electricity Supplier Obligations (Excluded Electricity) (Amendment) Regulations 2023
416	The Supported Accommodation (England) Regulations 2023
417	The M42 Motorway (Junction 7a to Junction 9) and M6 Toll Motorway (M6 Junction 3a to M6 Toll Junction T2) (Temporary Restriction and Prohibition of Traffic) Order 2023
418	The Northampton Gateway Rail Freight Interchange (Amendment) Order 2023
419	The Air Navigation (Restriction of Flying) (Belfast) Regulations 2023
420 (W. 63)	The Education (Admission Appeals Arrangements) (Wales) (Amendment) Regulations 2023
421 (W. 64)	The A55 Trunk Road (Junction 8 (Ael y Bowl Interchange) to Junction 8A (Carreg Bran), Isle of Anglesey) (Temporary Prohibition of Vehicles, Cyclists and Pedestrians) Order 2023
422 (W. 65)	The A55 Trunk Road (Penmaenbach Tunnel, Conwy County Borough) (Temporary Traffic Prohibitions & Restrictions) Order 2023
423 (W. 66)	The A483 Trunk Road (Llanymynech, Powys) (Temporary Prohibition of Vehicles) Order 2023
424	The Secretaries of State for Energy Security and Net Zero, for Science, Innovation and Technology, for Business and Trade, and for Culture, Media and Sport and the Transfer of Functions (National Security and Investment Act 2021 etc.) Order 2023
425	The Safety of Sports Grounds (Designation) (Amendment) (England) (No. 2) Order 2023
426	The Air Navigation (Restriction of Flying) (Royal Liverpool Golf Course) Regulations 2023
427	Not Allocated
428	The Non-Domestic Alternative Fuel Payment Application Scheme Pass-through Requirement Regulations 2023
429	The Air Navigation (Restriction of Flying) (Belfast and Hillsborough) Regulations 2023
430	The Unpaid Work Requirements (Prescribed Persons for Consultation) Regulations 2023
431	The Single Trade Window (Preparation) Regulations 2023
432	The Hornsea Three Offshore Wind Farm (Amendment) Order 2023
433	The Customs Tariff (Preferential Trade Arrangements and Miscellaneous Amendments) Regulations 2023
434	The Air Navigation (Restriction of Flying) (Coronation Events, London) Regulations 2023
435	The Police Act 1997 (Criminal Records) (Amendment and Saving Provision) Regulations 2023
436	The National Health Service (General Medical Services Contracts and Personal Medical Services Agreements) (Amendment) Regulations 2023
437	The Human Medicines (Amendment) Regulations 2023
438	The Air Navigation (Restriction of Flying) (Ragley Hall, Alcester) Regulations 2023
439 (W. 67)	The Local Authorities (Capital Finance and Accounting) (Wales) (Amendment) Regulations 2023
440	The Russia (Sanctions) (EU Exit) (Amendment) Regulations 2023
441	The Immigration (Citizens’ Rights Appeals) (EU Exit) (Amendment) Regulations 2023
442	The Keadby 3 (Carbon Capture Equipped Gas Fired Generating Station) (Correction) Order 2023
443 (W. 68)	The School Teachers’ Pay and Conditions (Wales) Order 2023
444	The Air Navigation (Restriction of Flying) (Villa Park, Birmingham) Regulations 2023
445	The Air Navigation (Restriction of Flying) (Torbay) Regulations 2023
446	The Hartlepool Development Corporation (Functions) Order 2023
447	The Middlesbrough Development Corporation (Functions) Order 2023
448	The Education (Induction Arrangements for School Teachers) (England) (Amendment) Regulations 2023
449	The National Health Service (General Medical Services Contracts and Personal Medical Services Agreements) (Amendment) (No. 2) Regulations 2023
450 (C. 24)	The Nationality and Borders Act 2022 (Commencement No. 6) Regulations 2023
451	The Air Navigation (Restriction of Flying) (Cleethorpes) Regulations 2023
452	The Air Navigation (Restriction of Flying) (Glastonbury Festival) Regulations 2023
453	The Energy Bills Discount Scheme Regulations 2023
454	The Energy Bills Discount Scheme (Northern Ireland) Regulations 2023
455	The Energy Bills Discount Scheme Pass-through Requirement (Heat Suppliers) Regulations 2023
456	The Direct Payments to Farmers (Reductions) (England) Regulations 2023
457	The Air Navigation (Restriction of Flying) (Ascot) Regulations 2023
458	The Air Navigation (Restriction of Flying) (Falmouth) Regulations 2023
459	The Hornsea Three Offshore Wind Farm (Amendment) Order 2023
460 (C. 25)	The Taxis and Private Hire Vehicles (Safeguarding and Road Safety) Act 2022 (Commencement) Regulations 2023
461	The International Tax Compliance (Amendment) Regulations 2023
462 (W. 69)	The A465 Trunk Road (Neath to Llandarcy, Neath Port Talbot) (Temporary Traffic Prohibitions & Restrictions) Order 2023
463	The Energy Bills Discount Scheme Pass-through Requirement Regulations 2023
464	The Energy Bills Discount Scheme (Non-Standard Cases) Regulations 2023
465	The Air Navigation (Restriction of Flying) (Isle of Wight) Regulations 2023
466 (W. 70)	The Water Resources (Control of Agricultural Pollution) (Wales) (Amendment) Regulations 2023
467	The Charities (Dispositions of Land: Designated Advisers and Reports) Regulations 2023
468	The Microchipping of Cats and Dogs (England) Regulations 2023
469	The Product Security and Telecommunications Infrastructure Act 2022 (Commencement No. 2) Regulations 2023
470	The Dee Estuary Conservancy Harbour Revision Order 2023
471	The Air Navigation (Restriction of Flying) (Headcorn) Regulations 2023
472	The Pension Fund Clearing Obligation Exemption and Intragroup Transaction Transitional Clearing and Risk-Management Obligation Exemptions (Extension and Amendment) Regulations 2023
473	The Indirect Taxes (Notifiable Arrangements) (Amendment) Regulations 2023
474	The Air Navigation (Restriction of Flying) (Greenwich) Regulations 2023
475 (W. 71)	The Construction Contracts (Exclusion) (Wales) Order 2023
476	The Air Navigation (Restriction of Flying) (Royal Air Force Waddington) (No. 3) Regulations 2023
477	The PEACE PLUS Programme (Northern Ireland) Regulations 2023
478	The Air Navigation (Restriction of Flying) (Leeds East Air Race) Regulations 2023
479	The National Health Service (Pharmaceutical and Local Pharmaceutical Services) (Amendment) Regulations 2023
480	The Mid Yorkshire Hospitals National Health Service Trust (Establishment) (Amendment) Order 2023
481 (W. 72)	The A458 Trunk Road (Broad Street & High Street, Welshpool, Powys) (Temporary Prohibition of Vehicles) (No. 2) Order 2023
482	The Income Tax (Care Leaver's Apprenticeship Bursary Payment) (Amendment) Regulations 2023
483	The Air Navigation (Restriction of Flying) (Kirkby in Ashfield) (Emergency) Regulations 2023
484	The Public Procurement (International Trade Agreements) (Amendment) Regulations 2023
485	The Air Navigation (Restriction of Flying) (Royal Air Force Cosford) Regulations 2023
486	The Air Navigation (Restriction of Flying) (Jet Formation Display Teams) Regulations 2023
487	The Air Navigation (Restriction of Flying) (Chelsea Flower Show) Regulations 2023
488	Not Allocated
489	The Air Navigation (Restriction of Flying) (His Majesty the King's Birthday Flypast) Regulations 2023
490	The Air Navigation (Restriction of Flying) (Duxford) (No. 2) Regulations 2023
491	The Air Navigation (Restriction of Flying) (Swansea Bay) Regulations 2023
492	The Air Navigation (Restriction of Flying) (Stonehenge) Regulations 2023
493	The Air Navigation (Restriction of Flying) (Helicopter Flight) (No. 4) Regulations 2023
494 (W. 73)	The Cancellation of Student Loans for Living Costs Liability (Wales) Regulations 2023
495 (W. 74)	The A470 Trunk Road (Northbound Entry Slip Road at Taffs Well, Rhondda Cynon Taf) (Temporary Traffic Prohibitions) Order 2023
496	The Air Navigation (Restriction of Flying) (Cambridge) Regulations 2023
497	The Plant Health and Phytosanitary Conditions (Oak Processionary Moth and Plant Pests) (Amendment) Regulations 2023
498	The Licensing Act 2003 (Coronation Licensing Hours) Order 2023
499	The Air Navigation (Restriction of Flying) (Wembley Stadium) (No. 2) Regulations 2023
500 (W. 75)	The A55 Trunk Road (Conwy Tunnel, Conwy County Borough) (Temporary Traffic Prohibitions and Restrictions) Order 2023

== 501–600 ==
Number	Title
501	The Competition Act 1998 (Motor Vehicle Agreements Block Exemption) Order 2023
502 (C. 26)	The Public Order Act 2023 (Commencement No. 1) Regulations 2023
503	The Air Navigation (Restriction of Flying) (Folkestone) Regulations 2023
504	The Building (Public Bodies and Higher-Risk Building Work) (England) Regulations 2023
505	The Air Navigation (Restriction of Flying) (Crystal Palace) Regulations 2023
506 (W. 76)	The Public Procurement (International Trade Agreements) (Amendment) (Wales) Regulations 2023
507	The Air Navigation (Restriction of Flying) (Royal Air Force Cosford) (No. 2) Regulations 2023
508	The Tonnage Tax (Further Opportunity for Election) Order 2023
509	The Homelessness (Suitability of Accommodation) (England) (Amendment) Order 2023
510	The Flags (Northern Ireland) (Amendment) Regulations 2023
511 (W. 77)	The A40 Trunk Road (Brecon Road, Monmouthshire to the County Boundary at Glangrwyney, Powys) (Temporary Traffic Prohibitions and Restrictions) Order 2023
512 (W. 78)	The M4 Motorway & A470 Trunk Road (Coryton Interchange, Cardiff to Cefn Coed Roundabout, Merthyr Tydfil) (Temporary Prohibition of Vehicles & Cyclists) Order 2023
513	The Power to Award Degrees etc. (NCG) Order of Council 2016 (Amendment) Order 2023
514	The Access to the Countryside (Coastal Margin) (Cleveleys to Pier Head No. 1) Order 2023
515	The National Health Service (Charges to Overseas Visitors) (Amendment) (No. 2) Regulations 2023
516	The Access to the Countryside (Coastal Margin) (Easington to Filey Brigg) Order 2023
517	The Spring Traps Approval (Variation) (England) Order 2023
518	The Community Investment Tax Relief (Amendment of Investment Limits) Regulations 2023
519	Not Allocated
520	The Building etc. (Amendment) (England) Regulations 2023
521	The Education (Student Finance) (Miscellaneous Amendments) Regulations 2023
522	The Local Government Pension Scheme (Amendment) (No. 2) Regulations 2023
523	The Network Rail (Essex and Others Level Crossing Reduction) (Amendment) Order 2023
524	The Road Vehicles (Authorisation of Special Types) (General) (Amendment) Order 2023
525	The National Health Service (Performers Lists) (England) (Amendment) Regulations 2023
526 (W. 79)	The A470 Trunk Road (Dolwen, North-east of Llanidloes, Powys) (Temporary Prohibition of Vehicles) Order 2023
527	The Air Navigation (Restriction of Flying) (Spalding Flower Show) Regulations 2023
528	The Air Navigation (Restriction of Flying) (Peterhead) Regulations 2023
529	The Air Navigation (Restriction of Flying) (The Palace of Holyroodhouse) Regulations 2023
530	The Allocation of Housing and Homelessness (Eligibility) (England) and Persons Subject to Immigration Control (Housing Authority Accommodation and Homelessness) (Amendment) Regulations 2023
531	The Air Navigation (Restriction of Flying) (Fishburn Air Race) Regulations 2023
532	The Social Security (Habitual Residence and Past Presence) (Amendment) Regulations 2023
533	The Child Benefit (General) (Amendment) Regulations 2023
534	The Register of Overseas Entities (Definition of Foreign Limited Partner, Protection and Rectification) Regulations 2023
535 (C. 27)	The European Union (Future Relationship) Act 2020 (Commencement No. 2) Regulations 2023
536	The Air Navigation (Restriction of Flying) (Old Buckenham) Regulations 2023
537	The Air Navigation (Restriction of Flying) (East London) Regulations 2023
538 (W. 80)	The A5 Trunk Road (High Street, Bethesda, Gwynedd) (Temporary Prohibition of Vehicles) Order 2023
539	Not Allocated
540	The Railways and Other Guided Transport Systems (Safety) (Amendment) Regulations 2023
541 (W. 82)	The National Health Service (Charges to Overseas Visitors) (Amendment) (No. 2) (Wales) Regulations 2023
542	The Criminal Legal Aid (Remuneration) (Amendment) (No. 3) Regulations 2023
543	The Social Security and Universal Credit (Miscellaneous Amendments) Regulations 2023
544 (W. 83)	The A487 Trunk Road (Waunfawr to Dorglwyd, Ceredigion) (50 mph Speed Limit) Order 2023
545	The Social Fund Maternity and Funeral Expenses (General) and Social Security (Claims and Payments) (Amendment) Regulations 2023
546 (W. 84)	The A487 Trunk Road (Great Darkgate Street and Owain Glyndwr Square, Aberystwyth, Ceredigion) (Temporary Traffic Prohibitions) Order 2023
547	The Social Security (Disability Additional Payment Day) Regulations 2023
548	The Financial Services and Markets Act 2000 (Commodity Derivatives and Emission Allowances) Order 2023
549	The Social Fund Winter Fuel Payment (Temporary Increase) Regulations 2023
550 (W. 85)	The Renting Homes (Wales) Act 2016 (Consequential Amendments) Regulations 2023
551 (W. 86)	The Education Workforce Council (Additional Categories of Registration) (Wales) Order 2023
552 (C. 28)	The Elections Act 2022 (Commencement No. 8) Regulations 2023
553	The Republic of Belarus (Sanctions) (EU Exit) (Isle of Man) (Revocation) Order 2023
554	The National Health Service (Primary Dental Services) (Amendment) Regulations 2023
555	The Air Navigation (Restriction of Flying) (Kirkby in Ashfield) (Emergency) (Revocation) Regulations 2023
556 (W. 87)	The Renting Homes (Wales) Act 2016 (Amendment of Schedule 12 and Consequential Amendment) Regulations 2023
557	Customs (Origin of Chargeable Goods: Developing Countries Trading Scheme) Regulations 2023
558	The Higher Education (Registration Fees) (England) (Amendment) Regulations 2023
559	The Sentencing Act 2020 (Special Procedures for Community and Suspended Sentence Orders) Regulations 2023
560	The M180 South Humberside Motorway (Beltoft-Scunthorpe Section) and Connecting Roads (Variation) Scheme 2022 Confirmation Instrument 2023
561	Trade Preference Scheme (Developing Countries Trading Scheme) Regulations 2023
562	The Air Navigation (Restriction of Flying) (Northern Ireland) Regulations 2023
563	The Animal Welfare (Sentience) Act 2022 (Commencement) Regulations 2023
564	Not Allocated
565	The Exotic Equine Diseases (Compensation) (England) (No. 2) Order 2023
566 (C. 29)	The Identity and Language (Northern Ireland) Act 2022 (Commencement) Regulations 2023
567 (W. 88)	The Public Procurement (International Trade Agreements) (Amendment) (Wales) (No. 2) Regulations 2023
568	The Merchant Shipping (Fire Protection) Regulations 2023
569	The Customs (Miscellaneous Amendments) Regulations 2023
570	The Income Tax (Accommodation Allowances of Armed Forces) Regulations 2023
571	The School Discipline (Pupil Exclusions and Reviews) (England) (Amendment and Transitional Provision) Regulations 2023
572 (L. 6)	The Civil Procedure (Amendment No. 2) Rules 2023
573 (C. 30)	The Police, Crime, Sentencing and Courts Act 2022 (Commencement No. 7) Regulations 2023
574	The Air Navigation (Restriction of Flying) (Sheffield) Regulations 2023
575	The Police, Crime, Sentencing and Courts Act 2022 (Extraction of information from electronic devices) (Amendment of Schedule 3) Regulations 2023
576	The National Health Service Pension Scheme (Member Contributions) (Amendment) Regulations 2023
577	The Carbon Accounting (Determination of Excess UK Assigned Amount Units) Regulations 2023
578	The Power to Award Degrees etc. (LIBF Limited) Order 2023
579	The Air Navigation (Restriction of Flying) (His Majesty the King's Birthday Flypast) (No. 2) Regulations 2023
580 (W. 89)	The A40 Trunk Road (Llandovery, Carmarthenshire to Trecastle, Powys) (Temporary Traffic Prohibitions & Restrictions) Order 2023
581	The Air Navigation (Restriction of Flying) (Trooping the Colour Rehearsals) Regulations 2023
582	The Insider Dealing (Securities and Regulated Markets) Order 2023
583	The Air Navigation (Restriction of Flying) (Download Festival, Leicestershire) Regulations 2023
584	The Air Navigation (Restriction of Flying) (Silverstone and Turweston) Regulations 2023
585	The Air Navigation (Restriction of Flying) (Blackpool) Regulations 2023
586	The Competition Act 1998 (Motor Vehicle Agreements Block Exemption) (No. 2) Order 2023
587	The Air Navigation (Restriction of Flying) (Royal International Air Tattoo, Royal Air Force Fairford) Regulations 2023
588	The Aviation Safety (Amendment) Regulations 2023
589	The Air Navigation (Restriction of Flying) (Epsom) Regulations 2023
590	The Air Navigation (Restriction of Flying) (Royal Air Force Honington) Regulations 2023
591	The Air Navigation (Restriction of Flying) (Royal Air Force Valley) Regulations 2023
592	Not Allocated
593	The Universal Credit (Childcare) (Amendment) Regulations 2023
594 (W. 90)	The A55 Trunk Road (Junction 9 (Treborth Interchange) to Junction 10 (Caernarfon Road Interchange), Bangor, Gwynedd) (Temporary Prohibition of Vehicles, Cyclists & Pedestrians) Order 2023
545 (W. 91)	The M4 Motorway (Junction 34 (Miskin), Rhondda Cynon Taf to Junction 49 (Pont Abraham), Carmarthenshire) (Temporary Prohibition of Vehicles) Order 2023
596	The Air Navigation (Restriction of Flying) (Heaton Park) Regulations 2023
597	Not Allocated
598	The Air Navigation (Restriction of Flying) (Henham Park) Regulations 2023
599	The Central Counterparties (Equivalence) (India) (Reserve Bank of India) Regulations 2023
600	The Air Navigation (Restriction of Flying) (Brighton) Regulations 2023

== 601–700 ==
Number	Title
601	The Common Procurement Vocabulary (Amendment) Regulations 2023
602	The Relationships and Sexuality Education (Northern Ireland) (Amendment) Regulations 2023
603	The Care Quality Commission (Fees) (Reviews and Performance Assessments: Integrated Care System) Regulations 2023
604	The Air Navigation (Restriction of Flying) (Royal Air Force Waddington) (No. 4) Regulations 2023
605	The National Savings (Amendment) Regulations 2023
606	The Tobacco Products (Traceability and Security Features) (Amendment) Regulations 2023
607	The Air Navigation (Restriction of Flying) (Crystal Palace) (No. 2) Regulations 2023
608	The M6 Toll Motorway (M6 Junction 3a to M6 Junction 11a) (Temporary Restriction and Prohibition of Traffic) Order 2023
609	The Cheshire East Council (A533 Middlewich Eastern Bypass – Trent and Mersey Canal Bridge) Scheme 2022 Confirmation Instrument 2023
610	The Air Navigation (Restriction of Flying) (Gunnersbury Park) Regulations 2023
611 (W. 92)	The Allocation of Housing and Homelessness (Eligibility) (Wales) (Amendment) (No. 2) Regulations 2023
612	The Financial Services and Markets Act 2000 (Financial Promotion) (Amendment) Order 2023
613 (W. 93)	The A4810 Steelworks Access Road (Queen's Way), (Llanwern, Newport) (Temporary Speed Limits and Clearway) Order 2023
614	The Air Navigation (Restriction of Flying) (Lytham St Annes) Regulations 2023
615	Not Allocated
616	The Republic of Belarus (Sanctions) (EU Exit) (Amendment) Regulations 2023
617	The Air Navigation (Restriction of Flying) (Eastbourne) Regulations 2023
618	The Customs (Northern Ireland: Repayment and Remission) (EU Exit) (Amendment) Regulations 2023
619	Not Allocated
620	The Mobile Homes (Pitch Fees) (Prescribed Form) (England) Regulations 2023
621 (C. 31)	The Armed Forces Act 2021 (Commencement No. 6) Regulations 2023
622	The Plastic Packaging Tax (General) (Amendment) Regulations 2023
623	The Windsor Framework (Disclosure of Revenue and Customs Information) Regulations 2023
624	The Service Police (Complaints etc.) Regulations 2023
625 (W. 94)	The A483 Trunk Road (Llandovery to Sugar Loaf, Carmarthenshire) (Temporary Traffic Prohibitions & Restrictions) Order 2023
626 (W. 95)	The A483 Trunk Road (Pont Abraham to Llandeilo, Carmarthenshire) (Temporary Speed Restrictions & No Overtaking) Order 2023
627	The Medical Devices (Amendment) (Great Britain) Regulations 2023
628 (W. 96)	The A40 Trunk Road (Haverfordwest to Fishguard, Pembrokeshire) (Temporary Speed Restrictions & No Overtaking) Order 2023
629	The Air Navigation (Restriction of Flying) (Flying Legends, Leeds East) Regulations 2023
630	The Air Navigation (Restriction of Flying) (TRNSMT Festival) Regulations 2023
631 (C. 32)	The Judicial Review and Courts Act 2022 (Commencement No. 3) Regulations 2023
632	The Air Navigation (Restriction of Flying) (Wishaw) Regulations 2023
633 (W. 97)	The Education (Student Finance) (Miscellaneous Amendments) (No. 2) (Wales) Regulations 2023
634	The National Health Service (Liabilities to Third Parties Scheme) (England) (Amendment) Regulations 2023
635	Not Allocated
636	The Air Navigation (Restriction of Flying) (Edinburgh Military Tattoo) Regulations 2023
637	The Air Navigation (Restriction of Flying) (Royal Air Force Coningsby) Regulations 2023
638	The Air Navigation (Restriction of Flying) (East Kirkby) Regulations 2023
639	The Air Navigation (Restriction of Flying) (Wishaw) (Amendment) Regulations 2023
640	The Social Security (Income and Capital Disregards) (Amendment) Regulations 2023
641 (C. 33)	The Police, Crime, Sentencing and Courts Act 2022 (Commencement No. 2 and Transitional and Saving Provisions) (England and Wales) Regulations 2023
642	The Air Navigation (Restriction of Flying) (Plymouth Hoe) Regulations 2023
643 (C. 34)	The Charities Act 2022 (Commencement No. 2 and Saving Provisions) Regulations 2023
644	The Dunham Bridge (Revision of Tolls) Order 2023
645 (W. 98)	The A465 Trunk Road (Resolven Roundabout to Glynneath Roundabout, Neath Port Talbot) (Temporary Traffic Prohibitions and Restrictions) Order 2023
646 (W. 99)	The A40 Trunk Road (St Clears, Carmarthenshire to Haverfordwest, Pembrokeshire) (Temporary Speed Restrictions & No Overtaking) Order 2023
647	The Air Navigation (Restriction of Flying) (Sherburn-in-Elmet Air Race) (No. 2) Regulations 2023
648 (C. 35)	The Health and Care Act 2022 (Commencement No. 5) Regulations 2023
649	The Policing Protocol Order 2023
650	The Air Navigation (Restriction of Flying) (Nottingham) (Emergency) Regulations 2023
651	The Environmental Permitting (England and Wales) (Amendment) (England) Regulations 2023
652	The Maidstone (Electoral Changes) Order 2023
653	The Stevenage (Electoral Changes) Order 2023
654	The Redditch (Electoral Changes) Order 2023
655	The Public Order Act 1986 (Serious Disruption to the Life of the Community) Regulations 2023
656	The Libya (Sanctions) (Overseas Territories) (Amendment) Order 2023
657	The Inspectors of Education, Children's Services and Skills (No. 2) Order 2023
658	The Restriction of the Use of Certain Hazardous Substances in Electrical and Electronic Equipment (Amendment) Regulations 2023
659	The Exempt Charities Order 2023
660	The Little Crow Solar Park (Amendment) Order 2023
661	The Free Zone (Customs Site No. 2 Solent) Designation Order 2023
662	The Civil Aviation (Investigation of Air Accidents and Incidents) (Guernsey) Order 2023
663	The Air Navigation (Restriction of Flying) (Nottingham) (Emergency) (Revocation) Regulations 2023
664	The Scotland Act 2016 (Social Security) (Disability Living Allowance) (Amendment) Regulations 2023
665	The Russia (Sanctions) (EU Exit) (Amendment) (No. 2) Regulations 2023
666	The Motor Vehicles (Driving Licences) (Amendment) Regulations 2023
667	The A47 Wansford to Sutton (Corrections) Order 2023
668	The Justice and Security (Northern Ireland) Act 2007 (Extension of Duration of Non-jury Trial Provisions) Order 2023
669	The Air Navigation (Restriction of Flying) (Lytham St Annes) (Amendment) Regulations 2023
670	The Air Navigation (Restriction of Flying) (Finsbury Park) Regulations 2023
671	The Air Navigation (Restriction of Flying) (Duxford) (No. 3) Regulations 2023
672	The Air Navigation (Restriction of Flying) (Dirleton) Regulations 2023
673	The Air Navigation (Restriction of Flying) (The Palace of Holyroodhouse) (Amendment) Regulations 2023
674	The Air Navigation (Restriction of Flying) (Nottingham Riverside Festival) Regulations 2023
675	The Cornwall Harbours Harbour Revision Order 2023
676	The Seed Marketing (Heterogeneous Material) (Temporary Experiment) (England) Regulations 2023
677	The Strategic Highways Company (Name Change and Consequential Amendments) Regulations 2023
678 (W. 100)	The Feed Additives (Form of Provisional Authorisations) (Cobalt(II) Compounds) (Wales) Regulations 2023
679 (W. 101)	The A5 Trunk Road (Antelope Roundabout, Bangor, Gwynedd to the Junction of Lon Refail, Llanfairpwll, Anglesey) (Temporary Traffic Prohibitions and Restrictions) Order 2023
680	The Portreath, Portscatho and Portwrinkle Harbour Empowerment Order 2023
681 (W. 102)	The A487 Trunk Road (Parc Menai Roundabout to Antelope Roundabout, Bangor, Gwynedd) (Temporary Traffic Prohibitions and Restrictions) Order 2023
682	Not Allocated
683	The Air Navigation (Restriction of Flying) (Glasgow) Regulations 2023
684	The Air Navigation (Restriction of Flying) (Bournemouth) Regulations 2023
685	The Air Navigation (Restriction of Flying) (Bramham Park) Regulations 2023
686	The Air Navigation (Restriction of Flying) (Doncaster) Regulations 2023
687	The Air Navigation (Restriction of Flying) (Clacton-on-Sea) Regulations 2023
688	The Air Navigation (Restriction of Flying) (Rhyl) Regulations 2023
689	The Feed Additives (Form of Provisional Authorisations) (Cobalt(II) Compounds) (England) Regulations 2023
690	The Dee Estuary Conservancy Harbour Revision (No. 2) Order 2023
691 (W. 103)	The A458 Trunk Road (Broad Street & High Street, Welshpool, Powys) (Temporary Prohibition of Vehicles) (No. 3) Order 2023
692	The Air Navigation (Restriction of Flying) (Jet Formation Display Teams) (No. 2) Regulations 2023
693 (W. 104)	The A55 Trunk Road (Junction 1 (Kingsland Roundabout), Holyhead, Anglesey to east of Junction 11 (Llys y Gwynt Interchange), Bangor, Gwynedd) (Temporary Traffic Restrictions & Prohibition) Order 2023
694	The Amendments of the Law (Resolution of Silicon Valley Bank UK Limited) (No. 2) Order 2023
695	The Export Control (Amendment) Regulations 2023
696	The Register of Overseas Entities (Penalties and Northern Ireland Dispositions) Regulations 2023
697	The Air Navigation (Restriction of Flying) (Leyland) (Emergency) Regulations 2023
698	The Civil Enforcement of Moving Traffic Contraventions Designation Order 2023
699	The Southport and Ormskirk Hospital National Health Service Trust (Dissolution) Order 2023
700 (W. 105)	The A55 Trunk Road (Junction 2 (Tŷ Mawr Interchange), Holyhead, Anglesey to Junction 11 (Llys y Gwynt Interchange), Bangor, Gwynedd) (Temporary Prohibition of Vehicles, Cyclists & Pedestrians) Order 2023

== 701–800 ==
Number	Title
701 (W. 106)	The A4076 Trunk Road (Milford Haven, Pembrokeshire) (Temporary Prohibition of Vehicles) Order 2023
702	The Air Navigation (Restriction of Flying) (Leyland) (Emergency) (Revocation) Regulations 2023
703	Not Allocated
704	The Money Laundering and Terrorist Financing (High-Risk Countries) (Amendment) Regulations 2023
705 (C. 36)	The Police, Crime, Sentencing and Courts Act 2022 (Youth Rehabilitation Order With Intensive Supervision and Surveillance) Piloting Regulations 2023
706 (W. 107)	The A40 Trunk Road (Llandeilo to Llandovery, Carmarthenshire) (Temporary Speed Restrictions & No Overtaking) Order 2023
707	The Air Navigation (Restriction of Flying) (Hillsborough Park) Regulations 2023
708	The Air Navigation (Restriction of Flying) (Royal Air Force Waddington) (No. 5) Regulations 2023
709	The Air Navigation (Restriction of Flying) (The Palace of Holyroodhouse) (Amendment) (No. 2) Regulations 2023
710	The Taxation of Chargeable Gains (Gilt-edged Securities) Order 2023
711	The St. Helens and Knowsley Hospital Services National Health Service Trust (Establishment) (Amendment) Order 2023
712	The Relevant Licensee Nuclear Company Administration (England and Wales) Rules 2023
713	The Russia (Sanctions) (EU Exit) (Amendment) (No. 3) Regulations 2023
714	The Animal By-Products, Pet Passport and Animal Health (Fees) (England) (Amendment) Regulations 2023
715	The Public Service Vehicles (Accessible Information) Regulations 2023
716 (W. 108)	The A483 Trunk Road (Llandovery Road, Llanwrtyd Wells, Powys) (Prohibition of Waiting) Order 2023
717	The Youth Rehabilitation Order (Electronic Monitoring Whereabouts Requirement) (Responsible Persons) Regulations 2023
718	The Direct Payments to Farmers (Eligible Hectares and Afforested Areas) (Amendment) (England) Regulations 2023
719	The Air Navigation (Restriction of Flying) (Folkestone) (No. 2) Regulations 2023
720	The Judicial Appointments (Amendment) Order 2023
721	The Packaging Waste (Data Reporting) (England) (Amendment) Regulations 2023
722	The REACH (Amendment) Regulations 2023
723 (C. 37) (W. 109)	The Health and Social Care (Quality and Engagement) (Wales) Act 2020 (Commencement No. 5) Order 2023
724 (W. 110)	The Equality Act 2010 (Relevant Welsh Authorities) (Amendment) Regulations 2023
725 (W. 111)	The A465 Trunk Road (Westbound Off-Slip Road, Llanfoist Interchange, Monmouthshire) (Temporary Prohibition of Vehicles) Order 2023
726 (W. 112)	The A489 Trunk Road (Cemmaes Road to Machynlleth, Powys) (Temporary Speed Restrictions and No Overtaking) Order 2023
727	The Aviation Security (Air Cargo Agents) (Amendment) Regulations 2023
728 (W. 113)	The A487 Trunk Road (Aberarth, Ceredigion) (Temporary Prohibition of a Left Hand Turn) Order 2023
729	The Persistent Organic Pollutants (Amendment) Regulations 2023
730 (W. 114)	The A48 Trunk Road (Cross Hands Roundabout to Pont Abraham Roundabout, Carmarthenshire) (Temporary Traffic Prohibitions and Restrictions) Order 2023
731	The Basildon (Electoral Changes) Order 2023
732	The Brentwood (Electoral Changes) Order 2023
733 (C. 38)	The Public Order Act 2023 (Commencement No. 1) (England and Wales) Regulations 2023
734	The Longfield Solar Farm Order 2023
735	The Air Navigation (Restriction of Flying) (Reading Festival) Regulations 2023
736	The Air Navigation (Restriction of Flying) (Daresbury) Regulations 2023
737	The Justices’ Allowances (Amendment) Regulations 2023
738 (W. 115)	The A470 Trunk Road (Dinas Mawddwy, Gwynedd) (Temporary Traffic Prohibitions & Restriction) Order 2023
739	The Drivers’ Hours and Tachographs (Amendment) Regulations 2023
740 (W. 116)	The A458 Trunk Road (East of Middletown to Nant-y-Dugoed, Powys) (Temporary Speed Restrictions & No Overtaking) Order 2023
741 (W. 117)	The A470 Trunk Road (Llangurig, Powys to Mallwyd, Gwynedd) (Temporary Speed Restrictions & No Overtaking) Order 2023
742	The Victims’ Payments (Amendment) Regulations 2023
743	The Fruit and Vegetables Aid Scheme Closure (England) Regulations 2023
744	The Data Protection (Law Enforcement) (Adequacy) (Bailiwick of Guernsey) Regulations 2023
745	The Criminal and Civil Legal Aid (Amendment) Regulations 2023
746 (C. 39)	The Public Service Pensions and Judicial Offices Act 2022 (Commencement No. 2) Regulations 2023
747	The Town and Country Planning (General Permitted Development etc.) (England) (Amendment) Order 2023
748	The International Organisations (Tax Exemptions Designation) (Amendment) Order 2023
749 (W. 118)	The A470 Trunk Road (Builth Wells to Llangurig, Powys) (Temporary Speed Restrictions & No Overtaking) Order 2023
750	The Air Navigation (Restriction of Flying) (Southport) Regulations 2023
751	The Social Security (Contributions) (Amendment No. 4) Regulations 2023
752	The Taxes (Base Erosion and Profit Shifting) (Country-by-Country Reporting) (Amendment) Regulations 2023
753	The Building Safety (Responsible Actors Scheme and Prohibitions) Regulations 2023
754 (W. 119)	The Animal By-Products, Pet Passport and Animal Health (Fees) (Wales) (Amendment) Regulations 2023
755	The Safety of Sports Grounds (Designation) (Amendment) (England) (No. 3) Order 2023
756	The Air Navigation (Restriction of Flying) (Finsbury Park) (No. 2) Regulations 2023
757	The Air Navigation (Restriction of Flying) (Cosby) Regulations 2023
758	The Administration of Estates Act 1925 (Fixed Net Sum) Order 2023
759	The Divorce, Dissolution and Separation Act 2020 (Consequential Amendments) Regulations 2023
760	The Road Vehicles (Authorised Weight) (Amendment) Regulations 2023
761 (W. 120)	The A483 Trunk Road (Rhosmaen Street, Llandeilo, Carmarthenshire) (Temporary Prohibition of Vehicles) Order 2023
762	The Air Navigation (Restriction of Flying) (Sandown Air Race) Regulations 2023
763	The Air Navigation (Restriction of Flying) (Topcliffe) Regulations 2023
764	The Cosmetic Products (Restriction of Chemical Substances) Regulations 2023
765	The Air Navigation (Restriction of Flying) (Nottingham Goose Fair) Regulations 2023
766	The Judicial Pensions (Remediable Service etc.) Regulations 2023
767	The Rehabilitation of Offenders Act 1974 (Exceptions) (Amendment) (England and Wales) Order 2023
768	The Firearms (Air Weapons) (England and Wales) Rules 2023
769	The First-tier Tribunal and Upper Tribunal (Chambers) (Amendment) Order 2023
770	The Environmental Offences (Fixed Penalties) (Amendment) (England) Regulations 2023
771	The Air Navigation (Restriction of Flying) (Stansted and Central London) Regulations 2023
772	The Post Office Horizon Shortfall Scheme Top-Up Payments (Tax Exemptions) Regulations 2023
773	The Social Security (Contributions) (Amendment No. 5) Regulations 2023
774	The Customs (Tariff and Miscellaneous Amendments) Regulations 2023
775 (W. 121)	The Valuation Tribunal for Wales (Amendment) Regulations 2023
776	The Northern Ireland (Ministerial Appointment Functions) Regulations 2023
777	The Air Navigation (Restriction of Flying) (Jet Formation Display Teams) (Amendment) Regulations 2023
778	The Boston Alternative Energy Facility Order 2023
779 (C. 40)	The Financial Services and Markets Act 2023 (Commencement No. 1) Regulations 2023
780	The Early Years Foundation Stage (Learning and Development and Welfare Requirements) (Amendment) Regulations 2023
781 (W. 122)	The A44 Trunk Road (Llangurig, Powys to Aberystwyth, Ceredigion) (Temporary Speed Restrictions & No Overtaking) Order 2023
782 (W. 123)	The A470 Trunk Road (Powys/Merthyr Tydfil County Boundary to Builth Wells, Powys) (Temporary Speed Restrictions & No Overtaking) Order 2023
783 (W. 124)	The Traffic Signs (Amendment) (Wales) Regulations and General Directions 2023
784	The Criminal Justice (Specified Class A Drugs) Order 2023
785	The Power to Award Degrees etc. (New College Durham) Order of Council 2017 (Amendment) Order 2023
786 (L. 7)	The Criminal Procedure (Amendment No. 2) Rules 2023
787	The Merchant Shipping (Counting and Registration of Persons on Board Passenger Ships) (Amendment) Regulations 2023
788 (L. 8)	The Civil Procedure (Amendment No. 3) Rules 2023
789 (C. 41)	The Policing and Crime Act 2017 (Commencement No. 12) Regulations 2023
790	The Electronic Money, Payment Card Interchange Fee and Payment Services (Amendment) Regulations 2023
791 (W. 125)	The A489 Trunk Road (Newtown to Caersws, Powys) (Temporary Speed Restrictions & No Overtaking) Order 2023
792 (C. 42)	The Digital Economy Act 2010 (Appointed Day No. 5) Order 2023
793	The Validating Alternative Methods for Salmonella Typing (Amendment) Regulations 2023
794 (W. 126) (C. 43)	The Social Partnership and Public Procurement (Wales) Act 2023 (Commencement No. 1) Order 2023
795	The Transport and Works (Applications, Objections and Inquiries Procedure) (Amendment) (England and Wales) Rules 2023
796	The Fareham (Electoral Changes) Order 2023
797	The Harlow (Electoral Changes) Order 2023
798 (W. 127)	The Packaging Waste (Data Collection and Reporting) (Wales) Regulations 2023
799	The Castle Point (Electoral Changes) Order 2023
800	The Hornsea Four Offshore Wind Farm Order 2023

== 801–900 ==
Number	Title
801	The Higher Education (Assessment Fees) (England) Regulations 2023
802	The M621 Motorway (off side lane prohibition disapplication) Regulations 2023
803	The Home Loss Payments (Prescribed Amounts) (England) Regulations 2023
804	The Air Navigation (Restriction of Flying) (Firth of Forth) Regulations 2023
805	The Goods Vehicles (Licensing of Operators) (Exemptions and Modifications) (Amendment) Regulations 2023
806	The Alcoholic Products (Excise Duty) Regulations 2023
807	The Electoral Commission (Limit on Public Awareness Expenditure) Order 2023
808 (W. 128)	The A465 Trunk Road (Eastbound Carriageway between Ebbw Vale West Interchange, Blaenau Gwent and Glanbaiden Roundabout, Monmouthshire) (Temporary Prohibition of Vehicles, Cyclists and Pedestrians) Order 2023
809 (C. 44)	The Higher Education (Freedom of Speech) Act 2023 (Commencement No. 1) Regulations 2023
810	The Control of Explosives Precursors and Poisons (Amendment) Regulations 2023
811	The Customs (Import Duty) (EU Exit) (Amendment) Regulations 2023
812	The National Insurance Contributions Act 2022 (Freeports and Investment Zones) (Consequential Amendments) Regulations 2023
813	The Relief for Research and Development (Content of Claim Notifications, Additional Information Requirements and Miscellaneous Amendments) Regulations 2023
814	The Designation of Schools Having a Religious Character (England) Order 2023
815	Rother Valley Railway (Bodiam to Robertsbridge Junction) Order 2023
816	The Agriculture (Removal of Cross-Compliance and Miscellaneous Revocations and Amendments, etc.) (England) Regulations 2023
817	The Platform Operators (Due Diligence and Reporting Requirements) Regulations 2023
818	The Transfer Pricing Records Regulations 2023
819	The Epping Forest (Electoral Changes) Order 2023
820	The Cheltenham (Electoral Changes) Order 2023
821 (C. 45)	The Health and Care Act 2022 (Commencement No. 6 and Saving Provision) Regulations 2023
822	The School Teachers’ Incentive Payments (England) (Amendment) Order 2023
823	The Social Security (Contributions) (Amendment No. 6) Regulations 2023
824	The Immigration (Passenger Transit Visa) (Amendment) Order 2023
825	The Education (Designated Institutions in Further Education) (Amendment) Order 2023
826	The Air Navigation (Restriction of Flying) (Firth of Forth) (Amendment) Regulations 2023
827	The Insurance Premium Tax (Amendment) Regulations 2023
828	The National Health Service (Performers Lists) (England) (Amendment) (No. 2) Regulations 2023
829 (C. 46)	The Anti-social Behaviour, Crime and Policing Act 2014 (Commencement No. 1) (Scotland) Order 2023
830	The Access to the Countryside (Coastal Margin) (Aust to Brean Down No. 2) Order 2023
831	The Police Pensions (Remediable Service) Regulations 2023
832	Not Allocated
833	The Dartmouth-Kingswear Floating Bridge (Revision of Charges etc.) Order 2023
834	The A303 (Amesbury to Berwick Down) Development Consent Order 2023
835	The Air Navigation (Restriction of Flying) (Royal Air Force Odiham) Regulations 2023
836	The Cosmetic Products (Restriction of Chemical Substances) (No. 2) Regulations 2023
837	The International Criminal Police Organisation (Immunities and Privileges) Order 2023
838	The Offshore Installations (Safety Zones) Order 2023
839	The Double Taxation Relief and International Tax Enforcement (Brazil) Order 2023
840	The M621 Motorway (Off Side Lane Prohibition Disapplication) (No. 2) Regulations 2023
841	The Double Taxation Relief and International Tax Enforcement (San Marino) Order 2023
842	The Air Navigation (Restriction of Flying) (Saltfleetby, Lincolnshire) Regulations 2023
843	The Firefighters’ Pensions (Remediable Service) Regulations 2023
844 (W. 129)	The M4 Motorway (Junction 23a (Magor), Monmouthshire to Junction 34 (Miskin), Rhondda Cynon Taf) & the A48(M) Motorway (Junction 29 (Castleton), Newport to Junction 29A (St Mellons), Cardiff) (Temporary Prohibition of Vehicles) Order 2023
845	The International Atomic Energy Agency (Immunities and Privileges) (Amendment) Order 2023
846	The Russia (Sanctions) (Overseas Territories) (Amendment) (No. 2) Order 2023
847	The Industrial Training Levy (Engineering Construction Industry Training Board) Order 2023
848	The National Health Service (Ophthalmic Services and Optical Charges and Payments) (Amendment) Regulations 2023
849	The Education (Inspectors of Education and Training in Wales) Order 2023
850	The Greenhouse Gas Emissions Trading Scheme (Amendment) Order 2023
851	The Air Navigation (Restriction of Flying) (Duxford) (No. 4) Regulations 2023
852	The Air Navigation (Restriction of Flying) (Scampton) (Restricted Zone EG R313) (Amendment) (No. 2) Regulations 2023
853	The Commonwealth Development Corporation (Limit on Government Assistance) Regulations 2023
854	The Healthcare (International Arrangements) (EU Exit) Regulations 2023
855	The University Hospitals of Leicester National Health Service Trust (Establishment) (Amendment) Order 2023
856	The Consumer Rights Act 2015 (Enforcement) (Amendment) Order 2023
857	The Air Navigation (Restriction of Flying) (Fishburn Air Race) (Revocation) Regulations 2023
858	The Pensions Dashboards (Amendment) Regulations 2023
859 (W. 130)	The A4076 & A40 Trunk Roads (Haverfordwest to Milford Haven, Pembrokeshire) (Temporary Traffic Prohibitions & Restrictions) Order 2023
860	The Electricity Capacity (Amendment) Regulations 2023
861	The Equipment and Protective Systems Intended for Use in Potentially Explosive Atmospheres Regulations (Northern Ireland) 2017 (Amendment) (Northern Ireland) Regulations 2023
862	The Air Navigation (Restriction of Flying) (Firth of Forth) (Amendment) (No. 2) Regulations 2023
863	The Church Representation Rules (Amendment) Resolution 2023
864	The Legal Officers (Annual Fees) Order 2023
865	The Ecclesiastical Judges, Legal Officers and Others (Fees) Order 2023
866	The Faculty Jurisdiction (Amendment) Rules 2023
867	The Tuberculosis in Animals (England) (Amendment) Order 2023
868 (W. 131)	The M4 Motorway (Junction 42 (Earlswood), Neath Port Talbot to Junction 49 (Pont Abraham), Carmarthenshire) (Temporary Traffic Prohibitions and Restrictions) Order 2023
869	The Armed Forces (Minor Punishments and Limitation on Power to Reduce in Rank) Regulations 2023
870	The Armed Forces (Service Supervision and Punishment Orders) Regulations 2023
871	The Teachers’ Pension Scheme (Remediable Service) Regulations 2023
872	The Postal Packets (Miscellaneous Amendments) Regulations 2023
873	The Electricity and Gas (Energy Company Obligation) Order 2023
874	The Air Navigation (Restriction of Flying) (Darlton) (Emergency) Regulations 2023
875	The Power to Award Degrees etc. (S P Jain London School of Management Limited) Order 2023
876 (C. 47)	The Employment (Allocation of Tips) Act 2023 (Commencement No. 1) Regulations 2023
877	The Air Navigation (Restriction of Flying) (Blackpool) (Amendment) Regulations 2023
878	The Official Statistics Order 2023
879	The Air Navigation (Restriction of Flying) (Scampton) (Restricted Zone EG R313) (Amendment) (No. 3) Regulations 2023
880	The Air Navigation (Restriction of Flying) (Darlton) (Emergency) (Revocation) Regulations 2023
881 (W. 132)	The A483 Trunk Road (Powys/Carmarthenshire County Boundary to Llanymynech, Powys) (Temporary Speed Restrictions & No Overtaking) Order 2023
882	The School Discipline (Pupil Exclusions and Reviews) (England) (Amendment and Transitional Provision) (No. 2) Regulations 2023
883	The Air Navigation (Restriction of Flying) (Royal Air Force Waddington) (No. 6) Regulations 2023
884 (C. 48)	The Finance (No. 2) Act 2023, Part 2 (Alcohol Duty) (Appointed Day, Savings, Consequential Amendments and Transitional Provisions) Regulations 2023
885	The A47 Blofield to North Burlingham Development Consent (Correction) Order 2023
886	The A47/A11 Thickthorn Junction Development Consent (Correction) Order 2023
887	The Electricity (Standards of Performance) (Amendment) Regulations 2023
888 (W. 133)	The M4 Motorway (Junction 24 (Coldra) to Junction 26 (Malpas), Newport) (Temporary Prohibition of Vehicles with a weight in excess of 44 Tonnes) Order 2023
889	The Organic Production (Control of Imports) (Amendment) Regulations 2023
890 (W. 134)	The A479 Trunk Road (Cwmdu, Tretower and Glanusk Park, Powys) (Restricted Road, 30 mph, 40 mph and 50 mph Speed Limits) Order 2023
891 (W. 135)	The A40 Trunk Road (Gibraltar Tunnels, Monmouth, Monmouthshire) (Temporary Traffic Prohibitions & Restrictions) Order 2023
892	The Access to the Countryside (Coastal Margin) (Aust to Brean Down No. 2) Order 2023
893	The Power to Award Degrees etc. (The London Interdisciplinary School Ltd) (Amendment) Order 2023
894	The Social Security (Infected Blood Capital Disregard) (Amendment) Regulations 2023
895	The Building Safety (Leaseholder Protections etc.) (England) (Amendment) Regulations 2023
896	The Windsor Framework (Retail Movement Scheme) Regulations 2023
897 (W. 136)	The Holyhead Harbour Revision Order 2023
898	The Education (Student Loans) (Repayment) (Amendment) (No. 2) Regulations 2023
899 (W. 137)	The A449 Trunk Road (Coldra Interchange, Newport) (Temporary 10 mph Speed Limit and No Overtaking) Order 2023
900	The Business and Planning Act 2020 (Pavement Licences) (Coronavirus) (Amendment) Regulations 2023

== 901–1000 ==
Number	Title
901	The Air Navigation (Restriction of Flying) (Glasgow) (Emergency) Regulations 2023
902	The Air Navigation (Restriction of Flying) (Glasgow) (Emergency) (Revocation) Regulations 2023
903 (W. 138)	The A465 Trunk Road (Westbound Layby at Llanfoist, Abergavenny, Monmouthshire) (Temporary Prohibition of Vehicles) Order 2023
904 (C. 49)	The Neonatal Care (Leave and Pay) Act 2023 (Commencement No. 1) Regulations 2023
905	The Air Navigation (Restriction of Flying) (Clacton-on-Sea) (Amendment) Regulations 2023
906	The Building (Approved Inspectors etc. and Review of Decisions) (England) Regulations 2023
907	The Higher-Risk Buildings (Management of Safety Risks etc.) (England) Regulations 2023
908	The Building Safety Act 2022 (Consequential Amendments etc.) Regulations 2023
909	The Building (Higher-Risk Buildings Procedures) (England) Regulations 2023
910 (W. 139)	The A40 Trunk Road (Raglan to Abergavenny, Monmouthshire) (Temporary Prohibition of Vehicles) Order 2023
911	The Building Regulations etc. (Amendment) (England) Regulations 2023
912	The Public Service Pension Schemes (Rectification of Unlawful Discrimination) (Tax) (No. 2) Regulations 2023
913 (W. 140)	The A4232 Trunk Road (Capel Llanilltern to Culverhouse Cross, Cardiff) (Temporary Prohibition of Vehicles) Order 2023
914 (W. 141) (C. 50)	The Building Safety Act 2022 (Commencement No. 3, Transitional and Saving Provisions) (Wales) Regulations 2023
915 (W. 142)	The A465 Trunk Road (Llangua to Hardwick Roundabout, Abergavenny, Monmouthshire) (Temporary Speed Restrictions & No Overtaking) Order 2023
916 (W. 143)	The A487 Trunk Road (Pembrokeshire/Ceredigion County Boundary near Cardigan, Ceredigion to the Powys/Gwynedd County Boundary at Dyfi Bridge, Powys) (Temporary Speed Restrictions & No Overtaking) Order 2023
917	The M48 Motorway (Severn Bridge Half Marathon) (Temporary Prohibition of Traffic) Order 2023
918 (C. 51)	The Finance (No. 2) Act 2023, Schedule 19 (Trade Remedies) (Appointed Day and Savings) Regulations 2023
919 (W. 144) (C. 52)	The Tertiary Education and Research (Wales) Act 2022 (Commencement No. 2 and Transitory Provision) Order 2023
920	The Tobacco and Related Products (Amendment) (Northern Ireland) Regulations 2023
921 (W. 145) (C. 53)	The Additional Learning Needs and Education Tribunal (Wales) Act 2018 (Amendment of Commencement Orders No. 5, No. 6, No. 8, No. 13 and No. 14) Order 2023
922 (W. 146)	The A40 Trunk Road (Glangrwyney to Pont Wen, Halfway, Powys) (Temporary Speed Restrictions & No Overtaking) Order 2023
923	The A38 Derby Junctions Development Consent Order 2023
924	The Air Navigation (Restriction of Flying) (Notting Hill) Regulations 2023
925	The Air Navigation (Restriction of Flying) (Arbroath) (Revocation) Regulations 2023
926 (W. 147)	The A479 Trunk Road (Glanusk Park to Llyswen, Powys) (Temporary Speed Restrictions & No Overtaking) Order 2023
927	The Air Navigation (Restriction of Flying) (River Thames) Regulations 2023
928	The Access to the Countryside (Coastal Margin) (Bamburgh to the Scottish Border including Holy Island) Order 2023
929	The Air Navigation (Restriction of Flying) (Doncaster) (No. 2) Regulations 2023
930	The Air Navigation (Restriction of Flying) (Derbyshire) Regulations 2023
931	The Air Navigation (Restriction of Flying) (Royal Air Force Waddington) (No. 7) Regulations 2023
932 (W. 148)	The Additional Learning Needs and Education Tribunal (Wales) Act 2018 (Amendment of Commencement Orders No. 5, No. 6, No. 8, No. 13 and No. 14) Order 2023
933	The Air Navigation (Restriction of Flying) (River Thames) (Amendment) Regulations 2023
934 (C. 54)	The Financial Services Act 2021 (Commencement No. 5) Regulations 2023
935 (W. 149)	The A465 Trunk Road (Dowlais, Merthyr Tydfil to Brynmawr, Blaenau Gwent & Glanbaiden to Abergavenny, Monmouthshire) (Temporary Speed Restrictions & No Overtaking) Order 2023
936 (C. 55)	The Financial Services and Markets Act 2023 (Commencement No. 2 and Transitional Provisions) Regulations 2023
937 (C. 56)	The Financial Services and Markets Act 2023 (Commencement No. 3) (Amendment) Regulations 2023
938 (W. 150)	The A479 Trunk Road (Dderw Pitch, Llyswen, Powys) (Temporary Prohibition of Traffic) Order 2023
939	The Power to Award Degrees etc. (New Model Institute for Technology and Engineering) Order 2023
940 (W. 151)	The M4 Motorway (Junction 25A (Grove Park) to Junction 26 (Malpas), Newport) (Temporary Prohibition of Vehicles) Order 2023
941 (W. 152)	The A494 Trunk Road (Bala, Gwynedd) (Temporary Prohibition of Vehicles and 40 MPH Speed Limit) Order 2023
942	The Public Service (Civil Servants and Others) Pensions (Remediable Service) Regulations 2023
943 (W. 153)	The A40 Trunk Road (Raglan Roundabout to Hardwick Roundabout, Abergavenny, Monmouthshire) (Temporary 50 mph Speed Limit) Order 2023
944 (W. 154)	The Local Government Officers (Political Restrictions) (Amendment) (Wales) Regulations 2023
945	The National Health Service (Disapplication of NHS England's Powers of Direction) (England) Regulations 2023
946	Not Allocated
947	The Air Navigation (Restriction of Flying) (Manchester) Regulations 2023
948	The Health and Care Act 2022 (Further Consequential Amendments) Regulations 2023
949	The Food (Promotion and Placement) (England) (Amendment) Regulations 2023
950 & 951	Not Allocated
952	The National Health Service Pension Schemes (Partial Retirement etc.) (Amendment) Regulations 2023
953 (W. 155)	The National Health Service (General Medical Services Contracts) (Wales) Regulations 2023
954	The Trade Remedies (Increase in Imports Causing Serious Injury to UK Producers) (EU Exit) (Amendment) Regulations 2023
955	The Trade Remedies (Dumping and Subsidisation) (Amendment) (No. 2) Regulations 2023
956	The Windsor Framework (Financial Assistance) (Marking of Retail Goods) Regulations 2023
957	The Windsor Framework (Plant Health) Regulations 2023
958	The Customs (Northern Ireland) (EU Exit) (Amendment) Regulations 2023
959	The Windsor Framework (Retail Movement Scheme: Public Health, Marketing and Organic Product Standards and Miscellaneous Provisions) Regulations 2023
960	Not Allocated
961 (W. 156)	The Firefighters’ Pensions (Remediable Service) (Wales) Regulations 2023
962	The Air Navigation (Restriction of Flying) (Liverpool) Regulations 2023
963	The Civil Service (Other Crown Servants) Pension Scheme (Remediable Service) Regulations 2023
964	Not Allocated
965	The Building Safety (Regulator's Charges) Regulations 2023
966	The Financial Services and Markets Act 2000 (Exemptions from Financial Promotion General Requirement) Regulations 2023
967	The Employment Appeal Tribunal (Amendment) Rules 2023
968	The Countryside Stewardship (England) (Amendment) (No. 2) Regulations 2023
969	The Personal Injuries (NHS Charges) (Amounts) (Amendment) (No. 2) Regulations 2023
970 (W. 157)	The M48 Motorway (Junction 23 (Rogiet) to Junction 2 (Newhouse Interchange), Monmouthshire) (Temporary 50 mph Speed Limit) Order 2023
971	The Petroleum Act 1998 (Specified Pipelines) (Amendment) and Importation and Storage of Combustible Gas (Designation of Substance etc.) Order 2023
972	The Local Government Pension Scheme (Amendment) (No. 3) Regulations 2023
973 (W. 158)	The A483 Trunk Road (Newtown Bypass to south of Llaethddu junction, Powys) (Temporary Prohibition of Vehicles) Order 2023
974	The Air Navigation (Restriction of Flying) (Newtown Linford) (Emergency) Regulations 2023
975	The Accounting Standards (Prescribed Bodies) (United States of America and Japan) (Amendment) Regulations 2023
976	The Air Navigation (Restriction of Flying) (New Year Celebrations, London) Regulations 2023
977	The Immigration and Nationality (Fees) (Amendment) Order 2023
978	The Coroners and Justice Act 2009 (Alteration of Coroner Areas) (No. 2) Order 2023
979	The Air Navigation (Restriction of Flying) (Newtown Linford) (Emergency) (Revocation) Regulations 2023
980	The Immigration (Passenger Transit Visa) (Amendment) (No. 2) Order 2023
981	The Electricity (Individual Exemption from the Requirement for a Transmission Licence) (Moray East) (Scotland) Order 2023
982	The Environmental Protection (Plastic Plates etc. and Polystyrene Containers etc.) (England) Regulations 2023
983	The Tonnage Tax (Training Requirement) (Amendment etc.) Regulations 2023
984	The Merchant Shipping (Inspections of Ro-Ro Passenger Ships and High-Speed Passenger Craft) Regulations 2023
985	The National Health Service Pension Schemes (Remediable Service) Regulations 2023
986	The Firefighters’ Pension Schemes (England) (Amendment) Order 2023
987	The Court Funds (Amendment) Rules 2023
988 (W. 159)	The Standards Committees (Wales) (Amendment) Regulations 2023
989 (C. 57)	The Illegal Migration Act 2023 (Commencement No. 1) Regulations 2023
990	The Alcohol Licensing (Coronavirus) (Regulatory Easements) (Amendment) Regulations 2023
991 (W. 160)	The Standards Committees (Grant of Dispensations) (Wales) (Amendment) Regulations 2023
992 (C. 58)	The Building Act 1984 (Commencement No. 3) (England) Order 2023
993 (C. 59)	The Building Safety Act 2022 (Commencement No. 5 and Transitional Provisions) Regulations 2023
994	The Greenhouse Gas Emissions Trading Scheme Auctioning (Amendment) Regulations 2023
995	The Health and Care Professions Council (Miscellaneous Amendment) Rules Order of Council 2023
996 (W. 161)	The A483 Trunk Road (Glanhafren, north of Abermule and Dolfor, Powys) & the A44 Trunk Road (West of Llangurig, Powys) (Temporary 30 mph Speed Limit & No Overtaking) Order 2023
997 (C. 60)	The Finance Act 2009, Sections 101 and 102 (Economic Crime (Anti-Money Laundering) Levy) (Appointed Day) Order 2023
998	The Armed Forces Pensions (Remediable Service) Regulations 2023
999	The Central Counterparties (Transitional Provision) (Extension and Amendment) Regulations 2023
1000	The Free Zone (Customs Site No. 2 Liverpool) Designation Order 2023

== 1001–1100 ==
Number	Title
1001 (C. 61)	The Social Housing (Regulation) Act 2023 (Commencement No. 1 and Saving Provision) Regulations 2023
1002	The Air Navigation (Restriction of Flying) (Remembrance Sunday) Regulations 2023
1003	The Terrorism Act 2000 (Proscribed Organisations) (Amendment) Order 2023
1004	The Immigration and Nationality (Fees) (Amendment) (No. 2) Regulations 2023
1005	The Judicial Discipline (Prescribed Procedures) Regulations 2023
1006	The Value Added Tax (Drugs and Medicines) Order 2023
1007	The Product Security and Telecommunications Infrastructure (Security Requirements for Relevant Connectable Products) Regulations 2023
1008	The Immigration (Notices) (Amendment) Regulations 2023
1009	The Post Office Horizon Shortfall Scheme and Group Litigation Order Compensation Payments (Inheritance Tax Relief) Regulations 2023
1010 (W. 162)	The Rating Lists (Valuation Date) (Wales) Order 2023
1011	The Customs (Safety and Security Procedures) Regulations 2023
1012	The Registered Pension Schemes (Authorised Member Payments) Regulations 2023
1013 (W. 163)	The A483 Trunk Road (Crossgates, Powys) (Temporary Prohibition of Traffic) Order 2023
1014 (W. 164)	The A44 Trunk Road (Between Bwlch Nant yr Arian and Ponterwyd, Ceredigion) (Temporary Prohibition of Vehicles) Order 2023
1015	The Human Medicines (Amendment Relating to Original Pack Dispensing) (England and Wales and Scotland) Regulations 2023
1016	The Whole of Government Accounts (Designation of Bodies) Order 2023
1017	The Social Security Additional Payments (Second Qualifying Day) Regulations 2023
1018	The Financial Services (Gibraltar) (Amendment) (EU Exit) Regulations 2023
1019	The Air Navigation (Restriction of Flying) (State Opening of Parliament) Regulations 2023
1020 (W. 165)	The A5, A55, A494 & A470 Trunk Roads, the B5125 (Chester Road) and an Unclassified Road (North East Wales) (20 mph & 30 mph Speed Limits) Order 2023
1021 (W. 166)	The A470, A487, A494, A458, A5 & A55 Trunk Roads (North West Wales) (20 mph & 30 mph Speed Limits) Order 2023
1022 (C. 62)	The Product Security and Telecommunications Infrastructure Act 2022 (Commencement No. 3) Regulations 2023
1023	The Cannock Chase (Electoral Changes) Order 2023
1024	The North Hertfordshire (Electoral Changes) Order 2023
1025	The Response to the Committee on Climate Change Report (Extension of Period) Order 2023
1026 (W. 167)	The A40, A44, A458, A470, A479, A483, A487 and A489 Trunk Roads (Powys and Ceredigion) (20 mph, 30 mph and 40 mph Speed Limits and De-restriction) Order 2023
1027 (W. 168)	The A40, A48, A483, A477, A487 and A4076 Trunk Roads (Carmarthenshire and Pembrokeshire) (30 mph, 20 mph and Part-Time 20 mph Speed Limits) Order 2023
1028	The Data Protection (Adequacy) (United States of America) Regulations 2023
1029 (W. 169)	The A465 Neath to Abergavenny Trunk Road (Saleyard and Glanbaiden Junctions) (30mph Speed Limit) Order 2023
1030 (W. 170)	The A465 & A470 Trunk Roads (Cwm-gwrach and Resolven Roundabouts, Neath & Swansea Road Roundabout, Merthyr Tydfil) (30mph Speed Limit) Order 2023
1031 (W. 171)	The Spring Traps Approval (Variation) (Wales) Order 2023
1032 (W. 172)	The A48, A40 and A465 Trunk Roads (30 mph Speed Limit) Order 2023
1033	The Awel y Môr Offshore Wind Farm Order 2023
1034	Not Allocated
1035 (C. 63)	The Health and Care Act 2022 (Commencement No. 7) Regulations 2023
1036 (C. 64)	The Coroners and Justice Act 2009 (Commencement No. 21) Order 2023
1037 (W. 173)	The A458 Trunk Road (Broad Street & High Street, Welshpool, Powys) (Temporary Prohibition of Vehicles) (No. 4) Order 2023
1038	The Manston Airport Development Consent (Amendment) Order 2023
1039 (W. 174)	The Health Act 2009 (Commencement No. 4) (Wales) Order 2023
1040	The Income-related Benefits (Subsidy to Authorities) Amendment Order 2023
1041 (W. 175)	The Welsh Language Standards (No. 9) Regulations 2023
1042 (W. 176)	The A487 Trunk Road (Dinas Cross, Pembrokeshire) (Temporary Prohibition of Vehicles) Order 2023
1043 (W. 177	The M4 Motorway (Junction 37 (Pyle Interchange), Bridgend) (Temporary 50 mph Speed Limit) Order 2023
1044	The Diocese of Chichester (Educational Endowments) (Balcombe Church of England Primary School Teacher's House) Order 2023
	The Environmental Civil Sanctions (England) (Amendment) Order 2023
1046	The Environmental Permitting (England and Wales) (Amendment) (England) (No. 2) Regulations 2023
1047 (W. 178)	The National Health Service (Optical Charges and Payments) (Amendment) (Wales) Regulations 2023
1048	The Export Control (Amendment) (No. 2) Regulations 2023
1049 (C. 65)	The Forensic Science Regulator Act 2021 (Commencement No. 2) Regulations 2023
1050 (C. 66)	The Customs (Northern Ireland) (EU Exit) Regulations 2020 (Appointed Day) Regulations 2023
1051	The Power to Award Degrees etc. (Hult International Business School Ltd) Order 2023
1052	The Building (Restricted Activities and Functions) (England) Regulations 2023
1053 (W. 179)	The National Health Service (Ophthalmic Services) (Wales) Regulations 2023
1054	The Sea Fisheries (Amendment) (England) Regulations 2023
1055	The Agriculture and Horticulture Development Board (Amendment) Order 2023
1056	The Windsor Framework (Enforcement etc.) Regulations 2023
1057	The National College for Advanced Transport and Infrastructure (Designated Institution in Further Education and Revocations) (Revocation) Order 2023
1058	The Air Navigation (Restriction of Flying) (Liverpool) (Emergency) Regulations 2023
1059	The Air Navigation (Restriction of Flying) (Liverpool) (Emergency) (Amendment) Regulations 2023
1060	The Social Security (Iceland) (Liechtenstein) (Norway) Order 2023
1061	The Northern Ireland (Ministerial Appointment Functions) (No. 2) Regulations 2023
1062	The Air Navigation (Restriction of Flying) (Liverpool) (Emergency) (Revocation) Regulations 2023
1063	The Access to the Countryside (Coastal Margin) (Iwade to Grain) (No. 2) Order 2023
1064 (W. 180)	The Local Elections (Principal Areas) (Single Transferable Vote) (Wales) Rules 2023
1065	The Air Navigation (Restriction of Flying) (Cheltenham) (No. 2) Regulations 2023
1066	The Local Government and Greater London Authority Elections (Miscellaneous Amendments) Regulations 2023
1067 (W. 181)	The School Teachers’ Pay and Conditions (No. 2) (Wales) Order 2023
1068	The Public Lending Right Scheme 1982 (Commencement of Variations) (No. 2) Order 2023
1069	The Air Navigation (Restriction of Flying) (Bletchley Park) Regulations 2023
1070 (W. 182)	The Water Resources (Control of Agricultural Pollution) (Wales) (Amendment) (No. 2) Regulations 2023
1071	The Health and Care Act 2022 (Further Consequential Amendments) (No. 2) Regulations 2023
1072 (W. 183)	The A483 Trunk Road (Rhosmaen Street, Llandeilo, Carmarthenshire) (Temporary Prohibition of Vehicles) Order 2023
1073	The Air Navigation (Restriction of Flying) (Edinburgh) Regulations 2023
1074	The Aviation Statistics Regulations 2023
1075 (W. 184)	The A5 Trunk Road (Lay-by west of Menai Bridge, Anglesey) (Temporary Prohibition of Vehicles) Order 2023
1076	The A47 North Tuddenham to Easton Development Consent (Correction) Order 2023
1077	The M20 Motorway (Junctions 7 to 11) (Temporary Restriction and Prohibition of Traffic) Regulations 2023
1078	The Air Navigation (Restriction of Flying) (Luton) (Emergency) Regulations 2023
1079 (W. 185)	The Forestry (Felling of Trees) (Amendment) (Wales) Regulations 2023
1080	The School Teachers' Pay and Conditions (England) Order 2023
1081 (C. 67)	The Professional Qualifications Act 2022 (Commencement No. 3 and Savings and Transitional Provisions) Regulations 2023
1082 (W. 186)	The Council Tax (Alteration of Lists and Appeals) (Amendment) (Wales) Regulations 2023
1083	The Local Elections (Northern Ireland) Order 2023
1084	The Child Abduction and Custody (Parties to Conventions) (Amendment) Order 2023
1085	The Inspectors of Education, Children's Services and Skills (No. 3) Order 2023
1086	The Armed Forces Act 2006 (Continuation) Order 2023
1087	The Royal Navy (Ratings) and Royal Marines Terms of Service (Amendment) Regulations 2023
1088	The Chief Inspector of Education, Children's Services and Skills Order 2023
1089	The Air Navigation (Restriction of Flying) (Luton) (Emergency) (Revocation) Regulations 2023
1090	The Immigration (Isle of Man) (Amendment) Order 2023
1091	The Misuse of Drugs Act 1971 (Amendment) Order 2023
1092 (W. 187) (C. 68)	The Agriculture (Wales) Act 2023 (Commencement No. 1 and Savings Provisions) Order 2023
1093 (W. 188)	The A483 Trunk Road (Wind Street, Ammanford, Carmarthenshire) (Temporary Prohibition of Vehicles) Order 2023
1094 (L. 9 )	The Courts and Tribunals (Fee Remissions and Miscellaneous Amendments) Order 2023
1095	The Government of Wales Act 2006 (Schedule 9A – Devolved Welsh Authorities) (Amendment) Order 2023
1096 (W. 189) (C. 69)	The Environment (Wales) Act 2016 (Commencement No. 4) Order 2023
1097	The Armed Forces (Amendment of Court Rules) Rules 2023
1098 (W. 190)	The A55 Trunk Road (Junction 11 (Llys y Gwynt Interchange), Bangor, Gwynedd to the Wales/England Border) and the A494/A550 Trunk Road (Ewloe Interchange to the Wales/England Border, Flintshire) (Temporary Traffic Prohibitions and Restrictions) Order 2023
1099	The Misuse of Drugs (England and Wales and Scotland) (Amendment) Regulations 2023
1100	The Access to the Countryside (Coastal Margin) (East Head to Shoreham) Order 2023

== 1101–1442 ==
Number	Title
1101	The Air Navigation (Restriction of Flying) (Prisons and Young Offender Institutions) (England and Wales) Regulations 2023
1102 (C. 70)	The Armed Forces Act 2021 (Commencement No. 7) Regulations 2023
1103	The Service Custody and Service of Relevant Sentences (Amendment) Rules 2023
1104	The British Nationality (British Overseas Territories) (Amendment) Regulations 2023
1105	The National Health Service Commissioning Board and Clinical Commissioning Groups (Responsibilities and Standing Rules) (Amendment) (No. 2) Regulations 2023
1106 (W. 191) (C. 71)	The Tertiary Education and Research (Wales) Act 2022 (Commencement No. 3) Order 2023
1107 (W. 192)	The A5, A44, A55, A458, A470, A479, A483, A487, A489 and A494 Trunk Roads (Various Locations in North and Mid Wales) (Temporary Prohibition of Vehicles) Order 2023
1108	The Judicial Review and Courts Act 2022 (Magistrates’ Court Sentencing Powers) (Revocation and Amendment) Regulations 2023
1109	The Air Navigation (Restriction of Flying) (Craigo) (Emergency) Regulations 2023
1110	The Town and Country Planning (General Permitted Development) (England) (Amendment) Order 2023
1111	The M621 Motorway (Off Side Lane Prohibition Disapplication) (No. 3) Regulations 2023
1112	The Private Crossings (Signs and Barriers) Regulations 2023
1113 (W. 193)	The School Admission Appeals Code (Appointed Day) (Wales) Order 2023
1114	The National Security (Prohibited Places) (Civil Nuclear) Regulations 2023
1115	The Access to the Countryside (Coastal Margin) (Ramsgate to Whitstable) Order 2023
1116	The Representation of the People and Recall Petition (Northern Ireland) (Amendment) Regulations 2023
1117	The Public Procurement (Agreement on Government Procurement) (Thresholds) (Amendment) Regulations 2023
1118	The European University Institute Regulations 2023
1119 (W. 194)	The A40 Trunk Road (Robeston Wathen Roundabout to Pengawse Hill Junction, Pembrokeshire) (Temporary Traffic Prohibitions and Restrictions) Order 2023
1120 (W. 195)	The A470 Trunk Road (Cemmaes and Cwm Llinau, Powys) (Temporary Prohibition of Vehicles) Order 2023
1121 (C. 72)	The Countryside and Rights of Way Act 2000 (Commencement No. 16) Order 2023
1122	The Air Navigation (Restriction of Flying) (Stansted and Central London) (No. 2) Regulations 2023
1123	The Air Navigation (Restriction of Flying) (Craigo) (Emergency) (Revocation) Regulations 2023
1124	The Courts (Prescribed Recordings) Order 2023
1125 (W. 196)	The School Teachers’ Incentive Payments (Wales) Order 2023
1126	The Countryside and Rights of Way Act 2000 (Substitution of Cut-off Date Relating to Rights of Way) (England) Regulations 2023
1127	The Immigration (Removal Notices) Regulations 2023
1128 (C. 73)	The Police, Crime, Sentencing and Courts Act 2022 (Commencement No. 8) Regulations 2023
1129	The Nationality and Borders Act 2022 (Consequential Amendments) Regulations 2023
1130 (C. 74)	The Nationality and Borders Act 2022 (Commencement No. 7 and Transitional Provisions) Regulations 2023
1131	The Official Controls (Plant Health) (Prior Notification) and Phytosanitary Conditions (Amendment) Regulations 2023
1132	The West Midlands Rail Freight Interchange (Amendment) Order 2023
1133	The Airports Slot Allocation (Alleviation of Usage Requirements) (No. 2) Regulations 2023
1134 (W. 197)	The A494 Trunk Road (Deeside Industrial Park Interchange to the Wales/England Border, Flintshire) (Temporary Prohibition of Vehicles) Order 2023
1135	The Civil Legal Aid (Financial Resources and Payment for Services and Remuneration) (Amendment) Regulations 2023
1136	The Air Navigation (Restriction of Flying) (London, Bletchley and Stansted) Regulations 2023
1137	The Parliamentary Elections and Recall Petition (Welsh Forms) (Amendment) Order 2023
1138	The Elections Act 2022 (Commencement No. 9, Transitional and Savings Provisions and Appointed and Specified Days) and Ballot Secrecy Act 2023 (Commencement) Regulations 2023
1139	The Child Benefit and Tax Credits (Miscellaneous Amendments) Regulations 2023
1140	The Criminal Legal Aid (Remuneration) (Amendment) (No. 4) Regulations 2023
1141	The Mayoral and Police and Crime Commissioner Elections, Recall Petitions and Referendums (Ballot Secrecy, Candidates and Undue Influence) Regulations 2023
1142	The Allocation of Housing and Homelessness (Eligibility) (England) and Persons Subject to Immigration Control (Housing Authority Accommodation and Homelessness) (Amendment) (No. 2) Regulations 2023
1143	The Retained EU Law (Revocation and Reform) Act 2023 (Revocation and Sunset Disapplication) Regulations 2023
1144	The Social Security (Habitual Residence and Past Presence, and Capital Disregards) (Amendment) Regulations 2023
1145 (C. 75)	The Elections Act 2022 (Commencement No. 9, Transitional and Savings Provisions and Appointed and Specified Days) and Ballot Secrecy Act 2023 (Commencement) Regulations 2023
1146	Not Allocated
1147	The Representation of the People (Postal and Proxy Voting etc.) (Amendment) Regulations 2023
1148	The Income Tax (Tax Treatment of Carer Support Payment and Exemption of Social Security Benefits) Regulations 2023
1149 (W. 198) (C. 76)	The Environmental Protection (Single-use Plastic Products) (Wales) Act 2023 (Commencement No. 1) Order 2023
1150	The Representation of the People (Franchise Amendment and Eligibility Review) Regulations 2023
1151	The Armed Forces (Minor Punishments and Limitation on Power to Reduce in Rank) (Amendment) Regulations 2023
1152	The Armed Forces (Disposal of Property) Regulations 2023
1153	The Police Act 1997 (Criminal Record Certificates: Relevant Matter) (Amendment) (England and Wales) Order 2023
1154 (W. 199)	The Non-Domestic Rating Act 2023 (Consequential Amendments to Secondary Legislation) (Wales) Regulations 2023
1155	The Diocese of Canterbury (Educational Endowments) (Detling Church of England Primary School) Order 2023
1156	The Environmental Permitting (England and Wales) (Amendment) Regulations 2023
1157 (W. 200)	The A487 Trunk Road (North of Llanrhystud, Ceredigion) (Temporary Prohibition of Vehicles) Order 2023
1158 (W. 201)	The A470 Trunk Road (Northbound Footway at Betws-y-Coed, Conwy County Borough) (Temporary Closure) Order 2023
1159 (W. 202)	The A40 Trunk Road (Westbound Exit and Entry Slip Roads at Travellers Rest Junction, Carmarthenshire) (Temporary Prohibition of Vehicles) Order 2023
1160	The Air Navigation (Restriction of Flying) (Stansted and Central London) (No. 2) (Amendment) Regulations 2023
1161	The Fluorinated Greenhouse Gases (Amendment) Regulations 2023
1162	The Air Navigation (Restriction of Flying) (London, Bletchley and Stansted) (Amendment) Regulations 2023
1163	The Care Quality Commission (Additional Functions) (Amendment) Regulations 2023
1164	The Dangerous Dogs (Designated Types) (England and Wales) Order 2023
1165 (W. 203)	The A487 Trunk Road (Lay-by at Llanfarian, Ceredigion) (One Way Traffic) Order 2023
1166 (W. 204)	The Commissioner for Older People in Wales (Appointment) (Amendment, Transitional and Revocation) Regulations 2023
1167	The Childcare (Childminder Agencies) (Cancellation etc.) (Amendment) Regulations 2023
1168	The Public Charge Point Regulations 2023
1169	The Public Procurement (Agreement on Government Procurement) (Amendment) Regulations 2023
1170 (C. 77)	The Environment Act 2021 (Commencement No. 7) Regulations 2023
1171	The War Widows Recognition Payment Scheme (Income Tax Exemption) Regulations 2023
1172	The Social Security (Contributions) (Amendment No. 7) Regulations 2023
1173	Not Allocated
1174 (C. 78)	The European Union (Future Relationship) Act 2020 (Commencement No. 3) Regulations 2023
1175	The Council Tax (Chargeable Dwellings and Liability for Owners) (Amendment) (England) Regulations 2023
1176	The Representation of the People (Franchise Amendment and Eligibility Review) (Northern Ireland) Regulations 2023
1177	The Civil Legal Aid (Financial Resources and Payment for Services and Remuneration) (Amendment) Regulations 2023
1178 (W. 205)	The A4076 Trunk Road (Hamilton Terrace, Milford Haven, Pembrokeshire) (Temporary Prohibition of Vehicles) Order 2023
1179 (W. 206)	The Avian Influenza (Miscellaneous Amendments) (Wales) Order 2023
1180 (W. 207)	The A494 Trunk Road (High Street, Bala, Gwynedd) (Temporary Prohibition of Vehicles) Order 2023
1181	The Direct Payments to Farmers (Reconsideration and Appeal) (Modification) (England) Regulations 2023
1182	The Energy Savings Opportunity Scheme (Amendment) Regulations 2023
1183 (W. 208)	The A5 Trunk Road (West of Llangollen, Denbighshire) (40 mph Speed Limit) Order 2023
1184	The Education (Student Loans) (Repayment) (Amendment) (No. 3) Regulations 2023
1185	The Enterprise Act 2002 (Merger Fees and Determination of Turnover) (Amendment) and Energy Network Mergers (Consequential Amendments) Order 2023
1186	The Information as to Provision of Education (England) (Amendment) Regulations 2023
1187	The Hydrocarbon Oil (Marking and Designated Markers) (Amendment) Regulations 2023
1188 (C. 79) (W. 209)	The Non-Domestic Rating Act 2023 (Commencement No. 1) (Wales) Regulations 2023
1189	The Dorset (Electoral Changes) Order 2023
1190	The Financial Services and Markets Act 2023 (Resolution of Central Counterparties: Deferment of Provisions in Resolution Instruments) Regulations 2023
1191	Not Allocated
1192	The Customs (Tariff and Miscellaneous Amendments) (No. 2) Regulations 2023
1193 (C. 80)	The Trade Union Act 2016 (Commencement No. 6) Regulations 2023
1194 (C. 81)	The Judicial Review and Courts Act 2022 (Commencement No. 4) Regulations 2023
1195	The Financial Services and Markets Act 2023 (Resolution of Central Counterparties: Calculation of Maximum Amounts for Cash Calls and Use of Specified Funds) Regulations 2023
1196	The Feed Additives (Authorisations) (England) Regulations 2023
1197	The Town and Country Planning (Fees for Applications, Deemed Applications, Requests and Site Visits) (England) (Amendment) Regulations 2023
1198	The Central Counterparties (Equivalence) (Singapore) (Monetary Authority of Singapore) Regulations 2023
1199 (W. 210)	The Renting Homes (Miscellaneous Amendments) (Wales) Regulations 2023
1200	Not Allocated
1201	The Value Added Tax (Refunds to “Do-It-Yourself” Builders) (Amendment of Method and Time for Making Claims) Regulations 2023
1202	The Customs (Aerodromes and Miscellaneous Amendments) Regulations 2023
1203	The Customs (Additional Duty) (Russia and Belarus) (Amendment) Regulations 2023
1204	The Dangerous Dogs (Compensation and Exemption Schemes) (England and Wales) Order 2023
1205	The Buckinghamshire (Electoral Changes) Order 2023
1206 (C. 82)	The Economic Crime and Corporate Transparency Act 2023 (Commencement No. 1) Regulations 2023
1207	Not Allocated
1208 (W. 211)	The A483 Trunk Road (Rhosmaen Street, Llandeilo, Carmarthenshire) (Temporary Prohibition of Vehicles) (No. 2) Order 2023
1209 (W. 212)	The A458 Trunk Road (Broad Street & High Street, Welshpool, Powys) (Temporary Prohibition of Vehicles) (No. 5) Order 2023
1210 (W. 213)	The Building Safety (Description of Higher-Risk Building) (Design and Construction Phase) (Wales) Regulations 2023
1211 (W. 214)	The Allocation of Housing and Homelessness (Eligibility) (Wales) (Amendment) (No. 3) Regulations 2023
1212	The Education (Inspectors of Education and Training in Wales) (No. 2) Order 2023
1213	The Inspectors of Education, Children's Services and Skills (No. 4) Order 2023
1214	The Carer's Assistance (Carer Support Payment) (Scotland) Regulations 2023 (Consequential Modifications) Order 2023
1215 (C. 84)	The Immigration Act 2014 (Commencement No. 8) Order 2023
1216	The Merchant Shipping (Small Workboats and Pilot Boats) Regulations 2023
1217	The Persistent Organic Pollutants (Amendment) (No. 2) Regulations 2023
1218	The Carer's Assistance (Carer Support Payment) (Scotland) Regulations 2023 (Consequential Amendments) Order 2023
1219	The British Nationality (Eswatini, Gabon and Togo) Order 2023
1220	The Electronic Communications Code (Jurisdiction) (Amendment) Regulations 2023
1221	The Data Protection (Law Enforcement) (Adequacy) (Bailiwick of Jersey) Regulations 2023
1222 (C. 85)	The Nationality and Borders Act 2022 (Commencement No. 8) Regulations 2023
1223 (W. 215)	The A487 Trunk Road (Bridge Street, Great Darkgate Street & Owain Glyndwr Square, Aberystwyth, Ceredigion) (Temporary Prohibition of Vehicles) Order 2023
1224 (W. 216)	The A48 Trunk Road (Eastbound Exit Slip Road at Cwmgwilli, Carmarthenshire) (Temporary Prohibition of Vehicles) Order 2023
1225	The Representation of the People (Postal Vote Handling and Secrecy) (Amendment) Regulations 2023
1226	The Climate Change Agreements (Administration and Eligible Facilities) (Amendment) Regulations 2023
1227	The Police and Crime Commissioner Elections (Amendment) Order 2023
1228	The Electricity (Designation of Delivery Bodies) (Transmission) Regulations 2023
1229 (W. 217)	The Valuation for Rating (Plant and Machinery) (Wales) (Amendment) Regulations 2023
1230	The Parliamentary Constituencies Order 2023
1231	The Payments to the Churches Conservation Trust Order 2023
1232 (W. 218)	The Apprenticeships (Specification of Apprenticeship Standards for Wales) (Modification) Order 2023
1233	The Overseas Electors, Postal Vote Handling and Secrecy (Amendment) Rules 2023
1234 (C. 86)	The Elections Act 2022 (Commencement No. 10 and Savings) Regulations 2023
1235	The Representation of the People (Variation of Election Expenses, Expenditure Limits and Donation etc. Thresholds) Order 2023
1236	The Insurance Companies (“The Long-term Business Fixed Capital”) Regulations 2023
1237	The Social Security (Widow's Benefit and Retirement Pensions) (Amendment) Regulations 2023
1238	The Universal Credit (Transitional Provisions) (Amendment) Regulations 2023
1239 & 1240	Not Allocated
1241	The Longfield Solar Farm (Correction) Order 2023
1242 (C. 87)	The Online Safety Act 2023 (Commencement No. 1) Regulations 2023
1243	The Controlled Waste (England and Wales) (Amendment) (England) Regulations 2023
1244	The Producer Responsibility Obligations (Packaging Waste) (Amendment) (England and Wales) Regulations 2023
1245 (C. 88)	The Immigration Act 2014 (Commencement No. 9) and Immigration Act 2014 (Commencement No. 8) (Revocation) Order 2023
1246	The Common Organisation of the Markets in Agricultural Products (Marketing Standards and Organic Products) (Transitional Provisions) (Amendment) Regulations 2023
1247	The Non-Domestic Rating (Heat Networks Relief) (England) Regulations 2023
1248 (C. 89)	The Non-Domestic Rating Act 2023 (Commencement No. 1 and Saving Provision) (England) Regulations 2023
1249	The National Security Act 2023 (Prevention and Investigation Measures) (Polygraph) Regulations 2023
1250	The Non-Domestic Rating (Small Business Rate Relief) (England) Regulations 2023
1251	The Non-Domestic Rating (Consequential and Other Amendments etc.) (England) Regulations 2023
1252	The Dormant Assets (Distribution of Money) (England) Order 2023
1253	The African Swine Fever (Import Controls) (Amendment) (England) Order 2023
1254	The Public Interest Disclosure (Prescribed Persons) (Amendment) Order 2023
1255	The Access to the Countryside (Coastal Margin) (Gretna to Allonby) (No. 1) Order 2023
1256	The Civil Enforcement of Parking Contraventions Designation (No. 2) (West Sussex) (Chichester and Crawley) (Amendment) and the Civil Enforcement of Parking Contraventions Designation Order 2023
1257	The Car, Van and Heavy Duty Vehicle Carbon Dioxide Emissions Performance Standards (Civil Penalties and Miscellaneous Amendments) Regulations 2023
1258	The Short Selling (Notification Threshold) Regulations 2023
1259 (W. 219)	The A4076 Trunk Road (Hamilton Terrace, Milford Haven, Pembrokeshire) (Temporary Prohibition of Vehicles) (No. 2) Order 2023
1260 (W. 220)	The A465 Trunk Road (Hereford Road, Abergavenny, Monmouthshire) (Temporary Traffic Prohibition & Restriction) Order 2023
1261	The Adoption Support Agencies (England) (Amendment) Regulations 2023
1262 (C. 90)	The Animals (Penalty Notices) Act 2022 (Commencement) Regulations 2023
1263	The United Kingdom Internal Market Act 2020 (Services Exclusions) Regulations 2023
1264	The Church of England (Miscellaneous Provisions) Measure 2020 (Commencement No. 3) Order 2023
1265	The Occupational Pensions (Revaluation) Order 2023
1266 (W. 221)	The Water Resources (Control of Agricultural Pollution) (Wales) (Amendment) (No. 3) Regulations 2023
1267	The National Security Act 2023 (Consequential Amendments of Subordinate Legislation) Regulations 2023
1268	The Counter-Terrorism and Security Act 2015 (Risk of Being Drawn into Terrorism) (Revised Guidance) Regulations 2023
1269	The State Pension Revaluation for Transitional Pensions Order 2023
1270	The State Pension Debits and Credits (Revaluation) Order 2023
1271	The Wokingham (Electoral Changes) Order 2023
1272 (C. 91)	The National Security Act 2023 (Commencement No. 1 and Saving Provision) Regulations 2023
1273	The Financial Services and Markets Act 2023 (Panel Remuneration and Reports) Regulations 2023
1274 (W. 222)	The A40, A487, A4076, A477, A48, A483, A465, A470, A4060, A4232, A4042, A449 and A466 Trunk Roads & the A48(M), M4 and M48 Motorways (Various Locations in South and West Wales) (Temporary Prohibition of Vehicles) Order 2023
1275 (W. 223)	The A40 Trunk Road (Haverfordwest Eastern Bypass, Pembrokeshire) (Temporary Traffic Prohibitions & Restrictions) Order 2023
1276 (W. 224)	The Feed Additives (Authorisations) (Wales) Regulations 2023
1277 (W. 225)	The Renting Homes (Wales) Act 2016 and Homelessness (Suitability of Accommodation) (Wales) Order 2015 (Amendment) Regulations 2023
1278	The Slough Multifuel Extension Order 2023
1279	The Town and Country Planning (General Permitted Development etc.) (England) (Amendment) (No. 2) Order 2023
1280	The Tribunal Procedure (Amendment No. 2) Rules 2023
1281 (C. 92)	The Public Order Act 2023 (Commencement No. 2) (England and Wales) Regulations 2023
1282	The Air Navigation (Restriction of Flying) (Edinburgh) (Amendment) Regulations 2023
1283 (C. 93)	The Carer's Leave Act 2023 (Commencement) Regulations 2023
1284	The African Development Bank (Sixteenth Replenishment of the African Development Fund) Order 2023
1285	The Design Right, Artist's Resale Right and Copyright (Amendment) Regulations 2023
1286	The Recognition of Professional Qualifications and Implementation of International Recognition Agreements (Amendment) Regulations 2023
1287	The Intellectual Property (Exhaustion of Rights) (Amendment) Regulations 2023
1288 (W. 226)	The Environmental Protection (Single-use Plastic Products) (Civil Sanctions) (Wales) Regulations 2023
1289 (W. 227)	The Prohibition on the Incineration, or the Deposit in Landfill, of Specified Waste (Wales) Regulations 2023
1290 (W. 228)	The Waste Separation Requirements (Wales) Regulations 2023
1291	The African Development Fund (Multilateral Debt Relief Initiative) (Amendment) Order 2023
1292 (W. 229)	The Non-Domestic Rating Contributions (Wales) (Amendment) Regulations 2023
1293 (C. 94)	The Northern Ireland Troubles (Legacy and Reconciliation) Act 2023 (Commencement No. 1) Regulations 2023
1294 (W. 230)	The Recognition of Professional Qualifications and Implementation of International Recognition Agreements (Wales) (Amendment etc.) Regulations 2023
1295	Not Allocated
1296 (W. 231)	The Prohibition on Disposal of Food Waste to Sewer (Civil Sanctions) (Wales) Order 2023
1297	The Air Navigation (Restriction of Flying) (Helicopter Flight) (No.5) Regulations
1298	The Greater London Authority (Consolidated Council Tax Requirement Procedure) Regulations 2023
1299	The Returning Officers (Parliamentary Constituencies) (England and Wales) Order 2023
1300	The Public Interest Merger Reference (Telegraph Media Group Ltd) (Pre-emptive Action) Order 2023
1301	The Political Parties, Elections and Referendums Act 2000 (Non-Party Campaigner Code of Practice) (Appointed Day) Order 2023
1302 (W. 232)	The A458 Trunk Road (Broad Street & High Street, Welshpool, Powys) (Temporary Prohibition of Vehicles) (No. 6) Order 2023
1303 (W. 233)	The Building Control Profession (Charges) (Wales) Regulations 2023
1304 (W. 234)	The Building (Building Control Profession) (Registration, Sanctions and Appeals) (Wales) Regulations 2023
1305	The Parliamentary Elections and Recall Petition (Welsh Forms) (Amendment) (No. 2) Order 2023
1306	The Money Laundering and Terrorist Financing (High-Risk Countries) (Amendment) (No. 2) Regulations 2023
1307	The Branded Health Service Medicines (Costs) (Amendment) (No. 2) Regulations 2023
1308	The Pensions Act 2004 and the Equality Act 2010 (Amendment) (Equal Treatment by Occupational Pension Schemes) Regulations 2023
1309	The Pensions Act 2004 (Amendment) (Pension Protection Fund Compensation) Regulations 2023
1310	The Occupational Pension Schemes (Amendment) (Equal Treatment) (Northern Ireland) Regulations 2023
1311	The Charitable Incorporated Organisations (Notification Requirements: Social Housing) Regulations 2023
1312	The Pensions (Pension Protection Fund Compensation) (Northern Ireland) Regulations 2023
1313	The Resolution of Central Counterparties (Modified Application of Corporate Law and Consequential Amendments) Regulations 2023
1314	Not Allocated
1315	The Air Navigation (Restriction of Flying) (Helicopter Flight) (No. 5) (Revocation) Regulations 2023
1316	The Financial Services and Markets Act 2023 (Resolution of Central Counterparties: Partial Property Transfers and Safeguarding of Protected Arrangements) Regulations 2023
1317	The Green Gas Support Scheme (Amendment) Regulations 2023
1318 (W. 235)	The Representation of the People (Electoral Registers Publication Date) (Wales) Regulations 2023
1319	The Prohibition of Cross-Examination in Person (Fees of Court-Appointed Qualified Legal Representatives) (Amendment) Regulations 2023
1320	The Haiti (Sanctions) (Amendment) Regulations 2023
1321	The Plant Protection Products (Miscellaneous Amendments) Regulations 2023
1322	The Civil Legal Aid (Remuneration) (Amendment) Regulations 2023
1323	The Central Counterparties (Equivalence) (United States of America) (Commodity Futures Trading Commission) Regulations 2023
1324 (L. 10)	The Family Procedure (Amendment No. 2) Rules 2023
1325 (W. 236)	The Register of Service Providers (Prescribed Information and Miscellaneous Amendments) (Wales) Regulations 2023
1326 (W. 237)	The National Health Service (Charges to Overseas Visitors) (Amendment) (No. 3) (Wales) Regulations 2023
1327 (W. 238)	The Regulated Services (Special School Residential Services) (Wales) Regulations 2023
1328	The Flexible Working (Amendment) Regulations 2023
1329 (C. 95)	The Offenders (Day of Release from Detention) Act 2023 (Commencement) Regulations 2023
1330	The Childcare (Free of Charge for Working Parents) (England) (Amendment and Transitional Provision) Regulations 2023
1331	Not Allocated
1332 (W. 240)	The Retained EU Law (Revocation and Reform) Act 2023 (Consequential Amendments) (Wales) Regulations 2023
1333	The Code of Practice (Reasonable Steps for Trade Unions) Order 2023
1334	The Local Government and Greater London Authority Elections (Amendment) Rules 2023
1335	The Strikes (Minimum Service Levels: Passenger Railway Services) Regulations 2023
1336 (W. 241)	The Regulated Services (Registration) (Wales) (Amendment) Regulations 2023
1337 (W. 242)	The Apprenticeships (Specification of Apprenticeship Standards for Wales) (Modification) (Revocation) Order 2023
1338	The Early Years Foundation Stage (Learning and Development, Early Years Register and Welfare Requirements) (Amendment) Regulations 2023
1339	The Customs Tariff (Miscellaneous Amendments) Regulations 2023
1340	The Health Protection (Coronavirus, Testing Requirements and Standards) (England) (Amendment and Transitional Provision) Regulations 2023
1341	The Value Added Tax (Women's Sanitary Products: Reusable Underwear) Order 2023
1342	The Stockton-on-Tees (Electoral Changes) Order 2023
1343	The Strikes (Minimum Service Levels: NHS Ambulance Services and the NHS Patient Transport Service) Regulations 2023
1344	The Classification, Labelling and Packaging of Substances and Mixtures (Amendment and Consequential Provision) Regulations 2023
1345	The Misuse of Drugs (England and Wales and Scotland) (Amendment) (No. 2) Regulations 2023
1346	The Insurance and Reinsurance Undertakings (Prudential Requirements) (Risk Margin) Regulations 2023
1347	The Insurance and Reinsurance Undertakings (Prudential Requirements) Regulations 2023
1348	The Health Care Services (Provider Selection Regime) Regulations 2023
1349 (W. 243)	The Education (Student Finance) (Miscellaneous Amendments) (No. 3) (Wales) Regulations 2023
1350	The Animals (Penalty Notices) (England) Regulations 2023
1351	The Air Navigation (Restriction of Flying) (Moreton in Marsh) (No. 2) Regulations 2023
1352	The Social Security Additional Payments (Third Qualifying Day) Regulations 2023
1353	The Strikes (Minimum Service Levels: Border Security) Regulations 2023
1354 (W. 244)	The Non-Domestic Rating (Improvement Relief) (Wales) Regulations 2023
1355 (W. 245)	The Local Authority Social Services Annual Reports (Prescribed Form) (Wales) (Amendment and Transitional Provision) Regulations 2023
1356	The Court Funds (Amendment No. 2) Rules 2023
1357	The Non-Domestic Rating (Improvement Relief) (England) Regulations 2023
1358	The Air Navigation (Restriction of Flying) (Cheltenham) (No. 3) Regulations 2023
1359	The Immigration and Nationality (Fees) (Amendment) (No. 3) Regulations 2023
1360	The Government Resources and Accounts Act 2000 (Estimates and Accounts) (Amendment) Order 2023
1361	The Superannuation (Admission to Schedule 1 to the Superannuation Act 1972) Order 2023
1362	The Wine (Revocation and Consequential Provision) Regulations 2023
1363 (C. 96)	The Retained EU Law (Revocation and Reform) Act 2023 (Commencement No. 1) Regulations 2023
1364	The Russia (Sanctions) (EU Exit) (Amendment) (No. 4) Regulations 2023
1365	The Writtle University College Higher Education Corporation (Dissolution) Order 2023
1366	Not Allocated
1367	The Russia (Sanctions) (EU Exit) (Amendment) (No. 5) Regulations 2023
1368	The Criminal Justice Act 2003 (Removal of Prisoners for Deportation) Order 2023
1369	The Public Service Obligations in Transport Regulations 2023
1370	The Aviation (Consumers) (Amendment) Regulations 2023
1371	The Money Laundering and Terrorist Financing (Amendment) Regulations 2023
1372	The Asylum Support (Amendment) Regulations 2023
1373	The Immigration and Asylum (Provision of Services or Facilities) (Amendment) Regulations 2023
1374	The Inspectors of Education, Children's Services and Skills (No. 5) Order 2023
1375	The Visiting Forces (Designation) Order (No. 2) 2023
1376	The Iran (Sanctions) (Isle of Man) Order 2023
1377	The Iran (Sanctions) (Overseas Territories) Order 2023
1378	The Chief Regulator of Qualifications and Examinations Order 2023
1379	The Haiti (Sanctions) (Isle of Man) (Amendment) Order 2023
1380 (W. 246)	The Plant Health etc. (Miscellaneous Fees) (Amendment) (Wales) Regulations 2023
1381	The Major Sporting Events (Income Tax Exemption) (World Athletics Indoor Championships Glasgow 24) Regulations 2023
1382 (C. 97)	The Financial Services and Markets Act 2023 (Commencement No. 4 and Transitional and Saving Provisions) (Amendment) Regulations 2023
1383	The Haiti (Sanctions) (Overseas Territories) (Amendment) Order 2023
1384	The National Security Act 2023 (Video Recording with Sound of Interviews and Associated Code of Practice) Regulations 2023
1385	The Counter-Terrorism and Border Security Act 2019 (Port Examination Code of Practice) Regulations 2023
1386	The National Security Act 2023 (Consequential Amendments of Primary Legislation) Regulations 2023
1387	The Greenhouse Gas Emissions Trading Scheme (Amendment) (No. 2) Order 2023
1388	The Consular Fees (Amendment) Order 2023
1389	The Local Government Finance Act 1988 (Calculation of Small Business Non-Domestic Rating Multiplier) (England) Regulations 2023
1390	The Norfolk Vanguard Offshore Wind Farm (Amendment) Order 2023
1391	The Plant Health etc. (Miscellaneous Fees) (Amendment) (England) Regulations 2023
1392	The Designation of Schools Having a Religious Character (England) (No. 2) (Amendment) Order 2023
1393 (W. 247)	The Water Resources (Control of Agricultural Pollution) (Wales) (Amendment) (No. 4) Regulations 2023
1394	The Vehicle Emissions Trading Schemes Order 2023
1395	The Civil Jurisdiction and Judgments (Saving Provision) Regulations 2023
1396	The Local Audit and Accountability Act 2014 (Commencement No. 7, Transitional Provisions and Savings) (Amendment) Order 2023
1397 (L. 11)	The Civil Procedure (Amendment No. 4) Rules 2023
1398	The Financial Services and Markets Act 2023 (Digital Securities Sandbox) Regulations 2023
1399	The Payment and Electronic Money Institution Insolvency (Amendment) Regulations 2023
1400	The Designation of Rural Primary Schools (England) Order 2023
1401	The Free Zone (Customs Site No. 3 Liverpool) Designation Order 2023
1402	The Health and Social Care Act 2008 (Regulated Activities) (Amendment) Regulations 2023
1403	The St Albans (Electoral Changes) Order 2023
1404	The Health and Social Care Act 2008 (Regulated Activities) (Amendment) (No. 2) Regulations 2023
1405 (C. 98)	The Elections Act 2022 (Commencement No. 11, Transitional Provisions and Specified Day) and Levelling-up and Regeneration Act 2023 (Commencement No. 1) Regulations 2023
1406	The Representation of the People (Overseas Electors etc.) (Amendment) Regulations 2023
1407	The Dangerous Dogs (Exemption Schemes and Miscellaneous Provisions) (England and Wales) Order 2023
1408 (W. 248)	The A40 Trunk Road (Pont Lesneven Roundabout, Carmarthen to St Clears Roundabout, St Clears, Carmarthenshire) (Prohibition of U-Turns) Order 2023
1409	The Financial Services and Markets Act 2023 (Benchmarks and Capital Requirements) (Amendment) Regulations 2023
1410	The Financial Services and Markets Act 2023 (Consequential Amendments) Regulations 2023
1411	The Financial Services and Markets Act 2000 (Financial Promotion) (Amendment) (No. 2) Order 2023
1412 & 1413	Not Allocated
1414 (C. 99)	The Pensions Dashboards (Prohibition of Indemnification) Act 2023 (Commencement) Regulations 2023
1415	The Exotic Disease (Amendment) (England) Order 2023
1416	The Register of Overseas Entities (Verification and Exceptions) (Amendment) Regulations 2023
1417	The Data Protection (Fundamental Rights and Freedoms) (Amendment) Regulations 2023
1418 (C. 100)	The Public Order Act 2023 (Commencement No. 3) (England and Wales) Regulations 2023
1419	The Hydrogen Production Revenue Support (Directions, Eligibility and Counterparty) Regulations 2023
1420 (C. 101)	The Online Safety Act 2023 (Commencement No. 2) Regulations 2023
1421 (W. 250)	The National Health Service (General Medical Services Contracts) (Wales) (Amendment) Regulations 2023
1422	The Police and Criminal Evidence Act 1984 (Codes of Practice) (Revision of Codes A, B, C, D and H and New Code I) Order 2023
1423 (W. 251)	The Tuberculosis (Wales) (Amendment) Order 2023
1424	The Retained EU Law (Revocation and Reform) Act 2023 (Consequential Amendment) Regulations 2023
1425	The Equality Act 2010 (Amendment) Regulations 2023
1426	The Employment Rights (Amendment, Revocation and Transitional Provision) Regulations 2023
1427 (W. 252)	The A4060 Trunk Road (Little Dowlais Roundabout to Abercanaid Roundabout, Merthyr Tydfil) (Temporary Speed Limits) Order 2023
1428 (W. 253)	The A465 Trunk Road (Rhigos, Rhondda Cynon Taff to Aberdulais Interchange, Neath Port Talbot) (Temporary Prohibition of Vehicles, Cyclists & Pedestrians) Order 2023
1429 (W. 254)	The A465 Trunk Road (Llandarcy Roundabout, Neath Port Talbot to Rhigos, Rhondda Cynon Taf) (Temporary Speed Limits) Order 2023
1430	The Agriculture (Delinked Payments and Consequential Provisions) (England) Regulations 2023
1431 (C. 102)	The Health and Care Act 2022 (Commencement No. 8 and Transitional and Saving Provision) Regulations 2023
1432	The York and North Yorkshire Combined Authority Order 2023
1433 (W. 255)	The M4 Motorway (Junction 34 (Llantrisant), Rhondda Cynon Taf to Junction 49 (Pont Abraham), Carmarthenshire) (Temporary Speed Limits) Order 2023
1434 (W. 256)	The A470 Trunk Road (Coryton Roundabout, Cardiff to Cefn Coed Roundabout, Merthyr Tydfil) (Temporary Speed Limits) Order 2023
1435 (W. 257)	The A487 & A40 Trunk Roads (Fishguard, Pembrokeshire) (Temporary Prohibition of Vehicles) Order 2023
1436	The Customs Tariff (Preferential Trade Arrangements) (Amendment) Regulations 2023
1437 (W. 258)	The M4 Motorway (Junction 45 (Ynysforgan) to Junction 46 (Llangyfelach), Swansea) (Temporary 50 mph Speed Limit) Order 2023
1438 (W. 259)	The A470 Trunk Road (Coryton Interchange, Cardiff to north of Taffs Well Interchange, Rhondda Cynon Taf) (Temporary 50 mph Speed Limit) Order 2023
1439 (W. 260)	The A5 Trunk Road (Menai Suspension Bridge, Anglesey and Gwynedd) (Temporary Prohibition of Large Vehicles) Order 2023
1440 (W. 261)	The A55 Trunk Road (Pen-y-clip Tunnel, Conwy County Borough) (Temporary Traffic Prohibitions & Restrictions) Order 2023
1441 (W. 262)	The A470 Trunk Road (Southbound Layby situated north of Betws-y-Coed, Conwy County Borough) (Temporary Prohibition of Vehicles, Cyclists and Pedestrians) Order 2023
1442 (W. 263)	The A487 Trunk Road (Dinas to Newport, Pembrokeshire) (Temporary Traffic Prohibitions and Restrictions) Order 2023
