= United Nations Conference on Trade and Development =

Permanent intergovernmental body

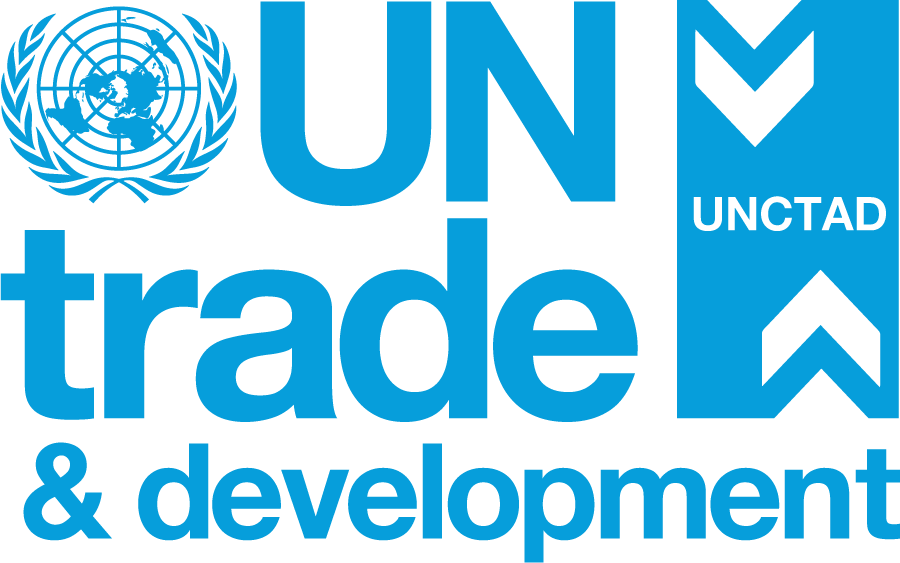
- Abbreviation: UNCTAD
- Formation: 30 December 1964; 61 years ago
- Legal status: Active profit organization
- Headquarters: Geneva, Switzerland
- Head: Rebeca Grynspan (Secretary-General)
- Parent organization: United Nations General Assembly; United Nations Secretariat
- Website: unctad.org

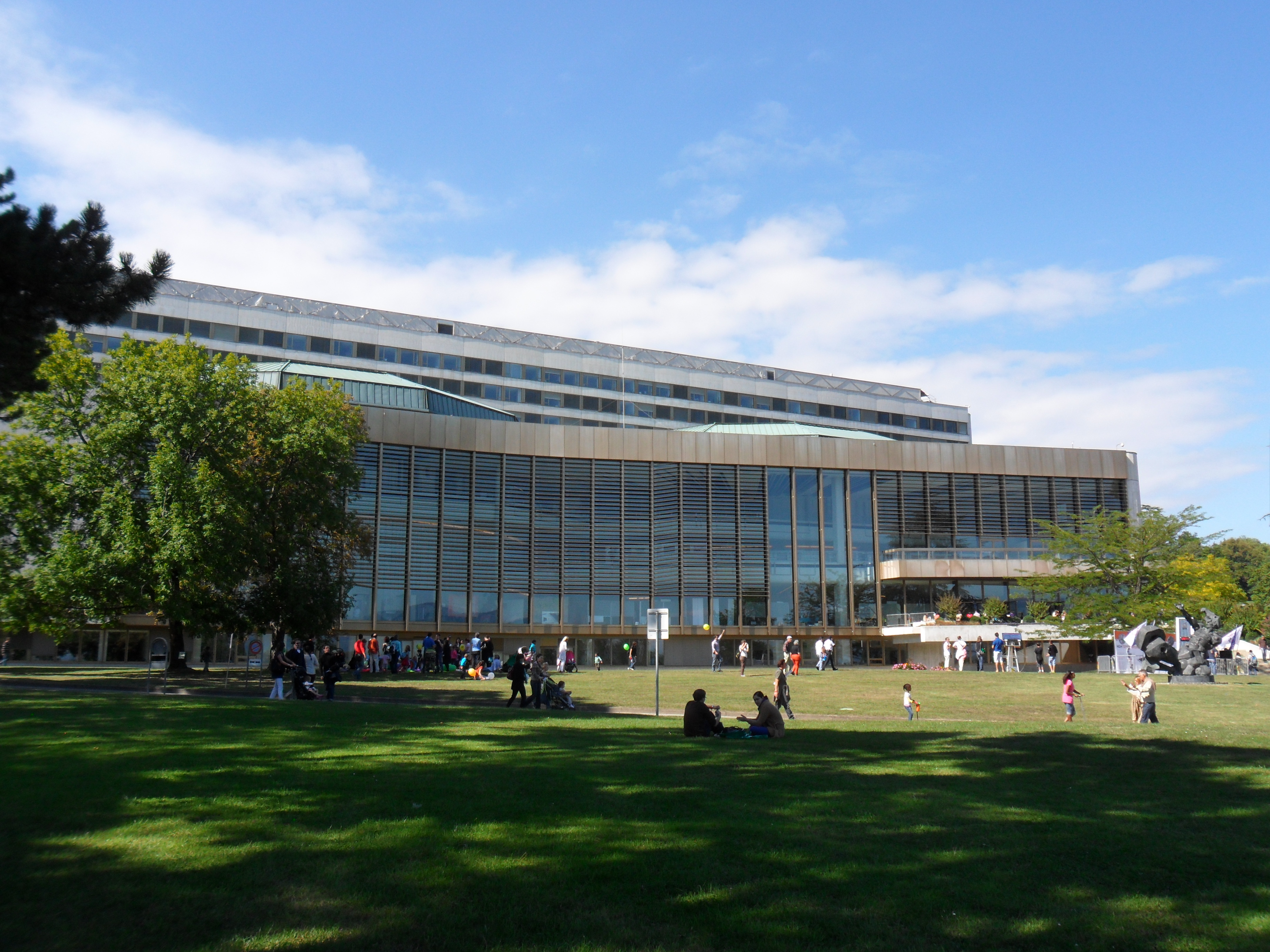
The Headquarters of UNCTAD are located at the Palais des Nations in Geneva.

United Nations Conference on Trade and Development (UNCTAD), abbreviated as UN Trade and Development, is an intergovernmental organization within the United Nations Secretariat which promotes the interests of developing countries in the governance of international trade, financial flows and technology transfer. Its permanent secretariat is located at the United Nations Office at Geneva in Geneva, Switzerland.

It was established in 1964 by the United Nations General Assembly (UNGA) as the United Nations Conference on Trade and Development It reports to both the General Assembly and the United Nations Economic and Social Council (ECOSOC). UNCTAD is composed of 195 member states and works with non-governmental organizations worldwide.

The primary objective of UNCTAD is to formulate policies relating to all aspects of development, including trade, aid, transport, finance and technology. It was created in response to concerns among developing countries that existing international institutions like General Agreement on Tariffs and Trade (since replaced by the World Trade Organization), the International Monetary Fund (IMF), and the World Bank were not properly organized to handle the particular problems of developing countries; UNCTAD would provide a forum where developing nations could discuss and address problems relating to their economic development.

One of UNCTAD's principal achievements was conceiving and implementing the Generalized System of Preferences (GSP), which promotes the export of manufactured goods from developing countries. In the 1970s and 1980s, UNCTAD was closely associated with the New International Economic Order (NIEO), a set of proposals that sought to reduce economic dependency and inequality between developing and developed countries.

UNCTAD conferences ordinarily take place every four years, with the first occurring in Geneva in 1964; fifteen subsequent meetings have taken place worldwide, with the most recent held in Bridgetown, Barbados, from 3–8 October 2021 (albeit virtually, due to the COVID-19 pandemic).

UNCTAD has 400 staff members and a biannual (2010–2011) regular budget of US$138 million in core expenditures and US$72 million in extra-budgetary technical assistance funds. It is a member of the United Nations Sustainable Development Group, a consortium of UN entities that work to promote sustainable socioeconomic development.

== Membership ==
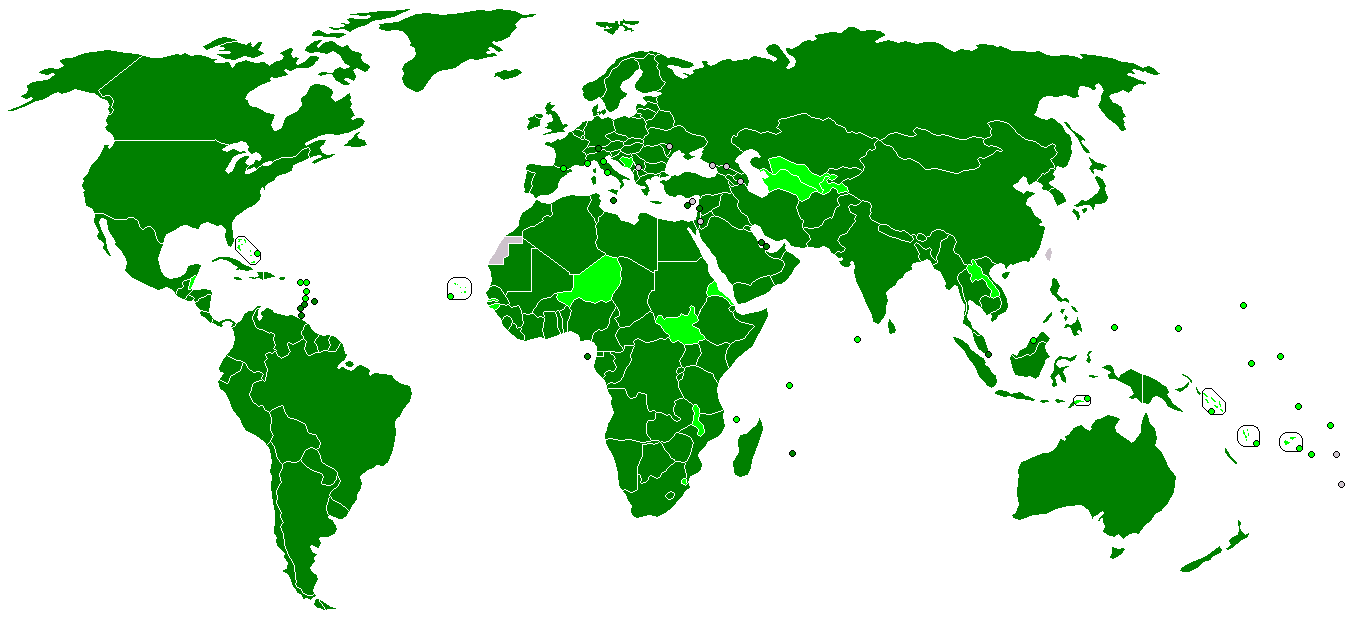
UNCTAD Members UNCTAD Members at the Trade and Development Board

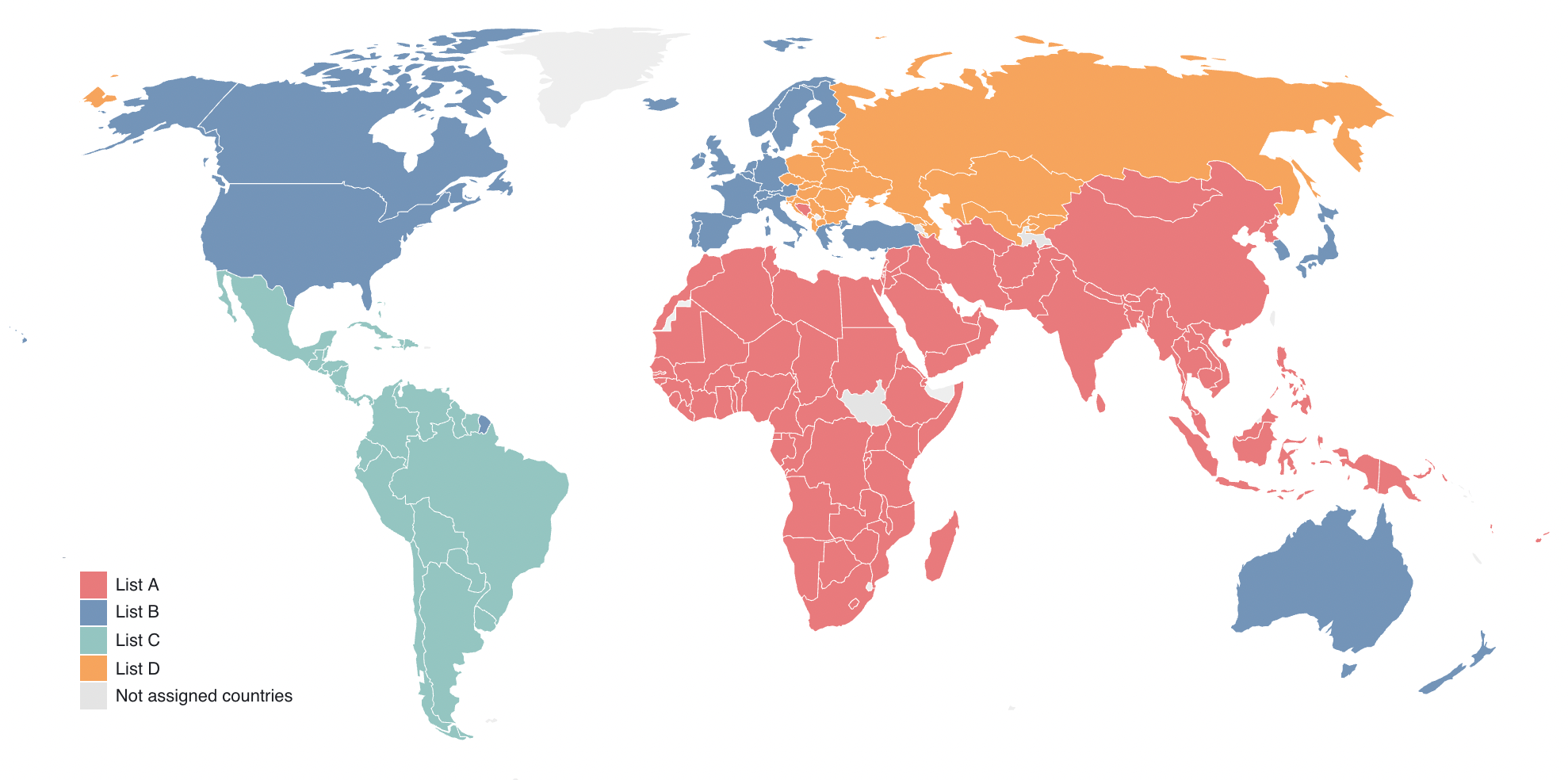
Members, List A Members, List B Members, List C Members, List D Members, to be assigned

UNCTAD has 195 member states: all UN members plus UN Observer states, the Holy See and Palestine. One member state - the United States is in the process of leaving. UNCTAD members are divided into four categories based on United Nations Regional Groups, with six members unassigned: Kiribati, Nauru, Palestine, South Sudan, Tajikistan, and Tuvalu. List A consists mostly of countries in the UN's African Group and Asia-Pacific Group. List B consists of countries of the Western European and Others Group. List C consists of countries of the Group of Latin American and Caribbean States (GRULAC). List D consists of countries of the Eastern European Group.

The lists, originally defined in 19th General Assembly resolution 1995 serve to balance geographical distribution of member states' representation on the Trade Development Board and other UNCTAD structures. The lists are similar to those of UNIDO, a UN specialized agency.

The full list is as follows:

List A (98 members): Afghanistan, Algeria, Angola, Bahrain, Bangladesh, Benin, Bhutan, Botswana, Brunei Darussalam, Burkina Faso, Burundi, Cambodia, Cameroon, Cape Verde, Central African Republic, Chad, China, Comoros, Côte d'Ivoire, Republic of Congo, Democratic Republic of Congo, Djibouti, Egypt, Equatorial Guinea, Eritrea, Eswatini, Ethiopia, Fiji, Gabon, Gambia, Ghana, Guinea, Guinea-Bissau, India, Indonesia, Iran, Iraq, Israel, Jordan, Kenya, Kuwait, Laos, Lebanon, Lesotho, Liberia, Libya, Madagascar, Malawi, Malaysia, Maldives, Mali, Marshall Islands, Mauritania, Mauritius, Micronesia, Mongolia, Morocco, Mozambique, Myanmar, Namibia, Nepal, Niger, Nigeria, North Korea, Oman, Pakistan, Palau, Papua New Guinea, Philippines, Qatar, Rwanda, Samoa, Sao Tome and Principe, Saudi Arabia, Senegal, Seychelles, Sierra Leone, Singapore, Solomon Islands, Somalia, South Africa, Sri Lanka, Sudan, Syria, Tanzania, Thailand, Timor-Leste, Togo, Tonga, Tunisia, Turkmenistan, Uganda, United Arab Emirates, Vanuatu, Viet Nam, Yemen, Zambia, Zimbabwe.

List B (32 members): Andorra, Australia, Austria, Belgium, Canada, Cyprus, Denmark, Finland, France, Germany, Greece, Holy See, Iceland, Ireland, Italy, Japan, Liechtenstein, Luxembourg, Malta, Monaco, Netherlands, New Zealand, Norway, Portugal, San Marino, South Korea, Spain, Sweden, Switzerland, Turkey, United Kingdom, United States. (Note: The US is in the process of withdrawing from UNCTAD)

List C (33 members): Antigua and Barbuda, Argentina, Bahamas, Barbados, Belize, Bolivia, Brazil, Chile, Colombia, Costa Rica, Cuba, Dominica, Dominican Republic, Ecuador, El Salvador, Grenada, Guatemala, Guyana, Haiti, Honduras, Jamaica, Mexico, Nicaragua, Panama, Paraguay, Peru, Saint Kitts and Nevis, Saint Lucia, Saint Vincent and the Grenadines, Suriname, Trinidad and Tobago, Uruguay, Venezuela.

List D (26 members): Albania, Armenia, Azerbaijan, Belarus, Bosnia and Herzegovina, Bulgaria, Croatia, Czech Republic, Estonia, Georgia, Hungary, Kazakhstan, Kyrgyzstan, Latvia, Lithuania, Montenegro, Poland, Moldova, Romania, Russia, Serbia, Slovakia, Slovenia, Macedonia, Ukraine, Uzbekistan.

Not assigned countries (6 members): Kiribati, Nauru, Palestine, South Sudan, Tajikistan, Tuvalu.

Other states that do not participate are Cook Islands, Niue, and the states with limited recognition.

=== Member in the process of withdrawing ===
- United States - In January 2026, United States President Donald Trump announced that the United States would withdraw from the organization.

== Meetings ==
The inter-governmental work is done at five levels of meetings:

- The UNCTAD Conference – held every four years:

UNCTAD XV	Bridgetown	Barbados	3–8 October 2021
UNCTAD XIV	Nairobi	Kenya	17–22 July 2016
UNCTAD XIII	Doha	Qatar	21–26 April 2012
UNCTAD XII	Accra	Ghana	21–25 April 2008
UNCTAD XI	São Paulo	Brazil	13–18 June 2004
UNCTAD X	Bangkok	Thailand	12–19 February 2000
UNCTAD IX	Midrand	South Africa	27 April – 11 May 1996
UNCTAD VIII	Cartagena	Colombia	8–25 February 1992
UNCTAD VII	Geneva	Switzerland	8 Jul – 3 Aug 1987
UNCTAD VI	Belgrade	Yugoslavia	6–30 Jun 1983
UNCTAD V	Manila	Philippines	7 May – 3 Jun 1979
UNCTAD IV	Nairobi	Kenya	5–31 May 1976
UNCTAD III	Santiago	Chile	13 Apr – 21 May 1972
UNCTAD II	New Delhi	India	31 Jan – 29 Mar 1968
UNCTAD I	Geneva	Switzerland	23 Mar – 16 Jun 1964

- The UNCTAD Trade and Development Board – the board manages the work of UNCTAD between two conferences and meets up to three times every year.
- Four UNCTAD Commissions and one Working Party – these meet more often than the board to take up policy, programme and budgetary issues.
- Expert Meetings – the commissions will convene expert meetings on selected topics to provide substantive and expert input for Commission policy discussions.

The 15th quadrennial meeting took place virtually in Bridgetown, Barbados, from 25 to 30 April 2021.

=== Geneva, 1964 ===
In response to developing countries (Least Developed Country, LDC) anxiety at their worsening position in world trade, the United Nations General Assembly voted for a 'one-off' conference. These early discussions paved the way for new IMF facilities to provide finance for shortfalls in commodity earnings and for the Generalised Preference Schemes which increased access to Northern markets for manufactured imports from the South. At Geneva, the LDCs were successful in their proposal for the conference with its secretariat to become a permanent organ of the UN, with meetings every four years. At the Geneva meeting, Raúl Prebisch—a prominent Argentinian economist from the United Nations Economic Commission for Latin America and the Caribbean (ECLAC)—became the organization's first secretary-general.

=== New Delhi, 1968 ===
The New Delhi Conference, held in February and March 1968, was a forum that allowed developing countries to reach an agreement on the basic principles of their development policies. The conference in New Delhi was an opportunity for schemes to be finally approved. The conference provided a major impetus in persuading the North to follow up on UNCTAD I resolutions, in establishing generalized preferences. The target for private and official flows to LDCs was raised to 1% of the North's GNP, but the developed countries failed to achieve the target by a specific date. This has proven a continuing point of debate at UNCTAD conferences.

The conference led to the International Sugar Agreement, which seeks to stabilize world sugar prices.

=== Santiago, 1972 ===
The Santiago Conference, 15 April 1972, was the third occasion on which developing countries confronted the rich with the need to use trade and aid measures more effectively to improve living standards in the developing world. Discussion centred on the international monetary system and specifically on the South's proposal that a higher proportion of new special drawing rights (SDRs) should be allocated to LDCs as a form of aid (the so-called 'link'). In Santiago, substantial disagreements arose within the Group of 77 (G77) despite preconference meetings. There was disagreement over the SDR proposal and between those in the G77 who wanted fundamental changes such as a change in the voting allocations in the South's favour at the IMF and those (mainly the Latin American countries) who wanted much milder reforms. This internal dissent seriously weakened the group's negotiating position and led to a final agreed motion which recommended that the IMF should examine the link and that further research be conducted into general reforms. This avoided firm commitments to act on the 'link' or general reform, and the motion was passed by the conference.

=== Nairobi, 1976, and Manila, 1979 ===
UNCTAD IV, held in Nairobi in May 1976, showed relative success compared to its predecessors. An Overseas Development Institute briefing paper of April 1979 highlights one reason for success as being down to the 1973 Oil Crisis and the encouragement of LDCs to make gains through producers of other commodities. The principal result of the conference was the adoption of the Integrated Programme for Commodities. The programme covered the principal commodity exports and its objectives aside from the stabilisation of commodity prices were: "Just and remunerative pricing, taking into account world inflation", the expansion of processing, distribution and control of technology by LDCs and improved access to markets.

UNCTAD V, held in Manila in 1979 in the wake of the Nairobi Conference, focused on the key issues of protectionism in developing countries and the need for structural change, trade in commodities and manufacturing aid and international monetary reform, technology, shipping, and economic co-operation among developing countries. An Overseas Development Institute briefing paper written in 1979 focuses its attention on the key issues regarding the LDCs' role as the Group of 77 in the international community.

=== Belgrade, 1983 ===
The sixth UN Conference on Trade and Development in Belgrade, 6–30 June 1983, was held against the background of earlier UNCTADs which have substantially failed to resolve many of the disagreements between the developed and developing countries and of a world economy in its worst recession since the early 1930s. The key issues of the time were finance and adjustment, commodity price stabilisation and trade.

=== Bridgetown, 2021 ===
The fifteenth session of UNCTAD was originally scheduled for 2020 but was delayed until 2021 due to COVID-19. This was the first time the conference was held in a Small Island Developing State (SIDS).

== Achievements ==
One of UNCTAD's earliest and most notable accomplishments was the formulation and implementation of the Generalized System of Preferences (GSP), which offered special tariff concessions to exports of manufactured goods by developing countries. Accepting this argument, the developed countries formulated the GSP scheme under which manufacturers' exports and imports of some agricultural goods from the developing countries enter duty-free or at reduced rates in the developed countries. Since imports of such items from other developed countries are subject to the normal rates of duties, imports of the same items from developing countries would enjoy a competitive advantage.

== Reports ==
UNCTAD produces a number of topical reports, including:

- The Trade and Development Report
- The Trade and Environment Review
- The World Investment Report
- The Economic Development in Africa Report
- The Least Developed Countries Report
- UNCTAD Statistics
- Digital Economy Report (formerly known as the Information Economy Report)
- The Review of Maritime Transport
- The International Accounting and Reporting Issues Annual Review
- The Technology and Innovation Report

== Other ==
UNCTAD conducts technical cooperation programmes such as ASYCUDA, DMFAS, EMPRETEC and WAIPA.

In addition, UNCTAD conducts certain technical cooperation in collaboration with the World Trade Organization through the joint International Trade Centre (ITC), a technical cooperation agency targeting operational and enterprise-oriented aspects of trade development.

UNCTAD hosts the Intergovernmental Working Group of Experts on International Standards of Accounting and Reporting (ISAR).

=== Partnership initiatives ===
UNCTAD is a founding member of the United Nations Sustainable Stock Exchanges (SSE) initiative along with the Principles for Responsible Investment, the United Nations Environment Programme Finance Initiative (UNEP-FI), and the UN Global Compact.

== List of secretaries-general and officers-in-charge ==
Nr	Secretary-General	Dates in office	Country of origin	Remarks
1	Raúl Prebisch	1963–1969	Argentina	
2	Manuel Pérez Guerrero	1969–1974	Venezuela	
3	Gamani Corea	1974–1984	Sri Lanka	
4	Alister McIntyre	1985	Grenada	Officer-in-Charge
5	Kenneth K.S. Dadzie	1986–1994	Ghana	
6	Carlos Fortin	1994–1995	Chile	Officer-in-Charge
7	Rubens Ricupero	1995–2004	Brazil	
8	Carlos Fortin	2004–2005	Chile	Officer-in-Charge
9	Supachai Panitchpakdi	1 September 2005 – 30 August 2013	Thailand	
10	Mukhisa Kituyi	1 September 2013 – 15 February 2021	Kenya	
11	Isabelle Durant	15 February 2021 – 11 June 2021	Belgium	Officer-in-Charge
12	Rebeca Grynspan	Since 11 June 2021	Costa Rica	

== See also ==
- Foreign direct investment
- Global System of Trade Preferences among Developing Countries (GSTP)
- International trade
- List of countries by received FDI
- UN Trade and Development III
- United Nations Guidelines for Consumer Protection
- World Development Information Day
- Common System of Tariff Preferences of the Eurasian Economic Union
- Developing Countries Trading Scheme
- Everything but Arms
