= DMO =

DMO may refer to:

== Government ==
- Debt Management Office (disambiguation), several government agencies
- Defence Materiel Organisation, a former agency of the government of Australia
- Dutch Defence Materiel Organisation, now the Materiel and IT Command
- Destination Management Organization, a program of the government of Indonesia; see Tourism in Indonesia#Destination Management Organization
- Directorate of Military Intelligence (United Kingdom), a position at the UK War Office
- District Municipal Office, see municipal governance in India

== Entertainment ==
- Digimon Masters Online, a massively multiplayer online role-playing video game
- Warhammer 40,000: Dark Millennium Online, a multiplayer role-playing video game
- DMO, a character who first appeared in the episode "Be More" of the animated series Adventure Time

== Other uses ==
- Destination marketing organization, an organization that promotes a place in order to increase the number of visitors
- Dilute magnetic oxide, a type of functional semiconducting oxide with applications in Spintronics
- DirectX Media Objects, a multimedia software API from Microsoft
- Domodedovo Airlines, a former airline, headquartered at Domodedovo International Airport in Moscow
- Kemezung language, a language native to Cameroon with ISO 639-3 code dmo
