= Onshore =

Onshore can mean:

- An onshore company is a legal entity that is incorporated in a country to operate a business there; the opposite of offshoring (including reshoring)
- Onshore wind, blowing from a body of water
- Onshore (hydrocarbons), land-based fossil fuels
