= Bemolanga =

Oil field in Madagascar

- Location within Madagascar
- Country: Madagascar
- Location: Morondava Basin
- Offshore/onshore: Onshore
- Coordinates: 17°47′19″S 45°07′15″E
- Operator: Total S.A.
- Partners: Madagascar Oil; Total S.A.

Production
- Estimated oil in place: 16,600 million barrels (~2.26×10^{9} t)
- Recoverable oil: 9,800 million barrels (~1.3×10^{9} t)
- Producing formations: Isalo formation Amboloando formationbr/>Karoo formation

Bemolanga is a large oil sands deposit in the onshore Morondava Basin of Madagascar. The deposit was discovered in the early 1900s but was known to locals for centuries. The field is located north of the Tsimiroro heavy oil field and east of the town of Morafenobe. The field is at 0–30 metres (0–98 ft) depth and about 120 kilometres (75 mi) from the coast.

Madagascar Oil is a license holder of the Bemolanga field with 40% stake belonging to Total S.A. Madagascar Oil describes the field as being a giant bitumen field of 8-13ºAPI low sulphur (<1%) and low vanadium ultra heavy oil. According to DeGolyer and MacNaughton, the field has 16.6 billion barrels (~2.58×10^{9} t) of oil in place (P-50) and 9.8 billion barrels (~1.5×10^{9} t) of recoverable oil (2P+3P). In July 2018, Grynberg Petroleum, a US based company, started considering the acquiring of some interest in the Bemolanga field.

The source rocks for the Bemolanga oil is believed to be the Karoo formation of the Middle Sakamena Shale. The field was lifted to its present near surface location due to the renewed uplifting and seaward tilting of the island of Madagascar, which started in Late Cretaceous (Turonian) and continued throughout the Cenozoic era.

Thirteen wells and over 500 core-holes were drilled from the 1950s to the early 1980s. The hydrocarbons are found in the Isalo and Amboloando formations over an area of approximately 400 square kilometres (150 sq mi). The prospective surface mining area is defined by wherever there is less than 40 metres (130 ft) depth to top oil sand. The average overburden thickness in the surface mining area is around 15 metres (49 ft) (considerably less than average overburden thickness in Canada) and oil saturation is up to 12%.

In September 2008, Total S.A. acquired a 60% interest and operatorship of Bemolanga. It agreed a 2-year program to drill 130 additional core wells at a cost of US$200 million. Total began its own field work in mid 2009, with the start-up of commercial production planned for 2018. If development of the field is successful, it is expected that 2.5 billion barrels (400,000,000 m^{3}) of recoverable resources will be developed to produce 180,000 barrels per day (29,000 m^{3}/d) of oil for more than 30 years.

The Bemolanga field gives its name to the homonymous song by the Malagasy group, Mahaleo.
