= Generalized System of Preferences =

Preferential tariff system

The Generalized System of Preferences, or GSP, is a preferential tariff system which provides tariff reduction on various products. The concept of GSP is distinct from the concept of "most favored nation" (MFN). MFN status ensures equal treatment in the imposition of a tariff where GSP allows for a differential tariff to be imposed on depending upon factors such as a country's development status. Both the rules comes under the purview of the World Trade Organisation (WTO).

GSP provides tariff reductions for the least developed countries.

== History ==
The idea of tariff preferences for developing countries was the subject of considerable discussion within the United Nations Conference on Trade and Development (UNCTAD) in the 1960s. Among other concerns, developing countries claimed that MFN was creating a disincentive for richer countries to reduce and eliminate tariffs and other trade restrictions with enough speed to benefit developing countries.

In 1971, the GATT followed the lead of UNCTAD and enacted two waivers to the MFN that permitted tariff preferences to be granted to developing country goods. Both these waivers were limited in time to ten years. In 1979, the GATT established a permanent exemption to the MFN obligation by way of the enabling clause. This exemption allowed contracting parties to the GATT (the equivalent of today's WTO members) to establish systems of trade preferences for other countries, with the caveat that these systems had to be "generalized, non-discriminatory and non-reciprocal' with respect to the countries they benefited (so-called "beneficiary" countries). Countries were not supposed to set up GSP programs that benefited just a few of their "friends.'

== Effects ==
From the perspective of developing countries as a group, GSP programs have been a mixed success. Most developed countries have generalized their programs by offering benefits to a large swath of beneficiaries, generally including nearly every non-OECD member state. However, every GSP program imposes some restrictions. The United States, for instance, has historically excluded countries from GSP coverage for reasons such as being communist (e.g., Vietnam), being placed on the U.S. State Department's list of state sponsors of terrorism (e.g., Libya prior to 2006), or failing to respect U.S. intellectual property laws.

Most GSP programs are not completely generalized with respect to products. They frequently exclude products of greatest export interest to low-income developing countries lacking natural resources. In the United States and many other developed countries, domestic producers of manufactured goods, such as textiles, leather goods, ceramics, glass, and steel, have long claimed that they could not compete with large quantities of imports. Thus, such products have been categorically excluded from GSP coverage under many programs. These excluded products are often the primary manufactures that developing countries are equipped to export, as they may lack the capital to efficiently produce complex goods like locomotives or telecommunications satellites, but can manufacture textiles.

Despite these limitations, GSP has benefited developing countries, albeit unevenly. For much of its history, GSP has primarily benefited "richer developing" countries—in early years Mexico, Taiwan, Hong Kong, Singapore, and Malaysia, and more recently Brazil and India—while providing less assistance to the world's least developed countries, such as Haiti, Nepal, and nations in sub-Saharan Africa. The U.S. has addressed some of these gaps through supplemental preference programs like the African Growth and Opportunity Act and specific initiatives for Haiti, while the European Union has done the same through the Everything But Arms initiative.

== See also ==
- Global System of Trade Preferences among Developing Countries (GSTP)
- Common System of Tariff Preferences of the Eurasian Economic Union (Armenia, Belarus, Kazakhstan, Kyrgyzstan, Russia)
- Developing Countries Trading Scheme
- Duty Free Tariff Preference (DFTP), a unilateral non-reciprocal preferential tariff scheme provided by the Government of India for the least developed countries (LDCs)
