= Sakamena =

Village in Anosy, Madagascar

Coordinates: 23°19′S 45°47′E

Sakamena is a village near Betroka in the region of Anosy in Madagascar.

Sakamena is also the name of a Permian sedimentary geological formation that has yielded many vertebrate fossil, including Triadobatrachus (the first lissamphibian), Claudiosaurus, one of the first aquatic reptiles, and the Coelurosauravus, the first gliding reptile.

Sakamena is also the name of a coal field that lies near the Sakoa coal field. Both the Sakamena and Sakoa coal fields are under appraisal and development by Madagascar Consolidated Mining, a subsidiary of Red Island Minerals, a company founded by Sam Malin. Other coal fields adjacent to the Sakamena region include the Ianapera, Imaloto and Vohibory fields.
