= Developing Countries Trading Scheme =

System of graduated tariffs on goods

The Developing Countries Trading Scheme ("DCTS") is a British system of graduated tariffs on goods imported to the United Kingdom from many countries of the developing world, including the least developed countries.

The DCTS removes or reduces tariffs and simplifies trading rules. The standard preferences rate is suspended on "standard preferences imports" from 19 June 2023 until 31 December 2025, a period which may be extended.

The Scheme consists of three different regimes – one for least developed countries (LDCs), one for low and lower-middle-income countries which are not LDCs but are deemed to be "vulnerable", and one for other such countries. The DCTS makes it easier for an LDC to move on into the intermediary "Enhanced Preferences" scheme when it "graduates", which means losing LDC status. For most countries, moving out of the list of LDCs will have little impact on trade, and also less than under the previous regime.

== Goods graduation ==
Goods graduation is defined as the suspension of preferential rates of customs duty on imports, which are thus more competitive without trade preferences.

== Legislation ==
Trade Preference Scheme (Developing Countries Trading Scheme) Regulations 2023
- Statutory Instrument
- Parliament of the United Kingdom
- Citation: SI 2023/561

Dates
- Made: 22 May 2023
- Laid before Parliament: 24 May 2023
- Commencement: 19 June 2023

Other legislation
- Made under: Taxation (Cross-border Trade) Act 2018

Text of statute as originally enacted

Customs (Origin of Chargeable Goods: Developing Countries Trading Scheme) Regulations 2023
- Statutory Instrument
- Parliament of the United Kingdom
- Citation: SI 2023/557

Dates
- Made: 22 May 2023
- Laid before Parliament: 24 May 2023
- Commencement: 19 June 2023

Other legislation
- Made under: Taxation (Cross-border Trade) Act 2018

Text of statute as originally enacted

The legal basis of the DCTS is in schedule 3 of the Trade Preference Scheme (Developing Countries Trading Scheme) Regulations 2023 (SI 2023/561) and in the Customs (Origin of Chargeable Goods: Developing Countries Trading Scheme) Regulations 2023 (SI 2023/557). The DCTS replaced the former Generalised Scheme of Preferences (GSP) with effect from 19 June 2023, when all previous goods graduation notices ceased to apply. The outgoing scheme was largely the same as the European Union's.

== Countries affected ==
The DCTS applies to 65 developing countries which have a total population of 3.3 billion people, of whom half are in Sub-Saharan Africa, most of the rest in South Asia.

The countries whose goods are affected are listed in the Standard Preferences framework of the DCTS.

Suspension of the scheme can be applied to goods from these countries, and at the outset some goods coming from India and Indonesia were so excluded.

== See also ==
- Global System of Trade Preferences among Developing Countries (GSTP)
- Common System of Tariff Preferences of the Eurasian Economic Union
- Generalized System of Preferences
- Everything but Arms
