= Enabling clause =

In 1979, as part of the Tokyo Round of the General Agreement on Tariffs and Trade (GATT), the enabling clause was adopted in order to permit trading preferences targeted at developing and least developed countries which would otherwise violate Article I of the GATT. Paragraph 2(a) provides a legal basis for extending the Generalized System of Preferences (GSP) beyond the original 10 years. In practice it gave a permanent validity to the GSP. The enabling clause permits developed countries to discriminate between different categories of trading partners (in particular, between developed, developing and least developed countries) which would otherwise violate Article I of the GATT which stipulates that no GATT contracting party must be treated worse than any other (this is known as most favoured nation treatment). In effect, this allows developed countries to give preferential treatment to poorer countries, particularly to least developed countries. Paragraph 2(c) permits developing countries to enter into preferential trade agreements which do not meet the strict criteria laid out in GATT Article XXIV for regional free-trade agreements. It allows developing countries to enter into agreements which may be non-reciprocal, or cover a very limited range of products (which would otherwise contravene the GATT).
