= Tsimiroro =

Oilfield in Madagascar

- Location within Madagascar
- Country: Madagascar
- Coordinates: 18°21′8″S 45°0′17″E
- Operators: Madagascar Oil

Production
- Estimated oil in place: 9.3 million barrels (~1.3×10^{6} t)

Tsimiroro is a large oil field in the onshore Morondava Basin of Madagascar found south of the Bemolanga ultra heavy oil field and south of the town of Morafenobe. It is estimated to contain as many as 9.3 billion barrels (1.48×10^{9} m^{3}) of heavy oil with 14° to 16° API gravity. The oil is found in the Isalo and Amboloando formations.

Madagascar Oil is the license holder of the Tsimiroro field. It describes the field as being a heavy oil field with a significant volume of oil in place. It gives figures for oil in place (2010 estimates) as:

Oil in Place Volumes billion barrels	Low	Medium	High
Contingent Resources	1.100	1.688	2.459
Prospective Resources	0.991	2.189	6.872
Total	2.091	3.877	9.331

Madagascar Oil is working on a steam flood pilot project as well as continuing drilling operations to expand the proven reserve base. Tsimiroro is believed to be able to achieve at least 80,000 barrels (13,000 m^{3}) to 80,000–100,000 barrels (13,000–16,000 m^{3}) of oil output per day over 35–40 years. First production was realised in March 2008, a year when a total 2,000 barrels (320 m^{3}) were produced.
