= Red Island Minerals =

Australian coal company operating in Madagascar

Red Island Minerals Ltd (RIM) is a Perth Western Australia-based coal development company operating in Madagascar. The company is wholly owned by PTT Asia Pacific Mining Pty Ltd, a subsidiary of PTT Public Company Limited, a state-owned Thai company.

Red Island Minerals was founded by Sam Malin under the name Petrosearch International on 2 March 2005. Its name was changed to Red Island Minerals in 2008.

Red Island Minerals develops the Sakoa coal field in southwestern Madagascar. It operates through its wholly owned subsidiary, Madagascar Consolidated Mining SARL, in which the Malagasy government agency OMNIS holds a minority stake.

== Sakoa Coal Field ==
The Sakoa Coal Field is in the southwest of Madagascar and coal was first discovered in the area in 1908. Small-scale mining was undertaken during World War II. Drilling results indicate that the field is large with a seam measuring up to 12 m (39 ft) thick in places. The product is a thermal coal similar in specification to coal currently being exported by South Africa and is likely to be used in power plants in India and Western Europe. It was estimated in 2015 that 200 million tonnes of coal are recoverable from the field, with an estimated potential resource tonnage of over one billion tonnes. It is expected that the coal will mostly be mined by the open pit method, and that extraction will initially be at the rate of five million tonnes per year.
