= Morondava Basin =

Oil field in Madagascar

Morondava Basin is one of the major sedimentary basins of Madagascar. It encompasses the large Tsimiroro heavy oil field and giant Bemolanga ultra heavy oil field.
