= Tourism in Madagascar =

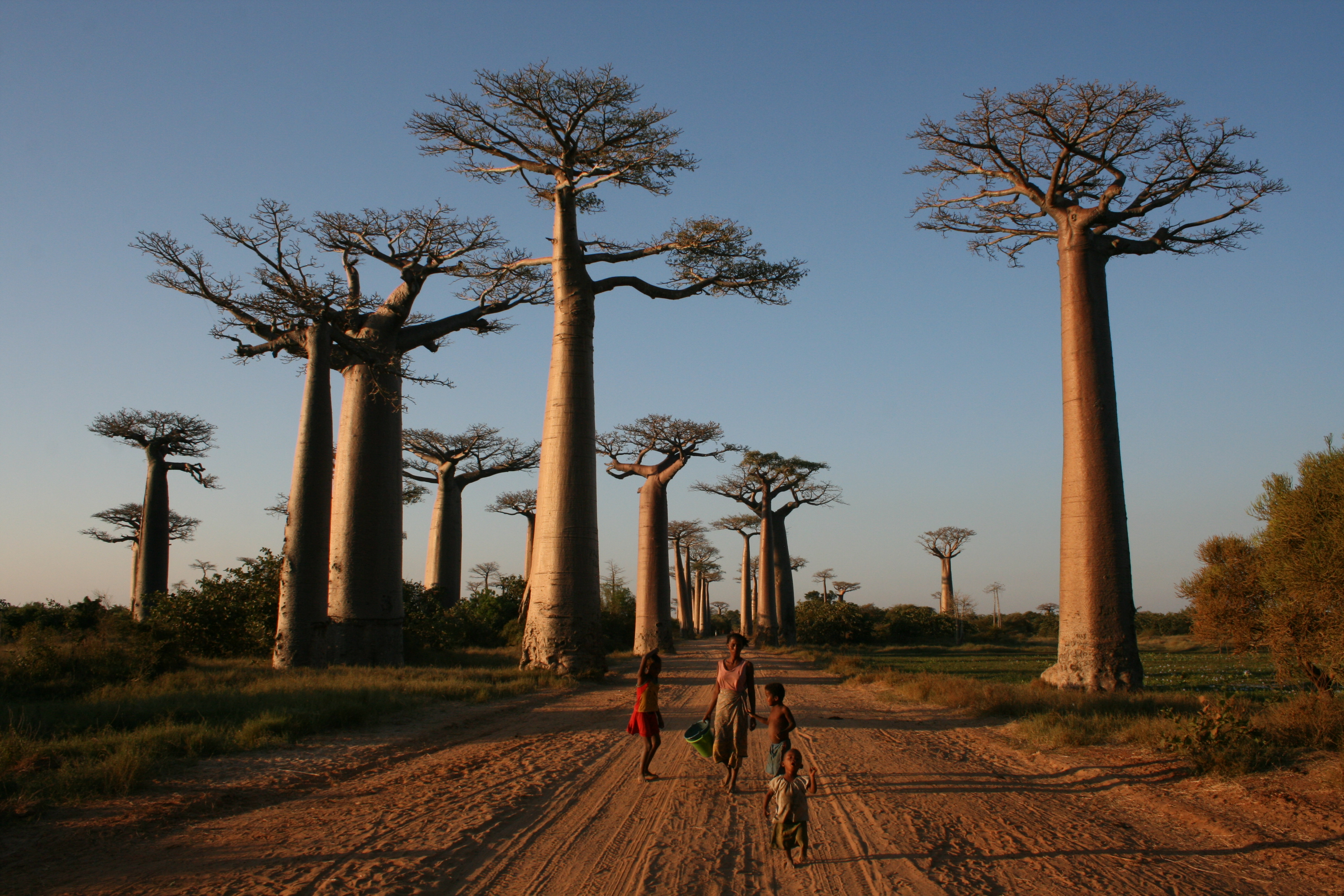
Avenue of the Baobabs, one of the most visited places in the country.

Despite a high potential for tourism, tourism in Madagascar is underdeveloped. Madagascar's tourist attractions include its beaches and biodiversity. The island's endemic wildlife and forests are unique tourist attractions. However, historical sites, craftsmen communities, and relaxed cities make it a favorite with return travellers.

== Tourist attractions ==
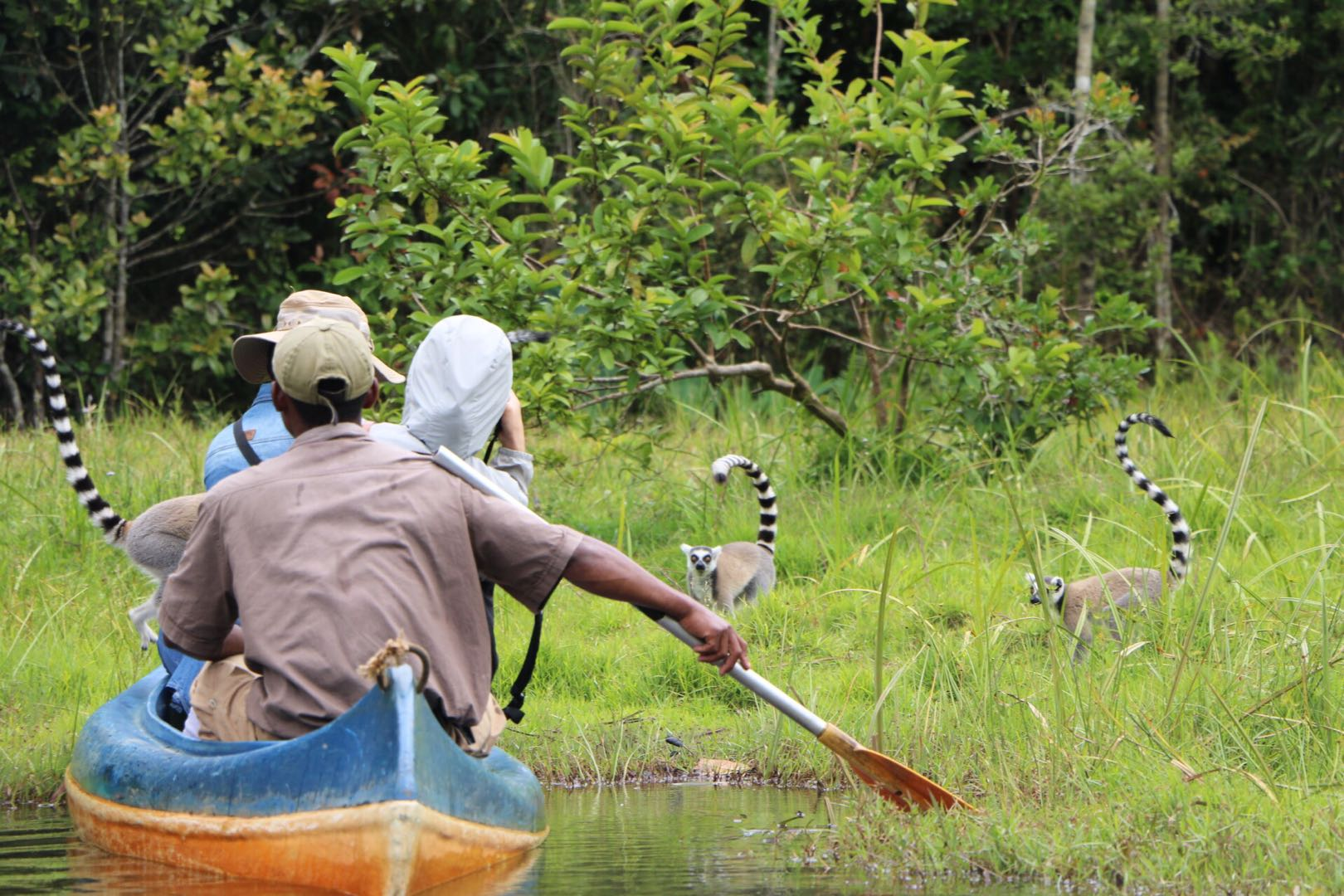
Discovering lemurs

Madagascar has been isolated from the African landmass for approximately 169 million years and its flora and fauna evolved in isolation from that time onwards. The island is one of the world's most biologically diverse areas, and is internationally renowned as a wildlife tourism and ecotourism destination, focusing on lemurs, birds, and orchids. More than half of the island's breeding birds are endemic. Other native species include the red-bellied lemur, the ring-tailed lemur, the crowned lemur, the aye-aye, and the indri (the largest lemur species).

One of the best places to observe the indri is the Analamazoatra Reserve (also known as Périnet), four hours away from the capital. The presence of the indri has helped to make the Analamazoatra Reserve one of Madagascar's most popular tourist attractions.

Historical sites can be found throughout the country, but mostly in the capital, such as the Royal Palace or Rova in Antananarivo or the sacred hill of Ambohimanga nearby, both UNESCO world heritage listed sites. A popular route from Antananarivo to Tulear in the south passes through several towns noted for their handicraft: Ambatolampy (aluminium foundry), Antsirabé (gemstones, embroidery, toys), Ambositra (marquetry), and Fianarantsoa.

== Tourist numbers ==
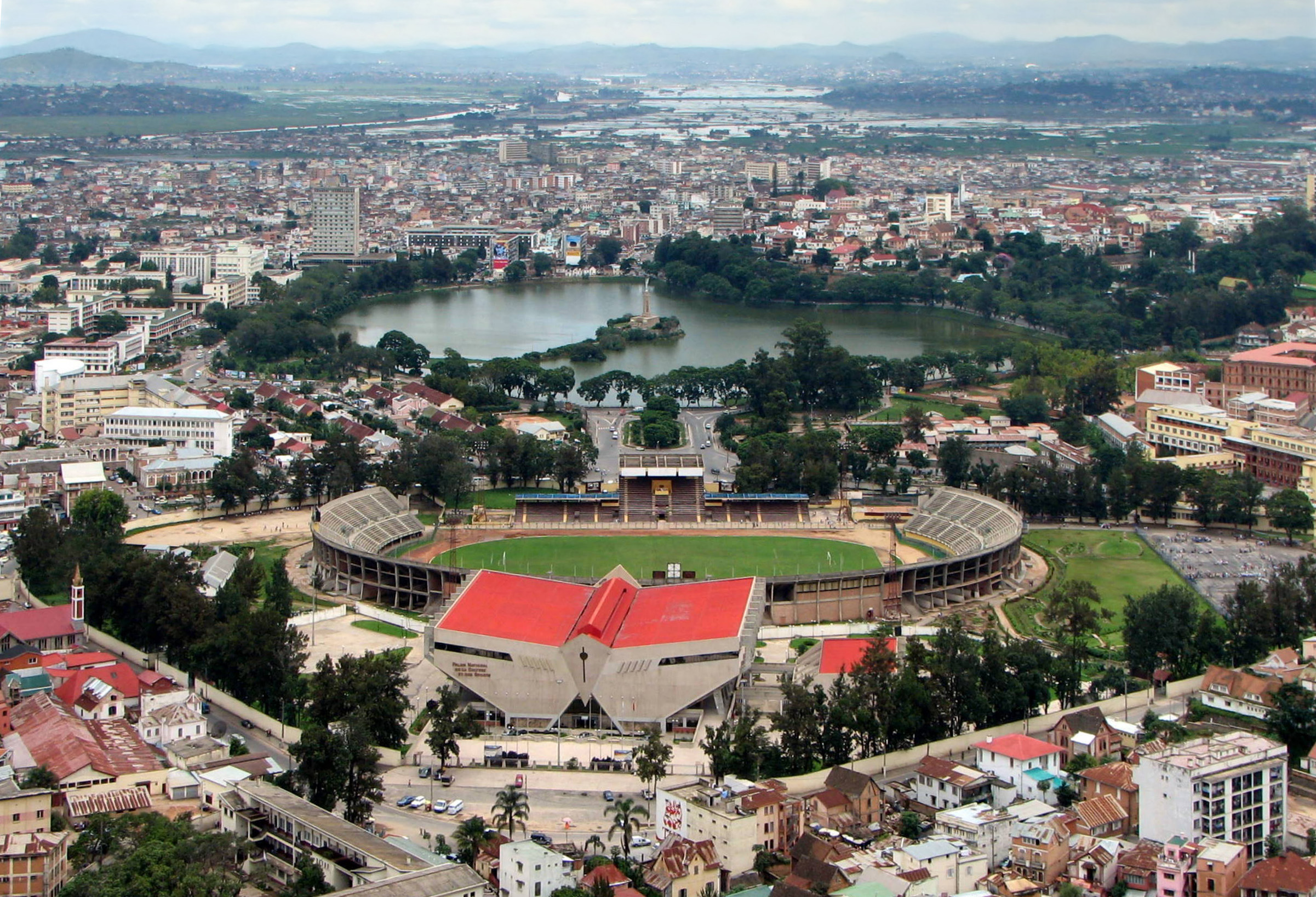
Antananarivo, Madagascar's capital city

312,000 tourists visited Madagascar in 2006. Since 1990, the number of tourists in the country has grown at an average rate of 11% each year. 60% of its tourists are French, who form the majority because of cultural and historical links between the countries, and flight routes. People who are interested in the country's botany, lemurs, birds, or natural history also make up a large part of its visitors. These visitors often travel as part of a tour and stay in the country for a long period of time.

In the mid-1990s, tourism was the country's second largest export earner, bringing in US$50 million annually. For 2007, tourism's contribution to Madagascar's GDP (direct and indirect impact) was estimated to account for 6.3% of GDP and 206,000 jobs (5.1% total employment).

The tourist industry was badly damaged in late 2001 because of a political crisis and following economic recession. The number of tourists in 2002 fell, but the tourism industry subsequently recovered and continued to grow steadily. The highest number of incoming arrivals in Madagascar was recorded in 2008, with 375,000 arrivals. But in 2009 again, a lengthy political crisis affected tourists' arrivals. Only 255,922 tourists set foot in Madagascar in 2012—still an increase of 14% compared to the 2011 numbers. The 2013 figures were again disappointing with 198,816 arrivals—this was an election year, with security issues, notably in Nosy-Be. However, the sector has been growing steadily for a few years; In 2019, 486,000 tourists landed in Madagascar.

== Development of tourism ==
There is growing interest in the country as a tourist destination. The country has beautiful landscapes and the cultural resources to support tourism. These resources provide many opportunities for the development of both ecotourism and resort based tourism. Despite its growth, the tourism industry is very small. It is much smaller than those of the neighbouring Seychelles and Mauritius islands, and is the smallest among the islands in the Indian Ocean.

Madagascar's government has promoted tourism as an economic development strategy. With over 70% of the country living in poverty, tourism is seen as a way to reduce poverty and provide economic growth. Tourism is currently the second-largest foreign exchange earner in the country, and the government hopes to increase this share. Still in the early stages of development, there is large potential for the tourist industry to grow as Madagascar's infrastructure improves.

The tourism industry has a number of large challenges. Travel and tourism is poorly diversified, the infrastructure is poor, roads are poorly paved, and airline travel is expensive and unreliable. There are few high quality hotels, and fewer that meet international standards; Madagascar has approximately 550 hotels, about 110 of which have been classified as meeting international standards.

Air Madagascar and Air France dominate air travel, which makes the price of flights expensive. The country's status as a long-haul destination further increases prices.

In her 1985 travelogue Muddling Through in Madagascar, Irish author Dervla Murphy described the process of obtaining visas to enter:

For British and Irish travellers the nearest source of vias is Paris, where Rachel and I went visa-hunting in April 1983. We were not leaving for Madagascar until June but a prolonged and strenuous hunt seemed likely. In general, the more obscure a country the more convoluted its bureaucracy [..] Toni had spent the previous month gently persuading the Embassy of the Democratic Republic of Madagascar that our summer plans could help the Malagasy tourist trade, which may partly explain why it took us only eighteen minutes to get our visas.

== Visitor statistics ==
Most non-resident visitors arriving to Madagascar were from the following countries of nationality:

Country	2017
France	60,144
Mauritius	3,732
China	3,083
Comoros	2,757
United Kingdom	2,700
Italy	2,691
United States	2,621
South Africa	2,576
Germany	2,570
Switzerland	1,786
