= Everything but Arms =

EU trading arrangement

Least developed countries (designated by the UN as of 2025) Former least developed countries

Everything but Arms (EBA) is an initiative of the European Union (EU) under which all imports to the EU from the least developed countries are duty-free and quota-free, with the exception of armaments. EBA entered into force on 5 March 2001. There were transitional arrangements for bananas, sugar and rice until January 2006, July 2009 and September 2009 respectively. The EBA is part of the EU Generalized System of Preferences (GSP). The up-to-date list of all countries benefiting from such preferential treatment is given in Annex IV of the consolidated text of Regulation (EU) 978/2012.

The aim of the scheme is to encourage the development of the world's poorest countries.

Samoa, having graduated from LDC status in 2014 (becoming instead a developing country), was removed from the list of EBA beneficiaries on 1 January 2019.

On January 16, 2019, the European Commission decided to re-introduce import duties on rice from Cambodia and Myanmar. This was done because imports of Indica rice from both countries combined had increased by 89% in the five previous rice-growing seasons. At the same time, the prices were substantially lower than those on the EU market and had actually decreased over the same period. This surge in low-price imports has caused serious difficulties for EU rice producers to the extent that their market share in the EU dropped substantially from 61% to 29%.

Cambodia lost its EBA status in 2020 over human rights issues.

== History ==
GATT decision IV.D.3, dating back to 28 November 1979, provided the basis for more favourable treatments of least developed countries. The first proposal of an EBA agreement started on 20 September 2000: the European Commission proposed introducing "duty-free, quota-free access for all products from all least developed countries into the EU". The preferential treatment promotes least developed countries (LDC) that, among other things, respect international conventions on human rights; the tariff preferences granted to Cambodia were recently suspended on some products because of "serious and systematic violations of the human rights principles enshrined in the International Covenant on Civil and Political Rights".

== See also ==
- Free trade
- European Union
- Trade and development
- Common Agricultural Policy
- World Trade Organization
- African Growth and Opportunity Act
- Common System of Tariff Preferences of the Eurasian Economic Union
- Developing Countries Trading Scheme
