= Sakoa =

Madagascar region

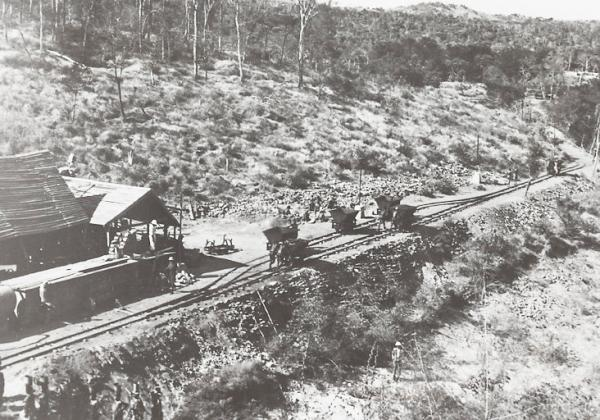
Decauville railway of a coal mine in Sakoa

Sakoa is a region of southwestern Madagascar characterised by dry spiny forest and known particularly for its coal fields, the highest quality of which is the Sakoa field. There are a number of license holders on the field. The vast majority of licenses of commercial value are held by Madagascar Consolidated Mining, a subsidiary of Red Island Minerals, founded by Sam Malin, which is appraising and developing the resources of the field. Pan African Mining holds a considerable number of licenses on the periphery of the field. Other coal fields adjacent to the Sakoa region include the Ianapera, Imaloto, Sakamena and Vohibory fields.

== Sources ==
WWF Dry Forest Programme
