= Debt Management Office =

Debt Management Office may refer to:

- Debt Management Office (New Zealand)
- Debt Management Office (Nigeria)
- Debt Management Office (United Kingdom)
- Public Debt Management Office, a department of Nepal's Ministry of Finance
