= Common Customs Tariff of the Eurasian Economic Union =

Taxes paid on imports into the EAEU

The Common Customs Tariff of the Eurasian Economic Union is customs duty rates imposed by the Eurasian Economic Commission (EEC), a supranational body of the Eurasian Economic Union (Armenia, Belarus, Kazakhstan, Kyrgyzstan, Russia). In addition to a common external tariff, the elements of customs tariff regulation are a common customs nomenclature and common rules for determining the country of origin.

== History ==
The Common Customs Tariff of the Eurasian Economic Community went into force in 2010. This success was at least partly attributable to the economic crisis, which encouraged the three countries to accelerate their integration efforts. In 2011, the EurAsEC Customs Union was already working at full capacity, with economic agents operating within a common customs territory and using the Common Customs Tariff.

On 19 May 2011 Russia, Belarus and Kazakhstan signed a Treaty on the Functioning of the Customs Union within the framework of the Multilateral Trade System. All WTO-inconsistent investment measures, including preferential tariffs or tariff exemptions, applied in relation to the existing automobile investment programmes and any agreements concluded under them would be eliminated by 1 July 2018. No other trade related investment measures inconsistent with the WTO Agreement may be applied after Russia’s accession to the WTO. On 22 August 2012, Russia joined the WTO, becoming the first representative of the EurAsEC Customs Union and Common Economic Space member states in the WTO. At the same time, the Treaty on the Functioning of the Customs Union within the Multilateral Trading System entered into force. This Treaty provides that, from the date of Russia's accession to the WTO, the provisions of the relevant Agreements, as well as the obligations set out in the protocol on Russia's accession to the WTO and relating to legal relations whose regulation within the Customs Union is delegated by Russia to the bodies of the Eurasian Economic Commission, and legal relations regulated by international agreements that constitute the contractual legal framework of the Customs Union, become part of the legal system of the Customs Union. The Eurasian Economic Commission is actively working to ensure the fulfillment of Russia's obligations to the WTO.

The Russian Federation's WTO obligations are implemented in the Common Customs Tariff of the EAEU. The seven-year transition period for Russia's accession to the WTO ended in 2019.

== Exceptions ==
=== Third-country EAEU Agreements ===
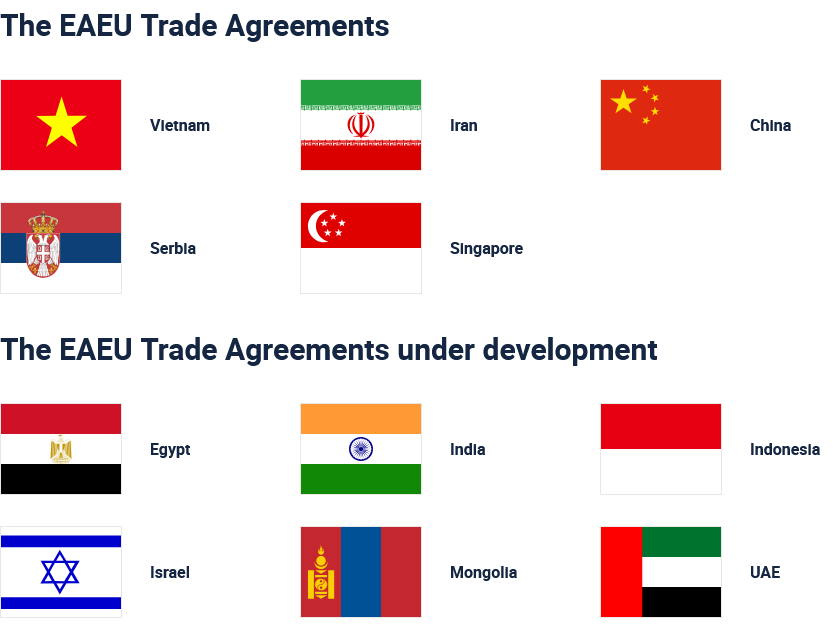
Trade Agreements of the Eurasian Economic Union on the official website in 2024

After 1 January 2015, the members of the EAEU do not have the right to independently conclude a free trade in goods agreements because they delegated their powers to the supranational level according to the Treaty on the Eurasian Economic Union (Article 35).

According to the website of the Eurasian Economic Commission, the EAEU has signed bilateral (one of the parties is the "Eurasian Economic Union and its Member States") agreements with

- Vietnam (signed on 29 May 2015, entered into force on 5 October 2016 and this Free Trade Agreement & Economic Integration Agreement covers trade in goods and trade in services)
- Iran (the Interim Agreement was signed on 17 May 2018, and came into force on 27 October 2019 and this Free Trade Agreement covers trade in goods.) Full FTA signed on 25 December 2023.
- China (signed on 17 May 2018, entered into force on 25 October 2019 and this Agreement is not a free trade agreement at all since it does not provide any reduction in duties, but it creates a legal framework for trade and economic cooperation between the Union as a whole and China and on issues of customs cooperation, technical barriers to trade, sanitary and phytosanitary measures, trade protection measures, issues of electronic commerce, intellectual property, competition and public procurement, as well as sectoral cooperation and the Parties recognize the importance of economic integration in the Asia-Pacific and Eurasia and the importance of conjunction of the Eurasian Economic Union and the Belt and Road Initiative)
- Serbia (signed on 25 October 2019, and entered into force on 10 July 2021 and this Free Trade Agreement covers trade in goods)
- Singapore (the EAEU-Singapore Framework Agreement and the EAEU-Singapore Free Trade Agreement were signed on 1 October 2019)

=== Pre-2015 free trade in goods agreements ===
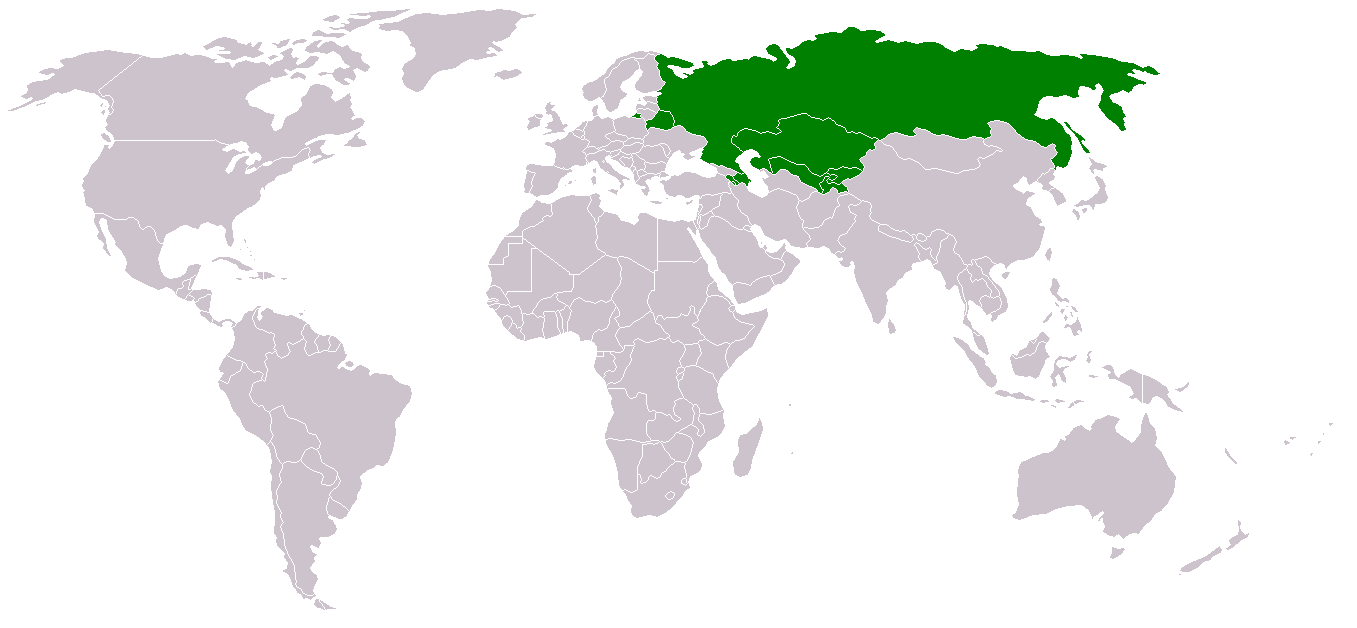
The 1994 CIS FTA Agreement signatories (all 12 countries). As of 2023, multilateral free trade regime under the 1999 Protocol has entered into force for Armenia, Azerbaijan, Belarus, Georgia, Kazakhstan, Kyrgyzstan, Moldova, Tajikistan, Uzbekistan and Ukraine while Russia and Turkmenistan refused to participate.

The 2011 Commonwealth of Independent States Free Trade Area among Russia, Ukraine, Belarus, Uzbekistan, Moldova, Armenia, Kyrgyzstan, Kazakhstan and Tajikistan

Although the countries of the Eurasian Economic Union have delegated their powers to conclude free trade in goods agreements to the supranational level according to the Treaty on the Eurasian Economic Union (Article 35), the previous agreements with third countries concluded before 1 January 2015 continue to be in force (Article 102). According to the Article 102: "Member States have the right to unilaterally grant preferences in trade with a third party on the basis of an international agreement concluded by 1 January 2015 of this Member State with such a third party or an international agreement to which all Member States are parties." Thus, agreements such as those within the Commonwealth of Independent States (the terms of the CIS FTA allow member states to enter into the FTA agreements with other countries, as well as to join/create custom unions) and bilateral agreements that do not regulate relations with third countries remain in force for their parties.

The 1994 CIS FTA Agreement, 1999 CIS FTA Protocol (multilateral free trade is in force among 10 countries) and 2011 CIS FTA Treaty (multilateral free trade is in force among 9 countries) have signed by all members of the EAEU.

=== Common System of Tariff Preferences ===
The Generalized System of Preferences (GSP), instituted in 1971 under the aegis of UN Trade and Development, has contributed over the years to creating an enabling trading environment for developing countries. EAEU members are among the few countries in the world that provide preferential treatment, according to the UNCTAD website.

The EAEU has the Common System of Tariff Preferences for approved goods from 29 developing and 48 least-developed countries. As of 5 March 2021, they are Algeria, Bolivia, Vanuatu, Venezuela, Ghana, Honduras, Egypt, Zimbabwe, Iran, Cabo Verde, Cameroon, Kenya, Republic of the Congo, Democratic People’s Republic of Korea, Côte d'Ivoire, Cuba, Morocco, the Marshall Islands, Federal States of Micronesia, Mongolia, Nigeria, Nicaragua, Pakistan, Papua New Guinea, Tunisia, the Philippines, Sri Lanka, El Salvador, Eswatini on the 1 list and Angola, Islamic Republic of Afghanistan, Bangladesh, Benin, Burkina Faso, Burundi, Bhutan, Haiti, Gambia, Guinea, Guinea-Bissau, Djibouti, Zambia, Yemen, Cambodia, Kiribati, Union of the Comoros, Democratic Republic of the Congo, Lao People’s Democratic Republic, Lesotho, Liberia, Mauritania, Madagascar, Malawi, Mali, Mozambique, Myanmar, Nepal, Republic of the Niger, Palestine(according to the United Nations General Assembly Resolution 43/177), Rwanda, Democratic Republic of Sao Tome and Principe, Senegal, Syrian Arab Republic, Solomon Islands, Federal Republic of Somalia, Sudan, Sierra Leone, Tanzania, Timor-Leste, Togolese Republic, Tuvalu, Uganda, Central African Republic, Chad, Eritrea, Ethiopia, South Sudan on the 2nd list.

The system of tariff preferences is aimed at promoting the economic growth of countries that objectively need economic assistance from the Union. In 2021, a decision was published to exclude 75 developing countries and 2 least developed countries from the lists, but at the same time, the status of the beneficiary country of the common system of tariff preferences of the EAEU is preserved for states in need of economic assistance from the EAEU. The first list of countries was approved in 2009 and did not change dramatically until 2021. As of May 2020, there were 153 countries in it, including Turkey, Brazil, Argentina, China and South Korea. The list was revised in 2021 so that there would be no injustice when lower-income countries provide tariff preferences to high-income countries. A country can obtain for tariff preferences if its income level is determined by the World Bank as "low-income" or "lower-middle-income", that is, the gross national income per capita in such a country is less than $4,045. The import duties applicable to products eligible for tariff preferences and originating from developing countries were at the level of 75% of the Most favoured nation duty rates and from least-developed countries at the level of 0%.

=== Retaliatory Measures With Regard to Third Party ===
Russia Countries on the Russia's "Unfriendly countries list"

Other exceptions are provided for in Article 40 of the Treaty on the Eurasian Economic Union.

1. In case, if the possibility of application of retaliatory measures provided by international treaty of the EAEU with third party and (or) member States with third parties, the decision on introduction of retaliatory measures on the customs territory of the EAEU, including the increase of import customs duty rates, introduction of quantitative restrictions, temporary suspension of preferences or adoption of other measures within the competence of the Commission, affecting results of foreign trade with the relevant State, shall be taken by the Commission.
2. In cases provided in the international treaties of the member States with third parties that entered into force before 1 January 2015, the member States may unilaterally apply higher import customs duty rates in comparison with the Common External Tariff of the Eurasian Economic Union, as retaliatory measures, and unilaterally suspend granting of tariff preferences provided that administration mechanisms of such measures do not violate provisions of this Treaty.

For example, on 7 March 2022, the Government of Russia in the first time approved a list of foreign states and territories that commit unfriendly acts against Russia, its legal entities and individuals. The Russian Federation believes that the countries that have restricted trade with Russia have directly violated the rules of the World Trade Organization. Russia distributed a statement to members of the organization, and the World Trade Organization published it on its website. In accordance with paragraph 2 of Article 40 of the Treaty on the Eurasian Economic Union, Russian Prime Minister Mikhail Mishustin has imposed increased tariffs on goods from unfriendly countries. A duty of 35% is imposed on imports of personal hygiene items, incense and weapons from unfriendly countries. The list includes shampoos and other hair products, individual deodorants and antiperspirants, products for aromatizing indoor air, detergents and cleaning products. The Association of Winegrowers and Winemakers of Russia proposes to introduce a 200% tariff on wine "from NATO countries", and the Government of Russia is considering such a proposal.
