= Onshore (hydrocarbons) =

Oil, natural gas or condensate field under the land

Onshore, when used in relation to hydrocarbons, refers to an oil, natural gas or condensate field that is under the land or to activities or operations carried out in relation to such a field.

Onshore may also refer to processes that take place on land that are associated with oil, gas or condensate production that has taken place offshore. The offshore production facility delivers oil, gas and condensate by pipelines to the onshore terminal and processing facility. Alternatively oil may be delivered by ocean-going tanker to the onshore terminal.

== Onshore oil terminals ==
Onshore oil terminals may include large crude oil tanks for the initial storage of oil prior to processing. Such tanks provide a buffer volume where oil is delivered by tanker. The oil tanker delivery rate is considerably greater than the processing capacity of the plant. Crude oil tanks also allow offshore production to continue if the export route becomes unavailable.

Onshore oil terminals generally have fired heaters to heat the oil to improve subsequent separation. Separator vessels and coalescers stabilise the crude and remove any sediments, produced water and allow light hydrocarbons to flash-off. Large separation vessels give the oil an appropriate residence time in the vessel to allow effective separation to occur. Onshore separators operate at near atmospheric pressure to release as much vapor as possible. The oil processing plant aims to achieve an appropriate vapor pressure specification for the oil. The associated gas is processed for export or used in the plant as fuel gas. Stabilised oil is routed to storage tanks prior to dispatch for international sales delivery by tanker, or to a local oil refinery for processing.

== Onshore gas terminals ==
See main article Natural-gas Processing

Onshore gas terminals may have facilities for removal of liquids from the incoming gas stream. Liquids may include natural gas liquids (NGL), produced water, and glycol (MEG or TEG). Separation of liquid from gas is done in slug catchers, which either comprise an array of pipes or a large cylindrical vessel. A variety of treatment processes are used to condition the gas to a required specification. Such processes may include glycol dehydration, gas sweetening, hydrocarbon dew-point control, fractionation, natural gas liquids (NGL) recovery, gas compression before gas distribution to users.

The hydrocarbon dewpoint changes with the prevailing ambient temperature, the seasonal variation is:

Seasonal variation of hydrocarbon dewpoint
Hydrocarbon dewpoint	30°F (–1.1°C)	35°F (1.7°C)	40°F (4.4°C)	45°F (7.2°C)	50°F (10°C)
Months	December January February March	April November	May October	June September	July August

== See also ==
- Petroleum refining processes
- Oil refinery
- Oil terminal
