= National Addiction and HIV Data Archive Program =

The National Addiction and HIV Data Archive Program (NAHDAP) is a repository of drug abuse and HIV/AIDS research data primarily including social science and behavioral data. NAHDAP’s mission is to bring the power of science to bear on drug abuse and addiction by supporting research across a wide range of disciplines and ensuring the rapid and effective dissemination and use of the results of that research to improve prevention, treatment and policy.

== Description ==
NAHDAP is a program within the Inter-university Consortium for Political and Social Research (ICPSR), a unit in the Institute for Social Research (ISR) at the University of Michigan. NAHDAP's staff consists of professional researchers, data archivists and technicians working together to obtain, process, distribute, and promote amongst social science researchers sharing of data relevant to drug addiction and HIV.

NAHDAP is a project of the National Institute on Drug Abuse, part of the National Institutes of Health. The NAHDAP Web site launched in June 2010 and offers a library of electronic data and citations to publications based on those data. NAHDAP provides technical assistance and resources to investigators to facilitate preparing their data for archiving so that they can be easily and effectively archived at project completion. NAHDAP also provides technical assistance to users of the data sets, including workshops and webinars, to train analysts in the unique characteristics of selected datasets, in quantitative methods, and in the utility of analyzing secondary data for the reproduction of original research findings and addressing new research questions on major issues of social and behavioral sciences and public policy.
