= First International Statistical Congress =

Physics conference in Brussels, Belgium (1853)

The first International Statistical Congress opened on September 19, 1853 in Brussels, Belgium, with twenty-six countries in attendance. It was principally organised by Belgian astronomer and statistician Adolphe Quetelet, who envisioned a standardisation of European units of measurement to allow for collaborative research to be done between nations. Therefore, it was designed to create tentative guidelines for the process of unifying measurement in statistical research, and it was also aimed to establish leadership and regulations for future congresses. Although the first one was followed by seven further sessions across Europe between 1853 and 1876, it was unsuccessful in its initial goals to standardise all measurements across nations, as it occurred at a time when international conferences failed to overcome national interests.

== Congress development ==
In 1851, Queen Victoria’s husband, Prince Albert, organised the first World’s Fair held at the Great Exhibition of London. As it attracted scholars from different parts of Europe, Prince Albert began the task of influencing public opinion favourably towards the standardisation of international statistics. One of these scholars was the Belgian astronomer and statistician Adolphe Quetelet, who became convinced of the necessity for an international congress to unify the various methods of statistical measurement across different nations. Upon his return to Brussels, Quetelet wrote to Prince Albert expressing his desire to collaborate in the creation of an international statistical congress. Aided by members of the Belgian Statistical Commission, Quetelet and Prince Albert agreed to work together to create the First International Statistical Congress in Brussels.

The purpose of the International Statistical Congress went beyond simply standardising units of measurement throughout Europe. The founders believed that a common means of measuring, to use the same units to represent the same results, was necessary. It would allow for easier transfer of data between nations so that officials could interpret other states’ findings without previously converting them. In doing so, this would not only create a sense of unity amongst European nations, but it would also greatly increase the efficacy of statistical-based research, allowing for bigger scientific initiatives to be taken in the hopes of improving living conditions across Europe.

== Attendance and roles ==
=== States in attendance ===
A total of twenty-six states and their leading statisticians participated in the Congress. Officially, the states represented were:

- Austria
- Baden
- Bavaria
- Belgium
- Denmark
- Ottoman Egypt
- France
- Frankfurt-am-Main
- Great Britain
- Hamburg
- Hanover
- Hesse-Kassel
- Grand Duchy of Hesse
- Lübeck
- The Netherlands
- Norway
- Portugal
- Prussia
- Sardinia
- Saxony
- Spain
- Switzerland
- Grand Duchy of Tuscany
- The Two Sicilies
- The United States of America
- Württemberg

=== Administrative roles ===
The first order of business for the Congress was to establish administrative roles. Ferdinand Piercot, Belgium's Minister of the Interior, was elected as President of the Congress; William Farr of England, Louis-René Villermé of France, Karl Friedrich Wilhelm Dieterici of then-Prussia, Carl Mittermaier of then-Baden, Jan Akersdyck of the Netherlands, Ramón de la Sagra of Spain, Karl von Czoernig of Austria, and Bertini of Sardinia were named Vice-Presidents. A system of publications and operations, along with an official and regular correspondence scheme between members and nations, was devised for implementation in the Congress. The Congress proceeded to appoint one person by nation responsible for receiving and reporting new national scientific developments, and lastly, created the Bulletin of the Central Statistical Commission to publish an annual newsletter of statistical communications and documents relevant to the committee.

=== National interests ===
Despite the Congress's emphasis on international collaboration, a great portion of the conference was first spent highlighting domestic statistics and measurement processes to gain a better understanding of how best to begin standardisation. Delegates in attendance spoke of the methods in which their nations compiled statistical information. However, this was not without ulterior motives. Often, participating nations exerted their own interests to influence the agenda to varying degrees. For example, the Belgian commission expressed the need to focus on economic statistics for workers. Vienna introduced ethnographic statistics concerning demographics and populations at the encouragement of Karl von Czoernig, the director of the Habsburg’s statistical service, who believed in the viability of international demographic analysis. Furthermore, national interests directly conflicted with the gathering of statistical information. In France, statisticians were prompted to present misleading demographic statistics that would underestimate the population growth of the country as not to raise concerns among their European neighbours regarding the balance of power.

== Congress accomplishments ==
=== Organisations for standard measurement ===
The Congress first decided that if a united system of information was needed in international statistics, they would have to establish a standard template for officials across nations to follow when informing the public of various statistics. As a result, the members of the Congress concluded that it was necessary to create a certain manner of tables and statements to be implemented across Europe. Likewise, they recommended that each national government establish a Central Statistical Commission, which would be uniform throughout the continent, and ensure that the standardisation of statistics by these officials would be done according to the new measures. In addition to these Central Commissions, the Congress advised that local Commissions also be established for the purpose of overcoming any local irregularities concerning the measurement process of statistics previously overlooked.

=== Industry and agriculture ===
Collaboratively, the First International Statistical Congress took into account the nature of industries throughout European nations, including agriculture, mining, manufacturing, and commercial enterprises which consisted of import and export statistics. For agriculture specifically, censuses were designed to measure what and how much was produced, what farm equipment was used, and how many workers and animals were present; these took place once every ten years in the winter, after the annual harvests to ensure availability of farmers. Industrial censuses measured what kind of mechanical forces were prevalent in specific industries, such as hydraulics or steam power, as well as demographics like the number of workers, their salaries, and the quantity of goods produced. For example, mines would need to report the size and depth of the mine, as well as the methods of extraction, the good extracted, and how much was produced. The Congress agreed that in order to record the most precise information possible using these agricultural censuses, it was necessary to conduct surveys simultaneously and collect the results through local Commissions, at which point a final table could be created and used for comparison against other states.

=== Urbanisation and education ===
The Congress sought to standardise certain measurements for cities and their inhabitants. In terms of demographics and population, metrics like emigration and immigration were analysed based on origin, health condition, and number of people departing from and arriving at certain nations. As well, the cause of the immigration was considered, such as political or religious reasonings. Originally, the Congress advocated that any censuses regarding immigration and emigration consist of personal details including the motive for emigration, as well as the capital which the migrant would carry with them. However, this led to conflicting discussion on the merits of asking questions that seemed to be too inquisitive, and thus the final proposed censuses avoided questions seen as overtly personal. The working class was also examined from an economic angle, through their savings and expenses from food, rent, and clothing. Here, data was gathered from one family or household every ten years in the month of December. Additionally, personal information such as Indigenous status, language spoken, religion, place of birth, education level and profession, number of rooms in one’s house, and illnesses were also included in the census.

Regarding cities themselves, studies were conducted in an attempt to compare countries’ standards of public health, criminal behaviour, and property partitioning. For property, the Congress examined different states’ measurements of who inherited property and how much was inherited after death.

=== Geography and navigation ===
To standardise physical terrain across nations to create uniformity, the Congress proposed a system of triangulation to measure distance for each country’s map if states were able to provide an adequate, acceptable one. If not, the accepted solution was to begin with the largest possible approximation of triangulation, and gain closer results by subdividing each triangle until the resulting map was satisfactory. This process was done immediately after following surveys of land, and was subsequently followed up by closer examinations of each nation’s soil and flora.

Navigation was also a component that the Congress looked at; the participating countries agreed to keep a measure of the number of boats entering and exiting each sea, as well as the number of people and cargo aboard. It was required to do so in a manner that differentiated between classical sailboats and newer steam-powered boats.

=== Spread of information ===
Traditionally, methods to transmit information at the time of the Congress included introductory letters, scientific correspondence, and face-to-face visits. However, the Congress coincided with growth of more modern methods of communication, such as telegrams. This allowed for a shift in the means of transmitting knowledge and further collaboration between nations. It was the hope that nations would use telegrams to produce quicker and more efficient communications between each other, but national interests prevailed over international cooperation, which adversely impacted the effect that telegrams had on statistical standardisation overall.

== Aftermath ==
Despite many of the major areas talked about during the First International Statistical Congress, no major progress was achieved in standardising measurement across Europe. This was partly attributed to an overall lack of cohesive communication, an inability for the Congress to gather and verify data, and a growing tension in nationalist beliefs in states. In particular, France and Germany were culprits of misrepresentation of population demographics. Moreover, nationalism played a large role in the failure of standardising statistical information across Europe; domestic governments' desire to push individual agendas overcame the desire to develop international uniformity.

The first Congress would give way to seven more International Statistical Congresses, which took place across Europe from 1855 to 1876.

These include:

- The Second International Statistical Congress (1855), Paris
- The Third International Statistical Congress (1857), Vienna
- The Fourth International Statistical Congress (1860), London
- The Fifth International Statistical Congress (1863), Berlin
- The Sixth International Statistical Congress (1867), Florence
- The Seventh International Statistical Congress (1869), The Hague
- The Eighth International Statistical Congress (1872), St. Petersburg

In addition, after the eighth Congress, the Permanent Commission of the International Statistical Congress was created in 1872 to guide and facilitate cooperation on developing international statistics. They would assemble four times in the following eight years. The backlash to all of these iterations of the International Statistical Congress, however, mainly centred on how all states involved were ultimately unable to accomplish anything of note. In each Congress, the agenda would often be populated with topics that were desirable to certain nations and undesirable to others. As a result, collaboration could not be achieved and the Congresses failed to progress further.

== See also ==
- International Sanitary Conferences
- Brussels, Belgium
- Statistics
- International Statistical Institute
- International Statistical Classification of Diseases and Related Health Problems (ICD)

== Bibliography ==
- Hayes, M. Compte rendu des travaux du Congrès général de statistique. 1855. https://babel.hathitrust.org/cgi/pt?id=mdp.39015058579163&view=1up&seq=7
- Brown, Samuel. "Report of the Proceedings at the Statistical Congress, held at Brussels, 19th to 22nd September, 1853 (Concluded)." The Assurance Magazine, and Journal of the Institute of Actuaries 5, no. 1. 1855. Accessed February 29, 2020. https://www.jstor.org/stable/41134642
- Levi, Leone. "Resume of the Statistical Congress, Held at Brussels, September 11th, 1853, for the Purpose of Introducing Unity in the Statistical Documents of All Countries." Journal of the Statistical Society of London 17, no. 1. 1854. Accessed February 27, 2020. doi:10.2307/2338350.
- Quételet, Adolphe. Congrès International de Statistique: sessions de Bruxelles (1853), Paris (1855), Vienne (1857), Londres (1860), Berlin (1863), Florence (1867), La Haye (1869), et St Pétersbourg (1872). 1873.
- Randeraad, Nico. "The International Statistical Congress (1853-1876): Knowledge Transfers and their Limits." European History Quarterly 41, no. 1. 2011. Accessed February 26, 2020. https://journals.sagepub.com/doi/abs/10.1177/0265691410385759
- Willcox, Walter F. "Development of International Statistics." The Milbank Memorial Fund Quarterly 27, no. 2. 1949. Accessed February 26, 2020. doi:10.2307/3348163.
