= Measurement in economics =

The measures used in economics are physical measures, nominal price value measures and fixed price value measures. These measures differ from one another by the variables they measure and by the variables excluded from measurements. The measurable variables in economics are quantity, quality and distribution. Excluding variables from measurement makes it possible to better focus the measurement on a given variable, yet, this means a more narrow approach. The table was compiled to compare the basic types of measurement. The first column presents the measure types, the second the variables being measured, and the third column gives the variables excluded from measurement.

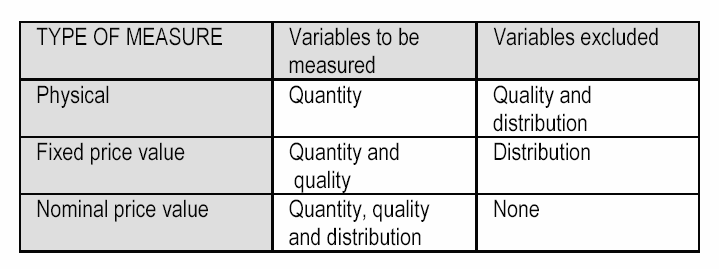
Comparison of basic measure types (Saari 2006)

== Variables ==
The measurable variables in economics are quantity, quality and distribution. Measuring quantity in economics follows the rules of measuring in physics. Quality as a variable refers to qualitative changes in the production process. Qualitative changes take place when relative of different constant-price input and output factors alter. Distribution as a variable of the production refers to a series of events in which the unit prices of constant-quality products and inputs alter causing a change in income distribution among those participating in the exchange. The magnitude of the change in income distribution is directly proportionate to the change in prices of the output and inputs and to their quantities. Productivity gains are distributed, for example, to customers as lower product prices or to staff as higher pay.

== Physical measure ==
A physical measure can measure the quantity of a variable with unchanged quality. Using a physical measure provides that the quality of the measurement object has been specified and the quality remains homogeneous. If the presumed unchanged quality is not realized, the measurement gives results which are hard to interpret. In this case, the results are affected by changes in both quantity and quality but in which proportion is unknown. Values of the objects being measured are by no means related to the physical measures, hence, changes in prices do not affect the measurement results. Normally it is not possible to combine physical measures. They are best suited for narrow-focused measurements with neither quality nor value alterations. Therefore, physical measures are best for measuring the real process, and this is why they are used a lot as tools of operative management. Typical ratios in a real process are capacity, efficiencies, lead times, loads, faults, product and process characteristics, etc.

== Fixed-price value ==
A fixed-price value measure is used to measure changes in quality and quantity. True to its name, prices are kept fixed for a minimum of two measuring situations. For this reason, it is possible to define the changes in quality and quantity of a most varied and wide range of commodities, keeping apart the changes in income distribution. Fixed-price measures are suited for wide-ranging measurement because it is possible to combine different commodities based on their value. In a fixed-price measurement, a change in quality means that the relative quantities and relative prices of various commodities change. The best known applications of this are the productivity formula and the production function. The production function is always presented with fixed-price ratios, i.e., its variables, productivity and volume, are fixed-price values.

== Nominal price value ==
The most common figures in measuring business are the figures because they can describe the profitability of business process. Variables in the nominal price measurement are quality, quantities and distribution (in form of product prices). There are no excluded variables. Nominal price measures of value are suited for measuring profitability and its components as well as the value of reserves. Return and costs in the loss and profit statement are typical examples of a nominal price. In short-term reviews with only little production income distribution taking place, nominal price values are well suited for estimates of fixed price values.

== See also ==
- Productivity
- Measurement
