= International comparisons =

Quantitative, qualitative, and evaluative analysis of countries

International comparisons focuses on the quantitative, qualitative, and evaluative analysis of one country in relation to others. Often, the objective is to compare one country's performance to others in order to assess what countries have achieved, what needs to change in order for them to perform better, or a country's progress in reaching certain objectives.

== Evaluative analysis ==
The data can be as simple as comparing countries' population or gross domestic product (GDP), but these do not evaluate performance. For example, if we'd like to compare the United States' economic productivity to Norway's, we could start by comparing GDP, using figures as of this writing. Norway's GDP is nearly 500 billion U.S. dollars, while the United States' GDP is 15,680 billion dollars. To evaluate fairly, we need to consider population. Norway's GDP per capita is actually larger than the U.S.: $99,558 per person compared to $51,749. Such a metric is a more telling indication for international comparisons which simpler statistics fail to reveal.

== Quality of life/subjective well-being comparisons ==
Some important evaluations cannot really be quantified, but are based on qualitative measurements, such as "Which country is happiest?" Evaluative analysis, while controversial, can determine subjective well-being to some extent. The United Nations' World Happiness Report and the Organisation for Economic Co-operation and Development's Better Life Index have both followed in the footsteps of the United Nations Development Programme's Human Development Report in their attempts to quantify "happiness." The inevitably large role of money (quantified traditionally as GDP per capita) is generally acknowledged, yet does not explain why "poorer" countries report greater happiness on occasion. Further analysis can indicate other factors boosting the quality of life of a lower income country. The science of happiness evaluation is improving, but also may use very different combinations and weights of evaluative statistics. These differences result from different indicators being used and different weighting among the indicators, based on the values and interests of an organization.

== Examples of international comparisons online ==
The following alphabetical list of online examples demonstrate how international comparisons work and should work, using many applications of evaluative analysis.

=== Organisation for Economic Co-operation and Development (OECD) ===
The OECD publishes original research as often as on a weekly basis with the objective of affecting change as it strives to achieve its slogan: "Better policies for better lives." The Better Life Index is the organization's measure for subjective well-being. Because of its size, the OECD statistical database can be complex to navigate until one finds the part one is looking for.

=== Social Progress Imperative ===
The Social Progress Imperative released its second version of the Social Progress Index. It is based on four "key design principles": exclusively uses social and environmental indicators (no economic indicators), outcomes not inputs (i.e. health status not health expenditure), actionability (translatable pragmatism), and relevance to all countries (neither exclusively focused on the poorest countries nor the advanced democracies). The Social Progress Index contains 54 indicators categorized within the following three categories: basic human needs, foundations of well-being, and opportunity.

=== United Nations Development Programme (UNDP) ===
The United Nations Development Programme is predominantly focused on low income countries and their advancement, as evidenced in the objectives of the Millennium Development Goals, which strive to eradicate extreme poverty, HIV/AIDS, and promote education via sustainable development globally. The UNDP's Human Development Report is the original, authoritative source on subjective well-being and its evaluative analysis since it first challenged GDP/capita as the indicator for quality of life with its first Human Development Index in 1990. The annual Human Development Index is a relevant challenge for over 140 countries regardless of their development stage.

=== World Bank ===
The World Bank aspires to impact development by promoting open data and subsequently transparency, accountability, and democracy as the private sector is emphasized for its role. Its compiled database, the World Development Indicators, contains 18 topics containing hundreds of statistics.

=== The World Factbook ===
Seven different categories with 79 different fields of statistics make up The World Factbook produced by the United States' Central Intelligence Agency.

=== World Health Organization ===
With an emphasis on how international comparisons and evaluative analysis can impact world health, the World Health Organization offers the Global Health Observatory, a data site on various diseases, mortality rates, and other variables such as gender, class, and technology. Its contains over 50 datasets for as many as 194 countries.
