= Factor cost =

Factor cost or national income by type of income is a measure of national income or output based on the cost of factors of production, instead of market prices. This allows the effect of any subsidy or indirect tax to be removed from the final measure.

The concept of factor cost is focusing on the cost incurred on the factor of production. It can be defined as the actual cost incurred on goods and services produced by industries and firms is known as factor costs. Factor costs include all the costs of the factors of production to produce a given product in an economy. It includes the costs of land, labor, capital and raw material, transportation etc. They are used to produce a given quantity of output in an economy. The factor cost does not include the profits made by the producing firms or industries or the tax which they incur on producing those goods and services. We can simply categorize it as the cost of producing a product from unfinished good to a semi finished good or a finished good up to the desired output level.

== The role of factor costs ==
In a microeconomic analytical framework, profit maximization by the firm makes the desired level of capital depend on the cost of labour and capital factors. Firms have a choice among several possible productive combinations, and choose the one that minimizes its costs, and thus maximizes its profits. In the short term, when the level of production is constrained by market outlets, it is the relative cost of the factors of production that is taken into account. Thus, if the cost of capital rises in relation to wage costs, it is in the firm's interest to limit investment expenditure by substituting a greater quantity of labour for capital. In the long term, where the production programme is not constrained by market outlets, it is the real cost of each factor that is taken into account in the investment decision. Empirical studies at the macroeconomic level have long failed to show the impact of factor costs on investment (Dormond 1977). This relationship between the cost of production factors and the level of investment appears to be theoretically sound.

The concept of "user cost of capital" has been integrated by Crépon and Gianella. They carried out a study by integrating many elements: bank interest rates specific to each company, balance sheet structure, taxation of companies and shareholders, inflation and depreciation. This indicator provides a rigorous assessment of the effective cost of capital. Over the period considered in this study (1984-1997), the cost of capital fell significantly, mainly as a result of the easing of real interest rates. Taxation contributed only marginally to the decline in the user cost of capital. Its variations have been erratic: corporate taxes declined from the mid-1980s to 1995, but the tax burden increased thereafter.

From this study they were able to distinguish two effects of a variation in the user cost of capital: a substitution effect and a profitability effect. An increase in the cost of capital should encourage firms to substitute labour for capital, thus increasing the demand for labour (substitution effect). At the same time, however, a rise in the cost of capital increases the unit cost of production for the firm, thereby raising its prices, and may reduce the demand for capital (profitability effect). The proposed estimates suggest that the profitability effect dominates the substitution effect. An increase in the cost of capital would therefore lead to a fall in demand for both factors of production, capital and labour, and thus penalise employment.

When calculating national income indirect taxes are deducted while subsidies are added
