= Administrative data =

Administrative data are collected by governments or other organizations for non-statistical reasons to provide overviews on registration, transactions, and record keeping. They evaluate part of the output of administrating a program. Border records, pensions, taxation, and vital records like births and deaths are examples of administrative data. These types of data are used to produce management information, like registration data in a cost-effective way. This enables administrative data, when turned into indicators, to show trends over time and reflect real world information. The management of this information includes the Internet, software, technology, telecommunications, databases and management systems, system development methods, information systems, etc. Managing the resources of the public sector is a complex routine. It begins with the collection of data, then goes through the hardware and software that stores, manipulates, and transforms the data. Public policies then are addressed, including organizational policies and procedures.

== History ==
Records of land holding have been used to administer taxes around the world for many centuries. In the nineteenth century international institutions for cooperation was established, such as the International Statistical Institute.

In recent decades administrative data on individuals and organization are increasingly computerized and systematic and therefore more feasibly usable for statistics, although they do not come from random samples. Using the reporting tools of routine reports, audit trails, and computer programming to cross examine databases, administrative data are increasingly used for research.

The appeal of administrative data is its ready availability, low cost, and the fact that it can span over multiple years. The government produces this kind of data because it provides a historical insight and is not invasive to the population. These data record individuals who may not respond to surveys which allows the administrative system to retain more complete records. The information that the census can provide the administrative system is limited financially and is subject to time constraints which is why administrative data can be valuable, especially when linked.

== Open and linked administrative data ==
Open administrative data allows transparency, participation, efficiency, and economic innovation. Linked administrative data allows for the creation of large data-sets and has become a vital tool for central and local governments conducting research. By linking sections of data individually, the online web of administrative data-sets are built. For example, opening public sector data in Europe increased users 1000%. This 2011 study covered 21 open data projects in 10 countries with marginal cost operations. The Open Data Ottawa program was launched in 2010 in order to engage citizens, create transparency, reduce costs, and promote collaboration with the public.

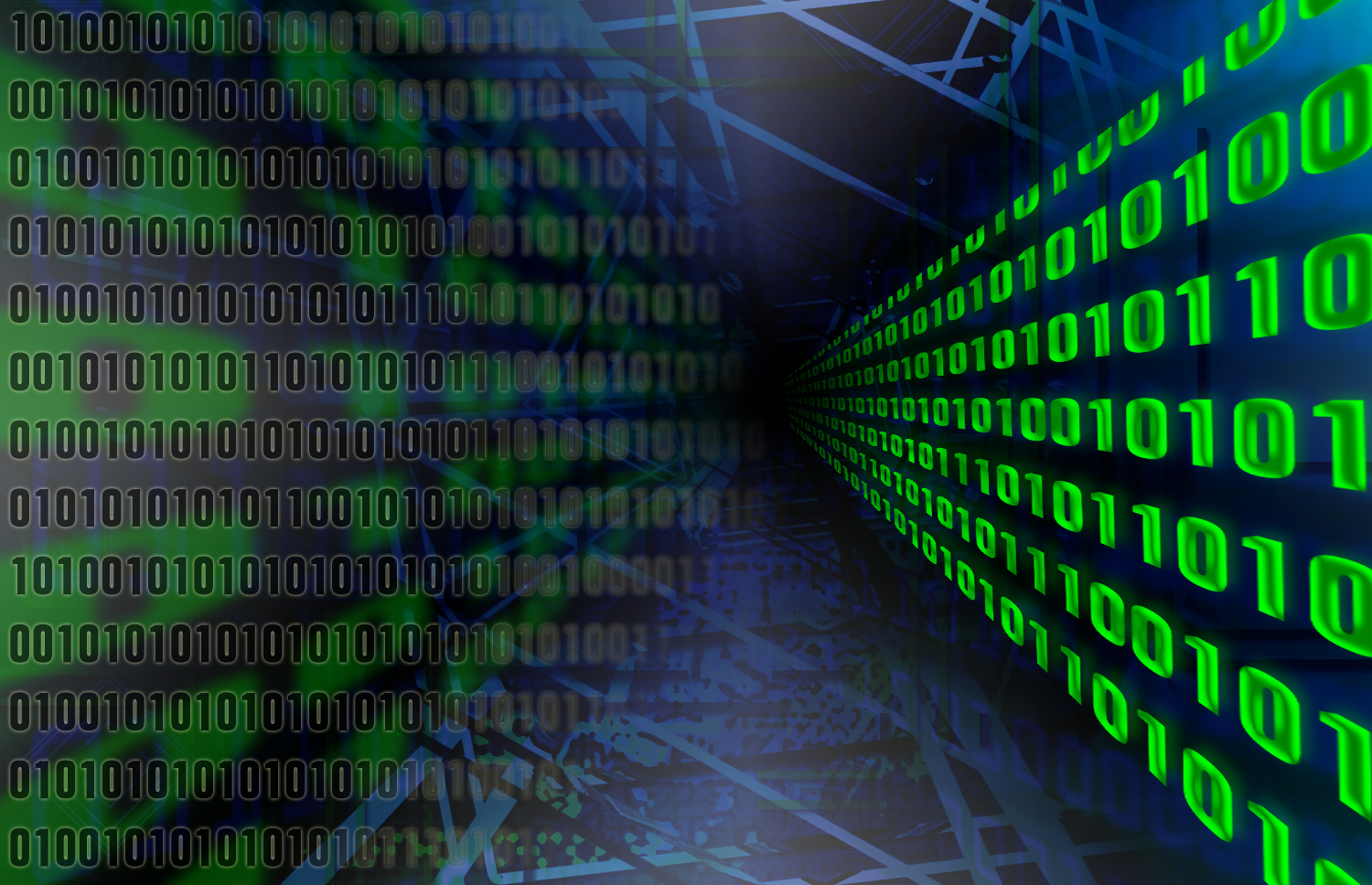
Big Data

Administrative data is sought after by open data enthusiasts partly because the data has been already collected and can be reused with minimal additional cost. These data are brought up to date regularly and relay real time data as they are collected consistently.

The Justice Data Lab (JDL) established in the UK by the Ministry of Justice proposed how access to administrative data needs to be improved by linking administrative data to data produced by public services. The JDL case study explores how smaller organization attain access to administrative data. The study revealed that through working together with actors (VCS organizations, social enterprises, and private businesses), Government departments' engagement with users increased the volume of output. Due to this other Data Labs are anticipated to develop new data-sets and methodologies to showcase how open and linked administrative data can help a wide range of organizations. However, the cost of production and institutional technology required to conduct and store this data are not free. Concerns over open and linked data beyond government funding and the opposing outcomes have yet to be fully examined. Examination is mostly focused on creating projects for political and economic gain and less on implementation, sustainability, user ability, and ingrained politics.

== Concerns ==
Some disadvantages of administrative data are that the information collected is not always open and is restricted to certain users. There is also a lack of control over content, for example Statistics Canada uses administrative data to enrich, replace survey data, or to increase the efficiency of statistical operations. These types of data do not have background information and sometimes have missing data. Changes in methodology can result in altercations to the data collected, for example when using these data to assess health care quality introductions of new diagnosis and advances in technology can affect the identification and recording of diagnoses on administrative claims. Issues with data protection is concern as more administrative data is becoming open data. Statistics Canada seeks to reduce privacy invasiveness of personal identifiers by having them removed for the linked file. The personal information, such as name, health number, or Social Insurance Number is then stored separately. However, access to linked files with personal identifiers is allowed in cases with authorization and have security, such as encryption, applied.
