= Karl Friedrich Wilhelm Dieterici =

German political economist

Karl Friedrich Wilhelm Dieterici (23 August 1790 – 30 July 1859) was a German political economist.

== Biography ==
Dieterici was born and died in Berlin. He was an engineer-geographer in Blücher's army from 1813 to 1815, was engaged in the Ministry of Public Instruction, became professor of political science in the University of Berlin, and in 1844 was placed at the head of the statistical bureau. He published a number of important works on political economy and statistics, among which may be mentioned: De Via et Ratione Œconomiam Politicam Docendi and Statistische Uebersicht der wichtigsten Gegenstände des Verkehrs und Verbrauchs im preussischen Staat und im deutschen Zollverband (1838).
