= Marie-Laure =

Marie-Laure is a feminine compound given name which is borne by:

- Marie-Laure Augry (born 1947), French journalist
- Marie-Laure Brunet (born 1988), French biathlete
- Marie-Laure de Decker (1947–2023), French photographer
- Marie-Laure Delie (born 1988), French footballer
- Marie-Laure Dougnac (born 1962), French actress
- Marie-Laure Gaillot (born 1943), French swimmer
- Marie-Laure Giraudon (born 1972), French swimmer
- Marie-Laure de Lorenzi (born 1961), French golfer
- Marie-Laure de Noailles (1902–1970), French artist, patron of the arts and art collector
- Marie-Laure Phinéra-Horth (born 1957), French Guinean politician
- Marie-Laure Salles (born 1965), French sociologist
- Marie-Laure Valla (1963–2022), French set dresser and set decorator

== See also ==
- Marie Laure Tardieu (1902–1998), French botanist
