= Relations internationales =

- Cover of the first issue
- Discipline: International relations, History
- Language: French

Publication details
- History: 1974–present
- Publisher: Presses universitaires de France (France)
- Frequency: Quarterly

Standard abbreviations
- ISO 4: Relat. Int.

Indexing
- ISSN: 0335-2013 (print); 2105-2654 (web)

Links
- Online access

Relations internationales is a francophone quarterly scientific journal, founded in 1974 by Jean-Baptiste Duroselle and Jacques Freymond. It publishes academic articles on the contemporary history of international relations in the 19th and 20th centuries. It is among only a handful of French-language journals specializing in the history of international relations, and was founded in reaction to the intellectual domination of the English language in the study of international relations. The journal is managed by the Institut d’histoire des relations internationales contemporaines at the Paris 1 Panthéon-Sorbonne University and by the Geneva Graduate Institute. It is published by the Presses universitaires de France.

G7 Évian : déclaration conjointe Ukraine/Iran.
