= Geneva Centre for Education and Research in Humanitarian Action =

Institution in Geneva, Switzerland

Geneva Centre of Humanitarian Studies
- French: Centre d'études humanitaires de Genève
- Established: 1998
- Affiliations: University of Geneva
- Director: Prof. Karl Blanchet
- Location: Geneva, Geneva, Switzerland
- Website: www.humanitarianstudies.ch

The Geneva Centre of Humanitarian Studies (French: Centre d'études humanitaires de Genève) (formerly known as CERAH) offers comprehensive and specialized postgraduate training programs for professionals active in the humanitarian sector. Initially a joint center of the University of Geneva and the Graduate Institute of International and Development Studies until September 2024, it has since become affiliated with the Department de santé et médecine communautaires of the Faculty of Medicine at the University of Geneva.

== History ==
Between the 1970s and 1980s, some of the larger humanitarian organizations based in Geneva started offering operational training for humanitarians. A decade later, the need to 'professionalize' the sector became evident in the aftermath of the Rwanda genocide, the Balkans war, and the ensuing mass mobilization of new humanitarian actors.

1998 – Back then, there were no academic courses on humanitarian action, but thanks to the University of Geneva, several international organizations and the Swiss Ministry of Foreign Affairs, a Plurifaculty Program for Humanitarian Action – PPAH, was born. The Plurifaculty Program for Humanitarian Action was the first iteration of the Geneva Centre of Humanitarian Studies. The objective of this visionary program was to offer high-level, continuous education for humanitarian practitioners.

2004 – The program was radically transformed under the impulse of the University of Geneva and the Graduate Institute of International and Development Studies (IHEID) and re-named PIAH – Interdisciplinary Program in Humanitarian Action. PIAH offered a wider course program, including a Master of Advanced Studies in Humanitarian Action, in partnership with the International Committee of the Red Cross and Médecins Sans Frontières Switzerland.

2008 – The partnership between the University of Geneva and the IHEID changed the program’s name into CERAH – Centre for Education and Research in Humanitarian Action. In 2012, the Centre expanded its course offer by adding to the Master DAS, CAS and Executive Short Courses. In 2017, the Centre launched its Humanitarian Encyclopedia research project, and in 2018 it celebrated its 20th anniversary.

2020 – The Centre evolved further and became the Geneva Centre of Humanitarian Studies.

== Degree and Training Programa ==
=== Master of Advanced Studies in Humanitarian Action (MAS) ===
The MAS in Humanitarian Action is a 10- to 12-month full-time program of 60 European Credit Transfer System (ECTS) credits. The program is focused on building in-depth understanding of the central conceptual and operational aspects of humanitarian action. Since 2012, the MAS in Humanitarian Action is offered to international managers in the humanitarian and development sector (with at least 2 years of working experience and holding a higher education institution degree), who wish to deepen their competencies in specific areas and add an academic and analytical dimension to their professional skills. This program was awarded unconditional accreditation by the Swiss Center of Accreditation and Quality Assurance in Higher Education (AAQ).

=== Other Courses ===
The Centre offers a wide range of Executive Short Courses on specific topics linked to humanitarian action, including negotiation, advocacy, planetary health, protection and more. The majority of the short courses are delivered online. In addition, the Centre offers a few residential courses either in Geneva or other locations.

The Diploma of Advanced Studies (DAS) aims to offer professionals a critical understanding of the humanitarian system and response learning from history and various other disciplines and an ability to contextualize humanitarian action in today’s world. It explores the role of humanitarianism in how the world is governed today and the political economy at play in relationships between States, non-State actors, international organizations, international and local non-governmental organizations and affected populations. Finally, the program addresses the postcolonial dynamics of past and present humanitarian interventions to identify new avenues for contemporary and future crises.

The Certificate of Advanced Studies in Quality Management of Humanitarian Projects addresses the dynamics and components that guarantee the quality management of adapted projects and cohesive teams. It integrates fundamental principles such as inclusion and diversity, do no harm, accountability and participation into processes, methods and tools of project and people management. The course benefits from guest lecturers from various partner organizations, including MSF, SPHERE, HQAI, CHS Alliance and Terre des Hommes.
