= Alessandro Monsutti =

Alessandro Monsutti is a leading Italian expert on the Hazaras, a Persian-speaking people who mainly live in central Afghanistan.

Monsutti is currently professor of anthropology and sociology at the Graduate Institute of International and Development Studies, in Geneva, Switzerland. He was previously a research fellow at the School of Oriental and African Studies and Yale University. He has been a grantee the MacArthur Foundation.

In 2012, he gave the annual Elizabeth Colson Lecture at Oxford University.

He is often cited in the media for his expertise.
