= Martina Viarengo =

Italian economist

Martina Viarengo is a Professor of international economics at the Graduate Institute of International and Development Studies of Geneva, Switzerland and a Principal Investigator of the Swiss National Center for Competence in Research. She is a specialist in public policy, labor economics and economic development. Her research focuses on labor markets, comparative education policy and international migration.

== Career ==
Dr. Viarengo is a Professor of international economics at the Graduate Institute of International and Development Studies in Geneva, Switzerland, and a Principal Investigator of the Swiss National Center for Competence in Research.

After obtaining a bachelor's degree in economics from the Faculty of Economics at University of Turin, she completed a Master's degree at Northwestern University and a PhD at the London School of Economics and Political Science. After completing her doctoral studies, she was a Postdoctoral Fellow at the Harvard University, John F. Kennedy School of Government and then worked as an economist at the Centre for Economic Performance of the London School of Economics.

Professor Viarengo was named a Newton International Fellow by the British Academy, the Royal Society and the Royal Academy of Engineering. Dr. Viarengo was elected fellow of the Royal Society of Arts and she was named a Young Global Leader by the World Economic Forum. She was awarded the prestigious Eisenhower Fellowship.

== Research ==
Professor Viarengo has written numerous peer-reviewed articles published in leading academic journals. An example of some of her international peer-reviewed publications include the following:

- "Crime, Inequality and Subsidized Housing: Evidence from South Africa," World Development (2023),
- "The Gender Aspect of Immigrant Assimilation in Europe," Labor Economics (2022),
- "Gender Differences in Professional Career Dynamics: New Evidence from a Global Law Firm," Economica (2021),
- "Nation-building through Compulsory Schooling during the Age of Mass Migration," Economic Journal (2019),
- "Changing How Literacy is Taught: Evidence on Synthetic Phonics," American Economic Journal: Economic Policy (2018),
- "Does Additional Spending Help Urban Schools? An Evaluation Using Boundary Discontinuities," Journal of the European Economic Association (2018),
- "Closing the Gender Gap in Education: What is the State of Gaps in Labor Force Participation for Women, Wives and Mothers," International Labor Review (2014),
- "School and Family Effects on Educational Outcomes across Countries," Economic Policy (2014),
- "The making of modern America: migratory flows in the age of mass migration," Journal of Development Economics (2013),
- "Does money matter for schools?" Economics of Education Review (2010),
- "The expansion and convergence of compulsory schooling in Western Europe, 1950–2000," Economica (2011).
