= Liliana Andonova =

Liliana Botcheva-Andonova (born 8 November 1969) is a Bulgarian professor of international relations and political science specializing in climate governance at the Geneva Graduate Institute. Previously, she was an assistant professor in government and environmental studies at Colby College, in the United States.

== Background ==
Andonova holds undergraduate degrees from Sofia University and Mount Holyoke College. She obtained a PhD in government at Harvard University. Her doctoral advisor was Robert Keohane.

She was a Giorgio Ruffolo Fellow in Sustainability Science at Harvard University and a Senior Fernand Braudel Fellow at the European University Institute.

Her 2019 book Governance Entrepreneurs won the Chadwick F. Alger Prize for the best book on the subject of international organization and multilateralism, and the Harold and Margaret Sprout Award for the best book in environmental studies. Both are awarded by the International Studies Association.

She received the “Gender and Environment Advocate in Geneva” award in 2017.

== Publications ==
- Governance Entrepreneurs. International Organizations and the Rise of Global Public-Private Partnerships (Cambridge, Cambridge University Press) (2017)
- The Comparative Politics of Transnational Climate Governance co-edited with Thomas N. Hale and Charles Roger (Routledge) (2018)
- Transnational Climate Change Governance co-authored with Harriet Bulkeley et al. (Cambridge, Cambridge University Press) (2014)
- Transnational Politics of the Environment. EU Integration and Environmental Policy in Eastern Europe (Cambridge, MA, MIT Press) (2004)
