= Knut Langfeldt =

Norwegian organizational worker and political science writer

Knut Peder Langfeldt (14 January 1925 – 24 October 2018) was a Norwegian organizational worker and political science writer.

He lived at Slemdal at a young age. In May 1943, during the German occupation of Norway, he tried to flee the country by boat. However, he was discovered near Abelsnes. He was imprisoned in Flekkefjord, then three days at Arkivet in Kristiansand, before being moved to Møllergata 19. He remained here for a year, except for the time from August 1943 to March 1944 when he was at Ullevål Hospital. He was incarcerated at Grini concentration camp from 14 July 1944 to 4 May 1945.

The German occupation ended on 8 May 1945, and the roles changed. From May to September 1945 he worked as a prison guard for the now-imprisoned Nazis and collaborators. He also joined the Young Communist League of Norway, and came in contact with Peder Furubotn. Furubotn arranged the drafting of Langfeldt into the Parteihochschule Karl Marx in what would become East Berlin, and here he was a contact between the Communist Party of Norway (who knew him only by the pseudonym Karl Quandt) and the German socialist party (who knew him as Kurt Lindenberg). Langfeldt was not a Communist Party member, however. He studied at the college from 1947 to 1949, and later studied at the University of Oslo. From 1957 to 1961 he lived in Geneva, studying for two years and being a correspondent for Dagbladet in the last two years. He worked as information director in the National Insurance Administration before working in the Norwegian Association of Local and Regional Authorities from 1968 to 1992.

In 1962 he, together with Jacques Freymond, Henri Burgelin and Miklós Molnár, co-published the 800-page work La Première Internationale on the First International. In the Norwegian language he published the books Moskvatesene i norsk politikk in 1961 and Det direkte demokrati: Rådsrepublikk eller parlamentarisme? in 1966, as well as articles in Historisk Tidsskrift and Samtiden.

Langfeldt has been active in Amnesty International. He married a Swiss woman, and had two children. He resided in Nordstrand. He died in October 2018.
