= Suerie Moon =

American public health researcher

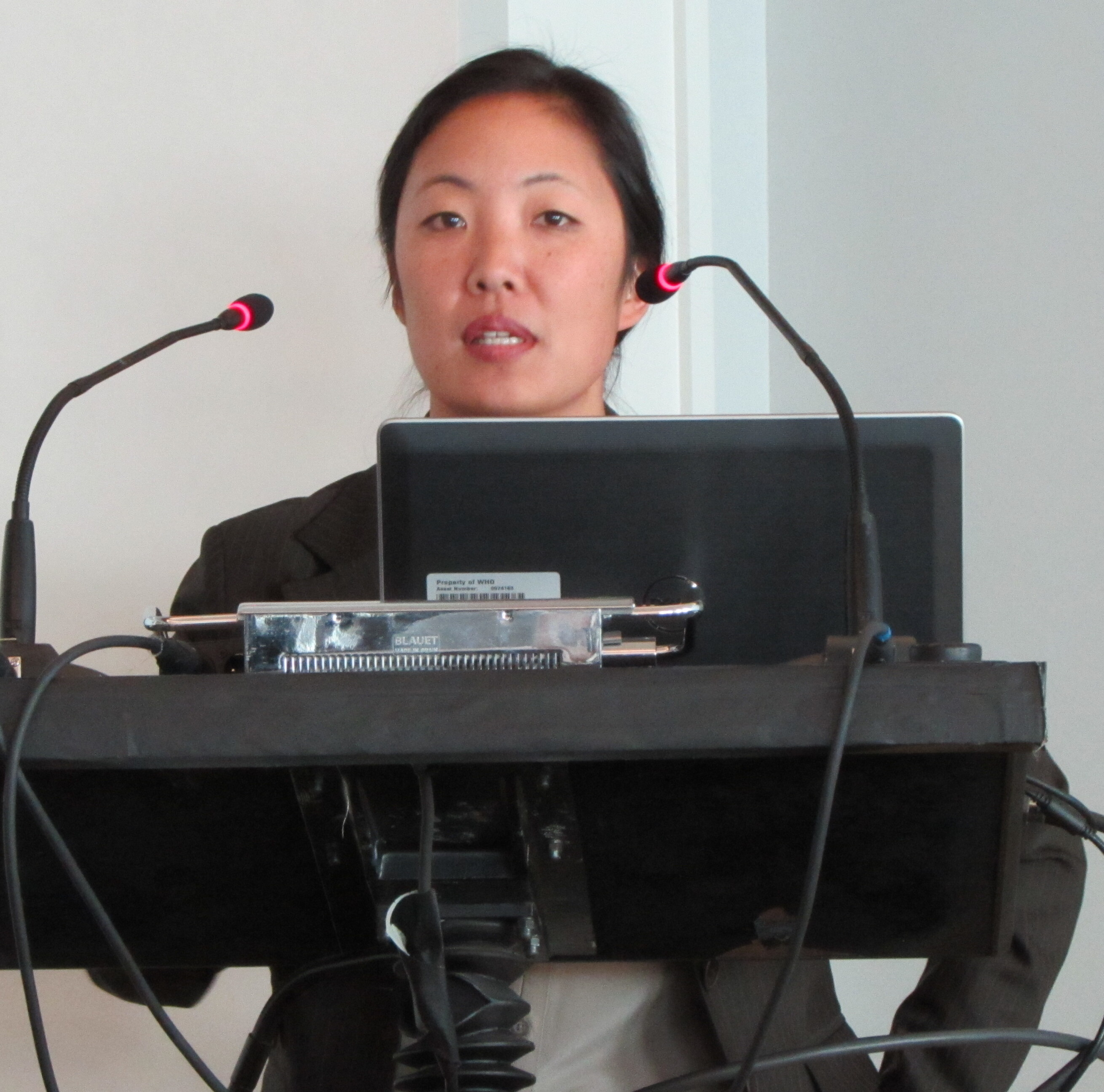
- Moon speaks at UNITAID Market Forum in 2014.
- Education: Yale University; Princeton University; Harvard University
- Scientific career
- Workplaces: Graduate Institute of International and Development Studies; Harvard T.H. Chan School of Public Health; Médecins Sans Frontières; Peace Corps
- Thesis: Embedding neoliberalism : global health and the evolution of the global intellectual (2010)

Suerie Moon is an American public health expert who is Professor of Practice at the Graduate Institute of International and Development Studies. Her research considers global health, health equity and pandemic preparedness.

== Early life and education ==
Moon became interested in health inequality as a child. She was one of five children born in the United States to South Korean immigrant parents. Moon studied history at Yale University. The North Korean famine prompted Moon to study international affairs. She moved to Princeton University for graduate studies, where she specialized in international relations, and Harvard University to study public policy. Her doctoral research considered neoliberalism and global health. Moon joined the Peace Corps, where she worked on public health education in South Africa. She started working at Médecins Sans Frontières shortly after graduating, when HIV was becoming more prevalent and access to treatment was rare.

== Research and career ==
Moon was a lecturer at the Harvard T.H. Chan School of Public Health. She worked as a special advisor to Julio Frenk, and studied how to navigate politics to bring about changes in public health. She was Director of the Harvard-LSHTM panel on the Global Response to Ebola, which she believes encouraged the World Health Organization to prioritise outbreak control. She co-founded the Forum on Global Governance for Health.

In 2016, Moon joined the Graduate Institute of International and Development Studies as Professor of Practice. Moon works at the interface of research and policy in global health. She looks to define the functions required to protect global health and to better understand power disparities that contribute to health inequity. Moon has driven initiatives to improve global access to medicines (e.g. by advocating for new business models for research and development in pharmaceuticals) and to strengthen governance of outbreak preparedness.

In the aftermath of the COVID-19 pandemic, Moon became involved with the World Health Organization Pandemic Accord.

== Selected publications ==
- Ole Petter Ottersen; Jashodhara Dasgupta; Chantal Blouin; et al. (11 February 2014). "The political origins of health inequity: prospects for change". The Lancet. 383 (9917): 630–667. doi:10.1016/s0140-6736(13)62407-1. ISSN 0140-6736. PMID 24524782. Wikidata Q38441435.
- Suerie Moon; Devi Sridhar; Muhammad A Pate; et al. (November 2015). "Will Ebola change the game? Ten essential reforms before the next pandemic. The report of the Harvard-LSHTM Independent Panel on the Global Response to Ebola". The Lancet. 386 (10009): 2204–2221. doi:10.1016/s0140-6736(15)00946-0. ISSN 0140-6736. PMC 7137174. PMID 26615326. Wikidata Q24574408.
- Julio Frenk; Suerie Moon (1 March 2013). "Governance challenges in global health". The New England Journal of Medicine. 368 (10): 936–942. doi:10.1056/nejmra1109339. ISSN 0028-4793. PMID 23465103. Wikidata Q38452687.
