= Geneva school (economics) =

The Geneva school is a school of economic thought based in the Geneva Graduate Institute in Switzerland in the 1930s.

== Overview ==
Historian Quinn Slobodian proposed in 2018 the existence of a so-called Geneva School of economics to describe a group of economists who rallied around the Geneva Graduate Institute in Switzerland in the 1930s as they fled the rise of totalitarianism in Europe. The Geneva School describes the intellectual project of Ludwig von Mises, Wilhelm Röpke, Friedrich Hayek and Michael A. Heilperin, who formed an intellectual community with employees of the Geneva-based General Agreement on Tariffs and Trade (GATT) and of the League of Nations such as Gottfried Haberler. Slobodian describes them as "ordo-globalists" who promoted the creation of global institutions to safeguard the unimpeded movement of capital across borders. The Geneva School combined the "Austrian emphasis on the limits of knowledge and the global scale with the German ordoliberal emphasis on institutions and the moment of the political decision." Geneva School economists were instrumental in organizing the Mont Pelerin Society, a neoliberal academic society of economists and political philosophers that assembled in nearby Mont Pélerin.
