= Geneva Graduate Institute =

Research university in Switzerland

Graduate Institute of International and Development Studies
- Institut de hautes études internationales et du développement
- Former name: Graduate Institute of International Studies (1927–2007)
- Type: Semi-private, semi-public graduate school University institute
- Established: 1927; 99 years ago
- Founders: William Rappard and Paul Mantoux
- Parent institution: University of Geneva (1927–2009)
- Affiliations: APSIA; Europaeum; EUA; ECUR; EADI; AUF; SUC
- Budget: CHF 111 million (2023)
- President: Katja Gentinetta (de)
- Director: Marie-Laure Salles
- Faculty: 153
- Postgraduates: 1,092 (86% international)
- Doctoral students: 343
- Location: Geneva, Switzerland; 46°13′15.8″N 6°8′37.3″E
- Campus: Urban
- Working languages: English; French
- Colours: Red Gray White
- Nicknames: Geneva Graduate Institute; IHEID
- Website: www.graduateinstitute.ch

The Graduate Institute of International and Development Studies (French: Institut de hautes études internationales et du développement, abbreviated IHEID), commonly referred to as the Geneva Graduate Institute, is a postgraduate research university in Geneva, Switzerland dedicated to international relations, development studies, and global governance.

Founded in 1927 by two senior League of Nations officials, the Geneva Graduate Institute was the world's first graduate school dedicated solely to the study of international affairs. With the Maison de la Paix acting as its primary campus, the Institute is located blocks from the United Nations Office at Geneva, the International Labour Organization, the World Trade Organization, World Health Organization, the International Committee of the Red Cross, the World Intellectual Property Organization and many other international organisations.

Today, the institute enrolls around a thousand graduate students from more than 100 countries, nearly 90% of whom are foreign-born. It is officially a bilingual English-French institution, although most classes are in English. A member of the Association of Professional Schools of International Affairs, it runs joint degree programmes with Colgate University, Smith College, Yale University, Amherst College, and McGill University, and is Harvard Kennedy School's only partner institution to co-deliver double degrees.

The Institute maintains strong links with the League of Nations's successor, the United Nations, where many alumni have gone on to work. Its graduates include a former secretary-general, seven assistant secretaries-general, and three under-secretaries-general. Alumni have also served as director-general of the International Atomic Energy Agency, the International Labour Organization, the World Intellectual Property Organization, the General Agreement on Tariffs and Trade, and commissioner-general of the United Nations Relief and Works Agency and the High Commissioner for Human Rights.

== History ==
=== Early years ===
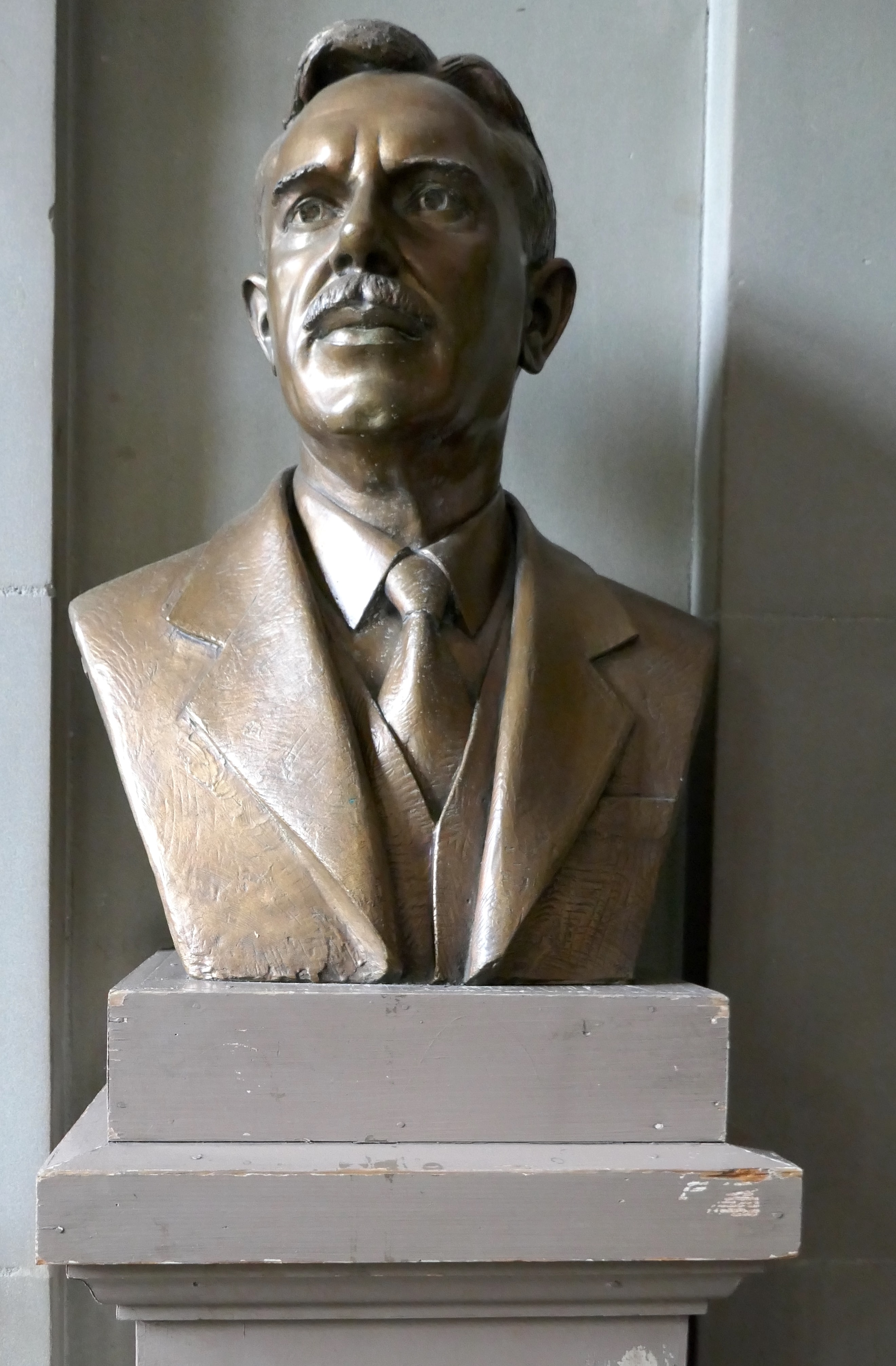
William Rappard

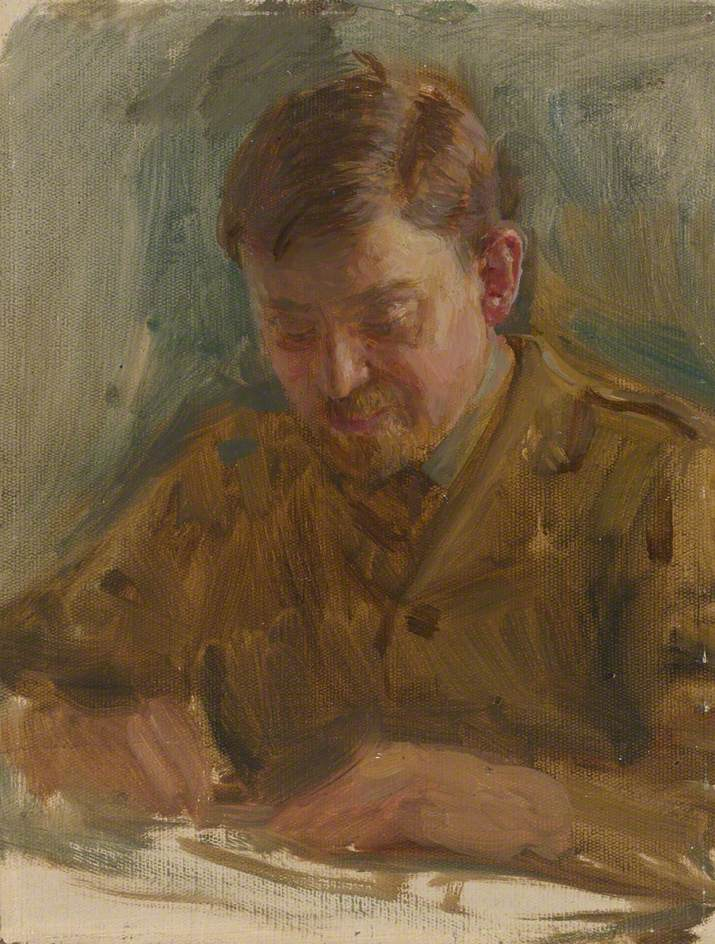
Paul Mantoux

The Graduate Institute of International Studies (French: Institut universitaire de hautes études internationales, HEI) was co-founded in 1927 by two scholar-diplomats working for the League of Nations Geneva secretariat: the Swiss-American William Rappard, director of the Mandates Section, and the Frenchman Paul Mantoux, director of the Political Section. Rappard, then rector of the University of Geneva, conceived the Graduate Institute as a way to draw on the deep pool of expertise in Geneva and to cement transatlantic ties. With the notion that it might be named the "Wilson Institute", after U.S. President Woodrow Wilson, Rappard saw it as a school for future American diplomats. The Institute was affiliated to the University of Geneva, though independent in its program of studies and personnel.

Initial funding was provided by the U.S.-based Laura Spelman Rockefeller Memorial Fund, which for its part conceived the Institute as playing the role of an "international economic observation post". The Swiss government and Canton of Geneva provided matching contributions. Funding from American philanthropic organizations, primarily the Rockefeller Foundation as part of its initiative to promote a scientific approach to international relations, continued until 1954.

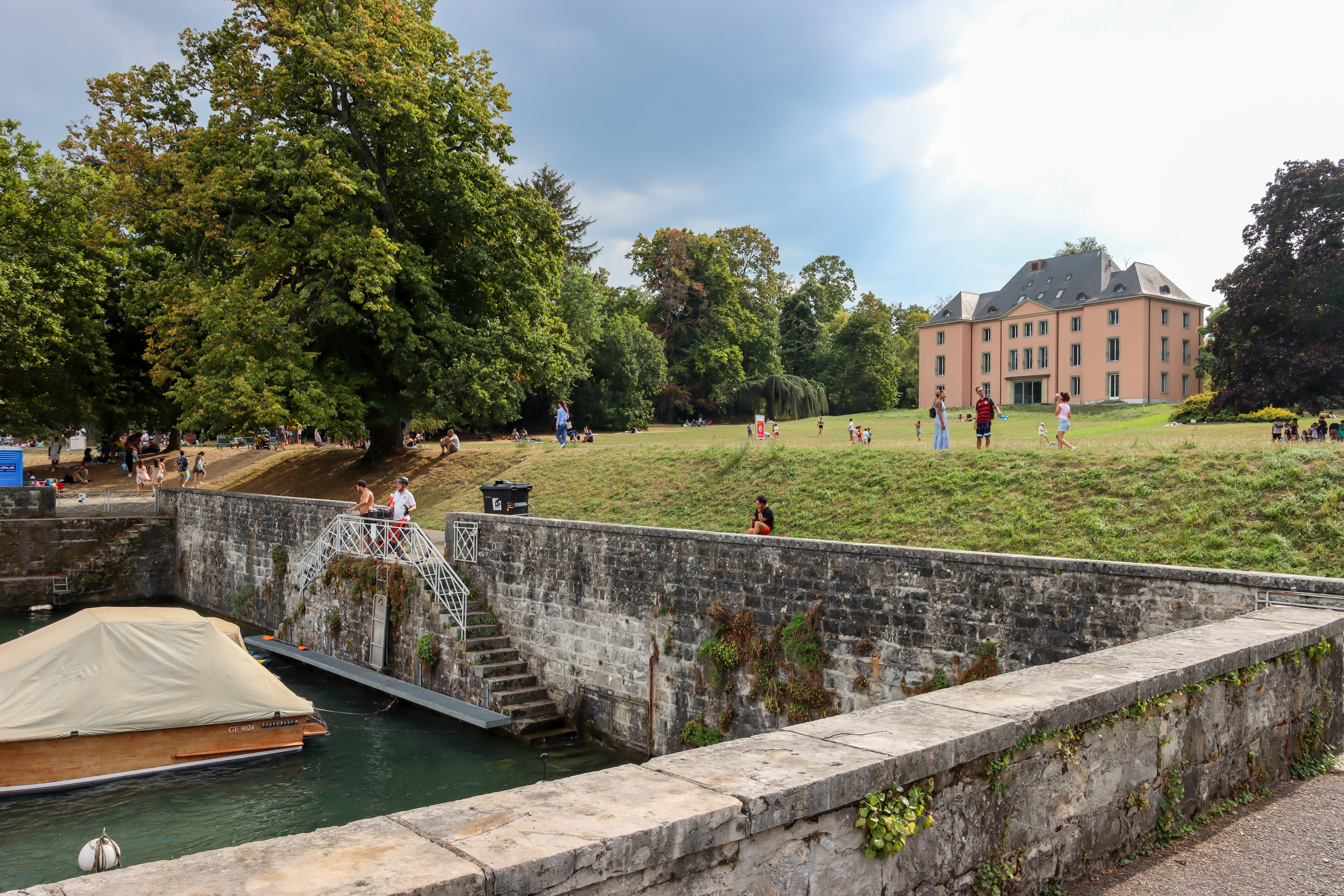
The Villa Barton campus on the shores of Lake Geneva

At the time, the Geneva Graduate Institute was "among the most important centres of scholarship" in international relations alongside other schools, mostly located in Europe, including the Institute of Higher International Studies in Paris, the Deutsche Hochschule für Politik in Berlin, the Diplomatic Academy of Vienna, and the Walsh School of Foreign Service in the United States. In the 1920s, London School of Economics (LSE) director William Beveridge wrote that he regarded the Geneva Graduate Institute as a competing centre for the emerging study of international relations, arguing that LSE offered a superior setting for prolonged academic work in the field.

The Geneva Graduate Institute's original mandate was based on a close working relationship with both the League of Nations and the International Labour Organization. It was agreed that in exchange for training staff and delegates, the Institute would receive intellectual resources and diplomatic expertise (guest lecturers, etc.) from the aforementioned organisations. According to its statutes, the Geneva Graduate Institute was "an institution intended to provide students of all nations the means of undertaking and pursuing international studies, most notably of a historic, judicial, economic, political and social nature".

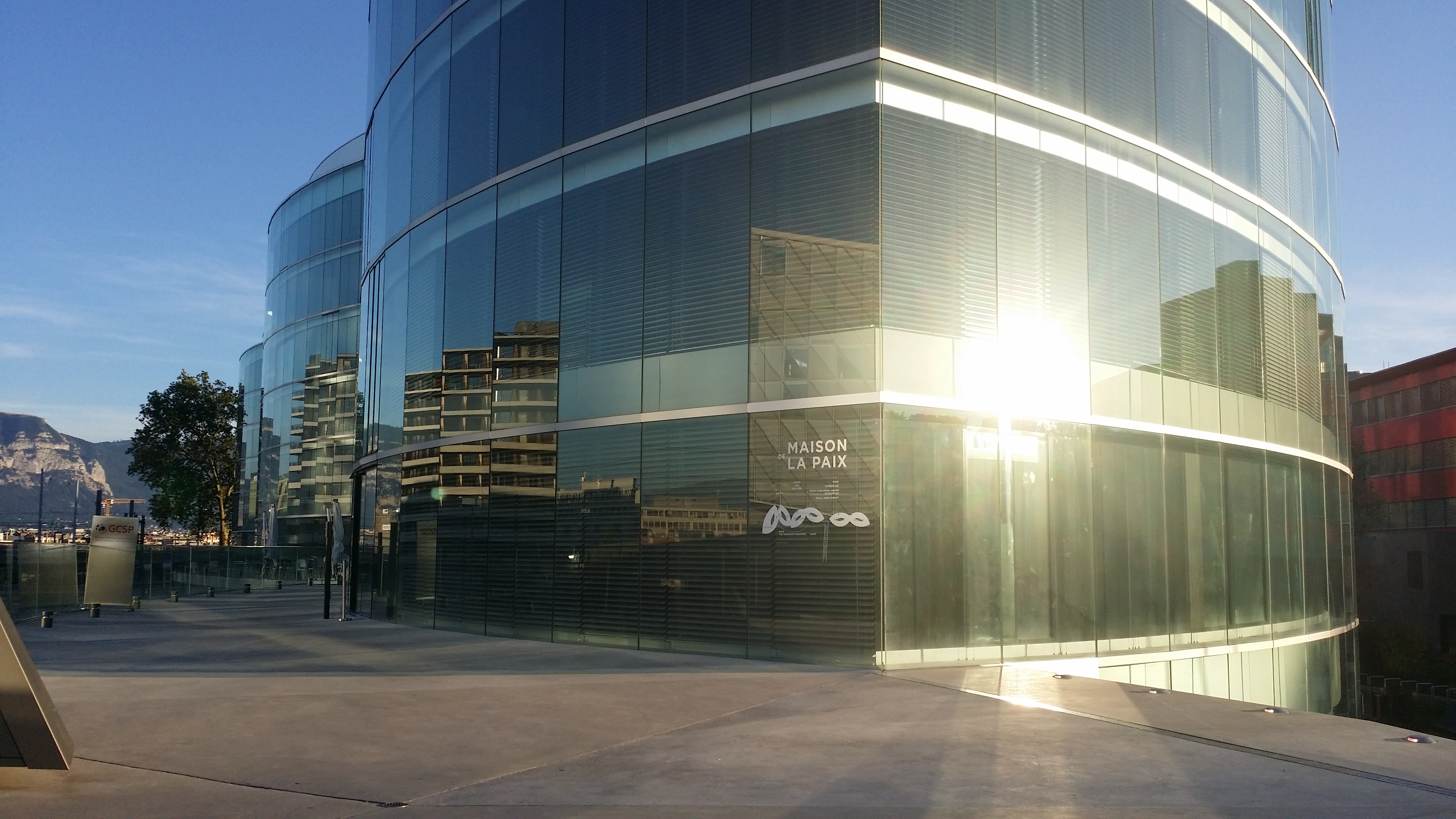
Maison de la paix

To fulfill its mission, the Geneva Graduate Institute developed starting in the mid-1920s a system of summer cours temporaires (temporary courses), known as the Geneva Institute of International Relations, with financial support by the Carnegie Endowment for International Peace. The courses were given by guest lecturers on a weekly, semester, or yearly basis. They attracted scholars like Raymond Aron, René Cassin, Luigi Einaudi, John Kenneth Galbraith, G. P. Gooch, Gottfried Haberler, Friedrich von Hayek, Hersch Lauterpacht, Lord McNair, Gunnar Myrdal, Harold Nicolson, Philip Noel Baker, Pierre Renouvin, Lionel Robbins, Jean-Rodolphe de Salis, Harold Laski, Eric Voegelin, Carlo Sforza, Jacob Viner, Quincy Wright and Martin Wight.

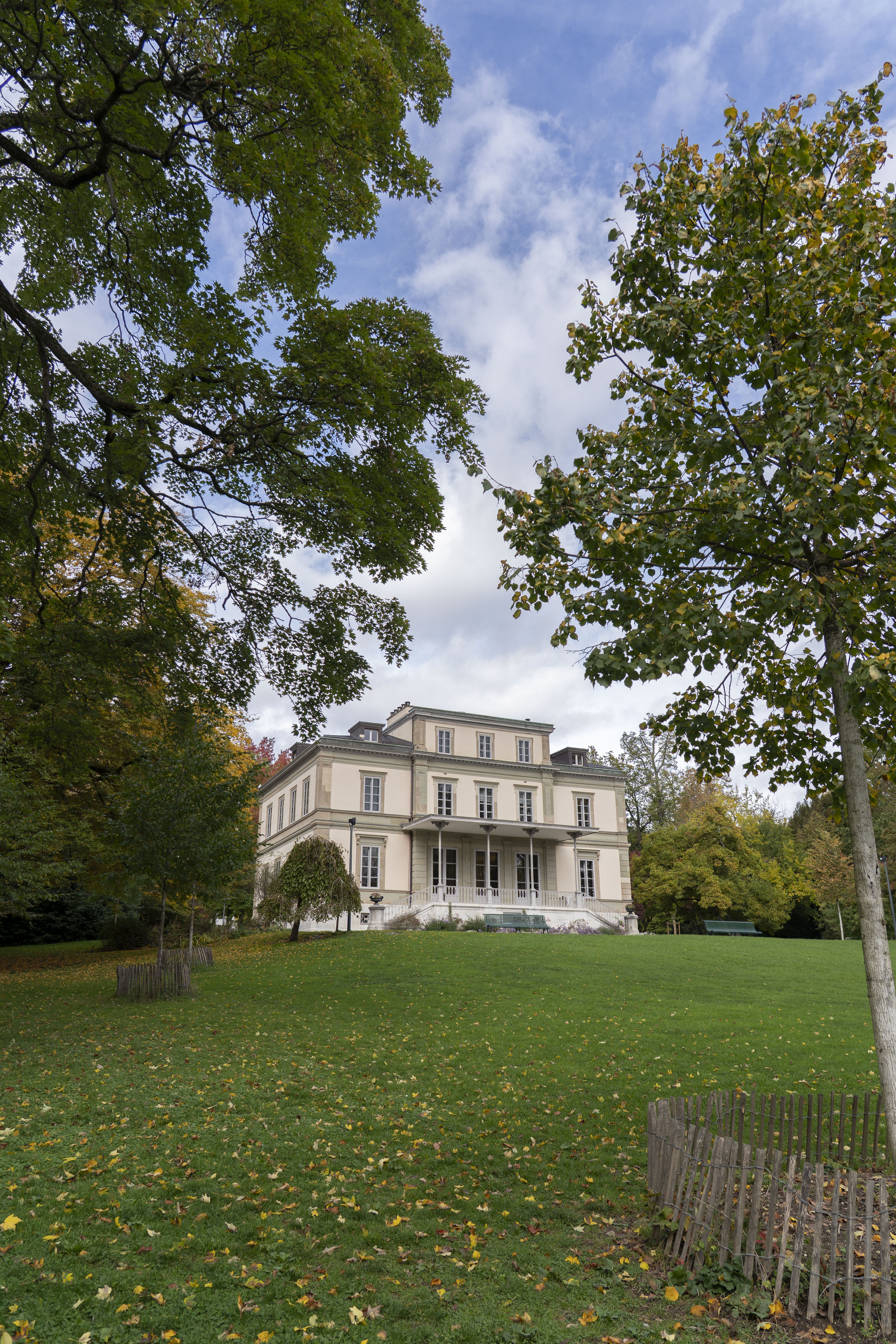
The Villa Moynier campus

A different initiative, the Geneva School of International Studies, also offered summer programs at the Geneva Graduate Institute starting in 1923. These schools were created by international politics professor Alfred Zimmern and his wife, the pianist Lucie Barbier Zimmern. They were funded by John D. Rockefeller, Jr. and several other wealthy American donors. They attracted hundreds of students yearly and proved particularly popular with American students. They also attracted luminaries such as Jane Addams and John Maynard Keynes. The "Geneva Schools" or "Zimmern Schools", as they became known, were taught by leading scholars like Louis Eisenmann, Ernst Jäckh, Paul Mantoux, and Arnold J. Toynbee alongside a variety of "public men" such as Edvard Beneš, Lord David Cecil, Paul Hymans, Fridtjof Nansen, and Arthur Salter, 1st Baron Salter. The last Geneva School was held in 1939.

=== World War II ===
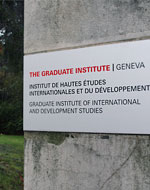
IHEID's earlier logo at Villa Barton's main gate

The Geneva Graduate Institute had become known in the 1930s as a rallying point for neoliberal scholars, with economist Lionel Robbins calling it an "oasis of sanity" amid the rise of totalitarianism in Europe. It attracted leading neoliberal economists including Ludwig Von Mises, Wilhelm Röpke and Michael A. Heilperin, who formed an intellectual community with employees of the nearby General Agreement on Tariffs and Trade and League of Nations secretariats, such as Gottfried Haberler, and with academics who presented key research at the Geneva Graduate Institute, including Friedrich Hayek and Lionel Robbins. Historian Quinn Slobodian proposed in 2018 the existence of a so-called Geneva School of economics to describe this group of economists and political economists, whom he characterizes as "ordo-globalists" who promoted the creation of global institutions to safeguard the unimpeded movement of capital across borders. The Geneva School combined the "Austrian emphasis on the limits of knowledge and the global scale with the German ordoliberal emphasis on institutions and the moment of the political decision". Geneva School economists were instrumental in organizing the Mont Pelerin Society, a neoliberal academic society of economists and political philosophers that assembled in nearby Mont Pèlerin.

Other faculty fleeing countries with Nazi regimes also included Hans Wehberg and Georges Scelle for law, Maurice Bourquin for diplomatic history, and Swiss jurist Paul Guggenheim. Subsequently, more scholars would join the Institute's faculty. Hans Kelsen, theorist and philosopher of law, Guglielmo Ferrero, Italian historian, and Carl Burckhardt, scholar and diplomat were employed at the Geneva Graduate Institute.

=== Expansion ===
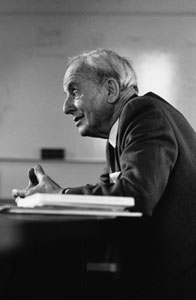
Jacques Freymond

With the Rockefeller Foundation ending its funding in 1954, the Canton of Geneva and the Swiss government began to bear most of the costs associated with the Institute. This transfer of financial responsibility coincided with the arrival of Rappard's successor as the Institute's director, historian Jacques Freymond in 1955. Freymond inaugurated a period of great expansion, increasing the range of subjects taught and the number of both students and faculty. Nevertheless, the school remained small during that period. Before the 1980s, the faculty never exceeded 25 members. Under Freymond's tenure, the Geneva Graduate Institute hosted many international colloquia that discussed preconditions for East–West negotiations, relations with China and its rising influence in world affairs, European integration, techniques and results of politico-socioeconomic forecasting (the early Club of Rome reports, and the Futuribles project led by Bertrand de Jouvenel), the causes and possible antidotes to terrorism, and Pugwash Conference concerns. Freymond's term also saw many landmark publications, including the Treatise on international law by Paul Guggenheim and the six-volume compilation of historical documents relating to the Communist International. In the 1980s, after the end of Freymond's tenure, Geneva Graduate Institute faculty members, including Ernst-Ulrich Petersmann and Jan Tumlir, played a significant role in reforming and transforming the General Agreement on Tariffs and Trade into the World Trade Organization.

=== Reorganization ===
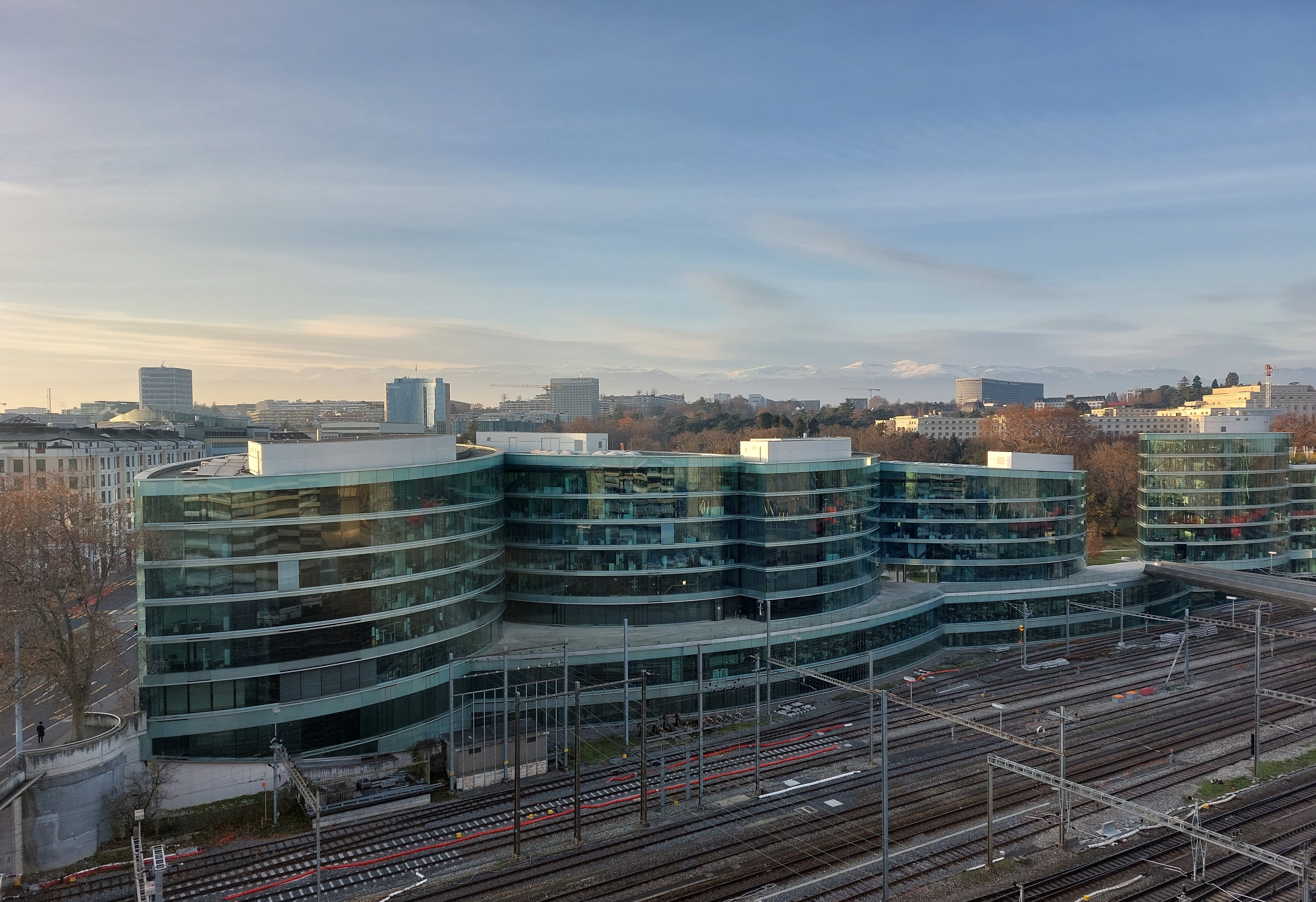
Maison de la paix

In 2008, the Graduate Institute of International Studies absorbed the Graduate Institute of Development Studies (French: Institut universitaire d’études du développement, IUED), and was thereby renamed as the Graduate Institute of International and Development Studies. IUED was founded by historian Jacques Freymond in 1961 as the Centre genevois pour la formation des cadres africains, later renamed Institut Africain de Genève, or African Institute of Geneva. It was among the first institutions in Europe to develop the scholarly field of sustainable development. It was also known for the critical view of many of its professors on development aid, as well as for its journal, the Cahiers de l'IUED.

In 2009, the Geneva Graduate Institute ended its previous affiliation with the University of Geneva when it became an independent, Swiss government-accredited university. Prior to this, its accreditation had depended on its partnership with the University of Geneva. The master's and doctoral degrees originally awarded by the Geneva Graduate Institute and the University of Geneva were transferred to the Geneva Graduate Institute, while the bachelor's degree in international relations, formerly awarded by the Graduate Institute of International Studies, was taken over by the University of Geneva. Since 2016, student registration has also been transferred from the University of Geneva to the Geneva Graduate Institute.

A loose partnership with the University of Geneva has remained in place including through joint schools (Geneva Academy of International Humanitarian Law and Human Rights and Geneva Center for International Dispute Settlement) and joint degrees.

== Academics ==
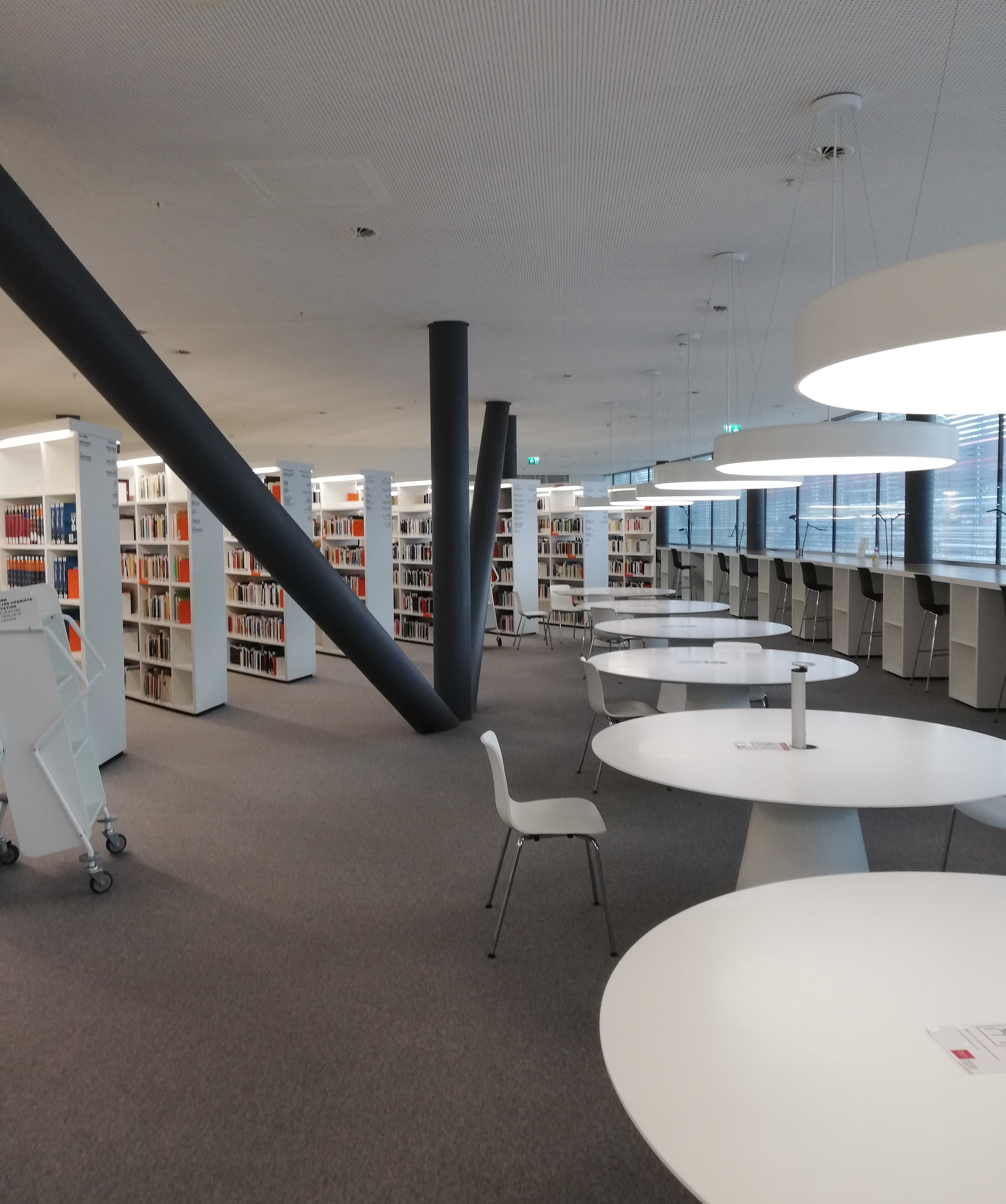
Kathryn and Shelby Cullom Davis Library

The Geneva Graduate Institute has nearly 1,100 students. Of these, about a third are PhD students, and two thirds are master's students. Fourteen percent come from Switzerland. The remainder come from more than 100 other countries. Around 63% are women. Admission to the Geneva Graduate Institute's study programs is highly competitive, with nearly 2,200 candidates applying for 430 available spots in 2026 -- a five to one ratio.

=== Departments ===
The Geneva Graduate Institute maintains five academic departments each headed by a faculty chair. They are the departments of international law; international relations & political science; international history & politics; international economics; and anthropology and sociology.

=== Study programmes ===
The Institute only offers master- and PhD-level programmes. The Geneva Graduate Institute offers seven master programmes, four executive master programmes, and five PhD programmes. They include masters in International and Development Studies; International Law; International Relations/Political Science; International History and Politics; International Economics; Anthropology and Sociology, Sustainable Finance and Development, and PhDs in International Law; International Relations/Political Science; International History and Politics; International Economics; Anthropology and Sociology.

=== Research ===
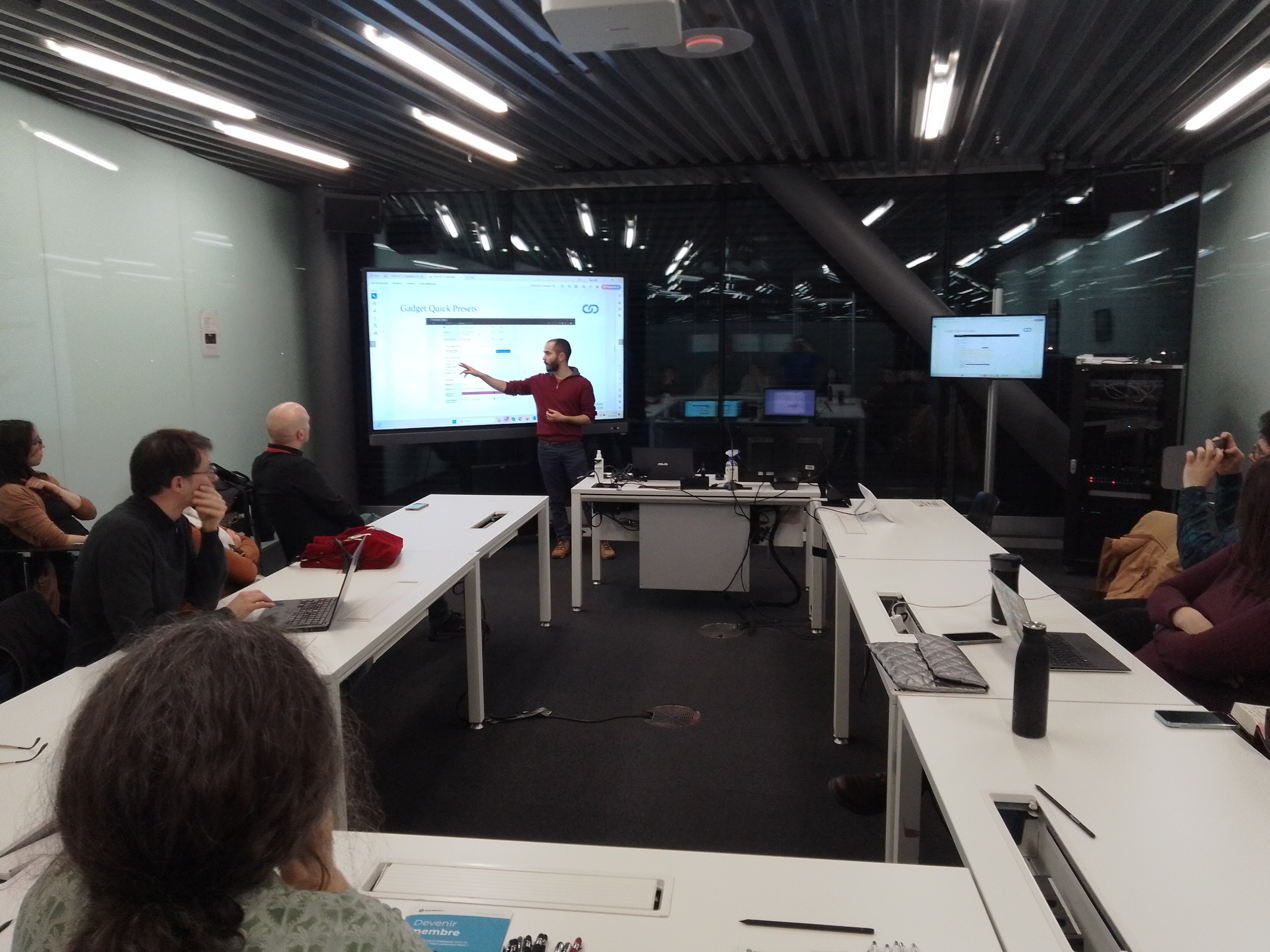
Seminar at the Geneva Graduate Institute

The Institute is home to twelve research centers. They are the Albert Hirschman Centre on Democracy, the Centre for Digital Humanities and Multilateralism, the Centre for Finance and Development, the Center for Trade and Economic Integration, the Centre on Conflict, Development and Peacebuilding, the Hoffmann Centre for Global Sustainability, the Gender Centre, the Global Governance Centre, the NORRAG Global Education Centre, the Global Migration Centre, and the Global Health Centre. Additionally, the Small Arms Survey, the Global Commission on Drug Policy, and the Geneva Centre on Knowledge Governance, a joint initiative with American University, are housed at the Geneva Graduate Institute. The Institute is also home to the Geneva International Sanctions Network, an academic network focused on the effectiveness of international sanctions headed by professor Thomas J. Biersteker.

In addition, the Geneva Graduate Institute runs three specialized schools jointly with the University of Geneva. They are the Geneva Academy of International Humanitarian Law and Human Rights, the Geneva Centre of Humanitarian Studies and the Geneva Center for International Dispute Settlement.

=== Rankings ===
As a small institution offering exclusively graduate programmes, the Geneva Graduate Institute does not participate in university rankings of comprehensive universities. However, It has been ranked by a handful of specialized rankings.

Foreign Policy Rankings
Year	Master	PhD
2024	20th	20th
2018	29th	/
2014	24th	/

QS World University Rankings by Subject (2026)
Development Studies	45
Politics	95
Law and Legal Studies	101-150

EduRank by Subject (2026)
International Law	6
Human Rights Law	36
International Relations and Diplomacy	62

In Foreign Policy's 2024 Inside the Ivory Tower ranking of best international relations schools worldwide, both U.S. international relations faculty and U.S. think tank staffers ranked the Geneva Graduate Institute's master's programs 20th. In Europe, only the master's programs of the London School of Economics and Political Science, Sciences Po and the University of Oxford also ranked in the master's top 20. Meanwhile, the PhD programs for policymakers ranked 20th worldwide when assessed by U.S. international relations faculty, 23rd when ranked by U.S. policymakers, and 26th when ranked by U.S. think tank staffers. The other Europe-based PhD programs for policymakers listed in the top 20 by U.S. international relations faculty were at the universities of Oxford and Cambridge, the London School of Economics, and Sciences Po. In 2012, The Geneva Graduate Institute was listed among the Foreign Policy Association's "Top 50 International Affairs Graduate Programs".

The Graduate Institute's LL.M. consistently ranks in the top 10 LL.M. for public international law compiled by the website LLM Guide. In addition, the LL.M. in international dispute settlement, offered jointly with the University of Geneva, ranked 2nd worldwide according to a 2012 survey of law firms conducted by the Global Arbitration Review. The program also consistently ranks in the top 10 LL.M. for alternative dispute resolution in the LLM Guide. Finally, the Geneva Academy of International Humanitarian Law and Human Rights' LL.M. in international humanitarian law and human rights, a joint programme with the University of Geneva, also ranks in the world's top 10 according to the LLM Guide's ranking.

== Campus ==
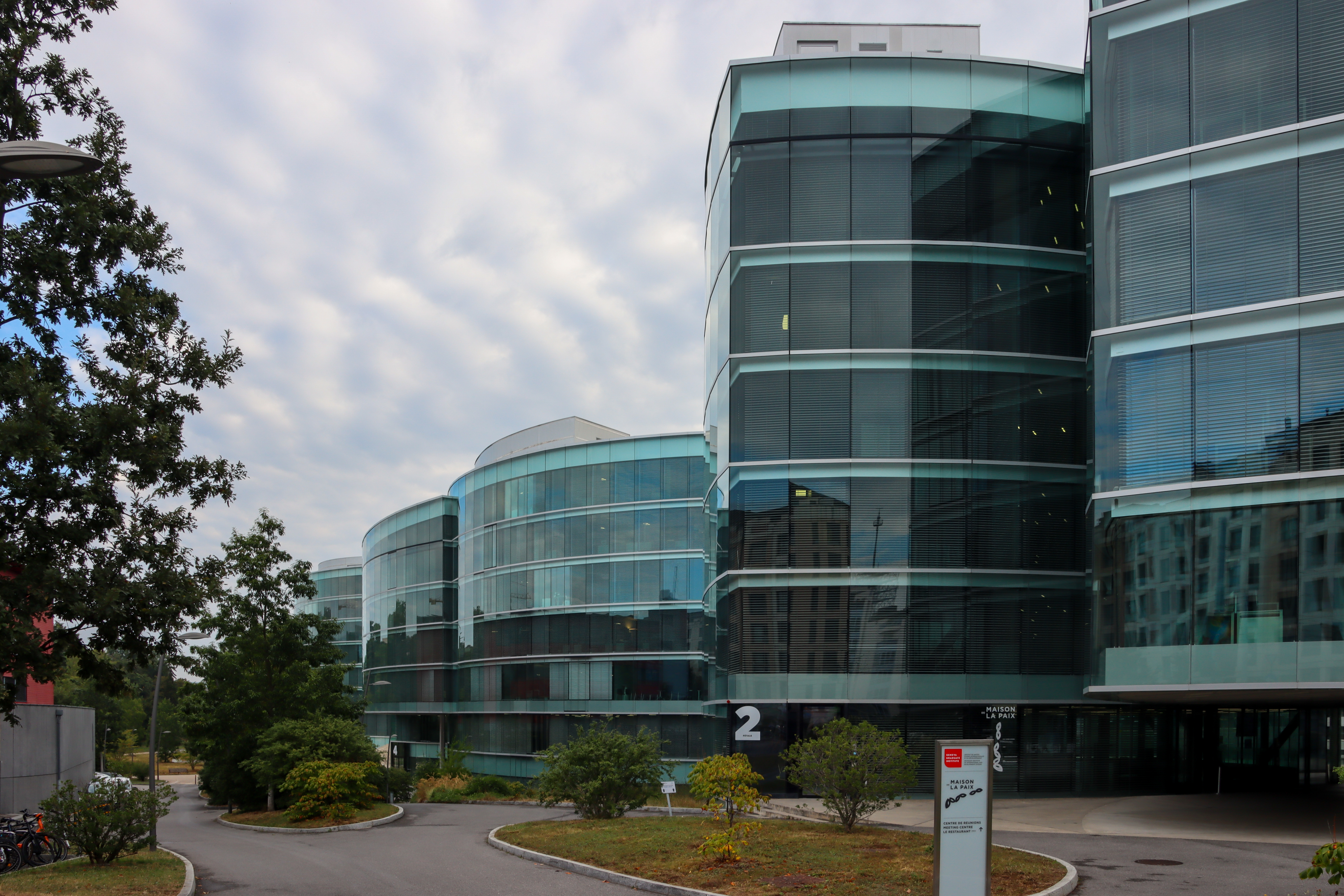
Maison de la paix

The Campus de la paix is a network of buildings extending from Place des Nations (the United Nations Headquarters in Geneva) to the shores of Lake Geneva, spanning two public parks: Parc Barton and Parc Moynier.

=== Maison de la paix ===
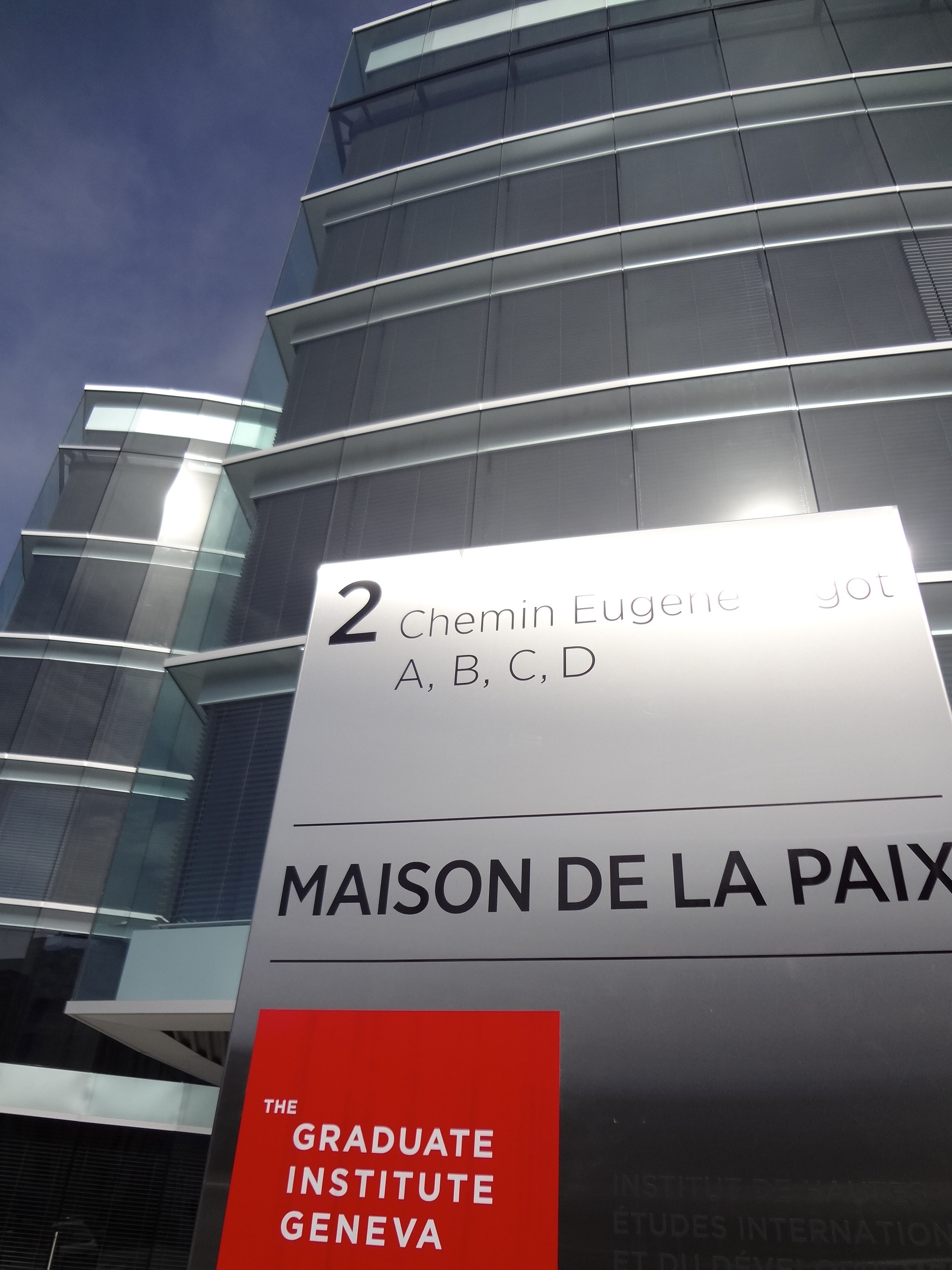
Maison de la paix

The Graduate Institute's main campus is the Maison de la paix (lit. "House of Peace"), which opened in 2013. The Maison de la Paix is a 38,000 meter-square glass building distributed into six connected sections. It contains the Kathryn and Shelby Cullom Davis Library, which holds 350,000 books about social sciences, journals and annual publications, making it one of Europe's richest libraries in the fields of development and international relations. It is named after two Institute alumni, Ambassador Shelby Cullom Davis and his wife Kathryn Davis, following the Davis' $10 million donation to the Institute.

In addition to serving as the institute's main campus, the Maison de la paix also houses policy centres and advocacy groups with close ties to the Institute such as the Geneva Centre for the Democratic Control of Armed Forces, the Geneva Centre for Security Policy, the Geneva International Centre for Humanitarian Demining, Interpeace, the International Institute of Humanitarian Law and the World Business Council for Sustainable Development.

=== Historic villas ===
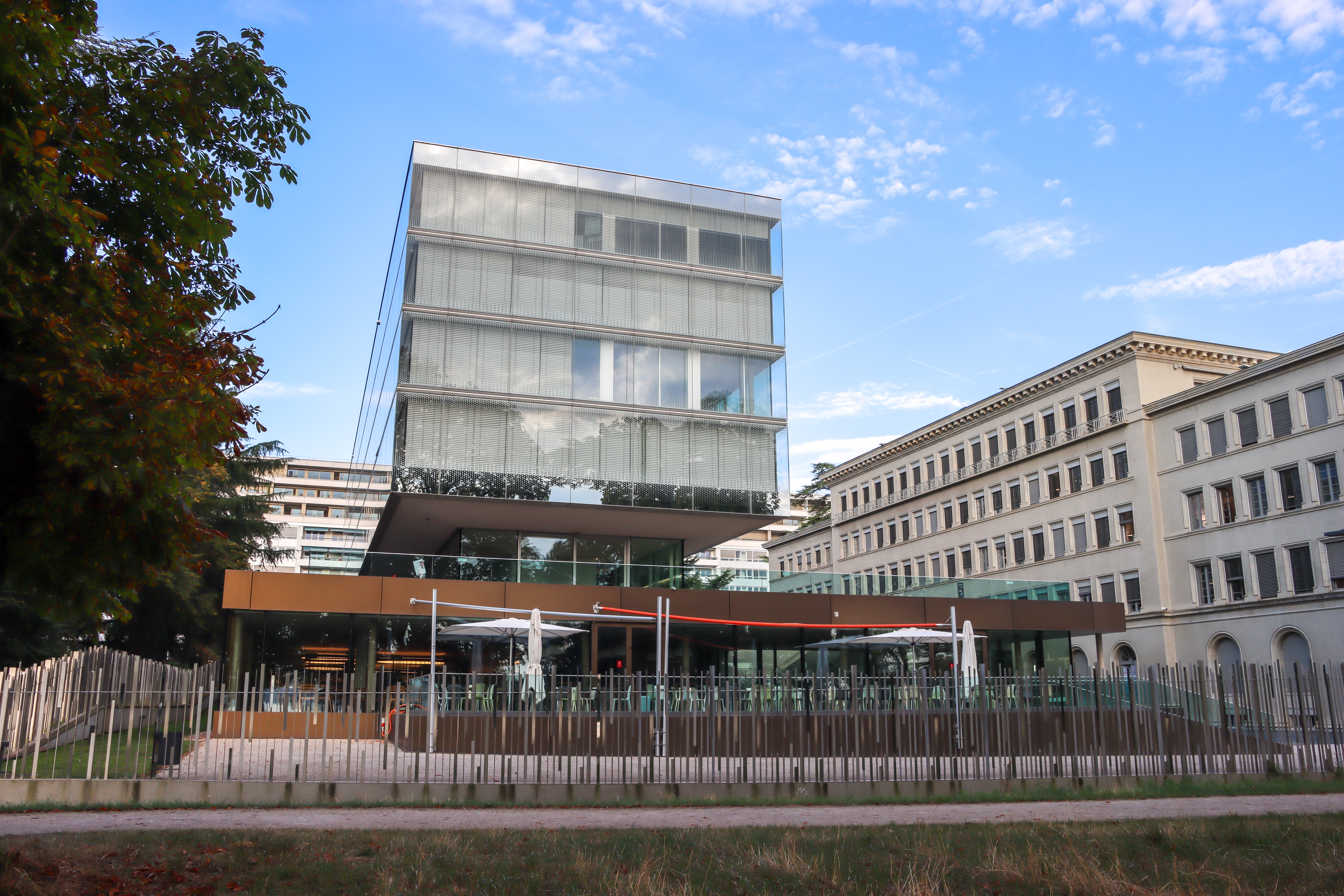
Centre William Rappard

Another section of the campus are two historic villas situated by Lake Geneva, Villa Barton and Villa Moynier. Villa Barton served as the institute's main campus from 1937 to 2007. It now mostly houses administrative staff. Adjacent to Villa Barton, the World Trade Organization's headquarters, known as the Centre William Rappard, housed the Geneva Graduate Institute's library during that period.

Villa Moynier, since 2009, houses the Institute-based Geneva Academy of International Humanitarian Law and Human Rights and Geneva Center for International Dispute Settlement. The building holds a symbolic significance as it was originally owned by Gustave Moynier, co-founder of the International Committee of the Red Cross (ICRC), and subsequently used by the League of Nations and as the headquarters of the ICRC between 1933 and 1946.

At the time of the Geneva Graduate Institute's founding in the early 20th century, the Institute was briefly housed in an hôtel particulier, located at Promenade du Pin 5, that now houses Geneva's Library of Art and Archeology (fr).

=== Student housing ===
Street protest along the Edgar and Danièle de Picciotto Student Residence

The Geneva Graduate Institute owns and operates two halls of residence in Geneva. The Edgar and Danièle de Picciotto Student Residence neighbors the main campus, Maison de la paix. It was completed in 2012 and provides 135 apartments for students and visiting professors. The Grand Morillon Student Residence opened to students in 2021 and accommodates 678 residents. It was designed by Japanese architect Kengo Kuma.

== Publications ==
- Journal of International Dispute Settlement was established by the Geneva Graduate Institute and the University of Geneva in 2010, the JIDS is dedicated to international law with commercial, economic and financial implications. It is published by Oxford University Press.
- Relations internationales publishes research on international relations history ranging from the end of the 19th century to recent history. It is a co-publication of the Paris 1 Panthéon-Sorbonne University and the Geneva Graduate Institute that is published by Presses universitaires de France.

== International relations ==
=== Partnerships ===
The Graduate Institute has exchange partnerships with the following institutions internationally:

- United States: American University, School of International Service, Boston University, School of Law, George Washington University, Elliott School, Harvard Law School, Tufts University, Fletcher School of Law and Diplomacy, University of California, Los Angeles, School of Law, University of Michigan, Law School, Seton Hall University, School of Diplomacy, Yale University, Graduate School of Arts and Sciences, Yale Jackson School of Global Affairs, Northwestern University, University of Pennsylvania Carey Law School
- Canada: Munk School of Global Affairs, University of Toronto, Université de Montréal
- Indonesia: Universitas Gadjah Mada
- Kazakhstan: KIMEP University
- South Korea: Seoul National University, Graduate School of International Studies, Ewha Womans University
- Singapore: National University of Singapore, Lee Kuan Yew School of Public Policy
- Malaysia: University of Malaya
- Japan: Waseda University, Graduate School of Asia-Pacific Studies, Sophia University
- China: Fudan University, School of International Relations and Public Affairs, Peking University, School of International Studies, University of Hong Kong, Faculty of Social Sciences, China Foreign Affairs University, Chinese University of Hong Kong, Shenzhen
- Turkey: Boğaziçi University
- India: Jawaharlal Nehru University
- Mexico: El Colegio de Mexico
- Peru: Pontificia Universidad Católica del Peru
- Brazil: Pontifícia Universidade Católica do Rio de Janeiro
- Colombia: Institute of International Relations, Universidad de Los Andes
- Italy: European University Institute, Università Bocconi, LUISS – Guido Carli Free International University for Social Studies, Ca' Foscari University of Venice
- Germany: Hertie School of Governance
- France: Sciences Po, Emlyon Business School, École normale supérieure Paris-Saclay
- Switzerland: University of St. Gallen, Global Health Institute, University of Geneva, Centre for Comparative and International Studies at ETH Zurich, University of Lucerne
- Austria: Central European University
- Egypt: American University, School of Global Affairs and Public Policy, Cairo
- Lebanon: American University of Beirut
- South Africa: Stellenbosch University
- Ghana: University of Ghana
- Australia: Melbourne School of Government, the University of Melbourne

=== Networks ===
The Graduate Institute is an active member of the following associations and academic networks: Association of Professional Schools of International Affairs, European University Association, Europaeum, European Consortium for Political Research, European Association of Development Research and Training Institutes, Agence Universitaire de la Francophonie, and Swiss University Conference.

== Social engagement ==
=== Academic awards ===
The Paul Guggenheim Prize in International Law was created in 1981 and is awarded on a biannual basis to honor the first monograph of young practitioners of international law. The Edgar de Picciotto International Prize is awarded every two years and worth 100,000 Swiss Francs. It rewards an internationally renowned academic whose research has contributed to enhancing the understanding of global challenges and whose work has influenced policy-makers.

=== Public lectures ===
The Geneva Graduate Institute organizes public lecture events. Recent guest speakers have included U.N. Secretary-Generals Antonio Guterres and Ban Ki-moon, U.N. High Commissioner for Refugees Filippo Grandi, U.N. High Commissioner for Human Rights Zeid Ra'ad al-Hussein, the Dalai Lama, former World Trade Organization director-general Pascal Lamy, Italian prime minister Mario Monti, British prime minister Gordon Brown, Liberian president Johnson Sirleaf, journalist and Nobel laureate Dmitry Muratov, Microsoft president Brad Smith, economists Jeffrey Sachs, Joseph Stiglitz, Paul Krugman, and Amartya Sen, historian Niall Ferguson, actress Angelina Jolie, and philosopher Michael Sandel.

== Administration ==
=== Leadership ===
The founding directors of the Graduate Institute of International Studies were Paul Mantoux (1927-1951) and William Rappard (1928-1955). The Institute was then headed by Jacques Freymond (1955-1978), Christian Dominicé (1978-1984), Lucius Caflisch (1984-1990), Alexandre Swoboda (1990-1998), Peter Tschopp (de) (1998-2002), Jean-Michel Jacquet (2002-2004) and Philippe Burrin (2004-2020). Its current director is Marie-Laure Salles.

=== Legal status ===
The Graduate Institute is a hybrid, public and private institution. It is constituted as a Swiss private law foundation, namely the Fondation pour les hautes études internationales et du développement, that fulfills a public purpose. The political responsibility for the Graduate Institute is shared between the Swiss Confederation and the canton of Geneva. The arrangement is unusual in Switzerland, where the cantons usually run public universities, with the exception of the federally-run ETH Zurich and École Polytechnique Fédérale de Lausanne.

=== Foundation Board ===
The Foundation Board is the administrative body of the Institute. It assembles academics, politicians, people of public life and practitioners. Its members have included Carlos Lopes (ex-U.N. under secretary general), Julia Marton-Lefèvre (former director general of the International Union for Conservation of Nature) and Jacques Marcovitch.

== Controversies ==
=== Remuneration of teaching and research assistants ===
Since 2022, some of the 60 or so PhD and master students and candidates employed by the Geneva Graduate Institute as teaching assistants and research assistants have repeatedly accused the school of underpaying them and circumventing Swiss labor laws. In September 2022, the school's administration aligned its teaching assistant and research assistant contracts with Geneva's hourly minimum wage laws by reducing the percentage of the work contract while maintaining the same workload. The students claim they live in "precarious" conditions and that their remuneration is “insufficient for a dignified life”. Some claim being unable to afford medicines and relying on food banks. Geneva is among the world's most expensive cities. The Geneva-based union Syndicat interprofessionnel de travailleuses et travailleurs (fr) (SIT) helped the students unsuccessfully petition the Grand Council of Geneva on the matter. It voted, in 2024, against referring the petition to the Council of State of Geneva and tabled it. In 2026, the Council of State of Geneva responded to a written question on the matter from a deputy; it defended the Institute's autonomy as a private-law foundation and declined to intervene. SIT has said the part-time 2022 contracts "do not in any way resolve the precariousness of assistants" and sought the hourly payment of work the students devote to writing their thesis. Marie-Laure Salles, the school's director, has said such labor "does not constitute a professional activity but rather personal training work which belongs exclusively to the doctoral student". Some students have criticized her handling of the situation, particularly in 2022 for allegedly interrupting negotiations over concerns that SIT's involvement "breached trust in the discussions".

=== Disability accessibility ===
Concerns about disability inclusion at the Geneva Graduate Institute have been documented across multiple sources. In June 2023, The Graduate Press, the institute's independent student publication, reported widespread physical accessibility barriers at the Maison de la Paix campus, including the absence of automatic door buttons on heavy hallway and bathroom doors, an insufficient and frequently out-of-service elevator system, stairs without ramps in major auditoriums and the library, steep corridor gradients difficult to navigate for wheelchair users, and classroom layouts that limit mobility for students using physical aids. The article noted that a Disability Taskforce had been established in 2022 under the institute's Gender, Diversity and Inclusion Initiative to address these issues, but that implementation of its recommendations depended on the institute's leadership making accessibility a funding priority.

In March 2026, the Swiss weekly WOZ Die Wochenzeitung reported on the case of a researcher at the Geneva Graduate Institute with a severe visual impairment, who had spent over two years attempting to obtain basic workplace accommodations, including a specialist monitor, an appropriately situated workstation, and a written support agreement with limited institutional response. The researcher, previously employed at universities in Germany and the Netherlands where standardized disability accommodation procedures were in place, described encountering institutional confusion about whether the employer bore any responsibility. She ultimately purchased required equipment with her own research funds. The article concludes that the shortcoming reflects a gap in Swiss domestic law: despite ratifying an international treaty guaranteeing the rights of persons with disabilities, Switzerland has not obliged private employers to make reasonable accommodations for disabled workers.

== Notable people ==
=== Alumni ===
The Graduate Institute has more than 25,000 alumni working around the world. Notable alumni and faculty include one UN Secretary-General (Kofi Annan), seven Nobel Prize recipients, one Pulitzer Prize winner, and numerous ambassadors, foreign ministers, and heads of state.

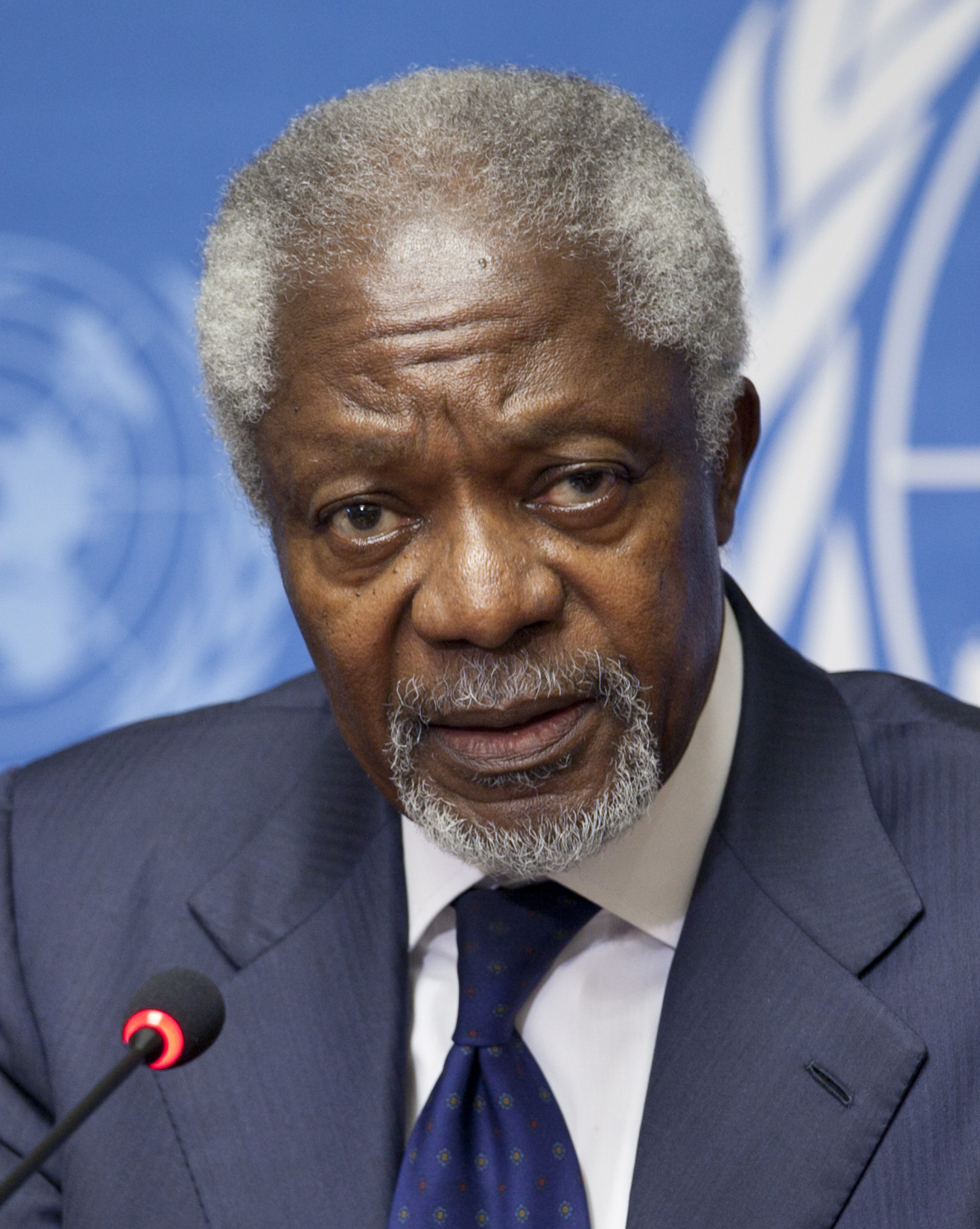
Kofi Annan (DEA 1962), former secretary-general of the United Nations and 2001 Nobel Peace Prize winner

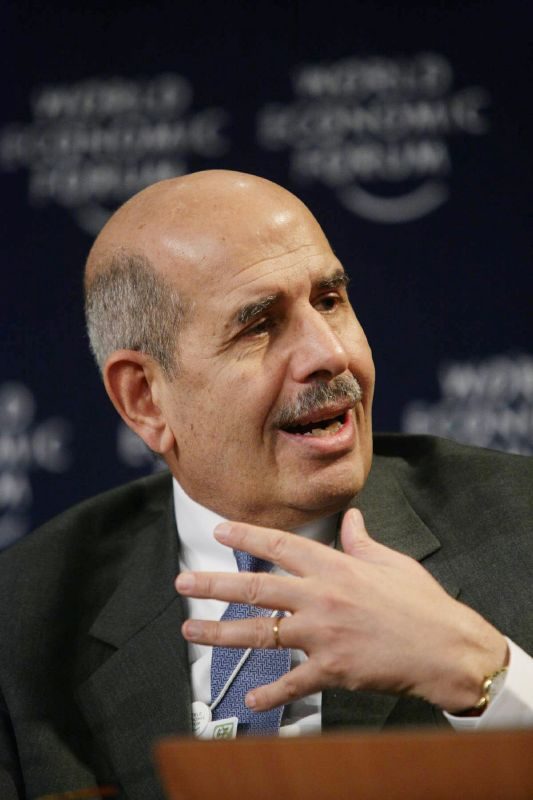
Mohamed ElBaradei (DEA 1964), former director general of International Atomic Energy Agency and 2005 Nobel Peace Prize winner

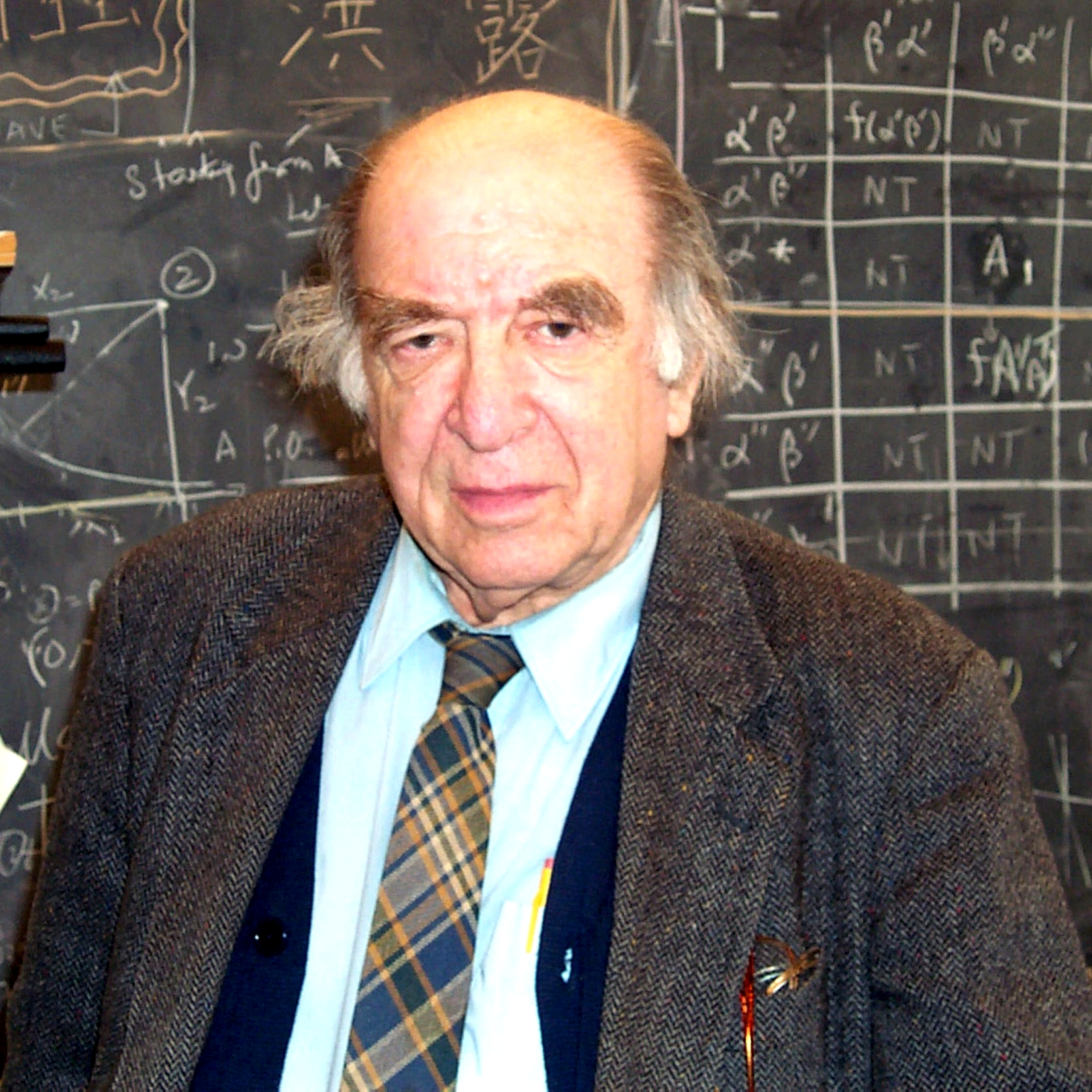
Leonid Hurwicz (1940), 2007 winner of the Nobel Memorial Prize in Economics

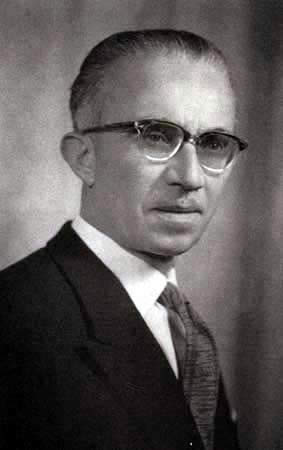
Nazim al-Qudsi (PhD 1927), former president of Syria

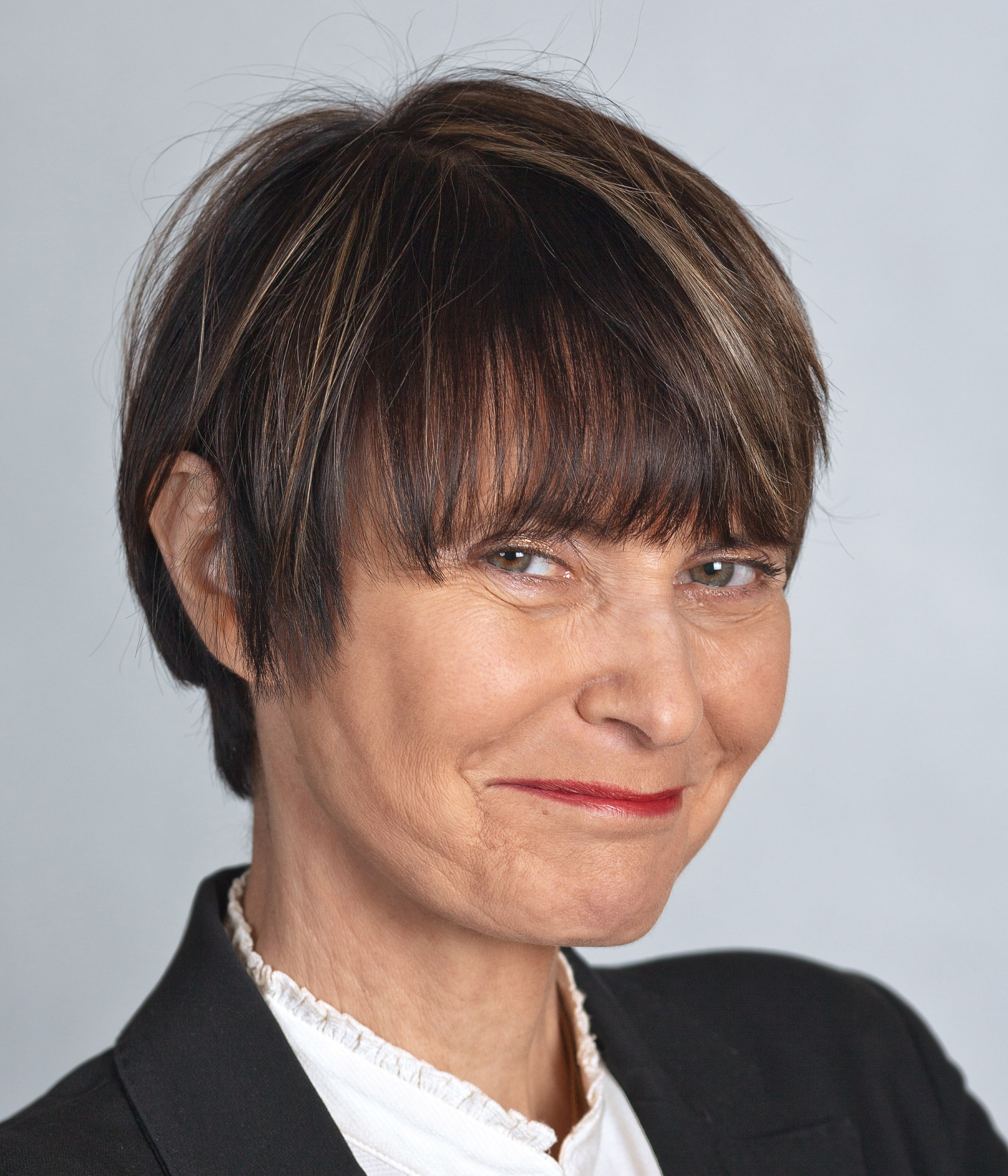
Micheline Calmy-Rey (Licence 1968), former president of Switzerland

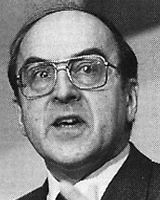
Kurt Furgler (1948), former president of Switzerland

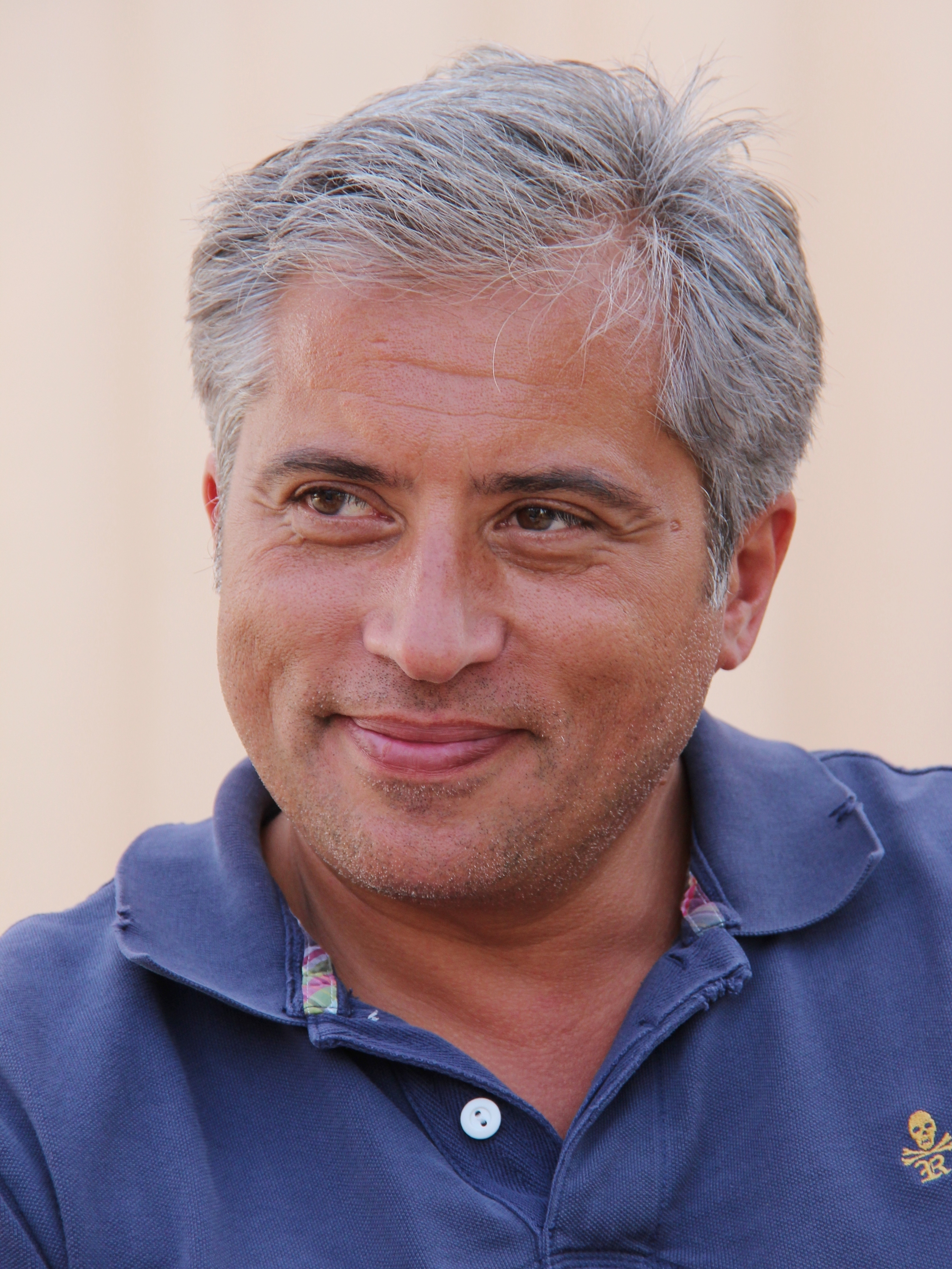
Jafar Hassan (PhD 2000), prime minister of Jordan

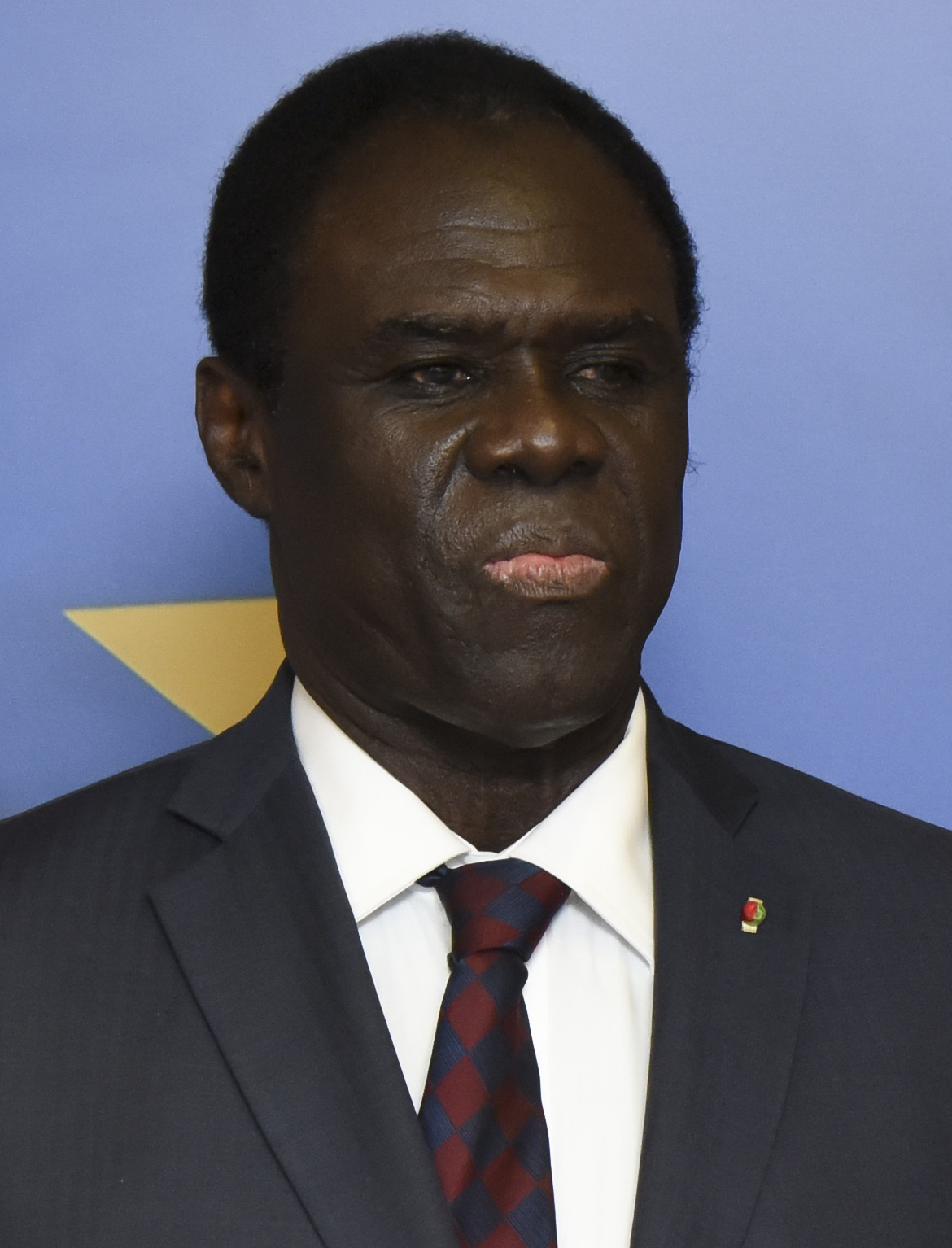
Michel Kafando (DEA 1972), former president of Burkina Faso

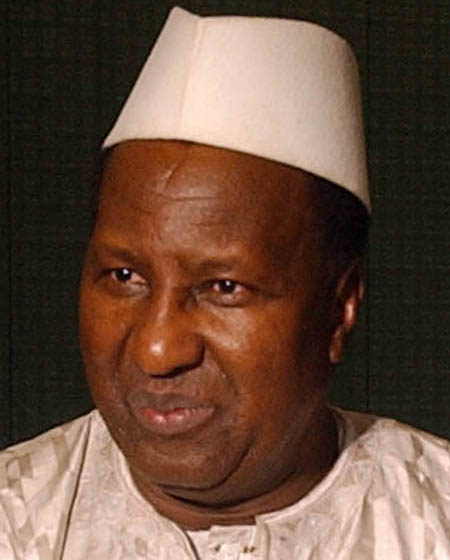
Alpha Oumar Konaré, former president of Mali and chairperson of the African Union Commission

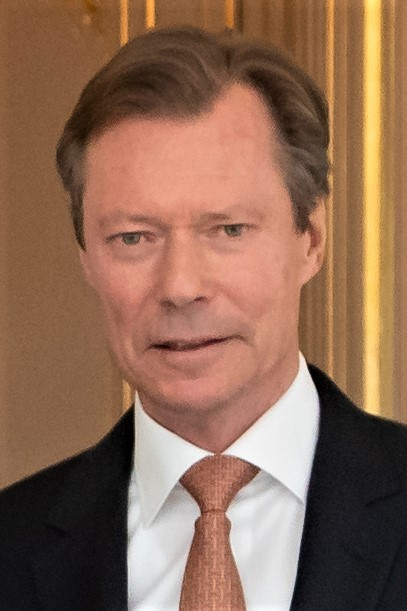
Henri, Grand Duke of Luxembourg (Licence 1980)

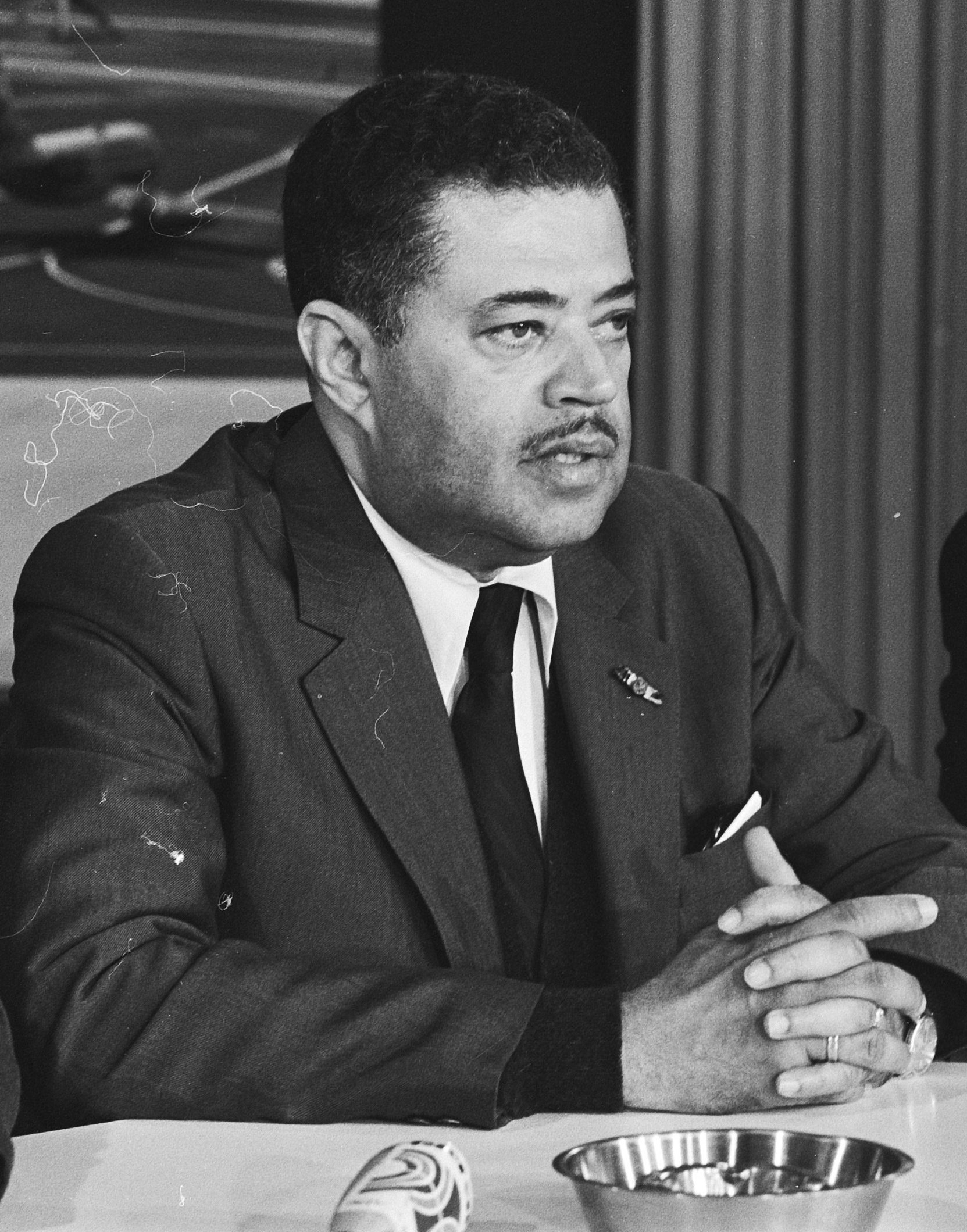
Boy Rozendal (PhD 1957), prime minister of the Netherlands Antilles

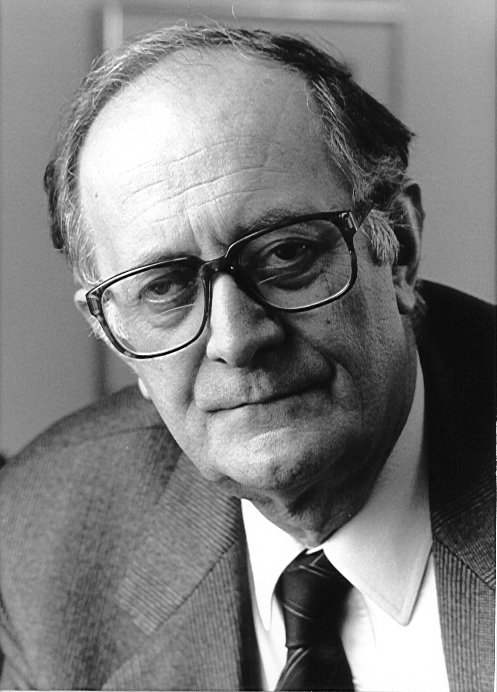
Cornelio Sommaruga (DEA 1961), former president of the International Committee of the Red Cross

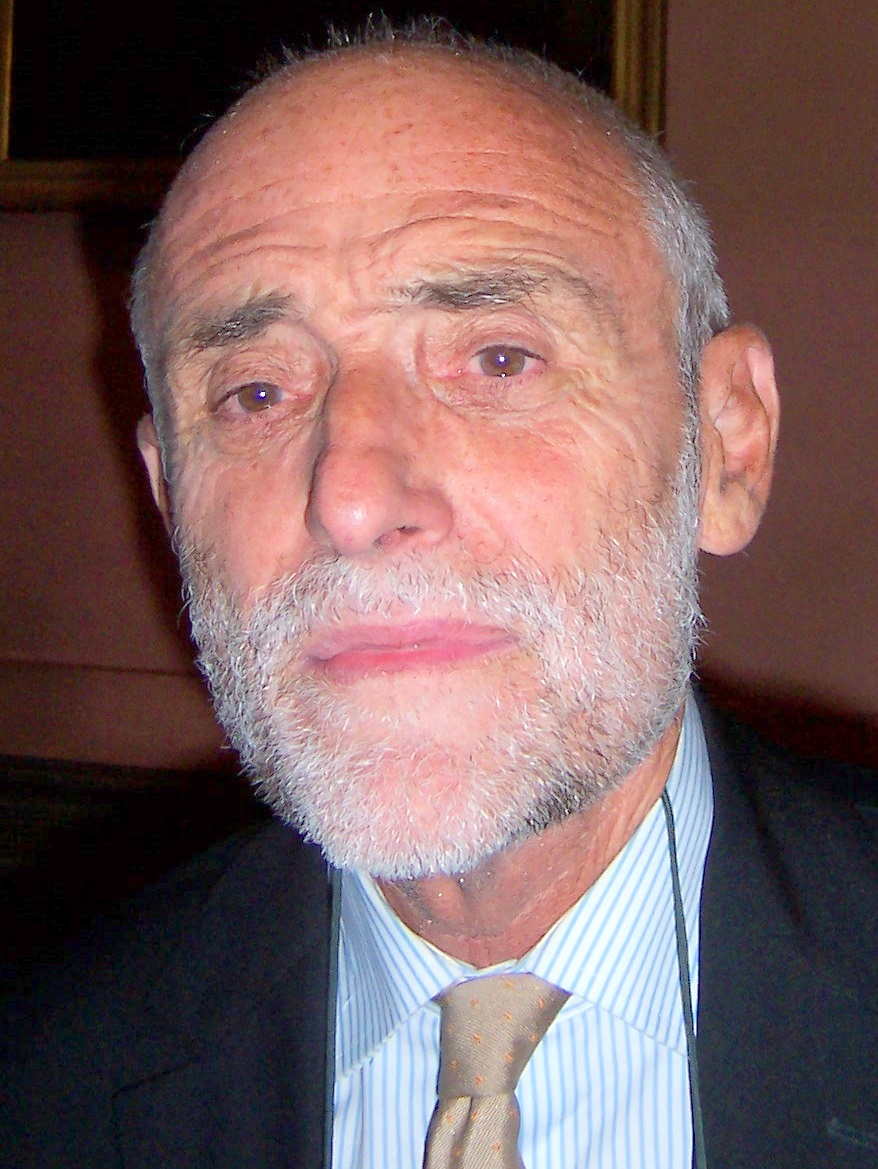
Jakob Kellenberger (1974–1975), president of the International Committee of the Red Cross

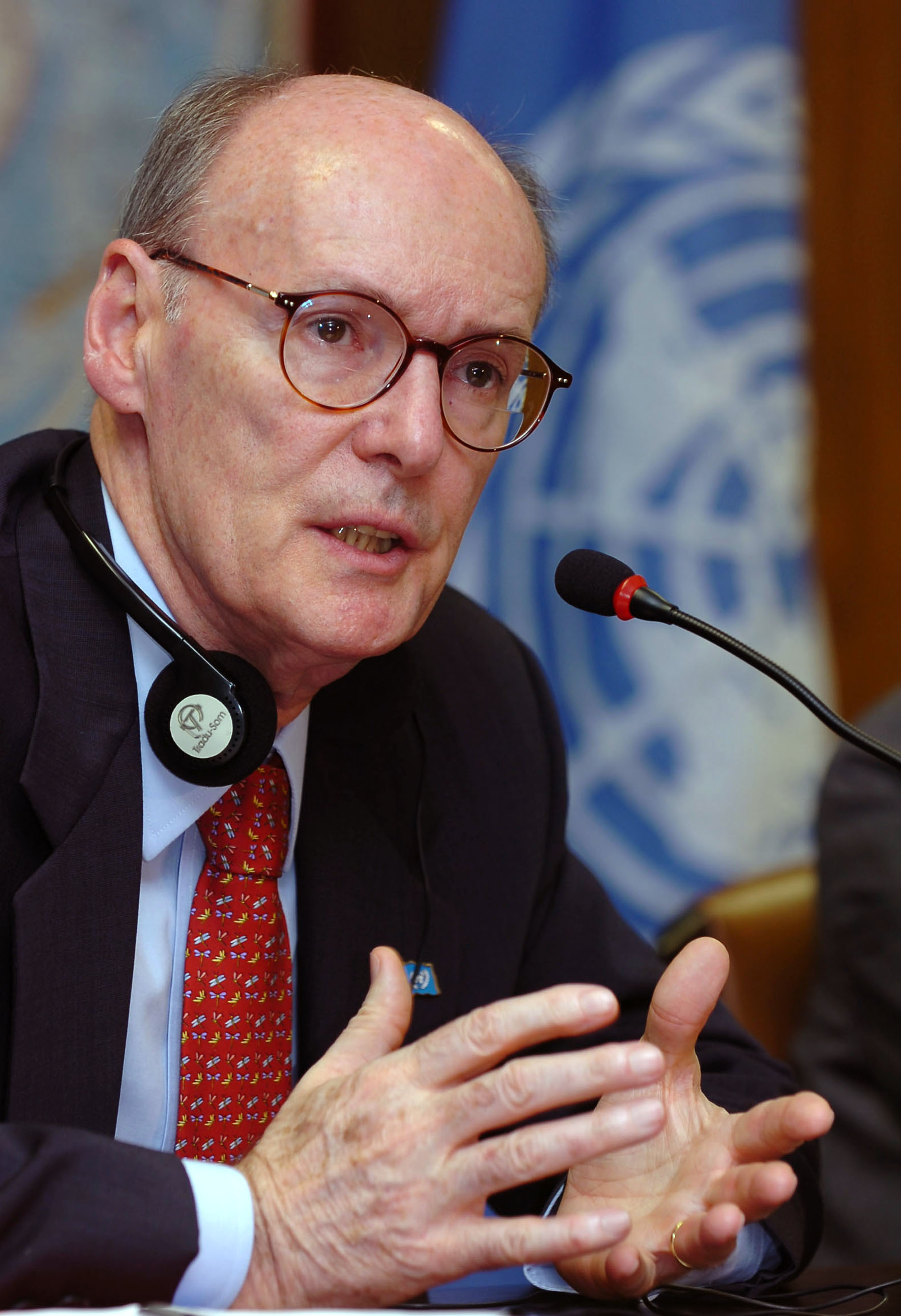
Hédi Annabi, former head of United Nations Stabilisation Mission in Haiti

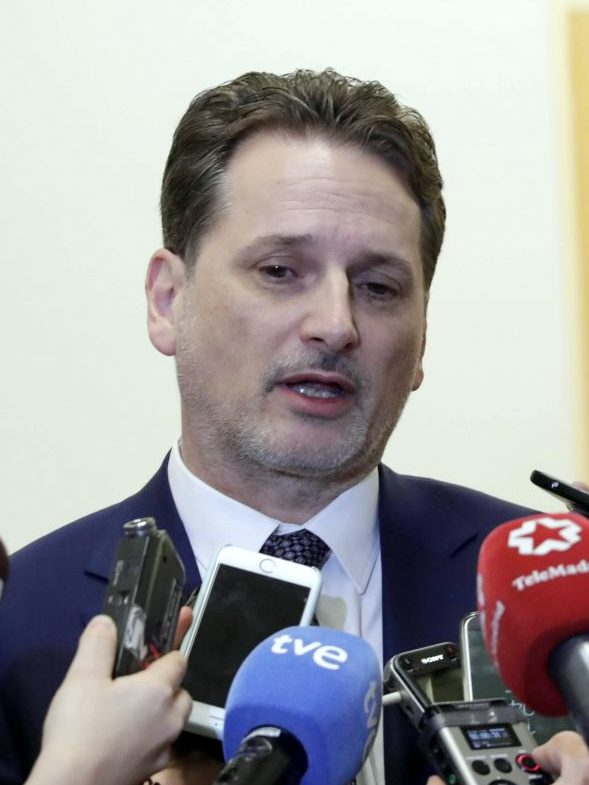
Pierre Krähenbühl (Licence 1991), Commissioner-General of the UNRWA

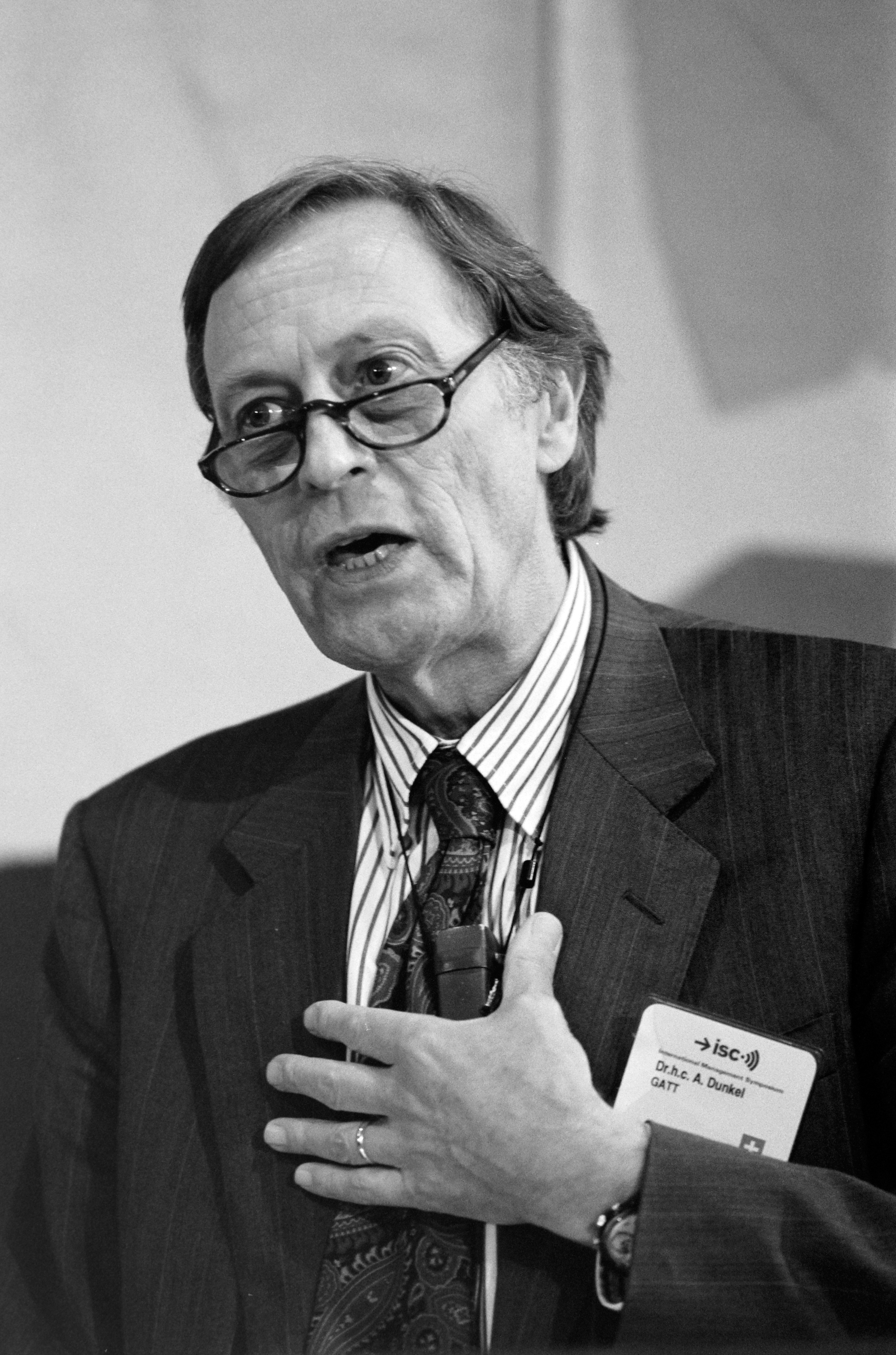
Arthur Dunkel, former director-general of General Agreement on Tariffs and Trade

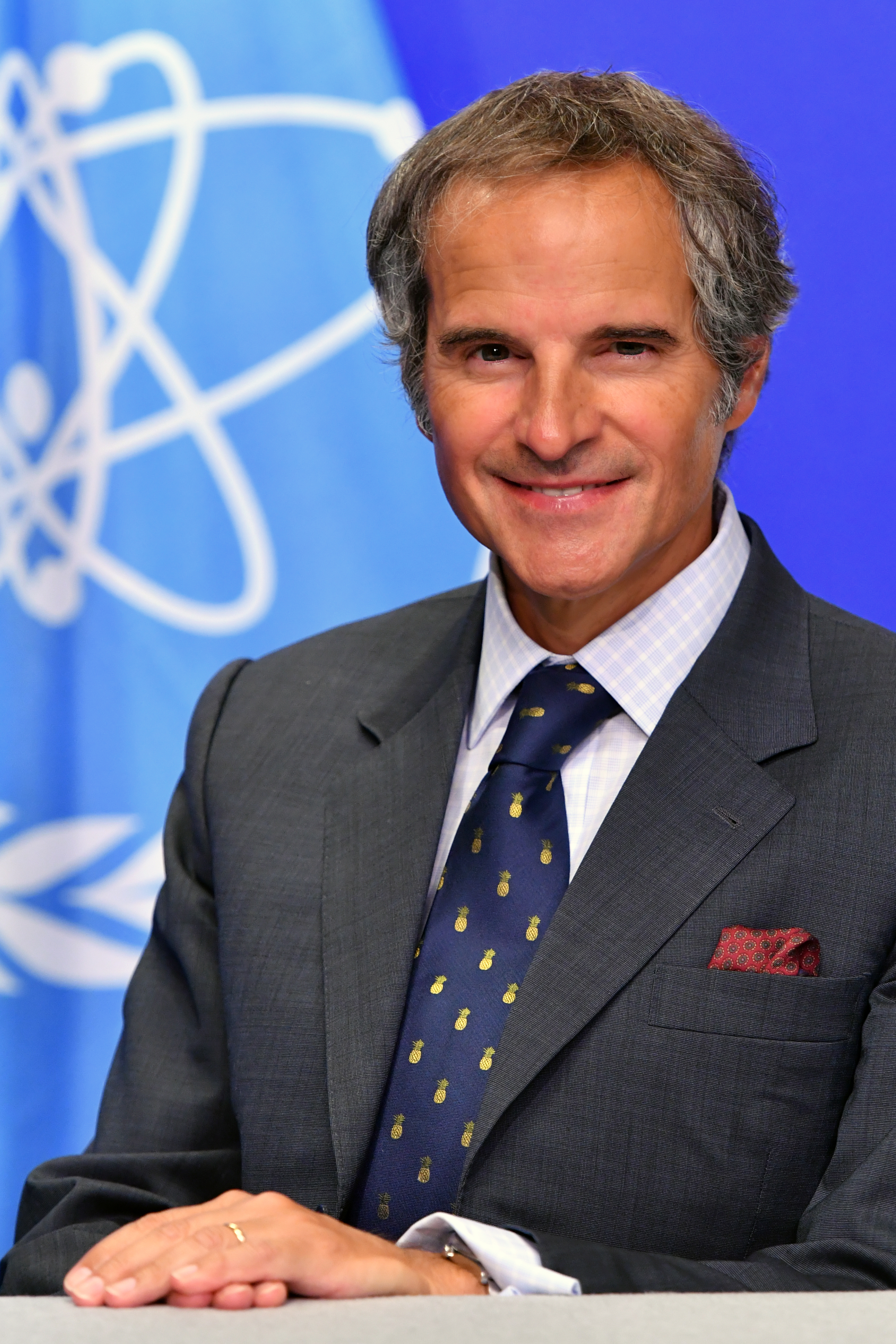
Rafael Grossi (PhD 1997), director-general of the International Atomic Energy Agency

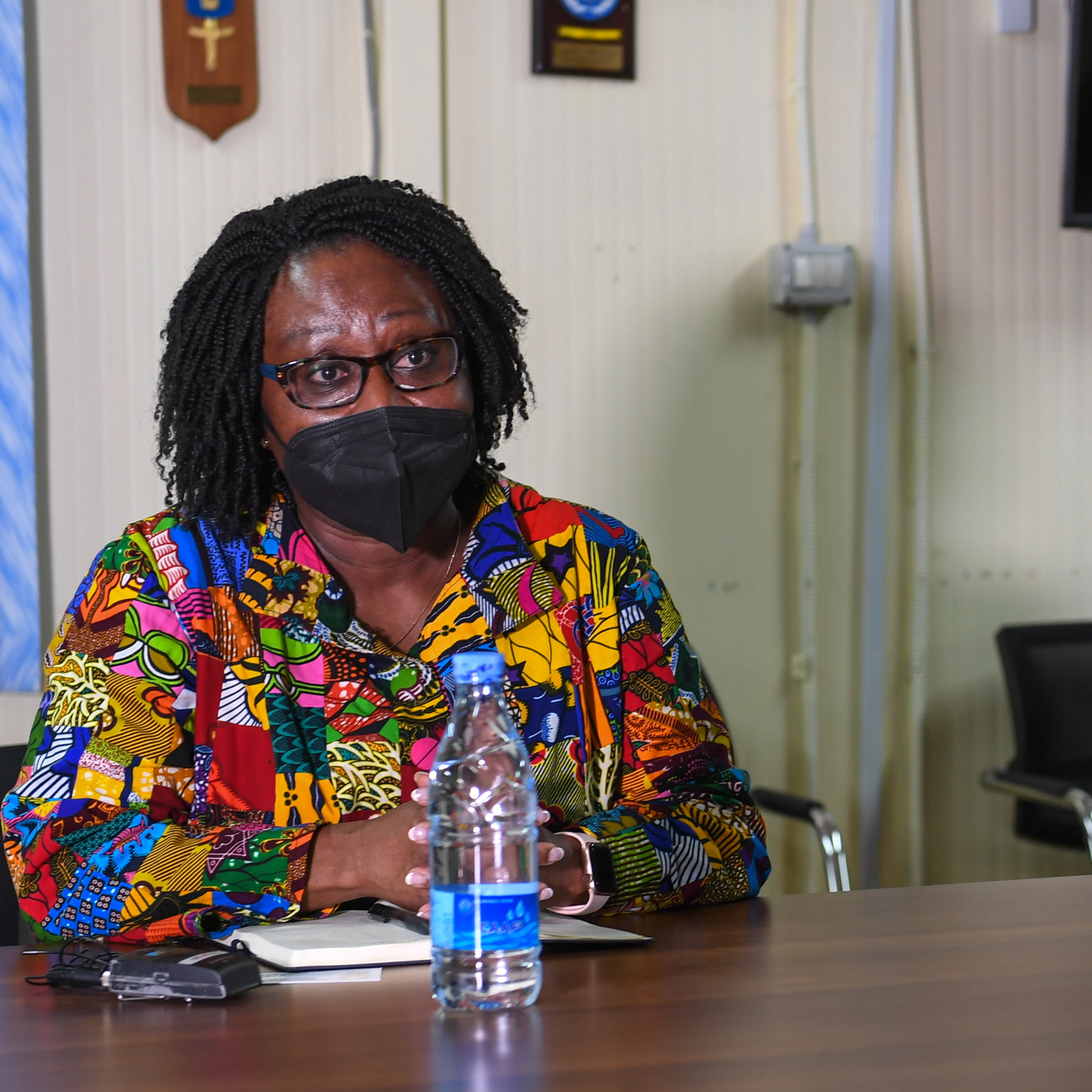
Martha Ama Akyaa Pobee, Assistant-Secretary-General of the United Nations

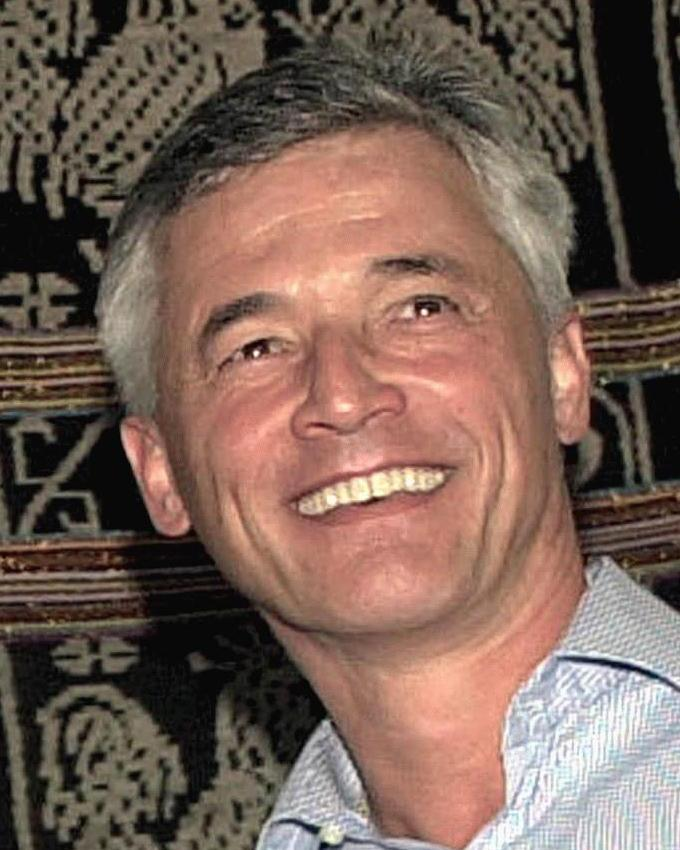
Sérgio Vieira de Mello, former United Nations High Commissioner for Human Rights

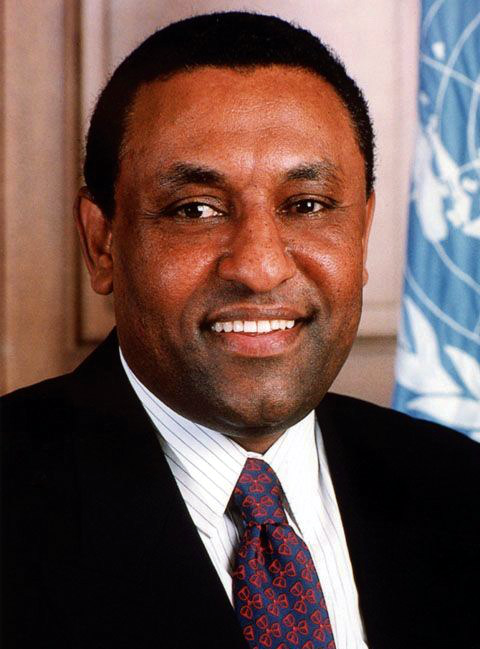
Kamil Idris (PhD 1984), prime minister of Sudan, former director-general of the World Intellectual Property Organization

=== Faculty ===
The Graduate Institute's former faculty members include Maurice Allais, Georges Abi-Saab, Richard Baldwin, Carl Jacob Burckhardt, José Manuel Barroso, Friedrich von Hayek, Saul Friedländer, Hans Kelsen, Robert Mundell, Gunnar Myrdal, René Cassin, Shalini Randeria, Kemal Dervis, Pierre-Marie Dupuy, Guglielmo Ferrero, Theodor Meron, Ludwig von Mises, Olivier Long, Wilhelm Röpke, Emmanuel Gaillard, Nicholas Georgescu-Roegen, Paul Guggenheim, Harry Gordon Johnson, Jacob Viner, and Jean Ziegler.

The Graduate Institute's current faculty members include William M. Adams, Liliana Andonova, Jean-Louis Arcand, Jean-François Bayart, Thomas J. Biersteker, Gilles Carbonnier, Vincent Chetail, Andrew Clapham, Rama Salla Dieng, Philip Gorski, Jacques Grinevald, Stefano Guzzini, Ilona Kickbusch, Marcelo Kohen, Nico Krisch, Keith Krause, Jussi Hanhimäki, Anna Leander, Giacomo Luciani, Alessandro Monsutti, Suerie Moon, Janne Nijman, Ugo Panizza, Joost Pauwelyn, Davide Rodogno, Gita Steiner-Khamsi, Timothy Swanson, Martina Viarengo, Jorge E. Viñuales, Beatrice Weder di Mauro, and Charles Wyplosz.

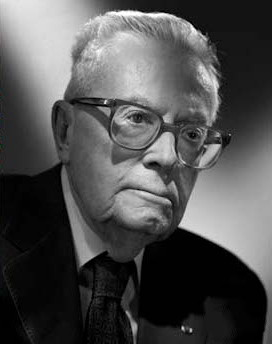
Maurice Allais, 1988 Nobel Memorial Prize in Economics recipient

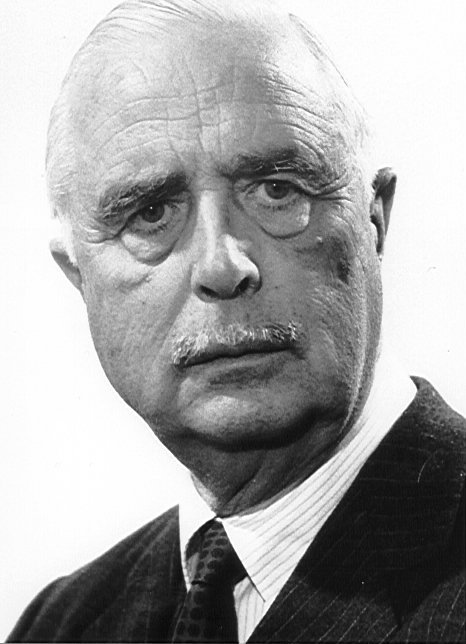
Carl Jacob Burckhardt, former president of International Committee of the Red Cross

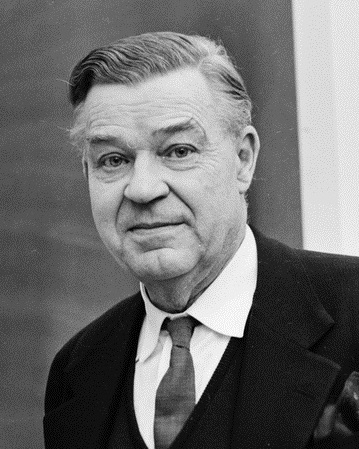
Gunnar Myrdal, 1974 Nobel Memorial Prize in Economics co-recipient

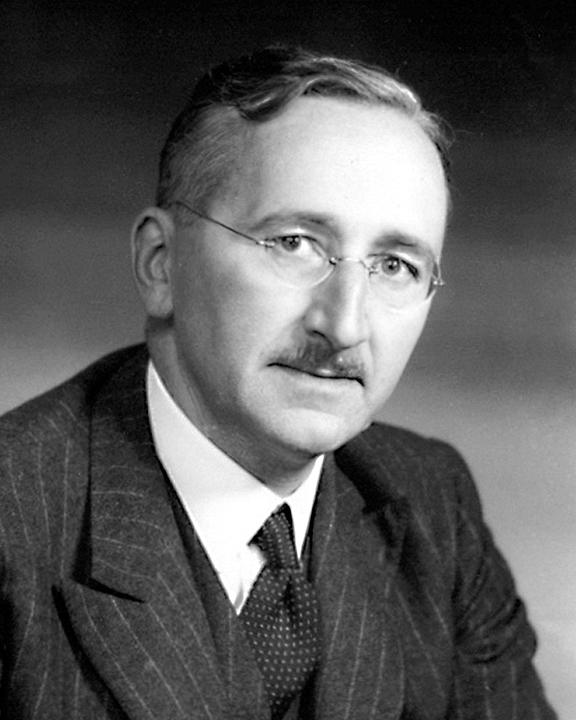
Friedrich von Hayek, 1974 Nobel Memorial Prize in Economics co-recipient

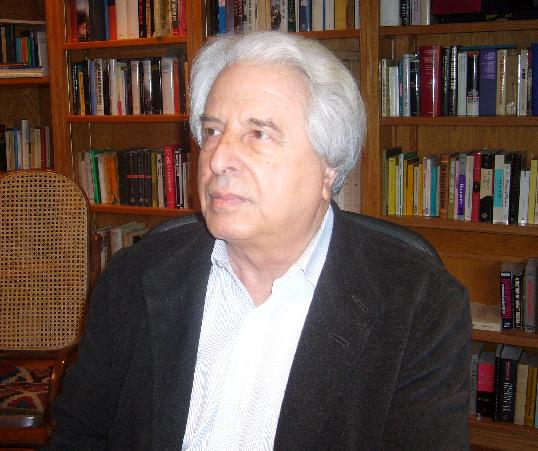
Saul Friedländer, 2008 Pulitzer Prize recipient

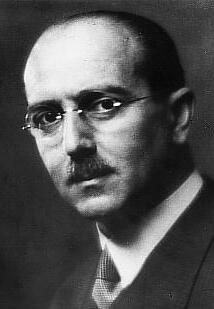
Hans Kelsen, jurist and legal philosopher

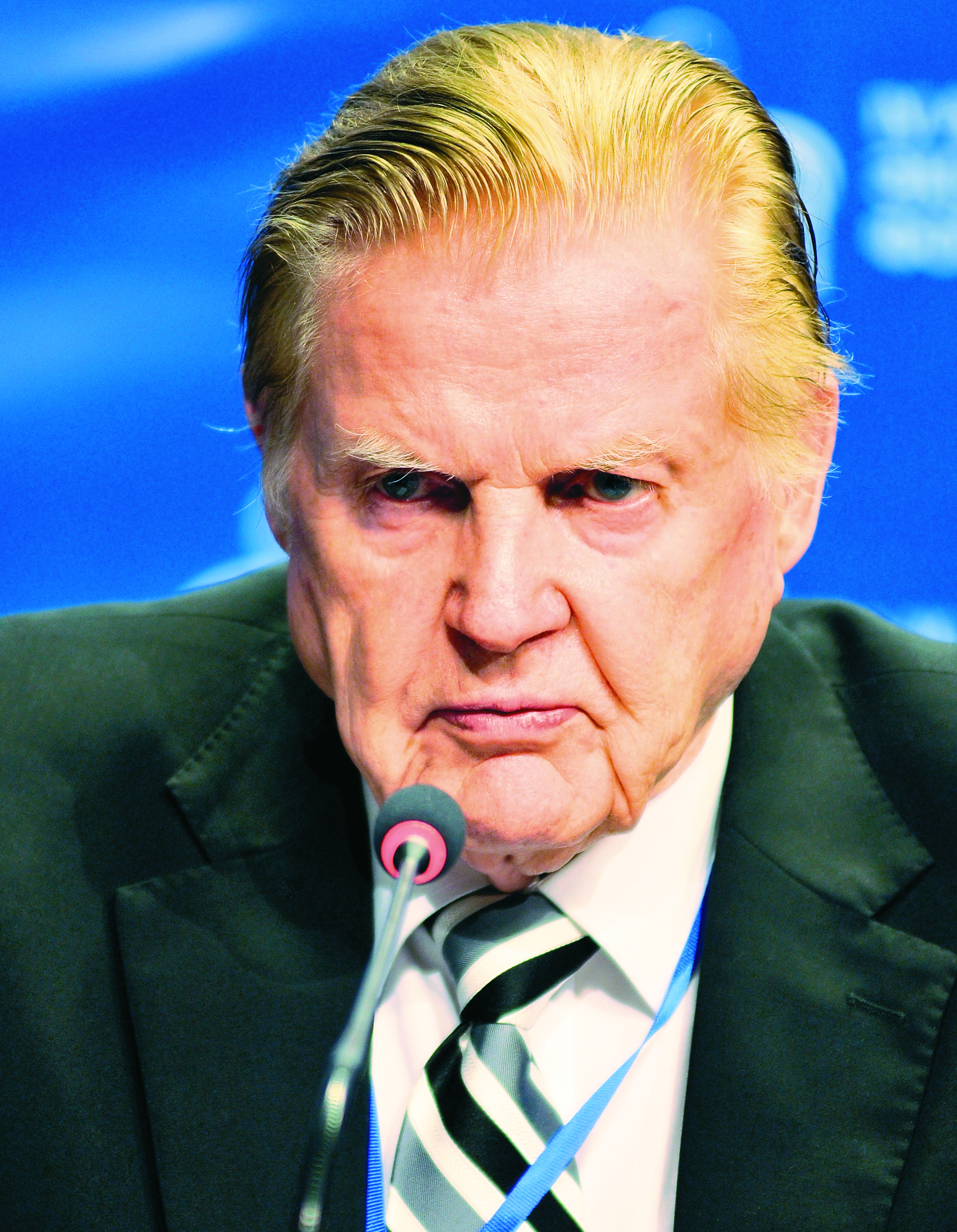
Robert Mundell, 1999 Nobel Memorial Prize in Economics recipient

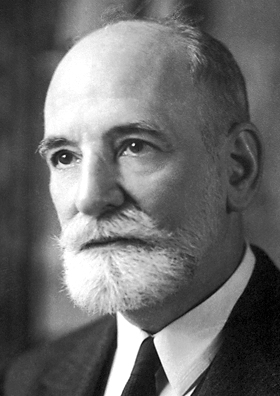
René Cassin, 1968 Nobel Peace Prize recipient

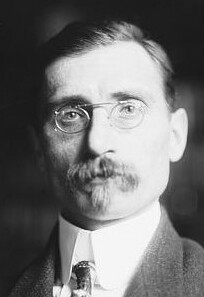
Guglielmo Ferrero, Italian historian

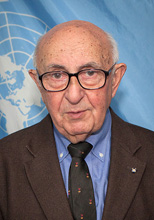
Theodor Meron, former president of International Criminal Tribunal for the former Yugoslavia

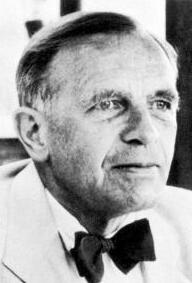
Wilhelm Röpke, father of social market economy

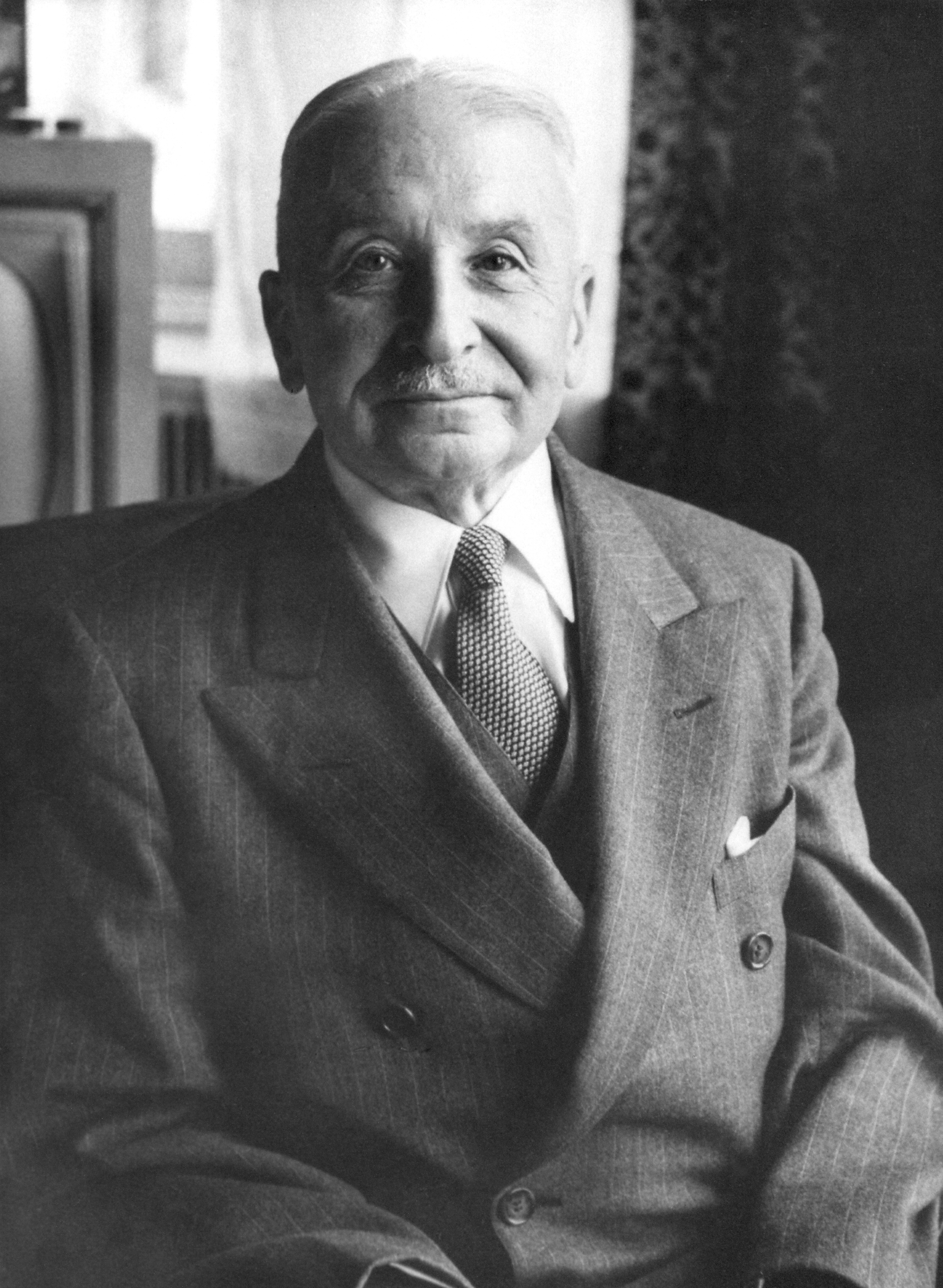
Ludwig von Mises, Austrian school economist and philosopher

== Bibliography ==
- The Graduate Institute of International Studies Geneva: 75 years of service towards peace through learning and research in the field of international relations, The Graduate Institute, 2002.
