= Rama Salla Dieng =

Senegalese political scientist and activist

Salla Dieng (also known as Rama Salla Dieng; born in 1986), is a Senegalese writer and professor of political science at the Geneva Graduate Institute, in Switzerland. She specializes in democratic governance, feminist movements, racial capitalism, and political economy in Senegal and Francophone Africa.

== Biography ==
Dieng studied at Montesquieu University in Bordeaux, France, where she earned a master's degree in political science. She subsequently obtained a dual master's degree from the same university and from the Institut d'études politiques de Bordeaux in international cooperation and risk management in developing countries. She also holds a PhD in development studies from the School of Oriental and African Studies.

Dieng worked at the African Institute for Economic Development and Planning in the field of policy research. She also worked for the United Nations Development Programme in Mauritius.

Dieng is associate professor at the Geneva Graduate Institute, in Switzerland. She previously served as a lecturer in international development and African studies at the University of Edinburgh, in Scotland, and also taught at the University of Cape Town.

She was awarded the 2025 Paula Kantor Award for excellence in field research by the International Center for Research on Women.

== Publications ==
- 2008 : La dernière lettre, Présence africaine. ISBN 9782708707870
- 2020 : Feminist Parenting: Perspectives from Africa and Beyond, éditrice scientifique avec Andrea O'Reilly, Demeter Press. ISBN 978-1-77258-228-4
- 2021 : Féminismes africains : une histoire décoloniale, Présence africaine. ISBN 9782708709751
