= Jacques Freymond =

Swiss political historian

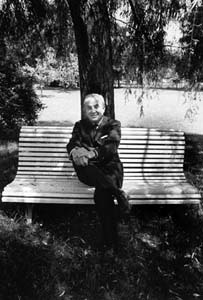

Jacques Freymond (5 August 1911 – 4 May 1998) was a Swiss political historian.

He was born in Lausanne, and studied in his hometown as well as in München, Sorbonne and Sciences Po.

He worked in the upper secondary school from 1935 to 1942. From 1943 to 1955 he was a professor in modern history at the University of Lausanne. He was also a writer in Gazette de Lausanne from 1946. In 1949–50 he was a guest scholar at Yale and Columbia. He spent his later career at the Graduate Institute of International Studies in Geneva. He chaired the International Political Science Association from 1964 to 1967.

Among his seminal works was the 800-page work La Première Internationale on the First International. This was co-published in 1962 together with Knut Langfeldt, Henri Burgelin and Miklós Molnár.

Freymond was a member of the International Committee of the Red Cross. He served as vice president from 1965 to 1971, and also acting president from February to June 1969.
