= Marie-Laure Salles =

French sociologist

Marie-Laure Salles-Djelic (born in 1965 in Villeneuve-sur-Lot) is a French sociologist of organizations, a university professor and a university administrator. She is director of the Geneva Graduate Institute and has been the dean of the School of Management and Innovation at Sciences Po Paris, which she launched in 2016.

== Background ==
Salles obtained a PhD in sociology from Harvard University in 1996. She was professor of business at the ESSEC Business School where she taught organization theory. In 2016, she became a professor at the Sciences Po Centre of Organisational Sociology. In 2019, she was nominated director of the Geneva Graduate Institute.

== Work ==
Salles' research interests range from the contemporary transformations of capitalism, the international diffusion of ideas and practices, corporate social responsibility and their political role, the deployment of globalization and the dynamics of regulation and governance in a globalized economic environment.

== Awards ==
In 2014, she was awarded an honorary doctorate from the Stockholm University. Salles was named Knight of the Legion of Honor in France in 2017. In 2000, the American Sociological Association awarded her the Max Weber Award for Distinguished Scholarship.

== Publications ==
Representative publications include:

- Exporting the American model: The post-war transformation of European business (Oxford: Oxford University Press, 1998)
- Transnational governance: Institutional dynamics of regulation, edited with Kerstin Sahlin-Andersson (Cambridge: Cambridge University Press, 2006)
- Transnational Communities: Shaping Global Economic. Governance, edited with Sigrid Quack (Cambridge: Cambridge University Press, 2012)
