= Debt intolerance =

Debt intolerance is a term referring to the inability of emerging markets to manage levels of external debt that, under the same circumstances, would be manageable for developed countries, making a direct analogy to lactose-intolerant individuals. It was coined by Carmen Reinhart, Kenneth Rogoff and Miguel Savastano.

== Debt intolerance hypothesis ==
The concept of debt intolerance alludes to the extreme duress many emerging market economies experience at their external debt levels, even when they would be controllable for the standard of advanced economies. For debt intolerant countries, sovereign riskiness appears to be out of proportion considering the size of their debt burdens, leading to extreme circumstances that most of the times translate into very high volatility and difficulty to repay their debt commitments.

This hypothesis is built on the empirical fact that debt crises in emerging economies tend to occur at levels of debt that may not be considered excessive. By analyzing debt levels and default decisions of middle income countries during the period 1970–2008 it is observed that, at the time of default, in only 16 percent of the cases the external debt-to-GNP ratio is higher than 100 percent; more than 50 percent of defaults occur at levels of external debt below 60 percent; and, 19 percent of the episodes happen at levels of debt below 40 percent of GNP

External debt at the time of default: 1970–2008
Range of ratios of external debt to GNP at the end of the first year of default or restructuring (%)	Percentage of total defaults or restructuring in middle-income countries
<40	19.4
41-60	32.3
61-80	16.1
81-100	16.1
>100	16.1
Source: Reinhart and Rogoff (2009)

== Characteristics of debt intolerant countries ==
The phenomenon of defaults occurring at relatively low levels of debt may be evidence that for some countries, particularly developing countries, the safe threshold of external debt-to-GNP is particularly low. Thus, in order to understand default decisions in these countries, it becomes essential to understand what the determinants of the safe threshold are.

The debt intolerance hypothesis highlights two key characteristics of debt intolerant countries defining the ‘safe’ threshold: the history of defaults and the levels of inflation.

=== Serial defaults and over-borrowing ===
Many countries that have defaulted on their history have done so repeatedly, with remarkable similarities and synchronization, coinciding in most cases with economic downturns. In general, debt intolerant countries do not achieve a substantial debt reduction through sustained growth or lower interest rates, but they require a major credit event, such as default or debt restructuring, to achieve it.

The number and spells of default episodes brings about an important issue in emerging markets of default becoming a "way of life". Evidence of this issue relies on the fact that, during the period 1824–2001, countries such as Brazil and Argentina were either on default or debt restructuring 26% of the time, Venezuela and Colombia 40% of the time and Mexico 50% of the time.

One feature of debt intolerant countries that are serial defaulters is their tendency to over-borrow. Making an analogy with lactose intolerance, this would be equivalent to lactose-intolerant individuals generating an addiction to milk. Over-borrowing behavior was an important feature of default episodes in the 1980s and 1990s, and was the result of shortsighted governments that, instead of seeking long-term goals, were just willing to take risks in order to temporally raise consumption, pushing them to contract excessive debt.

=== High inflation exposure ===
Historically, countries have developed ‘de facto’ default mechanisms through inflation or hyperinflation. Between 1824 and 2001, serial defaulters showed annual inflation levels exceeding 40% in 25% of the period, with countries like Brazil and Turkey reaching levels of 59% and 57.8%, respectively. In contrast, non-defaulter countries (such as India, Korea, Malaysia, Singapore, and Thailand) never experienced episodes of high inflation, which is only comparable to industrial economies with no external default history.

== Counter-arguments ==
The debt intolerance hypothesis proclaims that the size of debt is not necessarily tied to a country's debt vulnerability and it privileges the relevance of past events (history of defaults and inflation) over current outcomes. The hypothesis main drawback is that the link between past and current outcomes may be induced by variables omitted in the initial analysis.

Alternative explanations have attributed the intolerance to debt to a broader set of factors that could be grouped in three main categories: country's economic quality, country's political and institutional quality, and government's debt quality.

=== Political and institutional quality ===
From a broad point of view, serial defaults and a history of high inflation are just indicators of a larger set of institutional weaknesses characterizing debt crises in emerging economies, such as fragile fiscal structures, unreliable policies and vulnerable financial systems.

Persistent episodes of default have important economic repercussions on trade, investment flows and growth, but they also generate institutional erosion, immersing the economy in two well-defined vicious circles. On one hand, it erodes the financial system through the linkages between domestic and foreign financial markets. A weak financial system lowers the penalty to default, inducing countries to default at lower levels of debt. This, for instance, weakens even more the financial system generating new incentives to default. On the other hand, persistent episodes of default weaken the tax system by encouraging tax avoidance and capital flight, making it more difficult to meet debt obligations. This forces countries either to acquire additional debt if available or to move towards more inelastic tax sources, exacerbating tax avoidance and capital flights and thus falling in a feedback loop that makes it more and more difficult for the country to commit to repay its debt.

Institutional fragilities generate history dependence: past events have a decisive incidence on current outcomes because defaulter countries are more prone to experience future default episodes. In addition, unreliable policies may generate low levels of credibility from investors, leading to substantial risk premium.

=== Economic quality ===
Emerging economies, by being more exposed to shocks, tend to be more volatile than advanced economies. The higher volatility increases the risk premium required when borrowing in external markets to insure against risks.

The high volatility in domestic output and terms of trade appears as key devices determining the indebtedness capacity of emerging economies. More volatility would induce a higher default risk, restricting the borrowing capacity of countries even at low levels of indebtedness.

The exposure of these economies to persistent shocks may lead to multiple equilibria outcomes: a country that under a tranquil condition may have a perfectly sustainable policy stance may suddenly jump to an unsustainable situation just because the fear of default leads international investors to ask for larger risk premium. In other words, if the market regards a country's state to be "good", then large capital inflows can take place; if the market judges the country as being in a "bad" state, then rapid capital outflows and crisis can take place. In a "multiple" equilibrium environment, external shocks induce the economy to move from a "good" to a "bad" equilibrium.

=== Debt quality ===
The structure of debt and the existence of contingent liabilities may be more risky than the size of debt. Weaknesses associated to debt quality are mainly related to balance sheet characteristics, particularly the debt maturity structure, the currency in which the debt is denominated and the availability of equity-like buffers that may help cushion against shocks.

Maturity mismatches arise when there is a gap between the term structure of debt and the term structure and liquidity of the corresponding assets. In particular, if short-term debts exceed liquid assets then the economy will not be able to roll-over short-term debt and will be forced either to renegotiate it or to default.

Currency mismatches occur when the currency in which debts are denominated is different from the currency in which assets are denominated. In emerging economies, it is often the case that a high proportion of debt is denominated in foreign currency, making them vulnerable to a balance sheet mismatch where debt burdens increase without necessarily increasing in the ability to pay. The difficulty to denominate debt in terms of a currency more tractable to each country's repayment capacity is labeled as the original sin hypothesis, which appears as one of the possible explanations to why emerging countries have trouble handling debt levels that would be otherwise manageable for advanced economies.

Capital structure mismatches happen when a government relies more heavily on debt financing rather than on equity. While equity payments are contingent on the state of the economy and work as a buffer during bad times, debt payments remain unchanged in bad times bringing about financial distress when the economy encounters a shock.

== See also ==
- Original sin
- Sovereign default
- Default trap
