= State defaults in the United States =

US states defaulting on their debt

State defaults in the United States are instances of states within the United States defaulting on their debt. The last instance of such a default took place during the Great Depression, in 1933, when the state of Arkansas defaulted on its highway bonds, which had long-lasting consequences for the state. Current U.S. bankruptcy law, an area governed by federal law, does not allow a state to file for bankruptcy under the Bankruptcy Code. Certain politicians and scholars have argued that the law should be amended to allow states to file for bankruptcy.

== Law and policy surrounding state bankruptcy ==
=== Current law ===
U.S. bankruptcy law, an area governed by federal law, does not allow and has not historically allowed a state to file for bankruptcy under the Bankruptcy Code. Since 1937, Chapter 9 of the Bankruptcy Code has allowed ‘municipalities’ to declare bankruptcy. A municipality is a ‘political subdivision or public agency or instrumentality of a state,’ including cities, counties, townships, school districts, as well as revenue-producing bodies that provide services paid for by users rather than by general taxes, such as bridge authorities, highway authorities and gas authorities. But state governments themselves are not municipalities and cannot file for bankruptcy.

=== Proponents of allowing state bankruptcy ===
Certain scholars and politicians have advocated for a reform of the law to allow states to seek bankruptcy. They argue that the law will require voluntary consent by the state and will not give the federal government or creditors the power to force a bankruptcy; therefore it would not interfere with state sovereignty or be unconstitutional. The possibility of bankruptcy also encourages out-of-court bargaining by the various parties. One scholar has advocated for states to enact their own bankruptcy legislation for themselves, preferring it over federal legislation. The scholar argued that a state law restructuring process, which is more tailored to the state's unique circumstances, can be constitutional if it treats creditors fairly and allows state judges to supervise the process. A similar statute was upheld by the Supreme Court in 1942.

A local government, which is a subsidiary of a state, is already allowed to file for bankruptcy under Chapter 9 of the Bankruptcy Code, as long as they are not forbidden to do so by the state. In such municipal bankruptcies, the municipal government repudiate or modify contracts and debts. The federal judge overseeing the case can reject the proposed plan, but cannot force a tax hike or any other government function. The Supreme Court found the law to be constitutional in the 1938 case United States v. Bekins.

Proponents believe that for states with no reasonable prospect to satisfy their obligations, bankruptcies can provide a fresh start. Bankruptcy is a better solution than the two alternatives: (1) defaults, which are violations of debt obligations outside of the bankruptcy process, and (2) bailouts by the federal government. Public choice theory suggest that politicians are often incentivized or biased towards immediate borrowing and spending. Without the possibility of bankruptcy, a state can experience the debt overhang problem, where large existing debt burdens deter any additional lending to the state, driving out capital. The state's ability to tax and collect revenue is not unlimited; residents can simply move away if the tax is too high. Lenders are therefore reluctant to lend when they believe that the state will be unable to pay back its debt, thereby prohibiting valuable state projects that require borrowing funds.

The bankruptcy process gathers all debts and contract obligations of the entity and stops collections; it allows the debtor to modify its obligations, in a systematic plan that leads to longterm solvency, with the approval of a judge. In bankruptcy, state governments might seek relief from pension promises, interest payments on bonds, or contract debt owed to vendors and contractors. It also reduces the power of hold-outs by allowing a majority of creditors in each class to adjust the debt. The possibility of bankruptcy may tame the tendency of states to over-borrow or over-promise, and also gives states greater leverage when negotiating with creditors, employees or pensioners.

=== Opponents of allowing state bankruptcy ===
Others opined that it may be difficult for Congress to pass a law authorizing state bankruptcies. The fact that states aren't eligible for bankruptcy may allow them to borrow money at lower interest rates. Opponents, including representatives of the National Governors Association, say that talk of allowing states to seek bankruptcy protection could create doubts in the municipal bond market. A bankruptcy will make it more difficult and more expensive for a state government to obtain credit in the future, and may damage the morale of the government's civil service. Unions were concerned that the bankruptcy process would allow states, to terminate collective bargaining agreements and lower wages or pensions, like it does private sector employers.

Another problem of reforming the bankruptcy code to include states is the Contract Clause of the U.S. Constitution, which prohibits state governments from ‘impairing the obligation of contracts.’ As originally understood, this clause prohibited state legislatures from passing any laws to relieve either private debt or the state government's own debt.

Beginning in 1934, however, the Supreme Court began to allow some state debt relief laws. In the 1934 case of Home Building & Loan Ass'n v. Blaisdell, the Supreme Court allowed the temporary suspension of home foreclosures in the Great Depression. The Supreme Court in 1977 reiterated that "a state cannot refuse to meet its legitimate financial obligations simply because it would prefer to spend the money (on something else)", and held that the conditions were not sufficiently dire to justify the repeal of the covenants in question. Thus, if Congress were to "amend the federal bankruptcy code to authorize states to repudiate debt," there may be a conflict between Congress' power to enact bankruptcy laws in Article 1, Section 8, Clause 4 and the contracts clause of Article I, Section 10.

However, modern courts may allow modification of a state's own contracts if it is "reasonable and necessary to achieve an important public purpose." The Contract Clause and sometimes state constitutional provisions pledging the state's faith and credit on first glance forbid impairment of contracts. However, states are sovereign entities and they cannot transfer their police power (e.g. power to raise taxes) to creditors or other entities. Hence, both the Contract Clause and state constitutional provisions are weighed against the public interest behind the potential bankruptcy and the necessity and reasonableness of the legislation. Applying this balancing test under its state constitution, the New York Court of Appeals rejected New York City's attempt to impose a moratorium on its bonds, but did not give any enforcement rights to creditors.

== History ==
=== State defaults in the 1840s ===
In the 19th century, the prospect of state bankruptcies was real. After the Panic of 1837, eight states defaulted on canal and railway debt in the year 1841, including Pennsylvania's default in 1841.

=== State defaults in the 1860s ===
Many states defaulted on their obligations after the Civil War, as required by the Fourteenth Amendment.

== 1933 Arkansas default ==
The 1933 Arkansas default was the last default by a state in the United States. It was also the only default after the adoption of the 14th Amendment and the Jurisdiction and Removal Act of 1875, which drastically increased the power of federal courts over state matters.

=== Background ===
In the 1920s, Arkansas was trying to build more roads and develop infrastructure to accommodate the fast-expanding U.S. automobile industry. Initially, local road districts were established to borrow money and build roads, but the state took over after the 1920–1921 recession to try to develop a statewide network, unhappy with a financially troubled mishmash produced by the districts. The state took on $64 million of local road district debt ($878 million in 2015 dollars) and borrowed an additional $91 million to expand roads and bridges, unnerving the financial market. The state pledged the highway revenue, from gasoline taxes, license fees, and tolls, as security for the borrowing.

The Great Mississippi Flood of 1927 impacted a third of Arkansas. It destroyed infrastructure (including some of the roads previously built) and many cotton fields, a key product in the state. By the early 1930s, at the midst of the Great Depression, after the stock market crash and drought in the state, Arkansas had a catastrophic ratio of debt payments to income. The total debt was more than $160 million and the state's annual payments grew unsustainable. Some historians estimated that the state owed half its annual revenue to debt payments at the time.

=== Fallout, lawsuit and settlement ===
In 1933, debt-plagued Arkansas ran out of cash to pay the bonds. The state defaulted on the bonds, approximately $146 million in total, and sought to unilaterally modify their terms and extend maturities. The proposal would have created heavy losses for the bondholders. Bondholders, primarily Northern and Eastern banks and insurance companies holding bonds issued by the state, formed a group in New York and threatened lawsuits.

Arkansas Governor Junius Marion Futrell attempted to discourage bondholder lawsuits, claiming that the state was immune to such lawsuits as a sovereign entity. Yet creditors took advantage of two holes in this immunity argument. First, individuals cannot sue a state in federal court, but other states are able to do so. Second, a federal court can issue an injunction, preventing state officials from taking an action illegal under federal law or the Constitution. The Arkansas legislature was likely aware of this exposure, and thereby continued coupon payments to government creditors to prevent them from suing.

By paying only government creditors, Arkansas provided preferential treatment to a particular type of creditor at the expense of others with the same seniority. Bondholders took advantage of this vulnerability and sued the state treasurer in federal court. The restructuring plan, they argued, impaired the bonds, violated state promises, and thereby violated the Contract, Due Process, and Equal Protection Clauses of the US Constitution and the 14th Amendment. The federal court hearing the case agreed and granted state bondholders a temporary injunction against the use of highway revenues. This and other lawsuits had the potential to tie up the state's highway funds for an extended period. In a move that may be engineered by powerful financial creditors, the federal Public Works Administration (PWA) also suspended all its loans to the state until its bond-refunding issues were resolved, even though the PWA loan was not in jeopardy.

With the state at a weak negotiating position, in 1934, the state and its creditors reached a compromise refunding. The New York group creditors, who owned the state bonds, were almost made whole, while creditors of the districts (mostly Midwestern and Southern banks and insurance companies) lost a sizeable chunk. Unsecured creditors, like contractors, lost the most; they received half of their payment, with the other half to be paid in 25 years. The state imposed a 6.5 cent per gallon gasoline tax (around $1.16 per gallon in 2010 dollars). Arkansas schools were kept open only with the assistance of federal grants that constituted 19 percent of the state's total revenue that year.

The deal had to be modified in 1941, but the federal Reconstruction Finance Corporation (RFC, predecessor to the modern FDIC), in a surprising move, bought the new bonds. The RFC purchase saved Arkansas $28 million over the life of the bonds, although the RFC also still made $4 million in profit.

=== Consequences after the deal ===
After the 1933 default, despite a deal being reached between the state and creditors, Arkansas' financial reputation was tainted for decades. For years, infrastructure updates in Arkansas stalled as leaders became wary of borrowing and amended the rules to require more approvals for borrowings. In 1939, 43 percent of the state's own revenues were still dedicated solely to debt payment and road maintenance. The next highway bond issue would not be approved until 1949. Some scholars have credited the experience of the 1933 Arkansas default with the emphasis on balancing budgets among U.S. states.

== See also ==
- Sovereign default
- Debt crisis
