= Sovereign default =

When a sovereign entity fails to pay its debts

A sovereign default is the failure or refusal of the government of a sovereign state to pay back its debt in full when due. Cessation of due payments (or receivables) may either be accompanied by that government's formal declaration that it will not pay (or only partially pay) its debts (repudiation), or it may be unannounced. A credit rating agency will take into account in its gradings capital, interest, extraneous and procedural defaults, and failures to abide by the terms of bonds or other debt instruments.

Countries have at times escaped some of the real burden of their debt through inflation. This is not "default" in the usual sense because the debt is honored, albeit with currency of lesser real value. Sometimes governments devalue their currency. This can be done by printing more money to apply toward their own debts, or by ending or altering the convertibility of their currencies into precious metals or foreign currency at fixed rates. Harder to quantify than an interest or capital default, this often is defined as an extraneous or procedural default (breach) of terms of the contracts or other instruments.

If potential lenders or bond purchasers begin to suspect that a government may fail to pay back its debt, they may demand a high interest rate in compensation for the risk of default. A dramatic rise in the interest rate faced by a government due to fear that it will fail to honor its debt is sometimes called a sovereign debt crisis. Governments may be especially vulnerable to a sovereign debt crisis when they rely on financing through short-term bonds, since this creates a maturity mismatch between their short-term bond financing and the long-term asset value of their tax base.

They may also be vulnerable to a sovereign debt crisis due to currency mismatch: if few bonds in their own currency are accepted abroad, and so the country issues mainly foreign currency-denominated bonds, a decrease in the value of their own currency can make it prohibitively expensive to pay back those bonds (see original sin).

Since a sovereign government, by definition, controls its own affairs, it cannot be obliged to pay back its debt. Nonetheless, governments may face severe pressure from lending countries. In a few extreme cases, a major creditor nation, before the establishment of the UN Charter Article 2 (4) prohibiting use of force by states, made threats of war or waged war against a debtor nation for failing to pay back debt to seize assets to enforce its creditor's rights. For example, in 1882, the United Kingdom invaded Egypt. Other examples are the United States' "gunboat diplomacy" in Venezuela in the mid-1890s and the United States occupation of Haiti beginning in 1915. Today, a government that defaults may be widely excluded from further credit; some of its overseas assets may be seized; and it may face political pressure from its own domestic bondholders to pay back its debt. Therefore, governments rarely default on the entire value of their debt. Instead, they often enter into negotiations with their bondholders to agree on a delay (debt restructuring) or partial reduction of their debt (a 'haircut or write-off'). Some economists have argued that, in the case of acute insolvency crises, it can be advisable for regulators and supranational lenders to preemptively engineer the orderly restructuring of a nation's public debt – also called "orderly default" or "controlled default". In the case of Greece, economists generally believed that a delay in organising an orderly default would hurt the rest of Europe even more.

The International Monetary Fund often lends for sovereign debt restructuring. To ensure that funds will be available to pay the remaining part of the sovereign debt, it has made such loans conditional on action such as reducing corruption, imposing austerity measures such as reducing non-profitable public sector services, raising the tax take (revenue) or more rarely suggesting other forms of revenue raising such as nationalization of inept or corrupt but lucrative economic sectors. A recent example is the Greek bailout agreement of May 2010. After the 2008 financial crisis, to avoid a sovereign default, Spain and Portugal, among other countries, turned their trade and current account deficits into surpluses.

== Causes ==
According to financial historian Edward Chancellor, past instances of sovereign default have tended to occur under some or all of the following circumstances:

- A reversal of global capital flows
- Unwise lending
- Fraudulent lending
- Excessive foreign debts
- A poor credit history
- Unproductive lending
- Rollover risk
- Weak revenues
- Rising interest rates
- Terminal debt

A significant factor in sovereign default is the presence of significant debts owed to foreign investors such as banks who are unable to obtain timely payment via political support from governments, supranational courts or negotiation; the enforcement of creditors' rights against sovereign states is frequently difficult. Such willful defaults (the equivalent of strategic bankruptcy by a company or strategic default by a mortgager, except without the possibility of the exercise of normal creditors' rights such as asset seizure and sale) can be considered a variety of sovereign theft; this is similar to expropriation (including inadequate repayment for the exercise of eminent domain).

=== Insolvency/over-indebtedness of the state ===
If a state, for economic reasons, defaults on its treasury obligations, or is no longer able or willing to handle its debt, liabilities, or to pay the interest on this debt, it faces sovereign default. To declare insolvency, it is sufficient if the state is only able (or willing) to pay part of its due interest or to clear off only part of the debt.

Reasons for this include:

- massive increases in public debt
- declines in employment and therefore tax revenue
- government regulation or perceived threats of regulation of financial markets
- popular unrest at austerity measures to repay debt fully

Sovereign default caused by insolvency historically has always appeared at the end of long years or decades of budget emergency (overspending), in which the state has spent more money than it received. This budget balance/margin was covered through new indebtedness with national and foreign citizens, banks and states.

=== Illiquidity ===
There is an important distinction between illiquidity and insolvency. If a country is temporarily unable to meet pending interest or principle payments because it can not liquify sufficient assets, it is "in default because of illiquidity". In this concept the default can be solved as soon as the assets that are "only temporarily illiquid" become liquid (again), which makes illiquidity a temporary state – in contrast to insolvency. The weakness of this concept is that is practically impossible to prove that an asset is only temporarily illiquid.

=== Change of government ===
While normally the change of government does not change the responsibility of the state to handle treasury obligations created by earlier governments, nevertheless it can be observed that in revolutionary situations and after a regime change the new government may question the legitimacy of the earlier one, and thus default on those treasury obligations considered odious debt.

Important examples are:

- default of debts of the House of Bourbon after the French Revolution.
- default of bonds through Denmark in 1850, which were issued by the government of Holstein instated by the German Confederation.
- default of debts of the Russian Empire after the Soviet government came to power in 1917.
- repudiation of debts of the Confederate States of America by the United States after the Civil War through the ratification of Section 4 of the Fourteenth Amendment.

=== Demise of the state ===
With the demise of a state, its obligations are turned over to one or several successor states. For example, when the Soviet Union dissolved, successor states such as Estonia, Russia, Georgia, Ukraine, etc. came into being. The Soviet state ceased to exist, but its debt could be inherited by successor states.

Lost wars significantly accelerate sovereign default. Nevertheless, especially after World War II the government debt has increased significantly in many countries even during long lasting times of peace. While in the beginning debt was quite small, due to compound interest and continued overspending, it has increased substantially.

== Approaches to debt repayment ==
There are two different theories as to why sovereign countries repay their debt.

=== Reputation approach ===
The reputation approach stipulates that countries value the access to international capital markets because it allows them to smooth consumption in the face of volatile output and/or fluctuating investment opportunities. This approach assumes no outside factors such as legal or military action because the debtor is a sovereign country. Debtor countries with poor reputations will lack access to these capital markets.

=== Punishment approach ===
The punishment approach stipulates that the debtor will be punished in some form, whether it be by legal action and/or military force. The creditor will use legal and/or military threats to see their investment returned. The punishment may prevent debtors from being able to borrow in their own currency.

== Consequences ==
Creditors of the state as well the economy and the citizens of the state are affected by the sovereign default.

=== Consequences for creditors ===
The immediate cost to creditors is the loss of principal and interest owed on their loans to the defaulting country.

In this case very often there are international negotiations that end in a partial debt cancellation (London Agreement on German External Debts 1953) or debt restructuring (e.g. Brady Bonds in the 1980s). This kind of agreement assures the partial repayment when a renunciation / surrender of a big part of the debt is accepted by the creditor. In the case of the Argentine economic crisis (1999–2002) some creditors elected to accept the renunciation (loss, or "haircut") of up to 75% of the outstanding debts, while others ("holdouts") elected instead to await a change of government (2015) for offers of better compensation.

For the purpose of debts regulation debts can be distinguished by nationality of creditor (national or international), or by the currency of the debts (own currency or foreign currency) as well as whether the foreign creditors are private or state owned. States are frequently more willing to cancel debts owed to foreign private creditors, unless those creditors have means of retaliation against the state.

=== Consequences for the state ===
When a state defaults on a debt, the state disposes of (or ignores, depending on the viewpoint) its financial obligations/debts towards certain creditors. The immediate effect for the state is a reduction in its total debt and a reduction in payments on the interest of that debt. On the other hand, a default can damage the reputation of the state among creditors, which can restrict the ability of the state to obtain credit from the capital market. In some cases foreign lenders may attempt to undermine the monetary sovereignty of the debtor state or even declare war (see above).

=== Consequences for the citizens ===
If the individual citizen or corporate citizen is a creditor of the state (e.g. government bonds), then a default by the state can mean a devaluation of their monetary wealth.

In addition, the following scenarios can occur in a debtor state from a sovereign default:

- a banking crisis, as banks have to make write downs on credits given to the state.
- an economic crisis, as the interior demand will fall and investors withdraw their money
- a currency crisis as foreign investors avoid this national economy

Citizens of a debtor state might feel the impact indirectly through high unemployment and the decrease of state services and benefits. However, a monetarily sovereign state can take steps to minimize negative consequences, rebalance the economy and foster social/economic progress, for example Brazil's Plano Real.

== Examples of sovereign default ==
A failure of a nation to meet bond repayments has been seen on many occasions. Medieval England lived through multiple defaults on debt. Philip II of Spain defaulted on debt four times – in 1557, 1560, 1575 and 1596. This sovereign default threw the German banking houses into chaos and ended the reign of the Fuggers as Spanish financiers. Genoese bankers provided the unwieldy Habsburg system with fluid credit and a dependably regular income. In return the less dependable shipments of American silver were rapidly transferred from Seville to Genoa, to provide capital for further military ventures.

In the 1820s, several Latin American countries that had recently entered the bond market in London defaulted. These same countries frequently defaulted during the nineteenth century, but the situation was typically rapidly resolved with a renegotiation of loans, including the writing off of some debts.

A failure to meet payments became common again in the late 1920s and 1930s. As protectionism by wealthy nations rose and international trade fell, especially after the banking crisis of 1929, countries possessing debts denominated in other currencies found it increasingly difficult to meet terms agreed under more favourable economic conditions. For example, in 1932, Chile's scheduled repayments exceeded the nation's total exports; or, at least, its exports under then-current pricing. Whether reductions in prices – forced sales – would have enabled fulfilling creditors' rights is unknown.

A number of states in the U.S. defaulted in the mid-19th century. The most recent U.S. state to default was Arkansas, which defaulted in 1933.

More recently Greece became the first developed country to default to the International Monetary Fund. In June 2015 Greece defaulted on a $1.7 billion payment to the IMF.

== See also ==
- Asset–liability mismatch
- Balance of payments
- Debt crisis
- External debt
- Financial crisis
- Sovereign bond
- Vulture fund
