= Walk Away =

Walk Away or Walkaway may refer to:

== Places ==
- Walkaway, Western Australia, a town in Australia

== Arts and entertainment ==
=== Films and television ===
- Walkaway (film), a 2010 film

=== Literature ===
- Walkaway (Cory Doctorow novel), a 2017 sci-fi novel by Cory Doctorow
- The Walkaway, a 2002 novel by Scott Phillps

=== Music ===
- "Walk Away" (Christina Aguilera song), 2002
- "Walk Away" (Aloha from Hell song), 2008
- "Walk Away" / "Jailbreak", a 2005 single by Burden Brothers and Supersuckers
- "Walkaway" (song), a 1996 song by Cast from All Change
- "Walk Away" (Kelly Clarkson song), 2006
- "Walk Away" (Cool for August song), 1997
- "Walkaways", a 1996 song by Counting Crows from Recovering the Satellites
- "Walk Away" (Paula DeAnda song), 2006
- "Walk Away" (Five Finger Death Punch song), 2009
- "Walk Away" (Franz Ferdinand song)
- "Walk Away" (Funeral for a Friend song), 2005
- "Walk Away" (Tony Moran song), 2007
- "Walk Away" (Alanis Morissette song), 1991
- "Walk Away" (James Gang song), 1971
- "Walk Away" (Jasmine V song), 2014
- "Walk Away" (Donna Summer song), 1979
- "Walk Away", a song by Matt Monro, 1964, English version of "Warum nur, warum?"
- "Walk Away", a song by Bad Religion from Against the Grain (1990)
- "Walk Away (From a Good Thing)", a song by the Bicycles from Oh No, It's Love (2008)
- "Walk Away", a song by Black Sabbath from Heaven and Hell (1980)
- "Walk Away", a song by Black Veil Brides from Black Veil Brides (2014)
- "Walk Away", a song by Michael Bolton from The Hunger (1987)
- "Walk Away", a song by The Box
- "Walk Away", a song by Burden Brothers from Queen O' Spades (2002)
- "Walk Away", a song by Cheap Trick from Busted (1990)
- "Walk Away", a song by Dokken from Beast from the East (1988)
- "Walk Away", a song by Dropkick Murphys from Blackout (2003)
- "Walk Away (Maybe)", a song by Good Charlotte from The Chronicles of Life and Death (2004)
- "Walk Away", a song by Green Day from ¡Tre! (2012)
- "Walk Away", a song by Ben Harper from Welcome to the Cruel World (1994)
- "Walk Away", a song by Indigo Girls from Strange Fire (1987)
- "Walk Away", a song by Martina McBride from Shine (2009)
- "Walk Away", a song by The Nadas, used on Pinks
- "Walk Away", a song by Nelly from M.O. (2013)
- "Walk Away", a song by Pink from Try This (2003)
- "Walkaway", a song by Pseudo Echo from Autumnal Park (1984)
- "Walk Away", a song by the Script from Science & Faith (2010)
- "Walk Away", a song by September from Love CPR (2011)
- "Walk Away", a song by Sevendust from Chapter VII: Hope & Sorrow (2008)
- "Walk Away", a song by Shane Fenton and the Fentones
- "Walk Away", a song by Del Shannon from Rock On! (1991)
- "Walk Away", a song by the Sisters of Mercy from First and Last and Always (1985)
- "Walk Away", a song by Westlife from World of Our Own (2001)
- "Walk Away", a song from High School Musical 3: Senior Year (2008)
- "Walk Away", a song by Zebrahead from Waste of Mind (1998)

== Others ==
- Bank walkaway, a decision by a mortgage lender to not foreclose on a defaulted mortgage
- Walkaway, a mortgage loan borrower who carries out a strategic default
- WalkAway campaign, also styled #WalkAway, a social media campaign by conservative activist Brandon Straka
