= Debt overhang =

Debt so large that even positive investments go to debtholders

Debt overhang is the condition of an organization (for example, a business, government, or family) that has existing debt so great that it cannot easily borrow more money, even when that new borrowing is actually a good investment that would more than pay for itself.

This problem emerges, for example, if a company has a new investment project with positive net present value (NPV), but cannot capture the investment opportunity due to an existing debt position, i.e., the face value of the existing debt is bigger than the expected payoff. Hence, the equity holders will be reluctant to invest in such a project because most of the benefits will be reaped by the debt holders. In addition, debt holders will not finance the firm if the company cannot convince the debt holders that the project will not fail.

The situation emerges if existing debtholders of a company can be expected to lay claim to (part of) the profits of the new project, and this renders the NPV of the project (when undertaken by this company) negative.

== Overview ==
The result of having excessive debt is that any earnings generated by new investment projects are partially appropriated by existing debt holders. A firm facing debt overhang cannot issue new junior debt because default is likely. Moreover, more debt will make the problems of debt overhang worse not better. In addition, the firm's shareholders do not want to issue new stock because this forces shareholders to bear some of the losses that would have been borne by junior creditors. Thus, the firm refuses to fund projects with a positive NPV. This problem was first discussed by Myers (1977).

Debt overhang can affect firms or banks that have excessive amounts of debt, but are solvent, in the sense that the value of their assets exceeds the value of their liabilities. Debt overhang also prevents firms that are insolvent, with assets worth less than their liabilities from recovering from their troubles. Bankruptcy which takes the form of Chapter 11 reorganization or receivership, for banks, can cure the problems of debt overhang for insolvent institutions. Successful bankruptcy reorganizations allow organizations to reduce their debt levels and allow new private shareholders to bear enough of the gains from new investments that they will pursue new projects that have positive expected net present value.

The concept of debt overhang has been applied to sovereign governments, predominantly in developing countries (Krugman, 1988). It describes a situation where the debt of a country exceeds its future capacity to pay it. Debt overhang in developing countries was the motivation for the successful Jubilee 2000 campaign.

== Debt overhang and the 2008 financial crisis ==
The problem of debt overhang was used as a justification by governments to inject capital into banks around the world after the collapse of Lehman Brothers in September 2008 and the subsequent falls in stock markets worldwide. Nevertheless, many governments in the 2008 financial crisis, including the United States, primarily bought newly issued preferred stock. Preferred stock is similar to debt in that it gets paid before common stock; it also pays regular dividends that are similar to interest. Thus, the capital infusions of Troubled Assets Relief Program's Capital Purchase Program (TARP CPP) in the United States may have done little to cure debt overhang problems in the United States' largest banks. Academic research suggests that if the government bought common stock or toxic assets in troubled banks that the debt overhang problem would be better corrected. Nevertheless, if a bank is very insolvent, subsidies will have to be extremely large to correct the problems of debt overhang and unsecured debt and preferred stock holders may have to bear some losses. Interviews with many bank executives found that many banks were not eager to increase lending after receiving TARP funds. The Congressional Review Panel, created to oversee the TARP, concluded on January 9, 2009, that, "Although half the money has not yet been received by the banks, hundreds of billions of dollars have been injected into the marketplace with no demonstrable effects on lending."

== Structural macroeconomic debt overhang ==
This occurs if there is a latent output gap or underemployment in an economy, which is bridged repeatedly by credit creation, the buildup of which results in a debt overhang. Conversely, you may deduce from a long term tendency to build up debt the existence of latent structural underemployment. Typically private lenders (banks) boldly venture forth: whether they lend to developing countries like in the 1970s, covered by the expected stream of high future coupons, or excessive consumption of their own folk covered by higher paper valuations of assets, it is the same basic story. In the eventual shakeout (due yet again, in the last instance, to latent underemployment), the debt overhang is preserved by substituting public debt for private debt (bailouts), and—keeps growing.

== See also ==
- Balance sheet recession
- Capital structure
- Corporate finance
- Credit creation
- Debt-trap diplomacy
- Default logic
- Default trap
- Economic colonialism
- Poverty trap
- Terminal debt
