= Walking Away =

Walking Away may refer to:

- "Walkin' Away" (Clint Black song)
- "Walking Away" (Craig David song), 2000
- "Walkin' Away" (Diamond Rio song)
- "Walking Away" (Information Society song), 1988
- "Walking Away" (Justin Bieber song), 2025
- "Walking Away" (K.One song), 2010
- "Walking Away", a song by The Egg
  - "Love Don't Let Me Go (Walking Away)", a mash-up of the song with David Guetta's "Love Don't Let Me Go"
- Walking Away, a poem by Cecil Day-Lewis, 1962
- Walking Away (Harper and Row, 1973), a children's book by Elizabeth Winthrop and illustrated by Noelle Massena
- "Walkin' Away", by Kix from Midnite Dynamite
- "Walking Away", by Lifehouse from Lifehouse
- "Walking Away", by Limp Bizkit from Gold Cobra

== See also ==
- Walk Away (disambiguation)
