= Chapter 9, Title 11, United States Code =

Chapter of the United States Bankruptcy Code

Chapter 9, Title 11, United States Code is a chapter of the United States Bankruptcy Code, available exclusively to municipalities and assisting them in the restructuring of their debt.

The term 'municipality' denotes "a political subdivision or public agency or instrumentality of a State," but does not include a state itself. States are therefore unable to file for bankruptcy even though they have defaulted in their obligations.

On July 18, 2013, Detroit, Michigan became the largest city in the history of the United States to file for Chapter 9 bankruptcy protection. Jefferson County, Alabama, in 2011, and Orange County, California, in 1994, are also notable examples.

== History ==
Recent Chapter 9 filing counts
Year	Filings
2012	20
2013	9
2014	12
2015	4
2016	8
2017	7
2018	4
2019	6
2020	4
2021	4
2022	3

The first municipal bankruptcy legislation was enacted in 1934 during the Great Depression. Although Congress attempted to draft the legislation so as not to interfere with the sovereign powers of the states guaranteed by the Tenth Amendment to the Constitution, the Supreme Court held the 1934 Act unconstitutional as an improper interference with the sovereignty of the states. Congress enacted a revised Municipal Bankruptcy Act in 1937, which was upheld by the Supreme Court. The law has been amended several times since 1937.

From 1937 to 2008 there were fewer than 600 municipal bankruptcies. As of June 2012, the total was around 640. In 2012 there were twenty chapter 9 bankruptcies in the United States, and nine petitions have been filed in 2013. Since 2010, 81 petitions have been filed.

Previous to the creation of Chapter 9 bankruptcy, the only remedy when a municipality was unable to pay its creditors was for the creditors to pursue an action of mandamus, and compel the municipality to raise taxes. During the Great Depression, this approach proved impossible, so in 1934, the Bankruptcy Act was amended to extend to municipalities. The 1934 Amendment was declared unconstitutional in Ashton v. Cameron County Water Improvement District No. 1.

However, a revised act remedying the constitutional deficiencies was passed again by Congress in 1937 and codified as Chapter X of the Bankruptcy Act (later redesignated as Chapter IX). This revised act was upheld as constitutional by the Supreme Court in United States v. Bekins.

Chapter 9 was largely unchanged until it was amended in 1976 in response to New York City's financial crisis. The changes made in 1976 were adopted nearly identically in the modern 1978 Bankruptcy Code as Chapter 9.

In 1988, Chapter 9 was amended by Congress to provide statutory protection from § 552(a) lien stripping provisions to revenue bonds issued by municipalities. This was addressed with the classification of these bonds as "special revenues" under the newly minted § 928(a) and § 922(d) exemption of special revenues from the automatic stay provisions of § 362.

To prevent overlap with Chapter 11, § 101(41) of the U.S. Bankruptcy Code (11 U.S.C. § 101(41)) defines the term "person" to exclude many "governmental units" as defined in § 101(27), and "municipality" as defined in § 101(40).

== Features of Chapter 9 ==
While in many ways similar to other forms of bankruptcy reorganization (esp. Chapter 11), Chapter 9 has a number of unique characteristics. Because municipalities are entities of State governments, the power of the bankruptcy court is limited to some extent by the Tenth Amendment to the United States Constitution.

=== Collective bargaining ===
Municipalities' ability to re-write collective bargaining agreements is much greater than in a corporate Chapter 11 bankruptcy and can trump state labor protections, allowing cities to renegotiate unsustainable pension or other benefits packages negotiated in flush times.

=== Authorization for filing of municipal bankruptcies ===
Section 109(c) of the U.S. Bankruptcy Code provides that a municipality may be a debtor in a Chapter 9 bankruptcy case only if the municipality is specifically authorized to be a debtor by State law, or by a governmental officer or organization empowered by State law to authorize the municipality to be a debtor. In 23 states, Chapter 9 authorization laws are either unclear or otherwise prohibited for municipalities. Three states (Colorado, Illinois, and Oregon) grant a very limited authorization to file for bankruptcy. Illinois, for example, only grants Chapter 9 authorization to the Illinois Power Agency.

A total of 12 states authorize Chapter 9 upon conditions met and further action of state, officials or other entity; and the remainder (12) specifically authorize bankruptcy.

=== Inclusion of states in Chapter 9 ===
Neither Chapter 9 nor any other part of U.S. bankruptcy law allows a state to file for bankruptcy, although states have defaulted on their obligations. The last U.S. state default took place in 1933, when Arkansas defaulted on its bonds.

Certain politicians and scholars have argued that the law should be amended to allow states to file for bankruptcy. Proponents say that an orderly bankruptcy is a better solution than the two alternatives: (1) defaults, which are violations of debt obligations outside of the bankruptcy process), and (2) bailouts by the federal government. Opponents, including representatives of the National Governors Association, say that amending the law to allow states to seek bankruptcy protection could create doubts in the municipal bond market.

== Notable Chapter 9 bankruptcies ==
=== Prior to 2011 ===
Municipality	Type	Year	Population	Value	Description	Status	Sources
San Jose Unified School District	School District	1983				Completed	
Washington Public Power Supply System	Electric district	1983		$2,250,000,000	The agency over-invested in nuclear power, attempting to building five such plants at one time, while new conservation measures reduced demand	Completed	
Copperhill, Tennessee	City	1988	360			Completed	
Hamilton Creek Metropolitan District (Summit County, CO)	Municipal corporation	1989		$2,000,000	The District was unable to pay back bonds intended to fund a housing project	Completed	
Richmond Unified School District	School District	1991			After the District filed its petition, the state loaned the District funds to bridge its budget gap, and also appointed an administrator to take over management of the District. The administrator requested that the bankruptcy court dismiss the petition, and this was granted.	Withdrawn by municipality	
Bridgeport, Connecticut	City	1991	141,600		In 1991, the petition for relief filed by the city of Bridgeport, Connecticut, was denied. The case was dismissed because the bankruptcy court concluded that Bridgeport, although financially distressed, was not insolvent within the meaning of the eligibility criteria of Chapter 9.	Denied by courts	
Lipscomb, Alabama	City	1991	2,800			Completed	
North Bonneville, Washington	City	1991	400			Completed	
North Courtland, Alabama	City	1992	970			Completed	
Orange County, California	County	1994	2,500,000	$1,700,000,000	County treasurer Robert Citron made risky investments, leading to the county's bankruptcy	Completed	
Kinlock, Missouri	City	1994	2,700			Completed	
Pritchard, Alabama	City	1999	28,600		Due to inability to pay pensions. The city would again declare bankruptcy in 2009.	Completed	
Desert Hot Springs, California	City	2001	16,500	$6,000,000	The city lost a housing discrimination lawsuit	Completed	
West Jefferson Amusement and Public Park Authority	Parks District	2002			The agency was unable to pay the construction bonds for Visionland amusement park.	Completed	
Millport, Alabama	City	2005	1,100	$3,500,000	The city lost tax revenue after a factory closed	Completed	
Los Osos Community Services District	Sewer District	2006	16,500		This sewer district in Los Osos, California was unable to pay debt for a wastewater facility	Completed	
West Contra Costa Healthcare District, San Pablo, California	Hospital District	2006		$50,000,000		Completed	
Moffett, Oklahoma	City	2007	120		The state revoked the town's ability to issue traffic tickets as it had operated as a speed trap.	Completed	
Valley Health Systems District, Hemet and Sun City, California	Hospital District	2007		$100,000,000		Completed	
Gould, Arkansas	City	2008	830		The town spent money that should have been withheld to pay employee income taxes.	Completed	
Vallejo, California	City	2008	115,900		The city was unable to meet pension obligations.	Completed	
Pierce County Housing Authority, Pierce County, Washington	Housing District	2008			The housing authority was unable to pay mold-related lawsuits	Completed	
Westfall Township, Pennsylvania	Township	2009	2,300		The city lost a lawsuit.	Completed	
Prichard, Alabama	City	2009	22,600		The city was unable to pay pensions. The city has already declared bankruptcy for the same reason in 1999.	Completed	
Sarpy County Sanitation Improvement District, Sarpy County, Nebraska	Sewer District	2009			The sewer district faced decreased housing development and less revenue as a result.	Completed	
New York City Off-Track Betting Corporation	Gambling District	2009			After being unable to pay its debts due to mismanagement, the public corporation was dissolved in 2010	Completed	
Connector 2000 Association, Greenville County, South Carolina	Road District	2010			The road district operated the Southern Connector, a portion of Interstate 185, and went bankrupt after toll collections were less than expected.	Completed	
Hamtramck, Michigan	City	2010	22,400		In 2010, the city of Hamtramck, Michigan requested permission from the Governor under Michigan's authorizing law to file a petition for Chapter 9 Bankruptcy, but was denied. Instead of bankruptcy, the treasury advised that Hamtramck be offered a selection of loan options.	Denied by courts	
Washington Park, Illinois	City	2010	4,200		In December 2010, Washington Park briefly emerged from bankruptcy and then filed a new petition for bankruptcy which was rejected by the judge, who stated there was no Illinois state law enabling a municipality to file a Chapter 9 bankruptcy petition.	Denied by courts	
Las Vegas Monorail Company, Las Vegas	Private company	2010			The monorail company was ruled to be a private company and not a municipality, so it does not qualify for Chapter 9 bankruptcy.	Denied by courts	

=== 2011–present ===
Municipality	Type	Year	Population	Value	Description	Status	Sources
Central Falls, Rhode Island	City	2011	19,300		The city was unable to pay its obligations and petitioned to be put into receivership in 2010, as Rhode Island does not generally permit Chapter 9 filings. The state appointed receiver or overseer assumed all financial responsibilities from the mayor. Rhode Island's receivership law was rewritten to allow the receiver the ability to file a petition for Chapter 9 federal bankruptcy and Central Falls has done that.	Completed	
Jefferson County, Alabama	County	2011	658,400	$4,000,000,000	Over $4 billion in debt (largest Chapter 9 bankruptcy until 2013 Detroit bankruptcy filing,) from sewer revenue bonds tainted by an interest rate swap bribery scandal with JPMorgan and county commissioner Larry Langford, and bond insurance credit rating collapse in the late-2000s subprime mortgage crisis, followed by the occupation tax being declared unlawful in Alabama. (see Jefferson County, Alabama: Sewer construction and bond swap controversy)	Completed	
Boise County, Idaho	County	2011	7,000		The County lost a judgement for violating the Fair Housing Act. The bankruptcy petition was dismissed by the judge after concluding the municipality had “sufficient surplus moneys” to satisfy the judgment and continue operations.	Denied by courts	
Harrisburg, Pennsylvania	City	2011	49,000		The city was approximately $400 million in debt, due in part to a failed trash incinerator. The bankruptcy judge dismissed the bankruptcy petition on the grounds that not all necessary branches of the municipal government had authorized the filing of the petition.	Denied by courts	
Stockton, California	City	2012	291,700			Completed	
San Bernardino, California	City	2012	209,900	$1,000,000,000		Completed	
Mendocino Coast Healthcare District	Hospital District	2012				Completed	
Mammoth Lakes, California	City	2012	8,200		The city lost a $43 million lawsuit, but its bankruptcy case was voluntarily dismissed after Mammoth Lakes reached a settlement.	Withdrawn by municipality	
Detroit, Michigan	City	2013	700,000	$18,000,000,000	The City of Detroit had been in decline for a long time, due to the closure of auto factories, white flight, and other factors, leading it unable to pay its obligations	Completed, under investigation	
Hardeman County Memorial Hospital, Quanah, Texas	Hospital District	2013				Completed	
Hillview, Kentucky	City	2015	9,000			Completed	
Fairfield, Alabama	City	2020	10,000				
Chester, Pennsylvania	City	2022	32,535				
Cle Elum, Washington	City	2025	2,157	$26,000,000	The city was sentenced to pay $22.2 million in damages and costs to a real estate developer in 2024 after violating an agreement for the development of a planned community. Unable to pay the debt, the city opted to file for bankruptcy on June 24, 2025.		
Palo Verde Healthcare District	Hospital District	2025					

Note: Population refers to the population served at the time of the bankruptcy and may not be the same as its current population. Dollar values are as reported at the time and do not reflect current value.

=== Notable defaults that did not result in Chapter 9 bankruptcy ===
- Cleveland, Ohio, 1978, dispute with city creditors over sale of a utility.

== See also ==
- Community Act 47, Financially Distressed Municipalities Act, Commonwealth of Pennsylvania.
- Super Chapter 9
