= U.S. state defaults in the 1840s =

State defaults in the 1840s (in the United States) were defaults by U.S. states that took place in Arkansas, Illinois, Indiana, Louisiana, Maryland, Michigan, Mississippi, Pennsylvania, and Florida. The end of an inflationary period from 1834 to 1839 and the Panic of 1837 led to a tightening of credit lending from the Bank of England. By 1841, nineteen of the twenty-six U.S. states and two of the three territories had issued bonds and incurred state debt. Of these, the aforementioned states and territory were forced to default on payments. Four states ultimately repudiated all or part of their debts, and three went through substantial renegotiations.

It is important to distinguish state defaults and bankruptcies. A default is a breach of obligations under a debt contract, which a sovereign is entitled to do, especially before the passage of the 14th Amendment. The 1933 Arkansas Default, after the 14th Amendment was passed, would prove much more difficult for the state, because of the increased power of federal court over states. By contrast, a bankruptcy is a legal process, under federal law, to systematically sort out debt obligations under the supervision of a judge. There are no provisions in U.S. bankruptcy law that authorizes a state to declare bankruptcy.

The states were borrowing to fund transportation investments as well as raising capital to start new banks. Northern states, such as Pennsylvania and Maryland (considered a southern state at the time), incurred debt through the building of canals to connect the Midwest to ports on the Atlantic Ocean. Midwest states, including Ohio, Indiana, Illinois, and Michigan, built railroads and canals throughout the region, while Southern States raised capital to fund new banks to improve a weakened banking system. The majority of state debt was owed to parties outside the U.S., primarily Europe. State debts were largely paid off in full by the late 1840s, although no direct sanctions were enacted to force repayment. The state defaults inspired the enactment of the Bankruptcy Act of 1841, although the Act did not apply to the states themselves, and was soon repealed in 1843.

== Inflationary Period Pre-1837 ==
The years from 1834 to 1837 leading up to the State defaults were inflationary until the Panic of 1837. Prices for cotton and other exports sent overseas were rising. Through trade and state-backed bonds, the United States had a strong inflow of capital from the Bank of England and other European parties. Large infrastructure investments were being made domestically with the excess inflow of monetary value to the U.S. Much of the westward expansion of the United States was brought about from overseas funding for railroads and canals. Increasing the efficiency of transportation made it easier for people to move away from the large ports on the East coast.

=== Northern states ===
Pennsylvania and Maryland had viewed the success of the Erie Canal in connecting rural New York and the Midwest to the ports on the Atlantic Ocean. The investment in building a new canal was costly but well compensated in trade opportunities further down the road. Both Pennsylvania and Maryland began borrowing from European groups to fund the construction of similar transportation infrastructure. By 1841, Maryland had amassed a total debt of a little over $12 million with more than $11 million used for transportation purposes. Pennsylvania had a lower proportion of transportation to other uses debt ratio compared to Maryland but had a total debt that was nearly three times that of Maryland's. Transportation investment debt reached over $30 million ($1.1 billion in 2025 dollars) in Pennsylvania by 1841.

=== Midwest states ===
The Midwest states were also borrowing to increase transportation infrastructure, similar to the Northern States, but railroads were the prime mode of transportation in the Midwest in this period. Canals were also being established at this time. Nearly all of the Mid-western state debts were incurred for transportation uses. The Midwest states borrowed on a much smaller scale than Pennsylvania and Maryland, reaching about $37 million, total, between Illinois, Indiana, Michigan, and Ohio.

=== Southern states ===
The Southern states were much different in the means of borrowing compared to the rest of the nation. At the time, the Southern banking system was small and insignificant compared to that in the North. United States bonds were issued to both foreign and domestic parties to raise capital. The raised capital was used to fund new banks and to allow already established banks the capital to grow upon.

== Causes of collapse and defaults ==
In 1836, the Bank of England decided to tighten the loaning of credit both domestically and to foreign parties to help increase dwindling reserves of monetary value held in the banks. Due to an open free trade economy domestic banks were forced to follow the interest rate changes made in England in fear of falling behind in competition. Demand for cotton plummeted, by early 1837 the price of cotton was down 25%. Much of the nation, especially the South, was heavily dependent on trade of agriculture. Unstable crop prices had devastating effects in the South at the time. Overall the tightening of credit had a widespread devastating effect in the United States because the infrastructure investment projects, brought about by large inflows of capital from Europe, were left unfinished and without further funding.

== Effects ==
The tightening of credit from European parties led to many unfinished and unfunded infrastructure investment projects in the United States. Canals in Pennsylvania and Maryland were unfinished along with many railroads in the Midwest. Southern banks soon failed and bonds were unable to be paid back in full across the country.

=== Northern states ===
Both Pennsylvania and Maryland borrowed heavily from European sources to fund canals connecting their ports to the Midwest and both could not make the interest payments early in the 1840s, due to the Panic of 1837, and had to declare defaults. Both states were well populated and relatively wealthy for the time so after a few tries they were able to raise their taxes to a point sustainable and were able to continue payment on loans relatively quickly.

=== Midwest states ===
The Midwest states including Ohio, Illinois, Indiana, and Michigan borrowed funds to build transportation infrastructure in the form of railroads and canals. With the tightening of funding from foreign sources most investment opportunities collapsed and only Ohio was able to avoid defaulting on loans. Indiana and Illinois were able to reach agreements with lenders to continue funding of the projects if payments were still met along with some speculations. Illinois deeded the Illinois and Michigan canal to their creditors as payment and Indiana agreed to pay half the debts while the Wabash and Erie canals were held in trust to pay the rest. Michigan followed similar procedures as Illinois and Indiana but agreements forced them to only pay a fraction of the total debts.

=== Southern states ===
Most Southern states felt similar effects causing defaults in 1841. The many banks that had been established as a means of expanding Southern banking failed at an alarmingly high rate. Courts ruled that the states were not responsible for bonds issued to banks but were responsible for any bonds issued directly by the states. Many banks had large sums of debt and no way to pay for it. Quite often bonds issued and backed by banks were done outside of regulation standards giving banks a means to repudiate their debts. Debt repayment or repudiation was split among the states. Some states such as Louisiana and Arkansas liquidated the banks to pay off debts while states like Mississippi and Florida refused to pay their debts in full.

== See also ==
- State defaults in the United States
- Sovereign default
- Debt crisis
