= You Walk Away =

YouWalkAway.com
- Industry: foreclosure consulting
- Founded: 2007; 19 years ago
- Headquarters: San Diego, California
- Key people: Jon Maddux and Chad Ruyle (Co-Founders)
- Website: www.youwalkaway.com

YouWalkAway.com, also known as You Walk Away, was a company that helped homeowners facing foreclosure through strategic default. YouWalkAway was based in San Diego, California.

Jonathan Maddux and Chad Ruyle formed YouWalkAway.com in 2007. The company's goal was to help homeowners navigate through a foreclosure while understanding their options and rights. For a fee, the company provided tools, resources, legal and tax help, and support.

YouWalkAway.com developed a strategic default calculator to help homeowners calculate the savings they might have by getting out of an underwater mortgage. In 2012, YouWalkAway.com launched AfterForeclosure.com to help people discover if they were eligible to buy again after a foreclosure or a short sale.
