= Domestic liability dollarization =

Denomination of banking system deposits

Domestic liability dollarization (DLD) pertains to the denomination of banking system deposits and loaning in a currency other than that of the country in which they are held. DLD does not refer exclusively to denomination in US dollars, as DLD encompasses accounts denominated in internationally traded "hard" currencies such as the British pound sterling, the Swiss franc, the Japanese yen, and the euro (and some of its predecessors, particularly the Deutschmark).

== Measurement ==
In developed countries, DLD is defined as Bank for International Settlements reporting banks' local asset positions in foreign currency as a share of GDP. In emerging-market economies (EMs), a proxy measure of DLD is constructed by summing dollar deposits and bank foreign borrowing as a share of GDP. This proxy is based on the assumption that banks match their assets and liabilities by currency type and transfer exchange rate risk to debtors. In other settings, DLD is defined as the share of foreign currency deposits over total deposits.

== Determinants ==
A variety of causes have been proposed for DLD, some more widely accepted than others. Causes often cited in the early literature on DLD, especially in Latin America, include high fiscal deficits, loose monetary policy and a history of inflation. In an economic environment characterized by these features, the domestic currency (often generically referred to as the peso) serves neither as a reliable medium of exchange nor a predictable store of value. The modern approach to DLD, however, emphasizes that DLD, as typically measured based on interest rate-bearing deposit dollarization, is largely a portfolio choice phenomenon related less with inflation levels than with the distribution of inflation (more precisely, of real return differentials), and relates the outcome to the volatility of inflation and the real exchange rate (and, in turn, the exchange rate policy). Despite the strong intuitive appeal of this idea, there is comparatively little empirical work on this issue. Among the work that has been done, however, Berkmen and Cavallo (2007) do not find evidence that more active intervention in foreign exchange markets (i.e., more fixing) leads to higher liability dollarization.

Others have argued that a closely managed exchange rate is an effect rather than a cause of DLD, a claim empirically supported in Berkmen and Cavallo (2007). It has additionally been proposed that DLD reflects a lack of faith in the domestic currency and ultimately in the quality of government, and that countries whose governments rank higher on various indices of quality experience lower levels of DLD than their more poorly performing counterparts.

== Implications ==
Researchers have attributed a variety of both positive and negative effects to DLD. The benefits are largely found at the household and firm levels in the short to medium term. These benefits include insurance against inflation and currency devaluation, as well as permitting long-term lending and borrowing through the use of a relatively stable currency.

In contrast, the real or potential costs of DLD exist largely at the systemic level and over the long term. When DLD is widespread, economic actors are often required to experience a currency mismatch between domestically denominated income and dollar-denominated liabilities, which represent the only available means of long-term borrowing. Currency mismatches are a particular danger for firms and sectors in non-tradable goods and services. Countries with high levels of DLD, moreover, are often afflicted as well with "Original Sin," a country's inability to borrow in its own currency. While the resulting vulnerability may not be apparent in normal times, it can be revealed during turbulent times, even in the absence of a major crisis. In economies with fixed or heavily managed exchange rate regimes, for instance, an abrupt change in regime can reveal the exposure of actors who have not hedged for exchange rate risk. Internal as well as external shocks to the real exchange rate and/or real effective rate can produce similarly disruptive balance sheet effects, with economy-wide implications for liquidity. These problems can become particularly acute in an economy without an effective lender of last resort and/or one that issues only domestically denominated debt. Extensive DLD additionally impedes adjustment by means of the real exchange rate and increases the likelihood and severity of a sudden stop. Thus, "fear of floating" (that is not allowing the exchange rate to adjust in the face of external shocks, see: floating exchange rate) may be a consequence of DLD, as countries with unofficially dollarized economies may find a freely moving exchange rate to be too costly. Berkmen and Cavallo tested the causality between DLD and fear of floating empirically; their findings support the "fear of floating" argument. Countries with high liability dollarization (external, public, or financial) tend to stabilize their exchange rate. This finding is robust to various proxies for exchange rate management. For the reverse causality, on the other hand, the authors do not find evidence that more active intervention in foreign exchange markets (i.e., more fixing) leads to higher liability dollarization.

Over time, economies with high levels of DLD can display the following problems: i) an unstable demand for money; ii) a high propensity to experience banking crises following a depreciation of the local currency; and iii) slow and volatile output growth without a significant increase in domestic financial system depth.

== Policy measures ==
Policy interventions to reduce DLD have taken a variety of recommended and actual forms and have met with varying degrees of success. It is generally agreed that controlling inflation is necessary, as the uncertainties brought about by inflation represent perhaps the greatest single determinant of DLD. Yet reducing inflation alone is generally not considered sufficient to achieve de-dollarization, as economies with high levels of DLD may exhibit hysteresis once actors adjust their expectations and behaviors to transactions denominated in foreign currency.

In addition, low volatility of inflation relative to the volatility of RER depreciation may be needed to lead to de-dollarization. To date, only two countries, Israel in the 1980s and 1990s and Poland in the 1990s, have managed to engage in successful de-dollarization without extensive negative consequences; both countries managed this transition through combining disinflation with a strong exchange rate anchor. Moreover, in addition to a one-year mandatory hold on dollar deposits, Israel undertook a series of "patches" including the following: i) CPI-indexed deposits; ii) requirements that banks undertake active hedging of currency risk for non-tradable activities; iii) active development of financial derivatives markets; and iv) efforts to deepen local currency bond markets. Poland's disinflationary efforts, moreover, coincided with a very high real exchange rate. Under less favorable circumstances, or in the absence of policies designed to facilitate adjustment, forced de-dollarization has provoked extensive capital flight and/or steep declines in financial intermediation.

== Prospects ==
In recent years there has been a revival of interest in lending in domestic currency, especially in Latin America, and there is evidence that public debt has in fact become less dollarized. This revival may represent an attempt to "lean against the wind" in the face of expectations of currency appreciation as well as a response to the collapse of Argentina's Convertibility regime, which illustrated the macroeconomic risks of extensive DLD.

A second potential channel of de-dollarization is the increasing use of domestic currency lending to the private sector as well as to sovereigns and subnational governments by international financial institutions, particularly the Inter-American Development Bank. In addition to hedging those institutions' currency risk, multilateral lending in domestic currency offers a potential solution to a first mover problem and a signal to other economic actors.

== See also ==
- Asset–liability mismatch
- Currency substitution (dollarization)
- Debt of developing countries
- External debt
- Floating exchange rate
- Inflation
- List of countries by external debt
- Odious debt
- Original sin (economics)
- Sudden stop (economics)
