= Fear of floating =

Economic policy

Fear of floating is the hesitancy of a country to follow a floating exchange rate regime, rather than a fixed exchange rate. This is more relevant in emerging economies, especially when they suffered from financial crisis in the last two decades. In foreign exchange markets of the emerging market economies, there is evidence showing that countries who claim they are floating their currency, are actually reluctant to let the nominal exchange rate fluctuate in response to macroeconomic shocks. In the literature, this is first convincingly documented by Calvo and Reinhart with "fear of floating" as the title of one of their papers in 2000. Since then, this widespread phenomenon of reluctance to adjust exchange rates in emerging markets is usually called "fear of floating". Most of the studies on "fear of floating" are closely related to literature on costs and benefits of different exchange rate regimes.

== Floating vs. Fixed exchange rate ==
To understand the benefits and costs of floating a currency, we need to make a simple comparison between a floating exchange rate and a fixed (or pegged) exchange rate. A floating exchange rate refers to the situation when the currency's value is allowed to fluctuate according to the foreign exchange market. The value of this currency is determined by the supply and demand shocks in the market of the currency (foreign exchange market). Most of the countries adopting the free, floating exchange rate regimes (floaters) are developed small open economies, such as Canada, Australia, Sweden.

The basic debate between fixed and floating exchange rate regimes is mentioned in most principle of macroeconomics textbooks, where the Mundell–Fleming model is presented to explain the exchange rate regimes. Three, potentially desirable policies, are called "impossible trinity" because a country could not achieve all three at the same time.

- fixed exchange rate
- open to capital flows
- independent central bank and monetary policy

Some economists believe, in most circumstances, floating exchange rates are preferable to fixed exchange rates. Firstly, giving up the fixed exchange rate could gain more flexibility in monetary policy. For some countries, inflation is the main policy target by the central bank. It is often true that a high degree of exchange rate flexibility would help inflation targeting to be more successful. Secondly, as floating exchange rates automatically adjust, they enable a country to dampen the impact of shocks and foreign business cycles, and to preempt the possibility of having a balance of payments crisis.

In practice, a central bank would not ignore substantial movements in exchange rate. Most monetary authorities in emerging market economies have two implicit targets, they aim to maintain a low inflation while also avoiding large currency movements.

Central banks in emerging economies will usually intervene to stabilize the currency when there is too much fluctuation in a short time period by using policy instruments. Thus, a pure floating exchange rate regime is quite rare in reality, most of floating currencies may be classified as a "managed float". However, the extent to which some developing countries control the fluctuation in nominal exchange rates appears to go beyond merely dampening large exchange rate changes. Other reasons are required to justify this "fear of floating" phenomenon.

== Empirical evidence ==
To find out empirical statistics to assess this phenomenon, we could consider some countries with relatively pure floating regimes as benchmark cases, for example United States and Japan. After calculating the monthly variation in percentage for developing countries in data sample, Calvo and Reinhart constructed a statistic to measure the flexibility of exchange rate. They compute the probability that the monthly change in the nominal exchange rate lies inside the 2.5 percent band. A higher probability implies a less flexible exchange rate time series.

As indicated in Table 1 of Calvo and Reinhart (2002), the probability is 58.7% for United States and 61.2% for Japan. Nevertheless, for developing countries who are classified as floaters (both free floaters and managed floaters), the probability on average reaches 77.4%.

This is even more surprising since in conventional wisdom, developing countries are subject to larger shocks. These statistics reveals preference for a relative stable exchange rate fluctuations in developing countries with floating exchange rate, or "fear of floating".

Following this preference for low variability in exchange rate, these countries try to smooth out exchange rate fluctuations though they announced intentions to float. In practice, the monetary authorities achieve so by two instruments, actively intervening in the foreign exchange markets and engaging in an active interest rate defense of the currency. These two policy reactions are also suggested by the data on interest rates and foreign reserves in emerging countries. The corresponding data indicates that there is a much larger variability in for international reserves and substantially smaller variation in interest rate in developing countries.

Here are a list of examples. More examples are provided by reviewing history of exchange rate regimes in different countries. Bolivia announced it would freely float in September 1985, but actually the exchange rate is not quite floating. It is closely pegged to the US dollar so that the regime was reclassified as a managed float.

In recent Asian financial crisis in 1997–1998, there is a substantial output drop as well as high inflation associated with a large decline in currency value. Although Korea and Thailand adopt the new floating regime, they seem to accumulate foreign reserves by control the exchange rate with intervention in the foreign market. This could be regarded as precautionary accumulation of international reserves to avoid similar financial crisis as 1997-98 crisis in the future. It is also claimed that by tying their currencies to the dollar, Asian governments are creating global economic strains, the fear of floating does exist in Asian emerging economies.

There also is evidence that the predominance of foreign currency liabilities in the banks’ balance sheets in Turkey induces a selling pressure in the exchange market as well as a fear of floating.

== Explanations ==
Why might a country prefer a smooth exchange rate with low volatility and be reluctant to float the currency? A free floating exchange rate would increase foreign exchange volatility. The volatility might be very large during crisis period. This could cause serious problems, especially in emerging economies.

=== Financial dollarization and original sin ===
Firstly, financial dollarization (also referred to as liability dollarization) is one main reason against floating exchange rate. It refers to the situations where liabilities are denominated in foreign currencies (usually denominated in US dollar) while assets are in the local currency. Consequently. liability dollarization is also used interchangeably with currency mismatch. Under this currency mismatch, an unexpected depreciation of local currency would deteriorate bank and corporation's balance sheets, and the shrink in asset relative to foreign currency debts would threaten the stability of the financial system in local country. In countries with significant currency mismatches, the balance sheet effect is quite substantial, ignoring the high exchange rate volatility can prove to be very costly. This could provide an argument for sterilized foreign market intervention.

The situation that "most developing countries are not able to borrow abroad in their domestic currency" is referred to "original sin" in economics literature. Original sin is present among most of the developing economies, especially in periods with high inflation rate and currency depreciation. This global capital market imperfection contributes a lot to the widespread liability dollarization phenomenon. International transaction costs, network externalities, lack of credible domestic policies and underdeveloped local bond market are claimed to be the main reasons to the original sin.

=== Contractionary depreciation ===
The cases of fear of floating mainly focus on the case of currency depreciation. Following the currency mismatch channel and balance sheet effects above, there is an output cost associated with depreciation of domestic currency, sometimes this adverse effect in output is called contractionary depreciation/devaluation.

More generally, uncertainty in real exchange rate would reduce investment, and thus generating extra output costs. Actually, volatility affects economic growth not only through its direct impact on lowering investment, but may also harm productivity growth by affecting the efficiency of investment allocation. For example, some economists find strong evidence of how relative price volatility affect sectoral allocation of investment away from what total factor productivity (TFP) differences would indicate. Furthermore, to smooth out exchange rate fluctuations, emerging countries are usually engaged in an active interest rate defense of the currency. There is also an output cost of raising interest rates. In a model with nominal wage rigidities, changes in exchange rate implies changes in actual real wage. As a result, "involuntary unemployment" and "voluntary unemployment" would arise due to labor market wage distortions.

If these output costs due to exchange rate fluctuations are sufficiently large relative to the cost of intervention, it is optimal of the decision maker to stabilize the exchange rate.

=== Concern of credibility and inflation ===
Another main reason for fear of floating arises from the combination of lack of credibility, a high pass-through from exchange rates to prices and inflation targeting. This is also motivated by the fact that there is trend in emerging markets to couple floating with explicit inflation target. Calvo and Reinhart present a simple model to show "fear of floating" is attributed to lack of credibility and inflation targeting. The main idea is that large exchange rate volatility may lead to inflation volatility, which reduces the credibility of monetary policymakers for inflation targeting. This high inflation volatility is very costly due to higher risk premia, hedging costs and unforeseen redistribution of wealth.

=== Fear of appreciation ===
The term "fear of floating" has been mainly used to describe intervention in foreign exchange market to avoid sudden or large depreciation. However, as highlighted by Levy Yeyati and Sturzenegger among others, in some cases intervention has also been aimed at avoiding quick appreciations of domestic currency, particularly in the 2000s. One typical example is the debate on undervalued Chinese currency, RMB and the huge foreign reserve accumulated from trade surplus.

The well-known argument against appreciation against US dollar comes from a neo-mercantilist (see Neomercantilism) view. A depreciated real exchange rate could stimulate the export industries, and provide protection for domestic industries since foreign good are more expensive in terms of domestic currency.

A large number of scholars and policy makers examine whether this "fear of appreciation" has a positive impact on growth performance in developing economies. Some economists show that depreciated exchange rates appear to induce higher growth, but that the effect works largely through the deepening of domestic savings and capital accumulation, rather than through import substitution or export booms as argued by the mercantilism view. Some other studies believe the recent reserve accumulation in east Asia from increasing net export could enhance economic growth. They develop a model showing that foreign reserve accumulation by currency under-devaluation could be a second-best policy in economies with learning-by-investing externality. Though there is static loss, a higher relative price of tradable goods could lead to a dynamic gain through higher rate of capital accumulation.

== Implication in favor of monetary union ==
=== In favor of monetary union ===
Within one monetary union (e.g. the Euro zone), countries share a single currency or the exchange rate is fixed. So the previous reasons for fears of floating might make the idea of common currency area more alluring to the would-be entrants of the euro zone.

For these countries in Europe, since there is long border, heavy trade and industry links with the euro zone, it is extremely difficult to control the capital flows. For these economies to have an independent monetary policy, it had to let its currency float against the main currencies in the world. In principle, floating exchange rates adjust automatically to keep economy in balance, but in real practice, these fluctuations would sometimes veer wildly from the ideal level. These variations of exchange rates can be a source of instability.

For the countries who recently joined euro zone, most of them are small and very open economies. Exports account for a significant share of the GDP and international trade, the trade with EU countries playing an essential role. As emerging countries, when the currency value becomes volatile they are prone to sudden shifts of investments and capital flows (perhaps by foreign investor "animal spirits" and this is similar to sudden flow stops in Latin American countries).

The exchange rate stability is quite attractive for these emerging countries, in this trade-off between exchange rate stability and monetary independence, the former would dominate since there is less scope to manage domestic prices through an independent monetary policy relative to a closed economy and a large country.

=== Lessons from the recent European debt crisis ===
Monetary Union may also have some adverse effect in the recent European sovereign debt crisis. This fixed exchange rate regime makes it impossible for the central bank to use the exchange rate as a policy instrument. It can not depreciate the currency to dampen the impact of negative shocks and restore balance in current account.

For the recent Greek government debt crisis, a key priority for Greece is to bring the government's budget in a sustainable position. The main problem appears to be the high and still rising net foreign indebtedness. Much of this high level of external debt could attribute to the current account deficits accumulated since the 1990s. One way to deal with the huge current account deficit is to leave the euro area and devalue the domestic currency drachma. The lower exchange rate could promote export and enhance the competitiveness of Greek economy. By quitting the euro area, the central Bank of Greece regains exchange rate as a policy instrument to reduce the huge current account deficit.

On the other hand, each country has an independent fiscal policy to some extent, if there is no credible commitment on fiscal budget, some countries might end up in an over-borrowing problem (e.g. Greece) and trigger the debt crisis. One possible solution is an intergovernmental treaty to put strict caps on government spending and borrowing relative to the current year GDP.

Those situations illustrate that we should not ignore the warnings against currency unions though there is plenty of benefits from joining common currency union. Sometimes it may be very desirable to have the exchange rate as an adjustment tool, especially in large financial crisis, or large upward pressure on exchange rates when defending the currency could be very costly and government does not have sufficient international foreign reserve to fight with speculators. That is why large exchange rate changes are often observed despite "fear of floating."

One typical example is Thailand in 1998 Asian financial crisis. The baht was pegged at 25 to the US dollar before the crisis. During the crisis, the slowdown in export growth caused Thailand to abandon the dollar peg and devalue its currency in order to promote exports. The baht devalued rapidly and lost more than half of its value. In January 1998, the baht reached its lowest point of 56 units to the US dollar.

== See also ==
- Exchange rate
- Floating exchange rate
- Domestic Liability Dollarization
- Mundell–Fleming model
- Inflation targeting
- Monetary union
- Impossible trinity
