= Original sin (economics) =

Inability of countries to borrow abroad in domestic currency

Original sin is a term in economics literature, proposed by Barry Eichengreen, Ricardo Hausmann, and Ugo Panizza in a series of papers to refer to a situation in which "most countries are not able to borrow abroad in their domestic currency."

The name is a reference to the concept of original sin in Christianity.

== Original sin hypothesis ==
The original sin hypothesis has undergone a series of changes since its introduction.

The original sin hypothesis was first defined as a situation "in which the domestic currency cannot be used to borrow abroad or to borrow long term even domestically" by Barry Eichengreen and Ricardo Hausmann in 1999. Based on their measure of original sin (shares of home currency-denominated bank loans and international bond debt), they showed that original sin was present in most of the developing economies and independent from histories of high inflation and currency depreciation. However, this early study left the causes of original sin as an open question.

In the second version of the original sin hypothesis, Barry Eichengreen, Ricardo Hausmann and Ugo Panizza in 2002 discarded the domestic element of original sin and redefined (international) original sin as a situation in which most countries cannot borrow abroad in their own currency. They showed that almost all countries (except US, Euro area, Japan, UK, and Switzerland) suffered from (international) original sin over time. Eichengreen, et al. concluded that weaknesses of national macroeconomic policies and institutions are not statistically related to original sin and found that the only statistically robust determinant of original sin was country size. Moreover, they claimed that international transaction costs, network externalities, and global capital market imperfections were the main reasons (which are beyond the control of an individual country) for original sin. Hence, as a solution for the original sin problem, they proposed an international initiative and recommended development of a basket index of emerging-market currencies so that international financial institutions could issue debt denominated in this index until a liquid-market in this index had developed. Burger and Warnock (2003) suggested inclusion of information on domestic bond markets to account for the possibility that foreign investors were holding local-currency emerging market bonds to analyze the determinants of original sin. Using this expanded measure, they showed that emerging markets economies could develop local bond markets (in which they can borrow in domestic currency) and attract global investors with stronger institutions and credible domestic policies. Reinhart, Rogoff and Savastano (2003) criticized the suggested international solution for the original sin problem by claiming that the main problem of emerging market economies is to learn how to borrow less (debt intolerance) rather than learn how to borrow more in their domestic currency.

In these two earlier versions of original sin hypothesis, Eichengreen, Hausmann and Panizza argued that in the presence of high levels of original sin, domestic investments will have a currency mismatch (projects that generate domestic currency will be financed with a foreign currency) so that macroeconomic and financial instability will be unavoidable. Hence, original sin and currency mismatch are used interchangeable in these early studies. Goldstein and Turner (2003) criticized this by showing that large output losses due to the currency mismatches during financial crises could not be attributed to original sin. Hence, they claimed that the original sin is not a sufficient condition for a currency mismatch.

In their last version of their original sin hypothesis, Eichengreen, Hausmann and Panizza defined domestic component of original sin as the "inability to borrow domestically long-term at fixed rates in local currency" while keeping the definition of (international) original sin same. They reported that no country (having an original sin ratio higher than 0.75) with high domestic original sin had low international original sin suggesting that if a country could not persuade its own citizens to lend in local currency at long maturities, it could not convince foreigners to do the same. On the other hand, they reported that seven countries, among the 21 emerging countries included in their sample, had low domestic original sin but relatively high international original sin, suggesting that dominant use of local currency in domestic markets is not a sufficient condition for dominant use internationally.

== Measures of original sin ==
There are three different measures of original sin in economics literature. These measures are defined mathematically as one minus the fraction of own currency-denominated securities in the relevant total. Original sin measures range between 0 and 1. A high measure of original sin indicates that a country suffers from high level of original sin. Thus, a country that issues all of its securities in foreign currency would have an original sin measure of one, while a country that issues all of its securities in its domestic currency would have an original sin measure of zero.

=== OSIN1 ===
The first measure of original sin (OSIN1) is defined as one minus the ratio of the stock of international securities issued by a country in its own currency and the total stock of international securities issued by the country. As this measure tends to 1, the greater the original sin. This index suffers from two shortcomings. First, it is based solely on securities but no other debts. Second, it ignores the effect of other financial instruments, e.g., swaps, which are widely used for hedging currency risk.

$OSIN1_{i}=1-\frac{\text{Securities issued by country i in currency i}}{\text{Securities issued by country i}}$

=== OSIN2 ===
The second version of the original sin index (OSIN2) is based on two intermediate measures: INDEXA and OSIN3. Unlike OSIN1, INDEXA accounts for bank loans in addition to bond debt and OSIN3 accounts for swaps. Thus, OSIN2 has the advantage of wider coverage; however, it is a less precise measure of original sin because of data limitations of bank loans.

$$OSIN2_i=max(INDEXA_{i},OSIN3_i)$$

where;

$$INDEXA_{i}={\text{Securities} + \text{loans issued by country i in major currencies} \over \text{Securities} + \text{loans issued by country i}}$$

=== OSIN3 ===
The last measure of the original sin is based on an intermediate index (INDEXB) which aims to capture the effects of the swaps on original sin and is defined as

$OSIN3_i=max(INDEXB_i,0)$

where INDEXB is defined as one minus the ratio between international securities issued in a given currency and the amount of the international securities issued by the corresponding country.

$INDEXB_i=1-\frac{\text{Securities in currency i (regardless of the nationality of the issuer)}}{\text{Securities issued by country i}}$

These measures of original sin suggest that the United States, United Kingdom, Japan, Switzerland (financial centers), and Euroland countries are more successful in issuing their securities in their own domestic currencies relative to developing countries. Moreover, these measures indicate that the original sin is persistent over 1993-2001 period in all country groups.

Measures of original sin by country grouping, simple average
	OSIN1	OSIN1	OSIN2	OSIN2	OSIN3	OSIN3
Group	1993–98	1999–2001	1993–98	1999–2001	1993–98	1999–2001
Financial centers	0.58	0.53	0.34	0.37	0.07	0.08
Euroland	0.86	0.53	0.55	0.72	0.53	0.09
Other developed	0.90	0.94	0.80	0.82	0.78	0.72
Offshore	0.98	0.97	0.95	0.98	0.96	0.87
Developing	1.00	0.99	0.98	0.98	0.96	0.93
Latin American and Caribbean	1.00	1.00	1.00	1.00	0.98	1.00
Middle East and Africa	1.00	0.99	0.97	0.99	0.95	0.90
Asia Pacific	1.00	0.99	0.95	0.99	0.99	0.94
Eastern Europe	0.99	1.00	0.97	0.98	0.91	0.84
Source: Eichengreen, Hausmann, and Panizza (2002)

== Determinants of original sin ==
Empirical studies mainly focus on a few parameters as being the determinants of the original sin: (i) the level of development, (ii) monetary credibility, (iii) level of debt burden, (iv) the exchange rate regime, (v) slope of the yield curve, and (vi) size of the investor base.

The first determinant is level of development; measured generally with GDP per capita. Empirical studies indicate that GDP per capita is significantly correlated with original sin. However, this result is not robust to inclusion of other regressors (Hausmann and Panizza, 2003).

The second determinant of the original sin is monetary credibility. This is important for both domestic and international original sin. The monetary credibility is proxied usually by inflation. Generally, the ratio of domestic debt to total public debt is higher in countries with lower and less volatile inflation indicating that inflation can change the composition of public debt and make it riskier. Hausmann and Panizza (2003) find that monetary credibility, as measured by lower inflation and the imposition of capital controls, are associated with lower domestic original sin in emerging economies. On the international side, their study shows that if the monetary and fiscal authorities are inflation prone, foreign investors will lend only in foreign currency, which is protected against inflation risk, or at short maturities, so that the interest rates can be adjusted quickly to any acceleration of inflation.

The third determinant is the level of debt burden. High public indebtedness gives rise to an inability to service debt. Consequently, governments attempt to reduce debt service costs through inflation, unexpected changes in interest rates, explicit taxation, or outright default. Such situations reduce their credibility. Therefore, governments will tend to have a shorter maturity debt composition to enhance credibility when the debt burden is high. Most commonly, the ability to service debt is proxied with an array of macroeconomic indicators including the ratios of the fiscal balance to GDP, primary balance to GDP, government debt to exports and government debt to GDP (Hausman et al., 2003 and Mehl et al., 2005).

The fourth determinant is the exchange rate regime. As indicated by Hausmann and Panizza (2003), countries with fixed exchange rate regime experience large volatility in their domestic-currency interest rate, while countries that have a floating exchange rate regime experience larger exchange rate volatility. This creates differences in the structures of borrowing. Empirical studies show that fixed exchange rate regime is the main reason of liability dollarization. Despite these common weaknesses, emerging and developing economies have been able to attract capital because they have often operated under fixed or pegged exchange rate regimes until the early 2000s.

The fifth attempt is the slope of the yield curve. In theory, and given the existence of term premiums, issuing short-term debt is cheaper than issuing long-term debt. However, refinancing risk is higher for short-term debt and frequent refinancing implies a larger risk of financing with higher interest rates. Therefore, governments face a trade-off between cheaper funding costs, which tilts the duration towards short-term maturities and refinancing risk, which tilts the duration towards longer-term maturities. Generally, an upward-sloping yield curve is associated with higher long-term borrowing to meet investor demand and, hence, lower original sin.

Moreover, size of the investor base is another determinant of the domestic original sin. This concept actually indicates the level of financial development which is measured most of the time by a ratio of total domestic credits to GDP. Finally, a special care to the level of openness which is generally measured by total foreign trade, should be taken into account.

== See also ==
- Debt intolerance
- Asset–liability mismatch
- External debt
- List of countries by external debt
- Third world debt
- Odious debt
- Eurodad
- Currency crisis
- Sovereign default
- Domestic liability dollarization
