= Ashton v. Cameron County Water Improvement District No. 1 =

- Supreme Court of the United States

Decided May 25, 1936
- Full case name: Ashton v. Cameron County Water Improvement District No. 1
- Citations: 298 U.S. 513 (more)

Holding
- An insolvent state agency cannot declare bankruptcy.

Court membership
- Chief Justice Charles E. Hughes Associate Justices Willis Van Devanter · James C. McReynolds; Louis Brandeis · George Sutherland; Pierce Butler · Harlan F. Stone; Owen Roberts · Benjamin N. Cardozo

Case opinions
- Majority: McReynolds, joined by Van Devanter, Sutherland, Butler, Roberts
- Dissent: Cardozo, joined by Hughes, Brandeis, Stone

Laws applied
- Bankruptcy Clause
- Superseded by
- United States v. Bekins

Ashton v. Cameron County Water Improvement District No. 1, 298 U.S. 513 (1936), was a United States Supreme Court case in which the court held that an insolvent state agency cannot declare bankruptcy. More particularly, Congress's powers under the Bankruptcy Clause cannot extend to state agencies in violation of federalism principles, and bankruptcy courts cannot establish jurisdiction over the state agencies where those principles have been violated. The modern municipal bankruptcy statute, Chapter 9 of the Bankruptcy Code, is constitutional.

== Background ==
Cameron County Water Improvement District No. 1 was a public corporation managed by the state of Texas that constructed canals initially funded with debt raised by government bonds. The Great Depression severely limited Cameron County farmers' ability to pay taxes intended to fund the District's obligations. Within some years, the District accrued a debt of hundreds of thousands of dollars, and it had liabilities in the tens of millions. With the consent of Texas, the District declared bankruptcy under the Municipal Bankruptcy Act of 1934, a New Deal amendment to the Bankruptcy Act of 1898. The District presented a compromise plan to rectify the debt at a considerable loss to creditors.

Large owners of the District's debt objected to the bankruptcy, claiming bankruptcy courts had no jurisdiction over state entities. The trial court agreed with the creditors, but the Circuit Court of Appeals reversed because the Bankruptcy Clause gives Congress the power to enact uniform bankruptcy rules.

== Opinion of the court ==
In a majority opinion by Justice James C. McReynolds, the Supreme Court reversed the Circuit Court and held the bankruptcy courts could not have jurisdiction over state entities. In McReynolds's view, allowing a state corporation to use the bankruptcy process would have been tantamount to allowing the government to break a contract without proper compensation to the creditors. McReynolds made a federalism argument that it could not be a valid exercise of the Bankruptcy Clause because it was inappropriate to use the federal system's bankruptcy power to interfere with and change the conditions of state agencies.

== Significance ==
The Court decided Ashton towards the end of the Lochner era and in direct opposition to the New Deal's reforms to the bankruptcy system. In response to Ashton and similar cases, President Franklin D. Roosevelt began threatening to pack the court with new justices who would approve the reforms. After the so-called "switch in time that saved nine," the Supreme Court de-emphasized the economic analyses that motivated Ashton.

== Aftermath ==
Congress passed a revised Municipal Bankruptcy Act in 1937. The Supreme Court upheld its constitutionality in United States v. Bekins. Today, municipal bankruptcies are handled under Chapter 9 of the Bankruptcy Code.
