= Financial system =

System that allows the transfer of funds

A financial system is a system that allows the exchange of funds between financial market participants such as lenders, investors, and borrowers. Financial systems operate at national and global levels. Financial institutions consist of complex, closely related services, markets, and institutions intended to provide an efficient and regular linkage between investors and borrowers.

In other words, financial systems can be known wherever there exists the exchange of a financial medium (money) while there is a reallocation of funds into needy areas (financial markets, business firms, banks) to utilize the potential of ideal money and place it in use to get benefits out of it. This whole mechanism is known as a financial system.

Money, credit, and finance are used as media of exchange in financial systems. They serve as a medium of known value for which goods and services can be exchanged as an alternative to bartering. A modern financial system may include banks (public sector or private sector), financial markets, financial instruments, and financial services. Financial systems allow funds to be allocated, invested, or moved between economic sectors, and they enable individuals and companies to share the associated risks.

== The components of a financial system ==
There are mainly four components of the financial system:

1. Financial markets - the market place where buyers and sellers interact with each other and participate in the trading of bonds, shares and other assets are called financial markets.
2. Financial instruments - the products which are traded in the financial markets are called financial instruments. Based on different requirements and credit seekers, the securities in the market also differ from each others.
3. Financial institutions - financial institutions are acting as a mediator between the investors and borrowers. They provide financial services for members and clients. It is also termed as financial intermediaries because they act as middlemen between the savers and borrowers. The investor's savings are mobilized either directly or indirectly via the financial markets. They offer services to organisations who want to raise funds from markets and take care of financial assets (deposits, securities, loan, etc.).
4. Financial services - services provided by assets management and liabilities management companies. They help to get the required funds and also make sure that they are efficiently invested. (e.g. banking services, insurance services and investment services)

== Banks ==
UML class diagram depicting a banking system

Banks are financial intermediaries that lend money to borrowers to generate revenue and accept deposits. They are typically regulated heavily, as they provide market stability and consumer protection. Banks include:

- Public banks
- Commercial banks
- Central banks
- Cooperative banks
- State-managed cooperative banks
- State-managed land development banks

== Non-bank financial system ==
Non-bank financial systems facilitate financial services like investment, risk pooling, and market brokering. They generally do not have full banking licenses. Non-bank financial system include:

- Finance and loan companies

=== Financial markets ===
Financial markets are markets in which securities, commodities, and fungible items are traded at prices representing supply and demand. The term "market" typically means the institution of aggregate exchanges of possible buyers and sellers of such items.

==== Primary markets ====
The primary market (or initial market) generally refers to new issues of stocks, bonds, or other financial instruments. The primary market is divided in two segments, the money market and the capital market.

==== Secondary markets ====
The secondary market refers to transactions in financial instruments that were previously issued.

=== Financial instruments ===
Financial instruments are tradable financial assets of any kind. They include money, evidence of ownership interest in an entity, and contracts.

==== Derivative instruments ====
A derivative instrument is a contract that derives its value from one or more underlying entities (including an asset, index, or interest rate).

== Financial services ==
Financial services are offered by a large number of businesses that encompass the finance industry. These include credit unions, banks, credit card companies, insurance companies, stock brokerages, and investment funds.

== See also ==
- Global financial system
- Finance § The financial system
- Financial services
- Financial market
- Circular flow of income
