= Panic of 1837 =

19th-century United States financial crisis

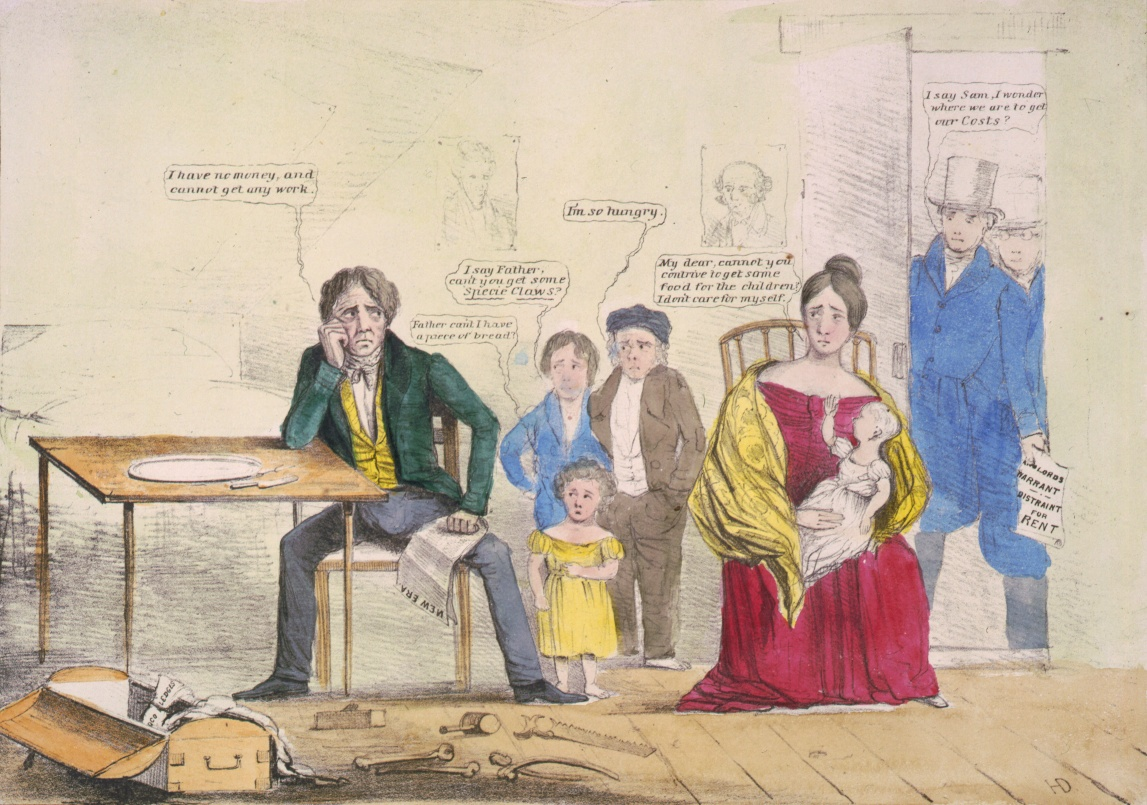
- Whig cartoon showing the effects of unemployment on a family that has portraits of Democratic Presidents Andrew Jackson and Martin Van Buren on the wall
- Date: May 10, 1837 – mid-1840s
- Location: United States
- Type: Financial crisis, economic depression
- Outcome: Nationwide suspension of specie payments; Failure of over 600 banks and sharp credit contraction; Collapse of the western land bubble and cotton market prices; Six-year macroeconomic depression with widespread unemployment; Whig Party political victory in the 1840 presidential election

The Panic of 1837 was a financial crisis in the United States that began a major depression which lasted until the mid-1840s. Profits, prices, and wages dropped, westward expansion was stalled, unemployment rose, and pessimism abounded.

The panic had both domestic and foreign origins. Speculative lending practices in the West, a sharp decline in cotton prices, a collapsing land bubble, international specie flows, and restrictive lending policies in Britain were all factors. The lack of a central bank to regulate fiscal matters, which President Andrew Jackson had ensured by not extending the charter of the Second Bank of the United States, was also key.

The ailing economy of early 1837 led investors to panic, and a bank run ensued, giving the crisis its name. The bank run came to a head on May 10, 1837, when banks in New York City ran out of gold and silver. They immediately suspended specie payments, and would no longer redeem commercial paper in specie at full face value. A significant economic collapse followed: despite a brief recovery in 1838, the recession persisted for nearly seven years. Over 40% of all banks failed, businesses closed, prices declined, and there was mass unemployment. From 1837 to 1844, deflation in wages and prices was widespread.

As the nation underwent hardships, positive forces were at work that, in time, would invigorate the economy. Railroads had begun their relentless expansion, and furnace masters had discovered how to smelt greater quantities of pig iron. The machine tool and the metalworking industries were taking shape. Coal had begun its ascent, replacing wood as the nation's major source of heat. Innovations with agricultural machinery brought greater productivity from the land. The nation's population also increased by more than one-third during the 1840s, despite the economic turmoil (mostly due to immigration, especially Irish emigration during the Irish Famine).

After downturns in 1845–1846 and 1847–1848, gold was discovered in California in 1848, setting off a prosperity of its own. Meanwhile, individuals and institutions were hurting.

== Causes ==
The crisis followed a period of economic expansion from mid-1834 to mid-1836. The prices of land, cotton, and slaves rose sharply in those years. The boom's origin had many sources, both domestic and international. Because of the peculiar factors of international trade, abundant amounts of silver were coming into the United States from Mexico and China. Land sales and tariffs on imports were also generating substantial federal revenues. Through lucrative cotton exports and the marketing of state-backed bonds in British money markets, the United States acquired significant capital investment from Britain. The bonds financed transportation projects in the United States. British loans, made available through Anglo-American banking houses like Baring Brothers, fueled much of America's westward expansion, infrastructure improvements, industrial expansion, and economic development during the antebellum era.

From 1834 to 1835, Europe experienced a surge in prosperity, which resulted in confidence and an increased propensity for risky foreign investments.

By 1836, directors of the Bank of England had allowed their monetary reserves to decline precipitously in recent years due to an increase in capital speculation and investment in American transportation. Conversely, improved transportation systems increased the supply of cotton, which lowered the market price. Cotton prices were security for loans, and America's cotton kings defaulted. In 1836 and 1837 American wheat crops also suffered from Hessian fly and winter kill which caused the price of wheat in America to increase greatly, which caused American labor to starve.

The hunger in America was not felt by England, whose wheat crops improved every year from 1831 to 1836, and European imports of American wheat had dropped to "almost nothing" by 1836. The directors of the Bank of England, wanting to increase monetary reserves and to cushion American defaults, indicated that they would gradually raise interest rates from 3 to 5 percent. The conventional financial theory held that banks should raise interest rates and curb lending when they were faced with low monetary reserves. Raising interest rates, according to the laws of supply and demand, was supposed to attract specie since money generally flows where it will generate the greatest return if equal risk among possible investments is assumed. In the open economy of the 1830s, which was characterized by free trade and relatively weak trade barriers, the monetary policies of the hegemonic power (in this case Britain) were transmitted to the rest of the interconnected global economic system, including the United States. The result was that as the Bank of England raised interest rates, major banks in the United States were forced to do the same.

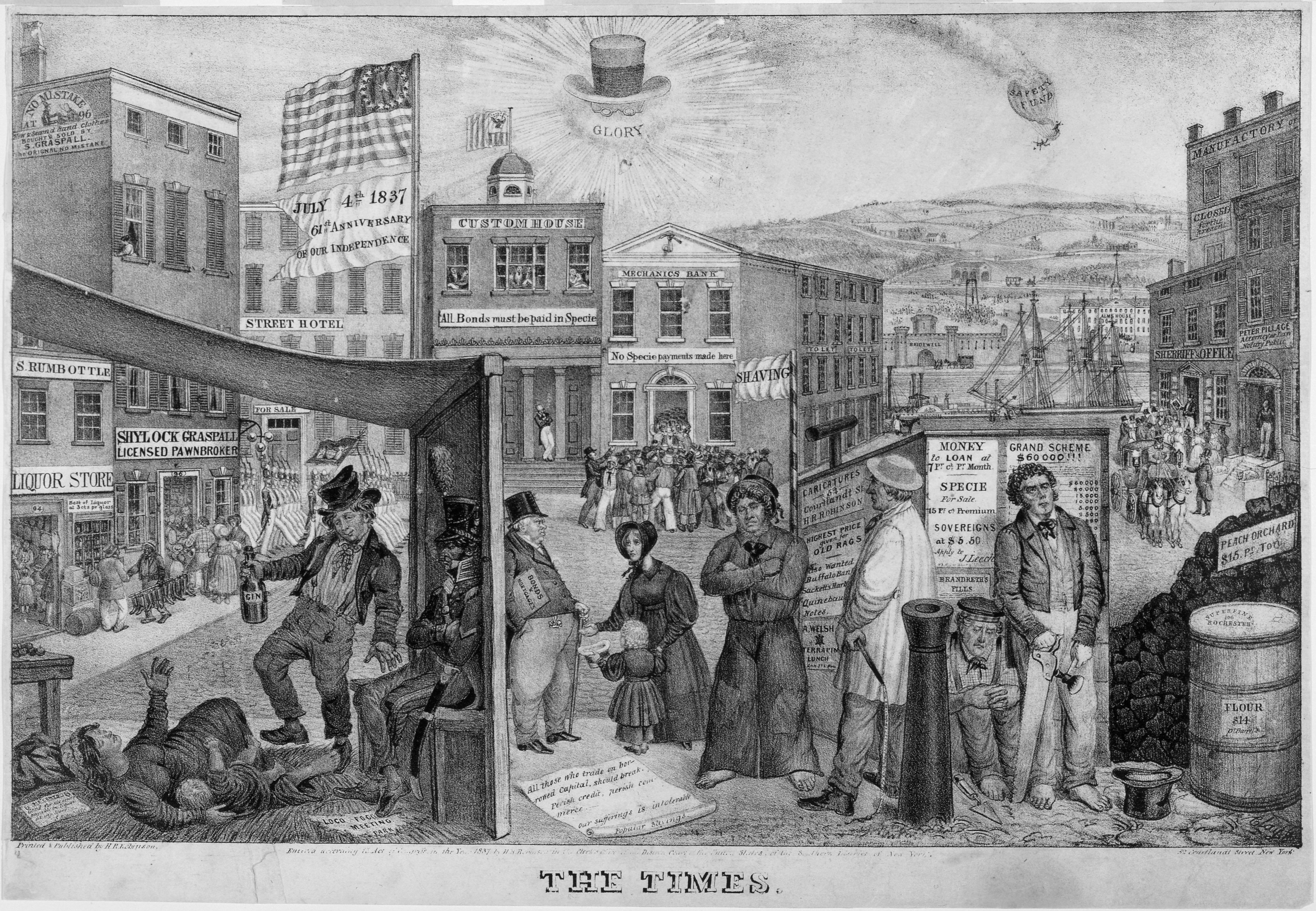
An 1837 caricature blames Andrew Jackson for hard times.

When New York banks raised interest rates and scaled back on lending, the effects were damaging. Since the price of a bond bears an inverse relationship to the yield (or interest rate), the increase in prevailing interest rates would have forced down the price of American securities. Importantly, demand for cotton plummeted. The price of cotton fell by 25% in February and March 1837. The American economy, especially in the southern states, was heavily dependent on stable cotton prices. Receipts from cotton sales provided funding for some schools, balanced the nation's trade deficit, fortified the US dollar, and procured foreign exchange earnings in British pounds, then the world's reserve currency. Since the United States was still a predominantly agricultural economy centered on the export of staple crops and an incipient manufacturing sector, a collapse in cotton prices had massive reverberations.

In the United States, there were several contributing factors. In July 1832, President Jackson vetoed the bill to recharter the Second Bank of the United States, the nation's central bank and fiscal agent. As the bank wound up its operations in the next four years, state-chartered banks in the West and the South relaxed their lending standards by maintaining unsafe reserve ratios. Two domestic policies exacerbated an already volatile situation. The Specie Circular of 1836 mandated that western lands could be purchased only with gold and silver coin, instead of bank loans. The circular was an executive order issued by Jackson and favored by Senator Thomas Hart Benton of Missouri and other hard-money advocates. Its intent was to curb the rampant speculation in public lands, which had fueled what is today referred to as a real estate "bubble". A bubble occurs when the actual value of, in this case, public lands, substantially exceeds the long-term income/resources that the land can produce to pay for itself. Although well intended, the circular had such immediate effect as to set off a real estate and commodity price crash, since most potential buyers were unable to come up with sufficient hard money or "specie" (gold or silver coins) to pay the speculation-driven, inflated prices for the land. Secondly, the Deposit and Distribution Act of 1836 placed federal revenues in various local banks, derisively termed "pet banks", across the country. Many of the banks were located in the West. The effect of both policies was to transfer specie away from the nation's main commercial centers on the East Coast. With inadequate monetary reserves in their vaults, major banks and financial institutions on the East Coast had to scale back their loans, which was a major cause of the panic, besides the real estate crash.

Americans attributed the cause of the panic principally to domestic political conflicts. Democrats typically blamed the bankers, and Whigs blamed Jackson for refusing to renew the Bank of the United States charter and for the withdrawal of government funds from the bank. Martin Van Buren, who became president in March 1837, was largely blamed by his fellow Democrats for the panic even though his inauguration had preceded the panic by only five weeks. Van Buren's refusal to use government intervention to address the crisis, such as emergency relief and increasing spending on public infrastructure projects to reduce unemployment (such as was used 100 years later by Roosevelt during The Great Depression), was accused by his opponents of contributing further to the hardship and the duration of the depression that followed the panic. Jacksonian Democrats, on the other hand, blamed the Bank of the United States for both funding rampant land and commodities speculation via their "easy money" practices and introducing inflationary paper money. Some modern economists view Van Buren's deregulatory economic policy as successful in the long term and argue that it played an important role in revitalizing banks after the panic.

== Effects and aftermath ==
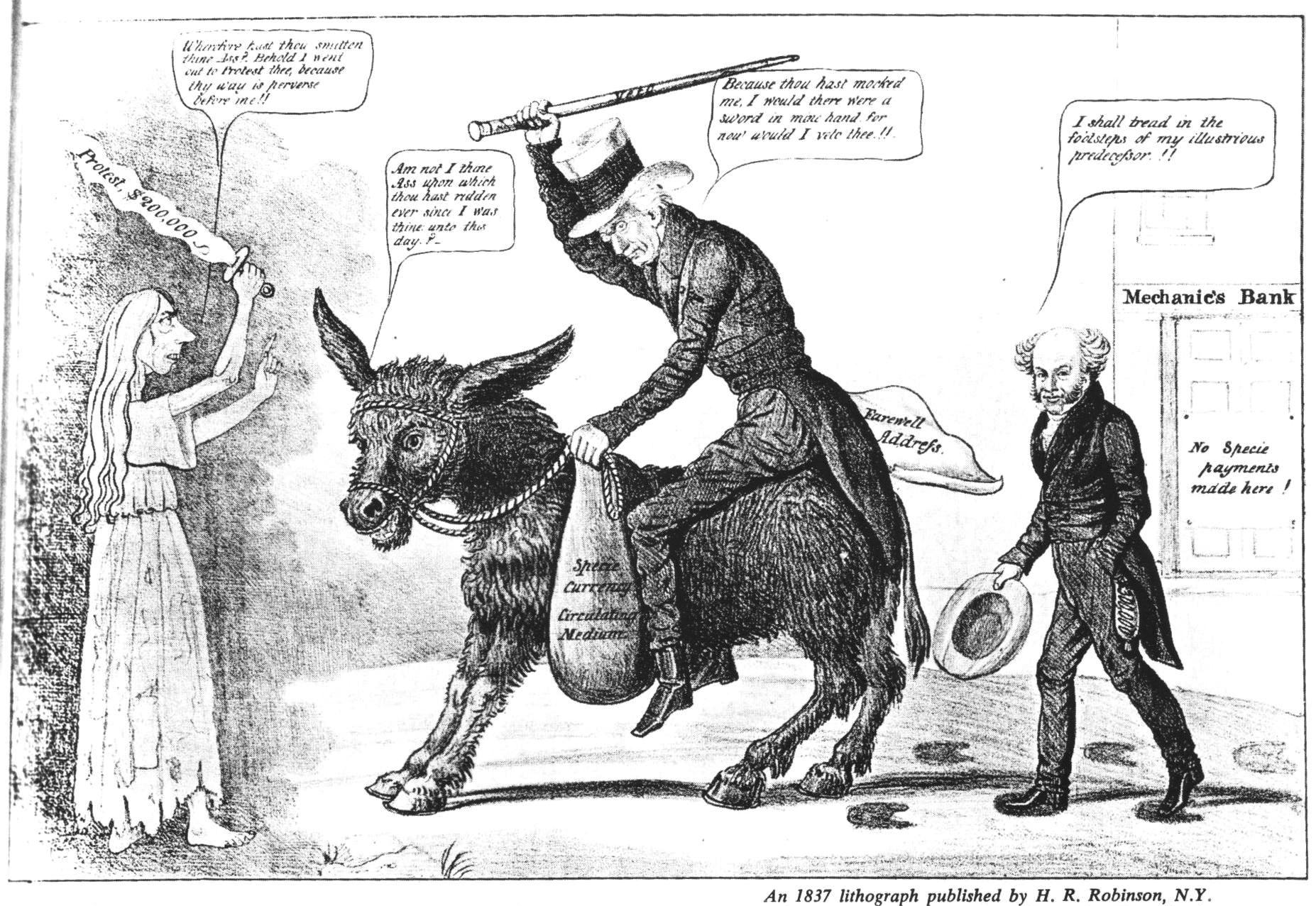
The Modern Balaam and His Ass, an 1837 caricature placing the blame for the Panic of 1837 and the perilous state of the banking system on outgoing President Andrew Jackson, shown riding a donkey, while President Martin Van Buren comments approvingly

Virtually the whole nation felt the effects of the panic. Connecticut, New Jersey, and Delaware reported the greatest stress in their mercantile districts. In 1837, Vermont's business and credit systems took a hard blow. Vermont had a period of alleviation in 1838 but was hit hard again in 1839–1840. New Hampshire did not feel the effects of the panic as much as its neighbors did. It had no permanent debt in 1838 and had little economic stress the following years. New Hampshire's greatest hardship was the circulation of fractional coins in the state.

Conditions in the South were much worse than in the East, and the Cotton Belt was dealt the worst blow. In Virginia, North Carolina, and South Carolina the panic caused an increase in the interest of diversifying crops. New Orleans felt a general depression in business, and its money market stayed in bad condition throughout 1843. Several planters in Mississippi had spent much of their money in advance, which led to the complete bankruptcy of many planters. By 1839, many plantations were thrown out of cultivation. Florida and Georgia did not feel the effects as early as Louisiana, Alabama, or Mississippi. In 1837, Georgia had sufficient coin to carry on everyday purchases. Until 1839, Floridians were able to boast about the punctuality of their payments. Georgia and Florida began to feel the negative effects of the panic in the 1840s.

At first, the West did not feel as much pressure as the East or the South. Ohio, Indiana, and Illinois were agricultural states, and the good crops of 1837 were a relief to the farmers. In 1839, agricultural prices fell, and the pressure reached the agriculturalists.

Within two months the losses from bank failures in New York alone aggregated nearly $100 million. Out of 850 banks in the United States, 343 closed entirely, 62 failed partially, and the system of state banks received a shock from which it never fully recovered. The publishing industry was particularly hurt by the ensuing depression.

Many individual states defaulted on their bonds, which angered British creditors. The United States briefly withdrew from international money markets. Only in the late 1840s did Americans re-enter those markets. The defaults, along with other consequences of the recession, carried major implications for the relationship between the state and economic development. In some ways, the panic undermined confidence in public support for internal improvements. The panic unleashed a wave of riots and other forms of domestic unrest. The ultimate result was an increase in the state's police powers, including more professional police forces.

== Recovery ==
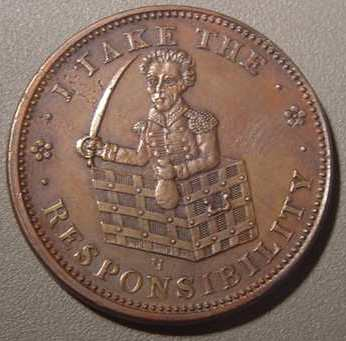
Hard times token, late 1830s; privately minted, used in place of the one-cent coin during currency shortage; inscription reads "I Take the Responsibility", showing Andrew Jackson holding a drawn sword and a coin bag emerging from a strongbox.

Most economists agree that there was a brief recovery from 1838 to 1839, which ended when the Bank of England and Dutch creditors raised interest rates. The economic historian Peter Temin has argued that when corrected for deflation, the economy grew moderately after 1838. In 1842, the American economy was able to rebound somewhat and overcome the five-year depression, but according to most accounts, the economy did not recover until 1844. The recovery from the depression intensified after the California gold rush started in 1848, greatly increasing the money supply. By 1850, the US economy was booming again.

Intangible factors like confidence and psychology played powerful roles and helped to explain the magnitude and the depth of the panic. Central banks then had only limited abilities to control prices and employment, making bank runs common. When a few banks collapsed, alarm quickly spread throughout the community and were heightened by partisan newspapers. Anxious investors rushed to other banks and demanded to have their deposits withdrawn. When faced with such pressure, even healthy banks had to make further curtailments by calling in loans and demanding payment from their borrowers. That fed the hysteria even further, which led to a downward spiral or snowball effect. In other words, anxiety, fear, and a pervasive lack of confidence initiated devastating, self-sustaining feedback loops. Many economists today understand that phenomenon as an information asymmetry. Essentially, bank depositors reacted to imperfect information since they did not know if their deposits were safe and so fearing further risk, they withdrew their deposits, even if it caused more damage. The same concept of downward spiral was true for many southern planters, who speculated in land, cotton, and slaves. Many planters took out loans from banks under the assumption that cotton prices would continue to rise. When cotton prices dropped, however, planters could not pay back their loans, which jeopardized the solvency of many banks. These factors were particularly crucial given the lack of deposit insurance in banks. When bank customers are not assured that their deposits are safe, they are more likely to make rash decisions that can imperil the rest of the economy. Economists have concluded that the suspension of convertibility, deposit insurance, and sufficient capital requirements in banks can limit the possibility of bank runs.

== See also ==
- State bankruptcies in the 1840s
- Flour riot of 1837
- History of the United States (1815–1849)
- Kirtland Safety Society
