= Bank walkaway =

A bank walkaway is a decision by a mortgage lender (a bank) to not foreclose on a defaulted mortgage (when the borrower has ceased to make the payments), or to not complete foreclosure proceedings (to "walk away" from the mortgage). These are sometimes referred to as abandoned foreclosures or stalled foreclosures, though this latter term is also used more broadly when the foreclosure process has stalled for other reasons.

In addition to homes directly owned by a bank, the same phenomenon occurs when the home is part of a mortgage-backed security (MBS), in which case it is the mortgage servicer who has chosen to not foreclose or to cease foreclosure proceedings.

In the United States, bank walkaways have increased in recent years in the wake of the United States housing bubble, and they are also known as red flag homes.

== Definition ==
The Government Accountability Office (GAO) defines an abandoned foreclosure as a mortgage that:

- has entered foreclosure,
- the servicer decides to not continue pursuing its interest in a mortgage loan (has stopped the foreclosure proceedings),
- the servicer has charged off the loan (considers it worthless), and
- the home is vacant.

== Rationale ==
The primary reason for bank walkaways is that a bank expects to lose money by foreclosing – when proceeds from a foreclosure sale are expected to be insufficient to cover the cost of the foreclosure itself, together with securing, maintaining, and marketing the home for sale. Thus, if the bank were to foreclose (taking ownership) and then sell the home, the bank expects that it would lose money, and thus chooses to not do so.

Also, if there are problems with the property which the bank, if it takes possession and thus ownership, might become liable for, the bank might choose not to do so. For example, if a property had chemical contamination, excessive refuse or waste, or environmental damage requiring expensive remediation (such as if it was used for the manufacture of crystal meth or other illegal and/or toxic substances), it might be too expensive to rehabilitate the property or clean it up in order to be able to resell it, and thus the bank might decide to abandon the foreclosure and thus not become owner of the distressed property.

== Consequences ==
As with other departures from ordinary home ownership or foreclosure, bank walkaways leave homes in a state of limbo – the houses may be vacant and in dilapidated condition, and the ownership and future of the house are unclear.

When a home is not foreclosed on, the borrower (generally resident or landlord) is still legally responsible for housing taxes, maintenance, and demolition costs, if the house is condemned.

When neither the borrower nor the lender takes responsibility for a house, the city is left with the costs.

== Prevalence ==
=== United States ===
The GAO found that in the period January 2008 to March 2010, mortgage servicers charged off 46,000 properties, with 60 percent of the charge-offs occurring before an initial foreclosure filing was made. In this period, Detroit, Michigan had the highest number of bank walkaways, with Chicago, Illinois being second.

== Resolutions ==
Various resolutions exist, including:

- mediation between the lender and the borrower
- dismissal of the foreclosure action
- completion of the foreclosure (the bank takes ownership), but the home not necessarily subsequently sold.

== See also ==
- Strategic default, opposite situation where the mortgage borrower walks away
