= Strategic bankruptcy =

A strategic bankruptcy may occur when an otherwise solvent company makes use of the bankruptcy laws for some specific business purpose other than simple inability to pay debts.

== Process ==
In the U.S., Chapter 11 bankruptcy made it possible for a business to declare bankruptcy without actually being insolvent. It is also strongly weighted toward retaining the existing management through the process of restructuring, on the basis that the existing management would be most familiar with the business and thus best equipped to preserve as much of its value as possible. These two conditions laid the foundations for modern strategic bankruptcy.

Strategic bankruptcy occurs where bankruptcy is a strategic choice rather than an unavoidable condition. Such a choice might be made to avoid or reduce heavy legal judgements, to sidestep existing contracts, or even as a tool for manipulative debt reduction. Under bankruptcy law, debts are not avoided entirely, but may be significantly reduced to the point where a business owner may consider this option profitable or at least less unprofitable. Existing contracts, collective bargaining agreements, and legal judgements are more likely to be set aside entirely as a result of bankruptcy. These must always be reargued under the different rules applying to bankruptcy proceedings.

== Strategic debt cutting ==
The debt forgiveness inherent in declaring bankruptcy can be used to manipulate debt management. In 2011, Donald Trump told Newsweek that "I do play with the bankruptcy laws – they're very good for me" as a tool for trimming debt." To Forbes, Trump said that "I’ve cut debt – by the way, this isn’t me personally, it’s a company. ... Basically I’ve used the laws of the country to my advantage and to other people’s advantage just as Leon Black has, Carl Icahn, Henry Kravis has, just as many, many others on top of the business world have." Altogether, Trump has filed six times for Chapter 11 bankruptcies for his businesses, some of them three times under different corporate structuring and names.

== Breaking contracts ==
A strategic bankruptcy can be used to get away from expensive contracts which would otherwise be unbreakable. The contracts might be with employees or with business partners.

When the airlines Sabena and Swissair went bankrupt and were restructured, they also were able to break high salary and expensive pension contracts with pilots and other staff.

In 2002 Kmart filed Chapter 11 for protection from creditors. One of the main problems affecting Kmart's cash flow and therefore its liquidity was that Kmart was locked into long-term leases at premium rates with respect to various unprofitable stores. While in chapter 11 reorganization, Kmart was able to renegotiate or rescind those particular leases.

Strategic bankruptcy has been used by Donald Trump to attempt to escape lawsuits over never-built condo projects by placing all responsibility onto his business partners. The claim is that he was not involved in the actual building of the property.

== Same name, different company ==
Owners of companies with deep debts will sometimes open a new company before declaring bankruptcy on the previous company. The phoenix company usually buys all the important assets, including the old name, and continues with much smaller debts. This purchase can be financed by e.g. further investors or bank loans. Since banks are usually prioritized in debt collection, they can get money back from the old company.

The General Motors Chapter 11 reorganization of 2009 resulted in a brand new company, which owned almost all the assets of the old company. Although technically it operates under the new name of NGMCO Inc, which stands for New GM Company, it is still most commonly known as GM, and none of its core branding has changed. However, the old GM stock was removed from the New York Stock exchange in 2009, to be replaced by a new IPO in 2010. This resulted in some initial confusion among investors, some of whom continued to trade in the old shares, which still circulate as Pink Sheets under the symbol MTLQQ.

== Different name, same company ==
The new company may essentially be the old company under a new name. The renaming may simply be part of the Chapter 11 restructuring, or it may be a dodge to avoid legal action. Some fly-by-night businesses habitually close down one business and open an identical business under a new name to mislead potential customers.

After the bankruptcy of the Trump Taj Mahal and The Trump Plaza Hotel and Casino in Atlantic City, in 1991 and 1992 respectively, Trump was held personally liable for some of the debt. He subsequently restructured his resort casinos under the name Trump Hotels and Casinos Resorts to protect himself from future personal liability. Trump Hotels and Casinos Resorts went Chapter 11 bankrupt in 2004, and was essentially replaced by Trump Entertainment Resorts—which itself went Chapter 11 bankrupt in 2009.

== Ethics ==
While the strict legality of strategic bankruptcy is not in doubt, opinions differ over the questions of responsibility and ethics.

Atlantic City lawyer Michael Viscount places the full responsibility for serial strategic bankruptcies upon the creditors who were willing to keep extending credit, and considers Chapter 11 as the ultimate business transaction forum. Assuming all parties involved are aware of the possibility of bankruptcy, strategic bankruptcy then becomes a question of moral hazard.

In contrast, Icahn lawyer Edward Weisfelner argues that good faith ought to be a requirement in bankruptcy proceedings, and that bankruptcy laws were not designed to avoid obligations and artificially elevate personal equity interests above legitimate creditor claims.

The possibility of strategic bankruptcy also raises the possibility of serial strategic bankruptcy as a form of increasingly standard business negotiation. This kind of negotiation is fairly common in the New York real estate market. Stephen Burbank, a law professor at the University of Pennsylvania, describes Donald Trump as "a serial debt avoider."

The Bankruptcy Reform Act of 1978 may have made it easier for business managers to benefit themselves at the expense of bondholders and share value. The original stated intent of the act was to preserve value of assets by keeping them from being scrapped, and thus protect overall business value. However, it also placed more of the power to resolve credit issues directly in the hands of those who may have been involved in creating the insolvency problem in the first place.

== See also ==
- Debt restructuring
- Phoenix company
- Strategic default
- Pre-packaged insolvency
