= Default trap =

The default traps in sovereign borrowing refers to the idea that once a country falls into a default, it is more likely to default again in the future, compared to another country with identical future output ability. The idea of default traps is related with the asymmetric information between the borrower and the lender about the expectation of borrower's future output (GDP), the negative output shocks that increase the borrower's future default probability and other possible factors like political shocks.

== Two phenomenon in sovereign debt ==
=== Vicious circles of borrowing and default ===
In sovereign borrowing history, borrowing and default happened periodically. In the 1820s, the wave of loans to most of the newly independent nations of Latin America was followed by widespread default. Later, all the waves of lending to foreign governments in the 1870s, in the late 1920s, in the 1930s, in the 1980s and in recent years were seen with at least some occurrence of repayment breakdown. For instance, Argentina defaulted or restructured its debts for 4 times during 1824 to 1999, Brazil 7 times, Egypt twice, Philippines once, Chile 3 times, Colombia 7 times, Mexico 8 times, Turkey 6 times and Venezuela did this 9 times during the same period. The average default or restructure frequency among the above 9 countries was 5.2 times. According to institutional investor ratings in September 2002 based on the default history of the above countries, the average repay probability of these countries is 41.6 which is lower than other emerging market countries without default history during the same time. For example, from 1824 to 1999, India, Korea, Malaysia, Singapore and Thailand have no default history and each of their default probability is over 45 and the average probability of them is 61.7. It is apparent that the Latin American countries mentioned above borrow periodically but default for multiple times and therefore were prone to fall into serial default .

In the literature, Lindert and Morton find that countries defaulted over 1820-1929 were 69 per cent more likely to default in the 1930s and that those that incurred arrears and concessionary scheduling during 1940-79 were 70 per cent more likely to default in the 1980s. Rogoff, Reinhart, and Savastano indicates that serial default is only loosely related to countries' indebtedness levels and other fundamentals. They show that serial defaulters have lower credit ratings and face higher spreads (spread is defined as the borrower's debt interest rate minus risk free interest rate) at relatively low indebtedness levels.

=== Default rarely entail permanent exclusion but re-pricing of country risk (higher interest rate) ===
Different from domestic debts, in international lending, there is no explicit mechanism deterring a government from repudiating its external debts. However, the international capital market may still take a number of retaliatory actions to penalize defaulting debtors. Permanent exclusion from international capital market (Eaton and Gersovitz) or random re-entry rules which are not price-dependent (Aguiar and Gopinath) (Arellano) are regarded as the crucial ways to punish and restrict the borrowers' decision to choose default in early literature. But the two ways are too difficult to perform in reality. The more consistent assumption with the reality and which will help to understand default traps is that default is often punished by a worsening of the terms on which the country can borrow again. In the renegotiation process after default, the defaulting country pays the higher rate of return (relative to a risk-free rate) on debt (for example a new bond) that is issued subsequently than non-defaulting countries.

== Default traps mechanism ==
The above two phenomenon are explained by including two structural features: high conditional volatility of output, a well-documented fact in Kose et al. and in Arellano and Catão and Kapur that higher output volatility tends to raise higher interest rates; high persistence in output shocks discussed in Aguiar and Gopinath that greater output persistence tends to raise sovereign default risk. From these literatures, it is clearly that countries with more volatile and persistent output shocks are more likely to face higher spreads (lower debt issuing price) and thus more likely to fall into default traps. Without output shock persistence, default will not have information on the expected future output and future default probability and thus on the change of the future debt to expected output ratio. Volatility on the one hand increases the need for international borrowing to help smooth domestic consumption and on the other hand causes low enough output realizations for borrowers to default.

Apart from the above two features, asymmetric information between the borrowers and the lenders on the nature of the borrowers' output shocks is also a key to the default traps.

In terms of asymmetric information assumption, borrowers are better informed than lenders about the persistence of their output shocks. If borrowers default at first period, upon observing this default, lenders will make an inference about the likely realization of the magnitude of borrowers' first period shocks indirectly and update their expectations to be pessimistic on borrowers' future output and their repayment prospects on future loans. Although borrowers can get fresh lending again, they need to pay higher interest rates than the case they did not default in the past. The gap between the interest rates for fresh lending with and without past default is defined as default premium, which can also be seen as the difference between the new debt issue prices with and without past default. Therefore, if borrowers default, they will face a positive default premium, namely higher interest rates and lower new debt issuing price. If the investment requirement is relatively inelastic, in another word, the amount of investment requirement relatively not affected by debt issuing price, borrowers have to issue more debts to compensate for low issue prices to acquire the required amount of investment. As a result, the ratio of debt to expected output increases and induce a higher probability of future default.

== Debt-to-GDP ratio and default probability ==
The final important chain in the default trap mechanism is that the increase in the ratio of debt to output will induce a higher probability of future default. Is this positive relationship between debts to output ratio with default probability true? Rogoff, Reinhart, and Savastano supported this relationship by tracing a history of default back to 1820s. In their conclusion, they argued that the safe international debt to GNP threshold are low, perhaps as low as 15 percent in some cases and country-specific threshold depends on a country's default history. The probability of default for a given debt-to-GNP level is increasing with the number of past defaults. Moreover, If a country ever defaulted before, even a lower debt to output ratio may be enough to make it default again compared with another country of the same debt level but of no default history. The higher the ratio to output it is, the higher the risk of the default it will be. From the 1970s to 2002, the 9 Latin American default countries like Argentina, Brazil, Chile, Colombia, Egypt, Mexico, Philippines, Turkeys and Venezuela had their average institutional investor ratings (approximate as repayment probability) as 39.4 and average debt to GNP ratio as 44.1, while the no default countries like India, Korea, Malaysia, Singapore and Thailand had 61.8 as their repayment probability and 27 as average debt to GNP ratio.

De Paoli, Hoggarth and Saporta demonstrated the relationship between external debt-to-GDP ratio, bond spreads and credit ratings in figure1. In the left panel of figure1, given an external debt-to-GDP ratio, most past defaulters have higher bond spreads (high new bonds issuing price) than non-defaulters, although Chile and Egypt are exceptions. In the right panel of figure 1, we can see that most past defaulters have a higher debt to GNP ratio but lower repayment probability (higher default probability) than non-defaulters.

== Expansion on default traps ==
=== Political shock and default probability ===
Apart from economic conditions, Political factors play a nontrivial role as determinants of defaults as well. Tomz and Wright reported that even though most default activities occur in periods of low output, the correlation between default decisions and economic conditions is weaker than that implied by existing quantitative models of sovereign default (without political turnover). Political shocks may probability induce default decision in addition to output shocks. The political turnover, says the replacement of a patient (investor-friendly) government by an impatient (less investor-friendly) government is likely to lead to a political default on sovereign debt. Default risk becomes higher after the government turnover.

Take Argentina for example to see the relationship between political turnover and the defaults. After president De La Rua resigned on December 20, 2001, Congress appointed Rodriguez Saa as the interim president on December 23, 2001, and the next day, Rodriguez Saa announced the suspension of all payments on debt instruments (similar to default), which was linked to a decline in sovereign bond prices (post-default spreads lower than pre-default spreads). If we compare the mean value of the index of political risk in the eight years prior to the default date with the mean value between the default date and June 2006, the pre-default mean value of the index is 74.4, and the post-default value is 64.3. A higher value of the index indicates less political risk. These figures show that this government turnover in Argentina was related with higher post-default governments default risk than that of the pre-default governments in the subsequent debt.

=== Lender's limited memory and upper limits of credit history ===
In the case that lenders have the limited memory about the borrower's default history, the credit history will be upgraded at a certain point (the upper limits of credit history) and the default probability will be lower than in the case lenders of full memory. In a word, as the credit history increase, the default probability is weakly increased, given a debt-to-GDP ratio. It may be that at one point, the credit history is upgraded so quickly that the default probability decreases. This is because the periods which the country needs to pay default premium are so short, the impact of default premium on the default probability is quite small.

=== Remedies for default traps ===
What policies should countries adopt to avoid the problem of default traps? Default trap is a chronic long-term problem to address. Policymakers in emerging markets need to internalize the country-specific "safe" debt threshold which depends heavily on the country's default and inflation history. They need to calculate the true long-term costs of defaulting. They also need to be aware that default often exacerbates the problems in the weak fiscal structures and weak financial systems, making these countries more prone to future default. Other factors from economic, political and institutional perspectives are also needed to be considered to find the safe debt threshold.

== See also ==
- Credit default swap
