= United States v. Bekins =

- Supreme Court of the United States

Decided April 25, 1938
- Full case name: United States v. Bekins et al., Trustees, et al.; Lindsay-Strathmore Irrigation District v. Bekins et al., Trustees, et al.
- Citations: 304 U.S. 27 (more)

Holding
- The federal government's bankruptcy powers can extend to state agencies without violating federalism principles.

Court membership
- Chief Justice Charles E. Hughes Associate Justices James C. McReynolds · Louis Brandeis; Pierce Butler · Harlan F. Stone; Owen Roberts · Benjamin N. Cardozo; Hugo Black · Stanley F. Reed

Case opinions
- Majority: Hughes, joined by Brandeis, Stone, Roberts, Black, Reed
- Dissent: McReynolds, joined by Butler
- Cardozo took no part in the consideration or decision of the case.

Laws applied
- Bankruptcy Clause

United States v. Bekins, 304 U.S. 27 (1938), was a United States Supreme Court case in which the court held that the federal government's bankruptcy powers can extend to state agencies without violating federalism principles.

== Significance ==
Two year earlier, the court invalidated the Municipal Bankruptcy Act of 1934 in Ashton v. Cameron County Water Improvement District No. 1, emphasizing concerns over federalism. In response, Congress passed a revised Municipal Bankruptcy Act in 1936 that emphasized the autonomy of states in the bankruptcy process. Bekins upheld the revised statute. Bekins did not explicitly overrule Ashton; instead, it said the statute's respect for federalism was constitutionally adequate.

In dissent, Justice McReynolds (who wrote Ashton) said that Ashton ought to have applied in this case as well.
