= Terminal debt =

Fiscal term

Terminal debt is the point at which the payments on the interest of a debt surpass the revenues of the debtor (i.e. the debt becomes fiscally unstable). In simpler terms, terminal debt is the point at which debt payments become more than the debtor can pay back, resulting in additional penalties on top of the already large debt, causing a runaway effect, usually ending in bankruptcy of the debtor.

== Fiscal sustainability ==
Terminal debt constraints are used in fiscal sustainability analysis to describe limits on debt paths that cannot continue indefinitely. Public debt is generally considered sustainable when a government can continue servicing its obligations without an unrealistically large adjustment to revenue or expenditure, debt relief, rescheduling, or the accumulation of arrears.

A terminal debt condition may be used in long-term fiscal projections to assess whether projected policies imply a stabilising debt path or an explosive one. In this context, the issue is not only the current level of debt, but whether future primary balances, interest costs, and economic growth are consistent with the government's intertemporal budget constraint.
