= Strategic default =

Intentionally defaulting on a loan by choosing to stop payments

A strategic default is the decision by a borrower to stop making payments (i.e., to default) on a debt, despite having the financial ability to make the payments.

This is particularly associated with residential and commercial mortgages, in which case it usually occurs after a substantial drop in the house's price such that the debt owed is (considerably) greater than the value of the property—the property has negative equity or is underwater—and is expected to remain so for the foreseeable future, such as following the bursting of a real estate bubble. Such borrowers are called walkaways. The process of strategically defaulting on a home mortgage has been colloquially called jingle mail—metaphorically, one mails the keys to the bank.

An alternative is called extend and pretend: The terms of the mortgage are modified to keep the borrower temporarily in the home, in the hope that the market price will improve, and that the house can be sold for the full loan amount at that later date.

== Prevalence post-housing bubble ==
Economists Paul Krugman and Hal Varian argued that strategic default would be an inevitable result of the collapse of the finance and property bubble of the era following 2006. They also noted that this is one of the few ways of freeing people from the burden of mortgage debt. Once free of the mortgage, debtors are free to use their income for other expenditures.

A study in September 2009 from the credit reporting agency Experian and consulting outfit Oliver Wyman estimated that 38% of U.S. involved borrowers were strategically defaulting.

Only a small number of US homeowners default on a mortgage solely because the property is underwater. When a default happens in an underwater home, in 70% of cases, it is due only to difficult life circumstances, such as unemployment or divorce. The remaining defaults are due primarily to a combination of negative life events plus the property value being underwater, and about 6% is due solely to a strategic default.

== Effects ==
Effects vary by jurisdiction; different countries and different states in the United States treat default on mortgage debt differently, notably distinguishing whether it is recourse debt and non-recourse debt, meaning whether the mortgage lender can pursue claims against the defaulted debtor. Further, mortgage refinancing may be treated differently from an original, un-refinanced mortgage, and mortgages on second homes may be treated differently from mortgages on primary residences.

The borrower after deciding to not make payments any more can live free of the costs of payment or rent until the lender forecloses, which may take from several months to years. A borrower may use this time to extinguish or negotiate other debt. Mortgage lenders may negotiate with defaulting borrowers to assure maintenance and occupancy of the property until the lender can take title and market the house, and may provide the defaulting borrower with greater than the minimum legal notice to quit (which can be as little as three days) and may even agree to pay a fee to leave the home in pristine condition.

Foreclosure of the borrower's house will result in a negative entry on the borrower's credit rating, possibly making obtaining loans in the future more difficult or more expensive for the borrower. With otherwise good credit a new mortgage from US government agencies will be denied until 3 (FHA) to 7 years (FNMA) have passed since the actual date of foreclosure.

The difference between the value of the property at the time of foreclosure and the amount of the note (assuming the note is larger) is considered by the IRS as "debt forgiven" and may be considered "income" subject to federal income tax. For a short period ending at the end of December 2012 due to the Mortgage Forgiveness Debt Relief Act of 2007, this "phantom income" was not subject to tax on primary residences.

== Ethical issues ==
Some ethicists have questioned the morality of strategic default, arguing that one has a duty to make payments on debt if one is able. Others argue that there is no such moral duty, a loan being a contract between consenting adults, and noting that financial investors routinely default on non-recourse loans that have negative equity. Some argue further that there is a moral duty to strategically default, and that one should make such decisions based on one's financial interest "unclouded by unnecessary guilt or shame", as lenders who do not modify mortgages do the same, "seek[ing] to maximize profits or minimize losses irrespective of concerns of morality or social responsibility," or more bluntly stating that "The economy is fundamentally amoral." Further, obligations to honor a contract are balanced by obligations to oneself and one's family, the latter speaking in favor of strategic default, some arguing "You need to put yourself and your family's finances first," while one also has obligations to a community, which may be damaged by default.

== Other jurisdictions ==
In Europe, there are generally no pure nonrecourse debts for private persons. Therefore, they need to pay remaining debts even if leaving their houses. Because having a home to sleep in is prioritized, the house mortgage is usually prioritized, while other debts might be abandoned if they cannot be paid.

Strategic bankruptcy of companies is however common in Europe.

== See also ==
- Bank walkaway, opposite situation where bank walks away
- Strategic bankruptcy, corporate analog
