= Debt crisis =

Situation in which a government cannot pay back its debt

A debt crisis is a situation in which a government (nation, state/province, county, or city etc.) loses the ability of paying back its governmental debt. When the expenditures of a government are more than its tax revenues for a prolonged period, the government may enter into a debt crisis. Various forms of governments finance their expenditures primarily by raising money through taxation. When tax revenues are insufficient, the government can make up the difference by issuing debt.

Public debt as a percent of GDP, evolution for USA, Japan and the main EU economies.

Public debt as a percent of GDP by IMF (2024) >100% >75–100% >50–75% >25–50% 0–25% no data

A debt crisis can also refer to a general term for a proliferation of massive public debt relative to tax revenues, especially in reference to Latin American countries during the 1980s, the United States and the European Union since the mid-2000s, and the Chinese debt crises of 2015.

The development charity CAFOD states that in current (2024) conditions, more than 50 countries are in debt crisis.

== Debt wall ==
Hitting the debt wall is a dire financial situation that can occur when a nation depends on foreign debt and/or investment to subsidize their budget and then commercial deficits stop being the recipient of foreign capital flows. The lack of foreign capital flows reduces the demand for the local currency. The increased supply of currency coupled with a decreased demand then causes a significant devaluation of the currency. This hurts the industrial base of the country since it can no longer afford to buy those imported supplies needed for production. Further, any obligations in foreign currency are now significantly more expensive to service both for the government and businesses.

== By region ==
=== Eurozone ===
==== European debt crisis ====
The European debt crisis is a crisis affecting several eurozone countries since the end of 2009. Member states affected by this crisis were unable to repay their government debt or to bail out indebted financial institutions without the assistance of third-parties (namely the International Monetary Fund, European Commission, and the European Central Bank). The causes of the crisis included high-risk lending and borrowing practices, burst real estate bubbles, and hefty deficit spending. As a result, investors have reduced their exposure to European investment products, and the value of the Euro has decreased.

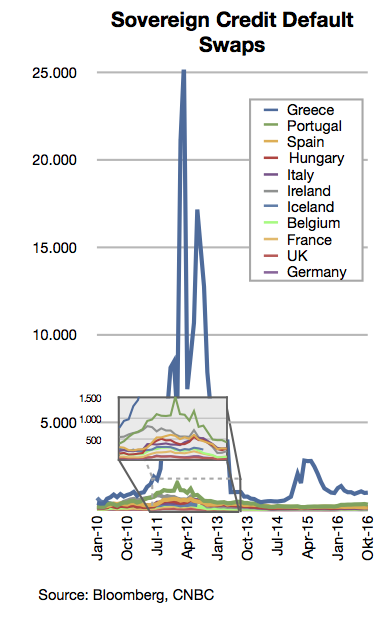
Sovereign CDS showing a temporary loss of confidence in creditworthiness of certain EU countries. The left axis is in basis points; a level of 1,000 means it costs $1 million to protect $10 million of debt for five years.

The 2008 financial crisis began with a crisis in the subprime mortgage market in the United States, and developed into a full-blown international banking crisis with the collapse of the investment bank Lehman Brothers on 15 September 2008. The crisis was nonetheless followed by a global economic downturn, the Great Recession. The European debt crisis, a crisis in the banking system of the European countries using the euro, followed later.

In sovereign debt markets of PIIGS (Portugal, Ireland, Italy, Greece, Spain) created unprecedented funding pressure that spread to the national banks of the euro-zone countries and the European Central Bank (ECB) in 2010. The PIIGS announced strong fiscal reforms and austerity measures, but toward the end of the year, the euro once again suffered from stress.

==== Causes ====
The eurozone crisis resulted from the structural problem of the eurozone and a combination of complex factors, including the globalisation of finance, easy credit conditions during the 2002–2008 period that encouraged high-risk lending and borrowing practices, the 2008 financial crisis, international trade imbalances, real estate bubbles that have since burst; the Great Recession of 2008–2012, fiscal policy choices related to government revenues and expenses, and approaches used by states to bail out troubled banking industries and private bondholders, assuming private debt burdens or socializing losses.

In 1992, members of the European Union signed the Maastricht Treaty, under which they pledged to limit their deficit spending and debt levels. However, in the early 2000s, some EU member states were failing to stay within the confines of the Maastricht criteria and turned to securitising future government revenues to reduce their debts and/or deficits, sidestepping best practice and ignoring international standards. This allowed the sovereigns to mask their deficit and debt levels through a combination of techniques, including inconsistent accounting, off-balance-sheet transactions, and the use of complex currency and credit derivatives structures.

From late 2009 on, after Greece's newly elected, PASOK government stopped masking its true indebtedness and budget deficit, fears of sovereign defaults in certain European states developed in the public, and the government debt of several states was downgraded. The crisis subsequently spread to Ireland and Portugal, while raising concerns about Italy, Spain, and the European banking system, and more fundamental imbalances within the eurozone.

==== Greek debt crisis ====
===== Timeline =====
2009 December - One of the world's three leading rating agencies downgrades Greece's credit rating amid fears the government could default on its ballooning debt. PM Papandrou announces programme of tough public spending cuts.

2010 January–March - Two more rounds of tough austerity measures are announced by government, and government faces mass protests and strikes.

2010 April–May - The deficit was estimated that up to 70% of Greek government bonds were held by foreign investors, primarily banks. After publication of GDP data which showed an intermittent period of recession starting in 2007, credit rating agencies then downgraded Greek bonds to junk status in late April 2010. On 1 May 2010, the Greek government announced a series of austerity measures.

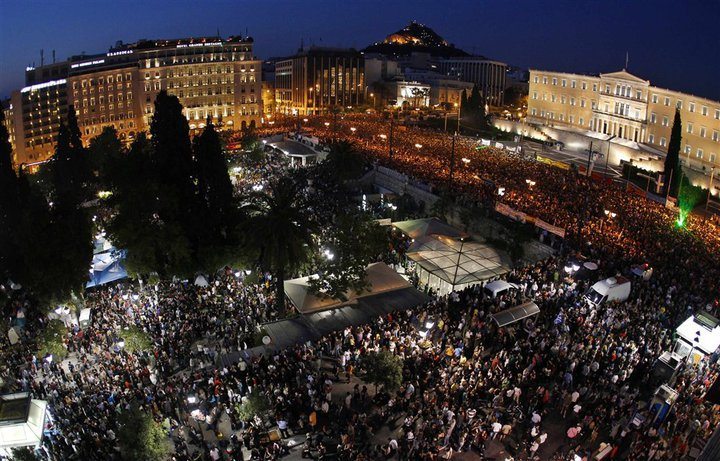
100,000 people protest against the austerity measures in front of parliament building in Athens (29 May 2011).

2011 July – November - The debt crisis deepens. All three main credit ratings agencies cut Greece's to a level associated with substantial risk of default. In November 2011, Greece faced with a storm of criticism over his referendum plan, PM Papandreou withdraws it and then announces his resignation.

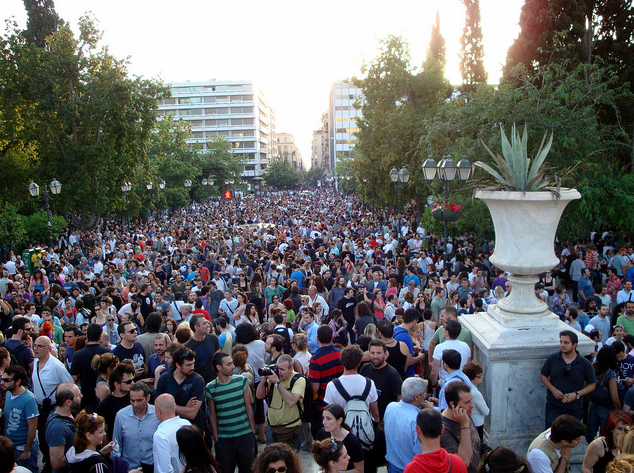
Protests in Athens on 25 May 2011

2012 February - December - The second bailout programme was ratified in February 2012. A total of €240 billion was to be transferred in regular tranches through December 2014. The recession worsened and the government continued to dither over bailout program implementation. In December 2012 the Troika provided Greece with more debt relief, while the IMF extended an extra €8.2bn of loans to be transferred from January 2015 to March 2016.

2014 - In 2014 the outlook for the Greek economy was optimistic. The government predicted a structural surplus in 2014, opening access to the private lending market to the extent that its entire financing gap for 2014 was covered via private bond sales.

2015 June – July - The Greek parliament approved the referendum with no interim bailout agreement. Many Greeks continued to withdraw cash from their accounts fearing that capital controls would soon be invoked. On 13 July, after 17 hours of negotiations, Eurozone leaders reached a provisional agreement on a third bailout programme, substantially the same as their June proposal. Many financial analysts, including the largest private holder of Greek debt, private equity firm manager, Paul Kazarian, found issue with its findings, citing it as a distortion of net debt position.

2017 - The Greek finance ministry reported that the government's debt load is now €226.36 billion after increasing by €2.65 billion in the previous quarter. In June 2017, news reports indicated that the "crushing debt burden" had not been alleviated and that Greece was at the risk of defaulting on some payments.

2018 - Greek successfully exited (as declared) the bailouts on 20 August 2018.

===== Greek debt restructuring =====
The Greek debt restructuring of 2012 is notable in the history of sovereign defaults. It resulted in substantial debt relief and was implemented with relatively limited financial disruption. The process relied on a mix of new legal mechanisms, significant cash incentives, and involvement from the official sector in coordinating creditor participation. At the same time, the timing and structure of the restructuring had important implications. Some aspects of the design may have reduced the overall gains for Greece, set certain precedents, and increased potential risks for taxpayers, particularly due to the favorable treatment of holdout creditors. These factors may influence the complexity of future debt restructurings in Europe.

===== Effects =====
To take considerations that the most characteristic feature of the Greek social landscape in the current crisis is the steep rise in joblessness. The unemployment rate had fluctuated around the 10% mark in the first half of the previous decade. It then began to fall until May 2008, when unemployment figures reached their lowest level for over a decade (325,000 workers or 6.6% of the labour force). While job losses involved an unusually high number of workers, loss of earnings for those still in employment was also significant. Average real gross earnings for employees have lost more ground since the onset of the crisis than they gained in the nine years before that.

In February 2012, it was reported that 20,000 Greeks had been made homeless during the preceding year, and that 20% of shops in the historic city centre of Athens were empty.

- Irish financial crisis
- Portuguese economic crisis

=== Latin America ===
The U.S. foreign policy known as the Roosevelt Corollary asserted that the United States would intervene on behalf of European countries to avoid those countries intervening militarily to press their interests, including repayment of debts. This policy was used to justify interventions in the early 1900s in Venezuela, Cuba, Nicaragua, Haiti, and the Dominican Republic (1916–1924).

=== Argentine debt crisis ===
==== Background ====
Argentina's turbulent economic history: Argentina has a history of chronic economic, monetary and political problems. Economic reforms of the 1990s. In 1989, Carlos Menem became president. After some fumbling, he adopted a free-market approach that reduced the burden of government by privatizing, deregulating, cutting some tax rates, and reforming the state. The centerpiece of Menem's policies was the Convertibility Law, which took effect on 1 April 1991. Argentina's reforms were faster and deeper than any country of the time outside the former communist bloc. Real GDP grew more than 10 percent a year in 1991 and 1992, before slowing to a more normal rate of slightly below 6 percent in 1993 and 1994.

The 1998–2002 Argentine great depression was an economic depression in Argentina, which began in the third quarter of 1998 and lasted until the second quarter of 2002. It almost immediately followed the 1974–1990 Great Depression after a brief period of rapid economic growth.

==== Effects ====
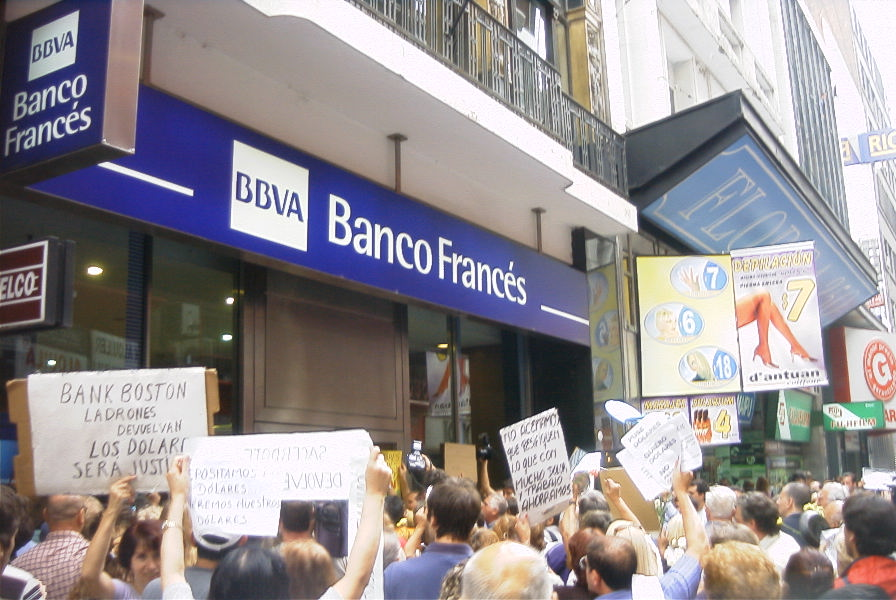
Depositors protest the freezing of their accounts, mostly in dollars. They were converted to pesos at less than half their new value.

Several thousand homeless and jobless Argentines found work as cartoneros, cardboard collectors. An estimate in 2003 had 30,000 to 40,000 people scavenging the streets for cardboard to sell to recycling plants. Such desperate measures were common because of the unemployment rate, nearly 25%.

Argentine agricultural products were rejected in some international markets for fear that they might have been damaged by the chaos. The US Department of Agriculture put restrictions on Argentine food and drug exports.

==== Debt restructuring history ====
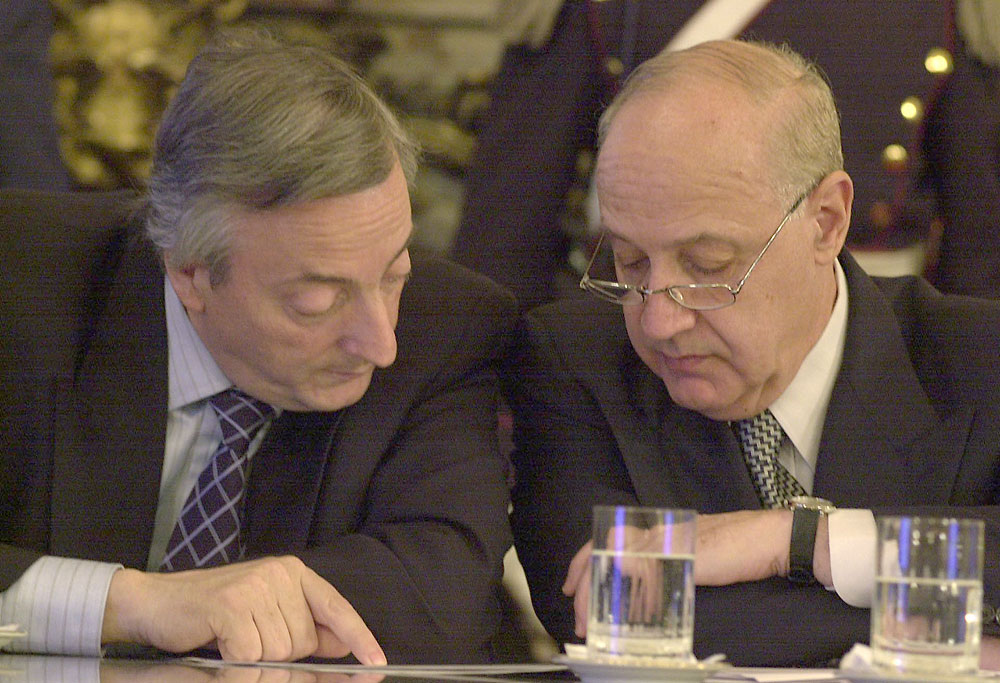
President Néstor Kirchner and Economy Minister Roberto Lavagna, who presented the first debt restructuring offer in 2005

2005 Venezuela was one of the largest single investors in Argentine bonds following these developments, which bought a total of more than $5 billion in restructured Argentine bonds from 2005 to 2007. Between 2001 and 2006, Venezuela was the largest single buyer of Argentina's debt. In 2005 and 2006, Banco Occidental de Descuento and Fondo Común, owned by Venezuelan bankers Victor Vargas Irausquin and Victor Gill Ramirez respectively, bought most of Argentina's outstanding bonds and resold them on to the market. The banks bought $100 million worth of Argentine bonds and resold the bonds for a profit of approximately $17 million. People who criticize Vargas have said that he made a $1 billion "backroom deal" with swaps of Argentine bonds as a sign of his friendship with Chavez. The Financial Times interviewed financial analysts in the United States who said that the banks profited from the resale of the bonds; the Venezuelan government did not profit.

Bondholders who had accepted the 2005 swap (three out of four did so) saw the value of their bonds rise 90% by 2012, and these continued to rise strongly during 2013.

2010 On 15 April 2010, the debt exchange was re-opened to bondholders who rejected the 2005 swap; 67% of these latter accepted the swap, leaving 7% as holdouts. Holdouts continued to put pressure on the government by attempting to seize Argentine assets abroad, and by suing to attach future Argentine payments on restructured debt to receive better treatment than cooperating creditors.

The government reached an agreement in 2005 by which 76% of the defaulted bonds were exchanged for other bonds at a nominal value of 25 to 35% of the original and at longer terms. A second debt restructuring in 2010 brought the percentage of bonds out of default to 93%, but some creditors have still not been paid. Foreign currency denominated debt thus fell as a percentage of GDP from 150% in 2003 to 8.3% in 2013.

=== United States ===
- 2011 United States debt-ceiling crisis
- 2013 United States debt-ceiling crisis
- Puerto Rican government-debt crisis
- 2023 United States debt-ceiling crisis

On 19 January 2023, the United States again reached the debt ceiling. In February 2024, the total federal government debt grew to $34.4 trillion after having grown by approximately $1 trillion in both of two separate 100-day periods since the previous June.

=== Sub-Saharan Africa ===
Sub-Saharan Africa has a long history of external debt, beginning in the 1980s when the public finances of many countries sharply declined following several external shocks. This led to a “lost decade” of low economic growth, increased poverty, food insecurity and socio-political instability. However, the implementation of debt relief under the Heavily Indebted Poor Countries (HIPC) initiative and the supplementary Multilateral Debt Relief Initiative (MDRI) wiped out most of Sub-Saharan Africa’s external debts. These debt relief initiatives substantially reduced nominal public debt to sustainable levels, bringing it from a GDP-weighted average of 104 percent before their implementation to nearly 30 percent during the period from 2006 to 2011. According to World Bank data, the Sub-Saharan African governments' foreign debt tripled between 2009 and 2022. According to IMF (2024), 7 African countries are in debt distress (Republic of the Congo, Ghana, Malawi, Sudan, São Tomé & Príncipe, Zambia and Zimbabwe), and 13 more are at risk of becoming debt distressed. Unlike previous debt crises, the current one is characterised by a shift from multilateral to commercial and bilateral creditors, notably China, and the proliferation of Eurobonds, aggravating debt conditions. Pressured by heavy debt burdens, there is a risk that African governments divert funds from essential sectors such as education, health care and agriculture, causing a vicious cycle of stalled development, food insecurity and an elevated risk of socio-political instability.

== See also ==
- Debt
- Debt of developing countries
- Global debt
- Government debt
- List of countries by credit rating
- List of countries by net international investment position
- List of countries by government debt
- Monetary sovereignty
- Odious debt
- Pensions crisis
- Sovereign default
- State (polity)
- Tax
- Unfunded mandate
