= Complexity economics =

Application of complexity science to economics

Complexity economics, or economic complexity, is the application of complexity science to the problems of economics. It relaxes several common assumptions in economics, including general equilibrium theory. While it does not reject the existence of an equilibrium, it features a non-equilibrium approach and sees such equilibria as a special case and as an emergent property resulting from complex interactions between economic agents. The complexity science approach has also been applied as the primary field in computational economics.

== Models ==
The "nearly archetypal example" is an artificial stock market model created by the Santa Fe Institute in 1989. The model shows two different outcomes, one where "agents do not search much for predictors and there is convergence on a homogeneous rational expectations outcome" and another where "all kinds of technical trading strategies appearing and remaining and periods of bubbles and crashes occurring".

Another area has studied the prisoner's dilemma, such as in a network where agents play amongst their nearest neighbors or a network where the agents can make mistakes from time to time and "evolve strategies". In these models, the results show a system which displays "a pattern of constantly changing distributions of the strategies".

More generally, complexity economics models are often used to study how non-intuitive results at the macro-level of a system can emerge from simple interactions at the micro level. This avoids assumptions of the representative agent method, which attributes outcomes in collective systems as the simple sum of the rational actions of the individuals. It also takes into account the view of emergence in economics.

== Measures ==
=== Economic complexity index ===
Physicist César Hidalgo and Harvard economist Ricardo Hausmann introduced a spectral method to measure the complexity of a country's economy by inferring it from the structure of the network connecting countries to the products that they export. The measure combines information of a country's diversity, which is positively correlated with a country's productive knowledge, with measures of a product ubiquity (number of countries that produce or export the product). This concept, known as the "Product Space", has been further developed by MIT's Observatory of Economic Complexity, and in The Atlas of Economic Complexity in 2011.

==== Relevance ====
The economic complexity index (ECI) introduced by Hidalgo and Hausmann is highly predictive of future GDP per capita growth. In Hausmann, Hidalgo et al., the authors show that the List of countries by future GDP (based on ECI) estimates ability of the ECI to predict future GDP per capita growth is between 5 times and 20 times larger than the World Bank's measure of governance, the World Economic Forum's (WEF) Global Competitiveness Index (GCI) and standard measures of human capital, such as years of schooling and cognitive ability.

=== Metrics for country fitness and product complexity ===
Sapienza physicist Luciano Pietronero and collaborators have recently proposed a different approach. These metrics are defined as the fixed point of non-linear iterative map. Differently from the linear algorithm giving rise to the ECI, this non-linearity is a key point to properly deal with the nested structure of the data. The authors of this alternative formula claim it has several advantages:

- Consistency with the empirical evidence from the export country-product matrix that diversification plays a crucial role in the assessment of the competitiveness of countries. The metrics for countries proposed by Pietronero is indeed extensive with respect to the number of products.
- Non-linear coupling between fitness and complexity required by the nested structure of the country-product matrix. The nested structure implies that the information on the complexity of a product must be bounded by the producers with the slowest fitness.
- Broad and Pareto-like distribution of the metrics.
- Each iteration of the method refines information, does not change the meaning of the iterated variables and does not shrink information.

The metrics for country fitness and product complexity have been used in a report of the Boston Consulting Group on Sweden growth and development perspectives.

== Features ==
Brian Arthur, Steven N. Durlauf, and David A. Lane describe several features of complex systems that they argue deserve greater attention in economics.

1. Dispersed interaction—The economy has interaction between many dispersed, heterogeneous, agents. The action of any given agent depends upon the anticipated actions of other agents and on the aggregate state of the economy.
2. No global controller—Controls are provided by mechanisms of competition and coordination between agents. Economic actions are mediated by legal institutions, assigned roles, and shifting associations. No global entity controls interactions. Traditionally, a fictitious auctioneer has appeared in some mathematical analyses of general equilibrium models, although nobody claimed any descriptive accuracy for such models. Traditionally, many mainstream models have imposed constraints, such as requiring that budgets be balanced, and such constraints are avoided in complexity economics.
3. Cross-cutting hierarchical organization—The economy has many levels of organization and interaction. Units at any given level behaviors, actions, strategies, products typically serve as "building blocks" for constructing units at the next higher level. The overall organization is more than hierarchical, with many sorts of tangling interactions (associations, channels of communication) across levels.
4. Ongoing adaptation—Behaviors, actions, strategies, and products are revised frequently as the individual agents accumulate experience.
5. Novelty niches—Such niches are associated with new markets, new technologies, new behaviors, and new institutions. The very act of filling a niche may provide new niches. The result is ongoing novelty.
6. Out-of-equilibrium dynamics—Because new niches, new potentials, new possibilities, are continually created, the economy functions without attaining any optimum or global equilibrium. Improvements occur regularly.

== Contemporary trends in economics ==
Complexity economics has a complex relation to previous work in economics and other sciences, and to contemporary economics. Complexity-theoretic thinking to understand economic problems has been present since their inception as academic disciplines. Research has shown that no two separate micro-events are completely isolated, and there is a relationship that forms a macroeconomic structure. However, the relationship is not always in one direction; there is a reciprocal influence when feedback is in operation.

Complexity economics has been applied to many fields.

=== Intellectual predecessors ===
Complexity economics draws inspiration from behavioral economics, Austrian economics, Marxian economics, and institutional economics/evolutionary economics. It also draws inspiration from other fields, such as statistical mechanics in physics, and evolutionary biology. Some of the 20th century intellectual background of complexity theory in economics is examined in Alan Marshall (2002) The Unity of Nature, Imperial College Press: London. See Douma & Schreuder (2017) for a non-technical introduction to Complexity Economics and a comparison with other economic theories (as applied to markets and organizations).

=== Applications ===
The theory of complex dynamic systems has been applied in diverse fields in economics and other decision sciences. These applications include capital theory, game theory, the dynamics of opinions among agents composed of multiple selves, and macroeconomics. In voting theory, the methods of symbolic dynamics have been applied by Donald G. Saari. Complexity economics has attracted the attention of historians of economics. Ben Ramalingam's Aid on the Edge of Chaos includes numerous applications of complexity economics that are relevant to foreign aid.

=== Testing ===
In the literature, usually chaotic models are proposed but not calibrated on real data nor tested. However some attempts have been made recently to fill that gap. For instance, chaos could be found in economics by the means of recurrence quantification analysis. In fact, Orlando et al. by the means of the so-called recurrence quantification correlation index were able detect hidden changes in time series. Then, the same technique was employed to detect transitions from laminar (i.e. regular) to turbulent (i.e. chaotic) phases as well as differences between macroeconomic variables and highlight hidden features of economic dynamics. Finally, chaos could help in modeling how economy operate as well as in embedding shocks due to external events such as COVID-19.

For an updated account on the tools and the results obtained by empirically calibrating and testing deterministic chaotic models (e.g. Kaldor-Kalecki, Goodwin, Harrod), see Orlando et al.

=== Complexity economics as mainstream, but non-orthodox ===
According to Colander (2000), Colander, Holt & Rosser (2004), and Davis (2008) contemporary mainstream economics is evolving to be more "eclectic", diverse, and pluralistic. Colander, Holt & Rosser (2004) state that contemporary mainstream economics is "moving away from a strict adherence to the holy trinity – rationality, selfishness, and equilibrium", citing complexity economics along with recursive economics and dynamical systems as contributions to these trends. They classify complexity economics as now mainstream but non-orthodox.

== Criticism ==
In 1995, journalist John Horgan "ridiculed" the movement as being the fourth C among the "failed fads" of "complexity, chaos, catastrophe, and cybernetics". In 1997, however, Horgan wrote that the approach had "created some potent metaphors: the butterfly effect, fractals, artificial life, the edge of chaos, self organized criticality. But they have not told us anything about the world that is both concrete and truly surprising, either in a negative or in a positive sense."

Rosser "granted" Horgan "that it is hard to identify a concrete and surprising discovery (rather than "mere metaphor") that has arisen due to the emergence of complexity analysis" in the discussion journal of the American Economic Association, the Journal of Economic Perspectives. Surveying economic studies based on complexity science, Rosser wrote that the findings, rather than being surprising, confirmed "already-observed facts." Rosser wrote that there has been "little work on empirical techniques for testing dispersed agent complexity models." Nonetheless, Rosser wrote that "there is a strain of common perspective that has been accumulating as the four C's of cybernetics, catastrophe, chaos, and complexity emerged, which may now be reaching a critical mass in terms of influencing the thinking of economists more broadly."

== See also ==
- Agent-based computational economics
- Econophysics
- List of countries by economic complexity
- Complexity theory and organizations
