= DataViva =

- Original author(s): MIT Media Lab; Professor Cesar A. Hidalgo
- Developer(s): Datawheel
- Written in: Python
- License: MIT License
- Website: www.dataviva.info

DataViva is an information visualization engine created by the Strategic Priorities Office of the government of Minas Gerais. DataViva makes official data about exports, industries, locations and occupations available for the entirety of Brazil through eight apps and more than 100 million possible visualizations.

The first set of datum – also available at ALICEWEB – is provided by MDIC (Ministry of Development, Industry and Foreign Trade) / SECEX (Secretariat of Foreign Trade), an official institution of the Government of Brazil and shows foreign trade statistics for all exporting municipalities in the country. The other database, provided by Ministério do Trabalho e Emprego (MTE – Ministry of Labor and Employment), shows information about all the industries and occupations in Brazil (RAIS – Annual Social Information Report).

The platform consists of eight core applications, each of which allows different ways of visualizing the data available. Some applications are descriptive, that is, showing data aggregated at various levels in a simple and comparative way, such as Treemapping. Others are prescriptive, using calculations that allow an analytic visualization of the data, based on theories such as the Product Space. All the applications are generated using D3plus, an open source JavaScript library built on top of D3.js by Alexander Simoes and Dave Landry.

Inspired by The Observatory of Economic Complexity, DataViva is an open data, open-source, and free to use tool.

It was developed in a partnership with Datawheel, co-founded by MIT Media Lab Professor César Hidalgo, and is maintained by the Government of Minas Gerais.
