= Ben Ramalingam =

British researcher and author (born 1975)

- Education: London School of Economics
- Known for: Disaster management, Humanitarian aid, Complexity economics, Adaptive management
- Scientific career
- Workplaces: United Kingdom Humanitarian Innovation Hub OECD; Institute of Development Studies Overseas Development Institute

Ben Ramalingam is a British humanitarian leader, strategist, researcher and author. He is currently leader of the United Nations review of child rights, working with UNICEF and the Office of the Secretary-General of the United Nations. He is also a board member at the Design Council.

He was previously Chief Strategic Development Officer at UNICEF UK and Director of Strategy and Innovation at British Red Cross, senior research associate at the Overseas Development Institute Politics and Governance programme and advisor to the OECD Development Assistance Committee on innovation investments for development, humanitarian and human rights issues.

Ramalingam serves as a board member of the UK Global Grand Challenges Research Fund, a £1.5 billion fund to support cutting-edge research to address the challenges faced by low and middle-income countries. As well as his work at the Overseas Development Institute and the Institute of Development Studies, Ramalingam has advised the Red Cross, United Nations, and many national governments and NGOs.

== Early life ==
Ramalingam grew up in Sri Lanka during the outbreak of the Sri Lankan Civil War, before his family escaped to the United Kingdom.

== Career ==
From 2003 to 2007, Ramalingam was co-director of the Humanitarian Futures Programme, which worked to strengthen the anticipatory and adaptive capabilities of humanitarian organisations. He was then head of research and development at ALNAP, the global learning network for humanitarian responders. Ramalingam recommended, designed, fund-raised for, and co-founded the Humanitarian Innovation Fund, the first ever mechanism for funding innovation in international disaster response, based on his report on the topic published in 2009. He was appointed the founding Chair of the Fund in 2010, a role he fulfilled until 2017 when he stepped down to allow for new leadership.

In 2011 Ramalingam worked on the UK Government's Humanitarian Emergency Response Review and follow-up under the overall leadership of Lord Paddy Ashdown. Ramalingam subsequently authored the UK government's first policy paper on resilience to international crises and disasters. Ramalingam was one of the contributing authors of the IPCC 2012 Special Report on Extreme Events and Disasters, which set out the emerging scientific evidence base for the growing impact of climate change on natural disasters. One of 220 scientists involved, Ramalingam authored the chapter on local adaptation and innovation.

Ramalingam subsequently led a series of reform processes across donors and implementing agencies, emphasising adaptive management as a core competency for improved aid.

Ramalingam was a contributor and editorial board member for both the 2014 UNICEF State of the World's Children on Innovation and the 2016 Red Cross World Disasters Report on Resilience.

In 2016 Ramalingam was lead author and research lead of the UK government report on Frontier Technologies for International Development, with the foreword written by Sir Tim Berners-Lee, founder of the World Wide Web. Ramalingam recommended and subsequently co-designed the Frontier Technologies Livestreaming programme, which won the 2017 UK Civil Service award as the most innovative project in the UK government.

In 2019 Ramalingam designed and implemented the first ever OECD peer learning exercise on innovation for development, leading a process of cross-country learning involving Austria, Australia, Canada, France, Iceland, the Netherlands, Sweden, Switzerland and the United Kingdom. The process and final report were praised by senior leaders from the participating countries for their contribution to improved innovation efforts. This has led to the formation of a new programme of work on innovation within the Development Assistance Committee.

Ramalingam has been involved in a number of initiatives in the global response to the COVID-19 pandemic. This includes leading a multidisciplinary team from the London School of Hygiene and Tropical Medicine, University of Geneva and Liverpool School of Tropical Medicine to undertake frontline research and analysis to create operational guidance for humanitarian responses to COVID-19. This work was referred to by Sir Mark Lowcock, the United Nations Under-Secretary-General for Humanitarian Affairs and Emergency Relief Coordinator as providing "the best available current knowledge on the implications of COVID-19 for humanitarian settings, and a crucial resource for our community." He has also worked with the WHO Special Envoy on COVID-19 Dr David Nabarro, CEO of NHS London Dame Ruth Carnall, Ethiopian Senior Minister Arkebe Oqubuy and other senior leaders on how to strengthen national and global leadership in the pandemic response. Ramalingam was one of 5 authors of the resulting Harvard Business Review guide for decision-makers across public, private and not-for-profit sectors.

== Books ==
- Ramalingam, Ben, Aid on the Edge of Chaos, 2014, Oxford University Press ISBN 978-0199578023

2013 saw the publication and launch of Ramalingam's book Aid on the Edge of Chaos by Oxford University Press The book received endorsements from four Nobel laureates and the heads of the UN and Red Cross, as well as popular media coverage. An Amazon bestseller, it has been used by global development and humanitarian organisations to improve how aid is conceptualised, designed, implemented, and evaluated.

In 2016 Ramalingam worked with the UK National Endowment of Science Technology and the Arts (Nesta (charity)) to produce an edited book on innovation in international development and humanitarian work, bringing together experiences, insights and practical advice from more than 20 organisations and practitioners around the world.

== Awards ==
In 2020, Ramalingam was honoured as a Humanitarian Change Maker of the decade, as one of the ten people or organisations globally that has done most to change international humanitarian responses in the 2010s.
