= 2016 Maryland Democratic presidential primary =

- April 26, 2016

Candidate	Hillary Clinton	Bernie Sanders
Home state	New York	Vermont
Delegate count	60	35
Popular vote	573,242	309,990
Percentage	62.53%	33.81%
- Clinton: 40–50% 50–60% 60–70% 70–80% 80–90% >90% Sanders: 40–50% 50–60% 60–70% 70–80% 80–90% Tie: No votes

The 2016 Maryland Democratic presidential primary was held on April 26 in the U.S. state of Maryland as one of the Democratic Party's primaries ahead of the 2016 presidential election.

The Democratic Party's primaries in Connecticut, Delaware, Pennsylvania and Rhode Island were held the same day, as were Republican primaries in the same five states, including their own Maryland primary.

== Opinion polling ==
Poll source	Date	1st	2nd	3rd	Other
Official Primary results	April 26, 2016	Hillary Clinton; 62.5%	Bernie Sanders; 33.8%		Others / Uncommitted; 3.7%
ARG Margin of error: ± 5.0% Sample size: 400	April 21–24, 2016	Hillary Clinton; 50%	Bernie Sanders; 44%		Others / Undecided; 6%
Monmouth Margin of error: ± 5.7% Sample size: 300	April 18–20, 2016	Hillary Clinton; 57%	Bernie Sanders; 32%		Others / Undecided; 11%
Public Policy Polling Margin of error: ± 4.4% Sample size: 492	April 15–17, 2016	Hillary Clinton; 58%	Bernie Sanders; 33%		Others / Undecided; 9%
NBC 4/Marist Margin of error: ± 3.5% Sample size: 775	April 5–9, 2016	Hillary Clinton; 58%	Bernie Sanders; 36%		Others / Undecided; 6%
University of Maryland/Washington Post Margin of error: ± 5.5% Sample size: 539	March 30 - April 4, 2016	Hillary Clinton; 55%	Bernie Sanders; 40%		Others / Undecided; 5%
Baltimore Sun Margin of error: ± 4.9% Sample size: 400	March 4–8, 2016	Hillary Clinton; 61%	Bernie Sanders; 28%		Others / Undecided; 11%
Gonzales/Arscott Research Margin of error: ± 5.0; Sample size: 411	February 29-March 4, 2016	Hillary Clinton; 57%	Bernie Sanders; 26%		Others / Undecided; 17%
Goucher Margin of error: ± 3.5; Sample size: 794	February 13–18, 2016	Hillary Clinton; 58%	Bernie Sanders; 28%		Others / Undecided; 14%
Baltimore Sun/University of Baltimore Margin of error: ± 5% Sample size: 402	January 11–16, 2016	Hillary Clinton; 40%	Bernie Sanders; 27%		Others / Undecided; 33%

Polls in 2015

Poll source	Date	1st	2nd	3rd	Other
Baltimore Sun/University of Baltimore Margin of error: ± 4.8% Sample size: 419	November 13–17, 2015	Hillary Clinton; 56%	Bernie Sanders; 23%	Martin O'Malley; 7%	Other/Unsure 14%
Washington Post Margin of error: ± 5% Sample size: 490	October 8–11, 2015	Hillary Clinton; 43%	Joe Biden; 26%	Bernie Sanders; 20%	Martin O'Malley 4%, Jim Webb 1%, Lincoln Chafee 0%, None/Any/Other 3%, No Opinion 2%
Goucher Margin of error: ± 5.7% Sample size: 300	September 26 – October 1, 2015	Hillary Clinton; 43%	Joe Biden; 23%	Bernie Sanders; 17%	Martin O'Malley 2%, Jim Webb 2%, Lincoln Chafee 0%, None/Any/Other 2%, Undecided 11%

Polls in 2014

Poll source	Date	1st	2nd	3rd	Other
Washington Post Margin of error: ± 5% Sample size: 538	February 13–16, 2014	Hillary Clinton; 72%	Joe Biden; 9%	Martin O'Malley; 6%	Elizabeth Warren 3%, Andrew Cuomo 2%, None 1%, Undecided 7%
Baltimore Sun Margin of error: ± 4.4% Sample size: 500	February 8–12, 2014	Hillary Clinton; 59%	Joe Biden; 14%	Martin O'Malley; 6%	Andrew Cuomo 4%, Undecided/Other 17%

Polls in 2013

Poll source	Date	1st	2nd	3rd	Other
Washington Post Margin of error: Sample size:	February 21–24, 2013	Hillary Clinton; 56%	Joe Biden; 18%	Martin O'Malley; 8%	Andrew Cuomo 4%, None/other/any of them 4%, No opinion 9%

== Results ==
Maryland Democratic primary, April 26, 2016
Candidate	Popular vote		Estimated delegates		
Candidate	Count	Percentage	Pledged	Unpledged	Total
Hillary Clinton	573,242	62.53%	60	17	77
Bernie Sanders	309,990	33.81%	35	1	36
Rocky De La Fuente	3,582	0.39%	—N/a		
Uncommitted	29,949	3.27%	0	6	6
Total	916,763	100%	95	24	119

=== Results by county ===
Hillary Clinton won every county (and the independent city of Baltimore) with the exceptions of Allegany, Carroll, Cecil, and Garrett counties, which went for Bernie Sanders.

County	Clinton	%	Sanders	%	Others	Totals	Turnout	Margin
Allegany	2,476	41.29%	2,727	45.48%	793	5,996	40.48%	-4.19%
Anne Arundel	37,726	56.19%	26,205	39.03%	3,210	67,141	43.57%	17.16%
Baltimore (City)	87,762	65.26%	42,285	31.44%	4,434	134,481	45.59%	33.82%
Baltimore (County)	77,052	57.24%	50,641	37.62%	6,919	134,612	44.18%	19.62%
Calvert	5,440	57.10%	3,490	36.63%	597	9,527	40.53%	20.47%
Caroline	1,167	50.94%	959	41.86%	165	2,291	33.47%	9.08%
Carroll	7,017	46.00%	7,299	47.85%	938	15,254	46.81%	-1.85%
Cecil	3,534	45.27%	3,562	45.63%	710	7,806	34.84%	-0.36%
Charles	15,685	67.84%	6,623	28.64%	813	23,121	37.58%	39.19%
Dorchester	2,149	61.68%	1,080	31.00%	255	3,484	34.17%	30.68%
Frederick	14,735	51.09%	12,844	44.53%	1,262	28,841	49.09%	6.56%
Garrett	821	41.17%	939	47.09%	234	1,994	44.21%	-5.92%
Harford	13,913	51.21%	11,489	42.29%	1,765	27,167	42.84%	8.92%
Howard	32,139	59.44%	20,316	37.57%	1,619	54,074	54.35%	21.86%
Kent	1,532	54.85%	1,080	38.67%	181	2,793	45.93%	16.18%
Montgomery	122,881	66.25%	59,157	31.89%	3,445	185,483	50.28%	34.36%
Prince George's	120,978	73.60%	40,815	24.83%	2,580	164,373	37.63%	48.77%
Queen Anne's	2,458	53.49%	1,851	40.28%	286	4,595	43.17%	13.21%
Somerset	4,892	52.44%	3,725	39.93%	711	9,328	36.63%	12.51%
St. Mary's	1,207	59.60%	668	32.99%	150	2,025	32.61%	26.62%
Talbot	2,710	60.74%	1,550	34.74%	202	4,462	45.05%	26.00%
Washington	6,211	49.25%	5,189	41.15%	1,210	12,610	39.10%	8.10%
Wicomico	5,543	58.14%	3,410	35.77%	581	9,534	37.09%	22.37%
Worcester	3,214	55.69%	2,086	36.15%	471	5,771	40.08%	19.55%
Total	573,242	62.53%	309,990	33.81%	33,531	916,763	43.90%	28.72%

Note: Maryland is a closed primary state. Turnout is based on registered democrats before the primary on April 26, 2016. Others vote totals consist of votes for Rocky De La Fuente and Uncommitted

== Analysis ==
With its coalition of African Americans and college-educated, affluent white progressive/liberal professionals, Maryland was a state Hillary Clinton was expected to win in the so-called "Acela Primaries" on April 26. She swept the state on election day, winning the primary by 29 points, a clear difference from 2008 when she lost Maryland to Barack Obama. According to exit polls, 43 percent of voters in the Maryland Democratic Primary were white and they opted for Clinton by a margin of 52-42 compared to the 46 percent of African American voters who backed Clinton by a margin of 75–22. Clinton swept all socioeconomic/income classes and educational attainment categories in Maryland as well. She won the votes of people over the age of 45, 75–20, but lost the youth vote to Sanders 52–46. She won both men (55–40) and women (68–29).

In terms of party identification, of the 80 percent of self-identified Democrats who voted in the primary, 69 percent backed Clinton while 30 percent supported Bernie Sanders; Independents, who made up 17 percent of the voters, backed Sanders by a 51–39 margin. Clinton also won all ideological groups.

Clinton performed well in the urban and suburban parts of the state in and around Baltimore (which she won 63–34), and the Washington, D.C. suburbs (which she won 71–27), and she also won in the more rural parts of the state like the Eastern Shore (which she won 57–37) and Western Maryland (which she won 53–47), which includes parts of Appalachia.

== See also ==
- 2016 Maryland Republican presidential primary
