= HFP =

HFP may refer to:

- California Healthy Families Program
- Heptafluoropropane
- Heritage Film Project
- Hexadecimal floating point
- Hexafluoropropylene
- Humanitarian Futures Programme
- Bavarian School of Public Policy (German: Hochschule für Politik, HfP)
- Hands-free profile, a Bluetooth profile
