= USAFacts =

Not-for-profit organization and website

- Type: Not-for-profit organization
- Founded: 2016; 10 years ago
- Founder: Steve Ballmer
- Website: usafacts.org

USAFacts is a not-for-profit organization and website that provides data and reports on the United States population, its government's finances, and government's impact on society. It was launched in 2017.

== History and background ==
USAFacts was founded by former Microsoft CEO and owner of the Los Angeles Clippers, Steve Ballmer. Ballmer invested his own money in the project. USAFacts was launched on April 18, 2017 Tax Day, with the goal of making government data about tax revenues, expenditures, and outcomes more accessible and understandable. USAFacts's platform is designed to provide information to the public about government spending and impact at all levels, from federal to local. It includes information about border apprehensions, climate, immigration, active shooters, medicare, education, military spending and opioids. It also helps entrepreneurs to figure out the best location to launch or invest in businesses.

At launch, the website gathered data from over 70 government agencies and pulls data from more than 130 US government statistical databases and reports. Only official government data is included in the site.

In September 2018, USAFacts launched a new Voter Center. This compares government data with the positions members of Congress state publicly and shares information about education, healthcare, tariffs, jobs, immigration, economy, guns, etc. Partners of the Vote Center are Countable, BallotReady and TurboVote.

In November 2018, USAFacts partnered with GeekWire, to produce the podcast Numbers Geek.

In October 2019, USAFacts linked up with U.S. News & World Report. This provided an outlet to share their data in visual form and in the context of the relevant daily matters to and at the same time increasing U.S. News' 2020 election coverage.

In November 2019, USAFacts in cooperation with AP-Norc, conducted a poll which showed that more than 50% of Americans glean their government-related news from social media, while only 11% would trust its correctness and 64% saw it as untrustworthy information.

During the COVID-19 pandemic, USAFacts launched its USAFacts COVID-19 impact and Recovery Hub. It uses information of government sources, the Bureau of Economic Analysis and the Department of Labor. On March 20, 2020, USAFacts announced its COVID-19 Hub and Map which gave a frequently updated metrics on the daily spread and effect of COVID-19 throughout the U.S.

In 2020, USAFacts partnered with the global nonprofit Earth Day Network.

President Poppy MacDonald testified in front of the United States House Select Committee on the Modernization of Congress in an October 2021 hearing called Strengthening the Lawmaking Process: How Data Can Inform and Improve Policy. She urged the government for datasets that are timely, contextual and relevant to Americans, and talked about the need for more cross-agency and cross-government collaboration.

== Awards and recognition ==
In May 2020, USAFacts won the 2020 Webby Award for Government & Civil Innovation in the category Web.

In August 2021, Fast Company named USAFacts 14th on its third-annual Best Workplaces for Innovators list.

== See also ==
- Analytics.usa.gov – Monitor for website traffic in the US federal government
- Bureau of Justice Statistics – U.S. criminal justice data agency
- Bureau of Labor Statistics – US government agency
- Data.gov – American federal open data platform
- Data USA – American data website
- E-government – Government utilizing electronic services
- Open data – Openly accessible data
- United States Census Bureau – U.S. agency responsible for the census related statistics
- USA.gov – Official web-site portal for the United States government
