= International rankings of Turkey =

These are the international rankings of Turkey.

== Politics and Society ==
Survey	2019 rank	2018 rank	2017 rank	2016 rank	2015 rank	2014 rank
Human Development Index	N/A	▲56	▲64	▲71	▼72	▲69
Legatum Prosperity Index	N/A	▲91	▼93	▼88	▲78	▲86
Index of Economic Freedom	▼71	▼68	▲58	▲60	▼70	69
Democracy Index	110	▼110	▼100	97	▼97	▲98
Corruption Perceptions Index	▼91	▲78	▼81	▼75	▼66	▼64
World Happiness Report	▼79	▼74	▲69	▼78	▼76	N/A

== Economy ==
Survey	2019 rank	2018 rank	2017 rank	2016 rank	2015 rank	2014 rank
Atlas of Economic Complexity.	N/A	▼40	▲36	▼41	▼40	▲38
GDP Nominal	▼19	▼18	17	17	▼16	16
GDP PPP	13	13	13	13	▲13	14
Global Competitiveness Report	61	▼61	▲53	▼55	▼51	▼45
Ease of Doing Business Index	▲33	▲43	▲60	▼69	55	▲55

== Education ==
PISA	2018 rank	2018 score	2015 rank	2015 score	2012 rank	2012 score	2009 rank	2009 score
Mathematics	▲42	▲454	▼49	▼420	▼44	▲448	43	▲445
Science	▲39	▲468	▼52	▼425	43	▲463	▼43	▲454
Reading	▲39	▲466	▼50	▼428	41	▲475	▼41	▲464

== Renewable Energy Rankings in the World ==
Survey	2019 rank	2018 rank	2017 rank	2016 rank	2015 rank	2013 rank	2010 rank	2007 rank
Wind power	12 (8.1 GW)	12 (7.4 GW)	12 (6.5 MW)	▲12 (6.1 GW)	▲15 (4.7 GW)	▲16 (3 GW)	▲17 (1.3 GW)	▲30 (0.07 GW)
Solar power	▼13 (6 GW)	▲12 (5.1 GW)	▲13 (3.4 GW)	▲26 (0.8 GW)	N/A	N/A	N/A	N/A
Geothermal power	4 (1.5 GW)	▲4 (1.2 GW)	10 (0.4 GW)	10 (0.4 GW)	▲10 (0.4 GW)	▲12 (0.2 GW)	▲13 (0.01 MW)	▲16 N/A

== Cities ==
- GaWC Inventory of World Cities, 1999: Istanbul is an Alpha-rank world city

== Economy ==
- Bloomberg's Global Innovation Index 2019, ranked 49 out of 129 countries
- Credit Suisse Global Wealth Report 2019, ranked 27 out of 189 countries
- Global Food Security Index 2017, ranked 41 out of 113 countries
- Observatory of Economic Complexity GDP Growth 2008-2018, ranked 19 out of 196 countries
- World Bank Logistics Performance Index 2018, ranked 47 out of 160
- World Economic Forum Global Enabling Trade Report 2014, ranked 46 out of 138 countries
- World Intellectual Property Organization, Global Innovation Index 2026, ranked 45 out of 139 countries

== Mineral Commodities ==
Mineral Output	Country Ranking
Boron	1 out of 196
Pumice	1 out of 196
Pumicite	1 out of 196
Feldspar	1 out of 196
Magnesium compounds	2 out of 196
Perlite	3 in the world
Bentonite	3 in the world
Chromite ore	4 in the world
Antimony	5 in the world
Cement	5 in the world
Kaolin	7 in the world
Steel	8 in the world
Barite	10 in the world

== Agriculture ==
Agricultural Output	Country Ranking
Almonds	5 out of 196
Apples	3 out of 96
Apricots	1 out of 96
Artichoke	11 out of 32
Barley	8 out of 193
Cherry	1 in the world
Chestnut	2 in the world
Clementine	3 in the world
Cotton	6 out of 94
Cucumber	4 out of 137
Eggplant	4 out of 94
Fig	1 out of 137
Garlic	14 out of 99
Grape	6 out of 94
Hazelnut	1 in the world
Honey	2 in the world
Lemon	6 out of 96
Melon	2 in the world
Milk	7 in the world
Olive	4 in the world
Olive oil	3 in the world
Peach	5 in the world
Pear	5 out of 87
Pistachio	3 in the world
Plum	6 in the world
Potato	16 in the world
Quince	1 in the world
Sour Cherry	1 in the world
Soybean	34 in the world
Spinach	4 in the world
Strawberry	5 in the world
Sugar beet	5 in the world
Tobacco	6 in the world
Tomato	3 out of 94
Walnut	4 in the world
Watermelon	4 in the world

== Environmental ==
- Yale University: Environmental Sustainability Index 2005, ranked 91 out of 146 countries

== See also ==
- Lists of countries
- Lists by country
- List of international rankings
