= Financial fragility =

Financial fragility is the vulnerability of a financial system to a financial crisis. Franklin Allen and Douglas Gale define financial fragility as the degree to which "...small shocks have disproportionately large effects." Roger Lagunoff and Stacey Schreft write, "In macroeconomics, the term "financial fragility" is used...to refer to a financial system's susceptibility to large-scale financial crises caused by small, routine economic shocks." According to the Financial Instability Hypothesis, financial instability unfolds in three stages, wherein prolonged prosperity gradually shifts financing from hedge finance toward speculative and Ponzi finance, making the financial system increasingly fraglie. D'Apice and Ferri associate with an intensification of financial fragility.

== Sources of financial fragility ==
Why does the financial system exhibit fragility in the first place? Why do banks choose to take on a capital structure that makes them vulnerable to financial crises? There are two views of financial fragility which correspond to two views on the origins of financial crises. According to the fundamental equilibrium or business cycle view, financial crises arise from the poor fundamentals of the economy, which make it vulnerable during a time of duress such as a recession. According to the self-fulfilling or sunspot equilibrium view, the economy may always be vulnerable to a financial crisis whose onset may be triggered by some random external event, or simply be the result of herd mentality.

== Self-fulfilling crisis views ==
=== Diamond-Dybvig ===
In the standard Diamond-Dybvig model, financial systems are vulnerable to a financial crisis in the form of a bank run due to the inherent nature of banking. Banks serve as intermediaries between depositors and borrowers. Depositors want immediate access to their deposits, while borrowers are not able to pay on demand. This creates a fundamental fragility, as a bank's assets cannot be liquidated in the event of a crisis to pay all depositors. This tension makes the financial system susceptible to a sudden change in demand for money by depositors, resulting in a bank run.

=== Diamond-Rajan ===
Economists Douglas Diamond and Raghuram Rajan argued that banks purposefully adopt a fragile structure as a commitment device. Under this view, depositors would not normally trust banks with their deposits because they fear that when they want to withdraw their money, the bank may try to avoid repaying, or try to repay at a lower rate. However, if the bank does not have enough liquid assets to cover all depositor claims, a refusal to pay any one depositor the promised amount will prompt all other depositors to try to withdraw as well, and effectively cut off all lending to the bank. Banks voluntarily submit themselves to the risk of a bank run so that depositors will trust them with their loans, since depositors know that the bank will not be able to get away with their money without prompting a run.

=== Lagunoff-Schreft ===
Economists Roger Lagunoff and Stacey Schreft have argued that financial fragility arises from linked portfolios of investors. If investors have linked portfolios such that if one investor withdraws funds the investment will fail and the other investor will also take a loss, then any event that causes investors to change their portfolio could cause others to take losses. If these losses are large enough to prompt further portfolio changes, a small change could initiate a chain reaction of losses. Moreover, Lagunoff and Schreft argue that investors will anticipate the possibility of such a chain reaction, so that the belief that it may happen in the future could cause investors to reallocate their portfolios, thus triggering a self-fulfilling crisis.

== Fundamental crisis views ==
=== Robert Van Order ===
Economist Robert Van Order argued in 2006 that a small change in economic fundamentals can prompt a large change in asset prices and financial structure due to the asymmetric information problem in financial markets. According to Van Order, lenders can choose to make loans to borrowers directly through financial markets such as the stock market, or to operate through a financial intermediary such as a bank. Banks are better able to verify the quality of borrowers, but they charge a fee for their services in the form of lower returns to their depositors then the full returns on the investments. Financial markets allow lenders to circumvent banks and avoid this fee, but they lose the banks ability to verify the quality of borrowers. According to Van Order, a small change in economic fundamentals that made borrowers more nervous about financial markets caused some borrowers to move their savings from financial markets to banks. Such a change would raise the costs of borrowing in financial markets, which could prompt high-quality borrowers to try to get loans from banks rather than financial markets. This could snowball as all the good borrowers stop getting loans from financial markets, prompting lenders to charge still higher rates to those who remain prompting still more borrowers to switch. This process is called an adverse selection spiral, and could lead to the sudden collapse of a financial market. The opposite effect might also occur, leading to a large-scale change in the capital structure in the other direction.

=== Allen-Gale ===
Franklin Allen and Douglas Gale discuss financial fragility as large effects from small shocks. They formalize this idea by considering the case of an economy in which the size of financial shocks approaches zero. They show that even in such an economy there will still be significant fluctuations arising solely from these vanishingly small financial shocks. In their view, banks are risk-sharing institutions where deposits act to insure depositors against a lack of access to money. Even minuscule shocks can set off self-reinforcing price changes.

=== Bailouts ===
Another reason banks might adopt a fragile financial structure is because they expect a government bailout in the event of a financial crisis. This is an example of moral hazard, since the bank engages in risky behavior because it believes it has insurance against downside risks. If the government is considered likely to step in and reduce losses incurred by banks, bankers will have an incentive to take on more risk and increase the financial fragility of the banking system. In general, a bailout is the optimal response of policy-makers once a crisis has occurred (ex post), because the bailout will reduce the negative effects of the crisis on the economy. Before the crisis occurs (ex ante), policy-makers would like to convince banks that they will not bail them out in the event of a crisis so that banks do not adopt a fragile capital structure. However, if policy-makers announce that they will not bail out banks in the event of a crisis, bankers will not believe them because they rationally anticipate that policy-makers will in fact bail them out in the event of a crisis. Policy-makers stated policy of no bailouts in the event of a crisis is not credible, so in the absence of a commitment device banks will take on excess risk.

Moreover, some economists have argued that the presence of bailouts will force banks to take on more risk than they would like. In 2007, Charles Prince the CEO of Citigroup was quoted as saying, "As long as the music is playing, you have to get up and dance." More formally, economists Emmanuel Farhi and Jean Tirole have argued that policy in response to a crisis naturally gives greater benefits to those banks that have taken on more leverage. Given this, banks have an incentive to imitate other banks so that they achieve their worse losses when everyone else does, and thus maximally benefit from the bailout or other policies. This leads banks to adopt a particularly fragile capital structure, so that they all fail together.

== Connection to exchange rate regimes ==
An important aspect of financial fragility of the international system is the connection to exchange rate regimes. Barry Eichengreen and Ricardo Hausmann describe three views on the connection between exchange rate regimes and financial fragility. One view relates to the moral hazard created by the belief of market participants that governments will provide bailouts in the event of a crisis. A pegged exchange rate is a form of implicit guarantee, and leads market participants to expect such bailouts. A second view is that, due to lack of confidence in a country's currency, borrowers in that country seeking financing will not be able to borrow long-term, or borrow from international lenders at all, in that country's own currency. Yet often the returns of the borrower's project will be in the domestic currency. This is a source of financial fragility, because a drop in the exchange rate can cause a debt crisis, as debt denominated in foreign currency becomes much more expensive. A third view holds that the fundamental cause of international financial fragility is a lack of institutions to enforce contracts between parties. This lack of strong contracts makes lenders suspicious of borrowers, and can prompt a crisis should lenders begin to suspect that borrowers will not repay.

== Reducing financial fragility ==
The natural financial fragility of banking systems is seen by many economists as an important justification for financial regulation designed to reduce financial fragility.

=== Circuit breakers ===
Some economists including Joseph Stiglitz have argued for the use of capital controls to act as circuit breakers to prevent crises from spreading from one country to another, a process called financial contagion. Under one proposed system, countries would be divided into groups that would have free capital flows among the group's members, but not between the groups. A system would be put in place such that in the event of a crisis, capital flows out of the affected countries could be cut off automatically in order to isolate the crisis. This system is partly modeled on electrical networks such as power grids, which are typically well-integrated in order to prevent shortages due to unusually high demand for electricity in one part of the network, but that have circuit breakers in place to prevent damage to the network in one part of the grid from causing a blackout throughout all houses connected through the network.

=== Taxing liabilities ===
As described above, many economists believe that financial fragility arises when financial agents such as banks take on too many or too illiquid liabilities relative to the liquidity of their assets. Note that asset liquidity is also a function of the degree of stable funding available to market participants. As a result, the reliance on cheap short term funding creates a negative risk externality (Perotti and Suarez, 2011). Some economists propose that the government tax or limit such liabilities to reduce such excessive risk-taking. Perotti and Suarez (2009) proposed prudential Pigouvian charges on unstable short term funding, while Shin (2010) targets unstable foreign flows. Others have supported this approach.

=== Capital requirements ===
Another form of financial regulation designed to reduce financial fragility is to regulate bank's balance sheets directly via capital requirements. Capital requirements can curb risk shifting in the banking sectors. Turner indicate that bankers may increse the riskiness of bank's asset portfolio without depositors' knowledge, and shareholders' limited liability can stengthen the incentive to do this. So capital requirements could mitigate this problem. Turner also identifiers extended shareholder liability and regulatory constraints as alternative ways to limit risk shifting across the banking system. However Rochet indicates that even adequately capitalized institutions can remain exposed to liquidity risk and the capital rules may fail to capture systemic risk

== See also ==
- Economic bubble
- Systemic risk
- Systemically important financial institution
- Too big to fail
