= 2016 Maryland Republican presidential primary =

- April 26, 2016

38 pledged delegates to the Republican National Convention
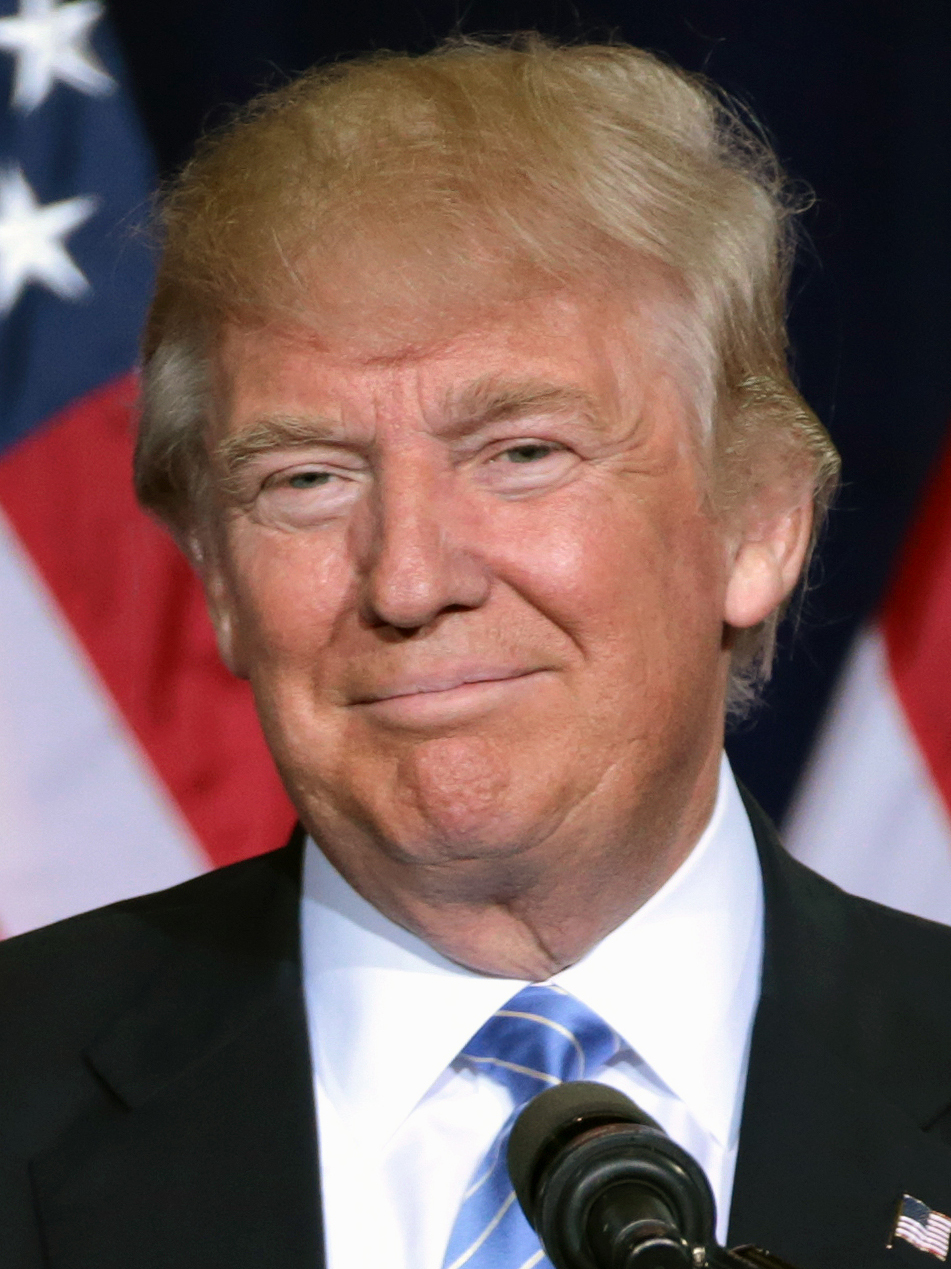

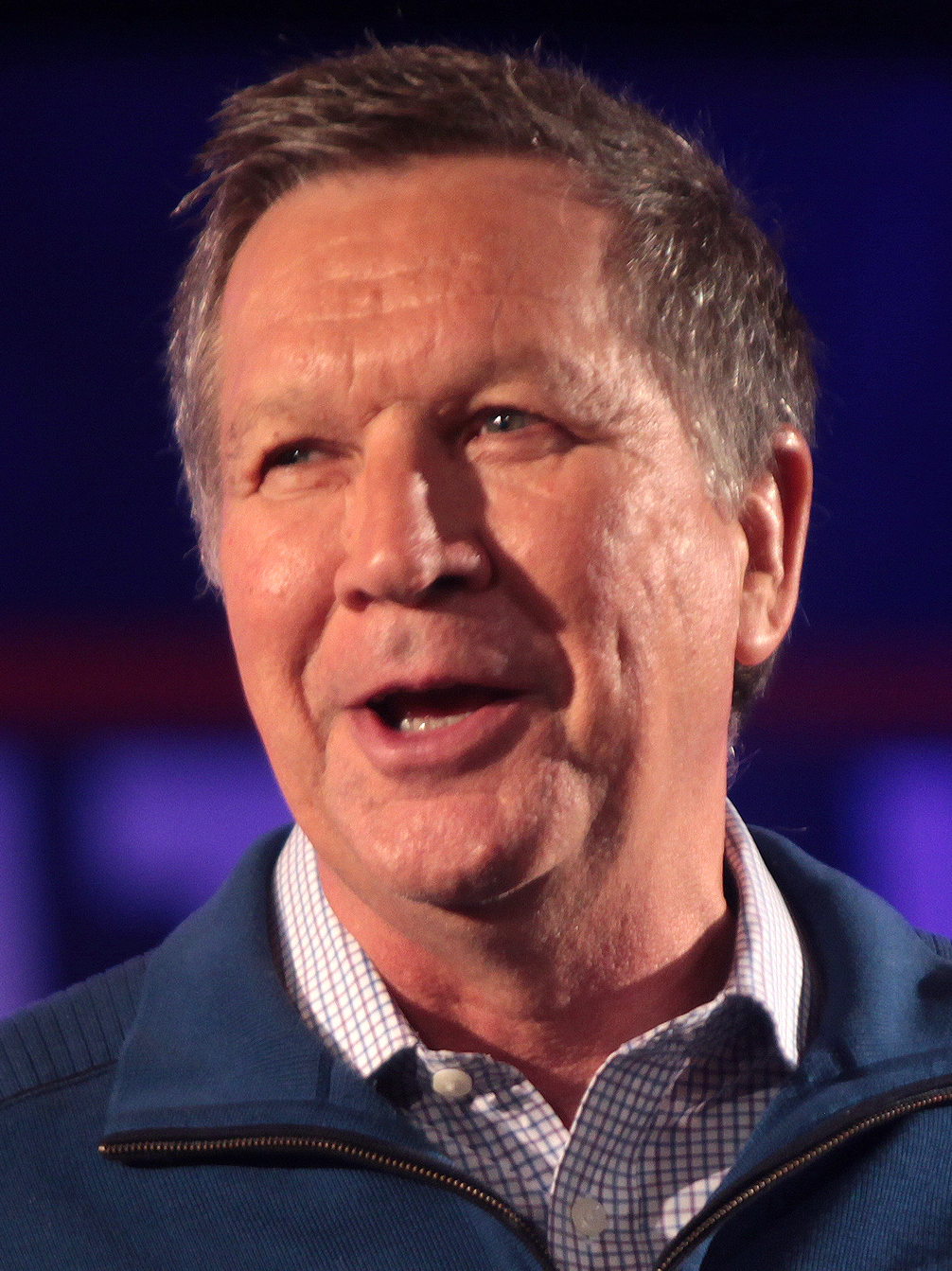

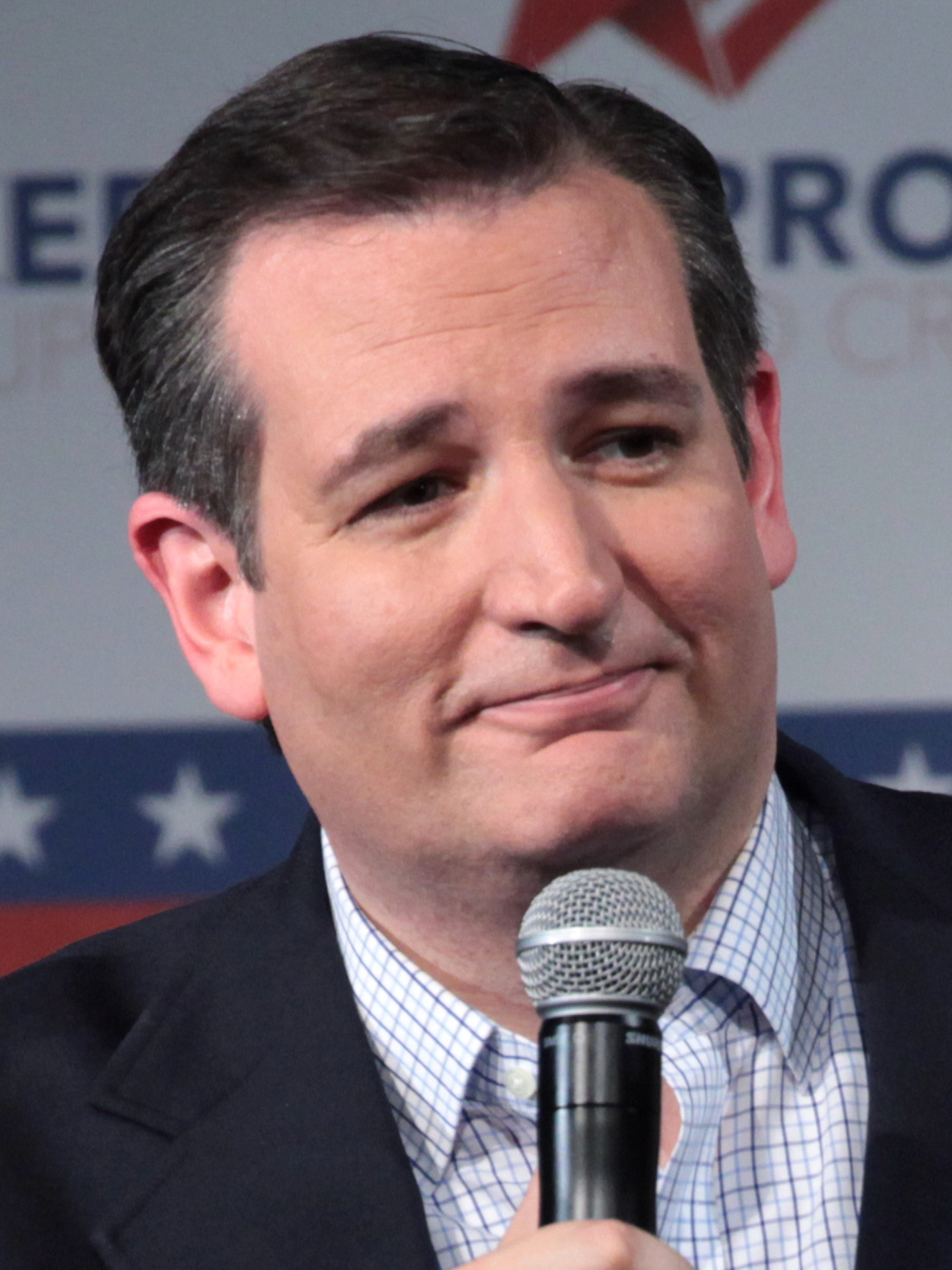
Candidate	Donald Trump	John Kasich	Ted Cruz
Home state	New York	Ohio	Texas
Delegate count	38	0	0
Popular vote	236,623	100,089	82,038
Percentage	54.4%	23.0%	18.9%
County results
Donald Trump
30–40%
40–50%
50–60%
60–70%
70–80%

The 2016 Maryland Republican presidential primary took place on April 26, 2016. The state sent 38 delegates to the 2016 Republican National Convention in Cleveland, of which Donald Trump won all. The Democratic Party held its primary the same day. Donald Trump won nearly every demographic group, some more than others.

== Results ==
=== Vote by county ===
Donald Trump won every county (and the independent city of Baltimore).

County	Trump%	Trump#	Kasich%	Kasich#	Cruz%	Cruz#	Others%	Other#	Totals#
Allegany	64.29%	6,486	12.71%	1,282	18.03%	1,820	4.97%	501	10,089
Anne Arundel	53.55%	32,081	26.63%	15,950	16.47%	9,866	3.35%	2,007	59,904
Baltimore (City)	43.25%	4,186	29.57%	2,862	20.43%	1,977	6.75%	653	9,678
Baltimore (County)	57.73%	38,247	22.93%	15,188	15.99%	10,593	3.35%	2,218	66,246
Calvert	57.89%	6,571	17.61%	1,999	20.54%	2,331	3.96%	449	11,350
Caroline	66.94%	2,590	13.18%	510	17.08%	661	2.79%	108	3,869
Carroll	55.36%	16,942	21.24%	6,501	19.80%	6,060	3.59%	1,098	30,601
Cecil	61.35%	7,557	15.25%	1,879	19.82%	2,442	3.57%	440	12,318
Charles	59.90%	6,440	14.96%	1,608	21.43%	2,304	3.72%	400	10,752
Dorchester	70.85%	2,841	13.82%	554	12.44%	499	2.89%	116	4,010
Frederick	51.08%	16,011	20.71%	6,493	24.61%	7,716	3.60%	1,127	31,347
Garrett	57.41%	3,723	15.20%	986	22.82%	1,480	4.56%	296	6,485
Harford	60.97%	22,376	19.58%	7,187	16.04%	5,887	3.41%	1,253	36,703
Howard	42.18%	12,238	35.50%	10,299	18.88%	5,477	3.44%	997	29,011
Kent	59.61%	1,449	22.75%	533	14.03%	341	4.44%	108	2,431
Montgomery	38.81%	19,689	35.39%	17,953	22.02%	11,168	3.78%	1,920	50,730
Prince George's	42.97%	6,105	25.28%	3,592	25.79%	3,664	5.95%	846	14,207
Queen Anne's	63.93%	5,329	18.51%	1,543	14.78%	1,232	2.78%	232	8,336
Somerset	68.22%	1,747	9.84%	252	18.98%	486	2.97%	76	2,561
St. Mary's	54.92%	6,852	18.31%	2,285	22.43%	2,798	4.34%	542	12,477
Talbot	55.32%	3,253	26.58%	1,563	14.76%	868	3.33%	196	5,880
Washington	60.23%	12,352	13.03%	2,673	22.21%	4,557	4.52%	926	20,508
Wicomico	64.58%	7,214	15.24%	1,702	17.15%	1,916	3.03%	339	11,171
Worcester	72.17%	6,064	14.28%	1,200	11.34%	953	2.20%	185	8,402

== See also ==
- 2016 Maryland Democratic presidential primary
