= Data USA =

American data website

- Original authors: Deloitte, MIT Media Lab – Collective Learning, Datawheel
- Developer: Datawheel
- Release: April 4, 2016; 10 years ago
- Written in: Python, JavaScript, React
- Platform: Web
- Available in: English
- License: AGPL
- Website: datausa.io

Data USA is a free platform that allows users to collect, analyze, and visualize shared U.S. government data. Launched on April 4, 2016, Data USA is the product of an ongoing partnership between Deloitte, Massachusetts Institute of Technology (MIT) Collective Learning Group, and Datawheel.

The platform won a 2017 Webby Award for Government & Civil Innovation, along with a 2016 Kantar Information is Beautiful Award.

On May 1, 2019, version 3.0 of the platform was released, which included a new "Viz Builder" tool, which allows users to build custom data visualizations using data from all of the data sources included on the site. This allows for cross-dimensional queries of the data, which were previously unavailable given the vertical-nature of the profile pages.

Data USA belongs to a larger family of data visualization and distribution platforms, created under the vision of César Hidalgo, which take open data sources that are traditionally siloed and collates them into a single data portal with narrative profiles and data exploration tools. These sites include The Observatory of Economic Complexity (OEC), DataChile, Data Africa, and Data KOREA.

== Architecture ==
=== Back-end ===
Data USA consolidates data from 21 open data sources, cleaned and standardized into a PostgreSQL database, and accessible via a public API. The ETL steps are written in Python, and the API is constructed using Mondrian-REST.

=== Front-end ===
The front-end of Data USA is written in HTML, CSS, and JavaScript, using a React framework called Canon. The codebase, much like the underlying data itself, is made open-source on GitHub under a GNU Affero General Public License v3.0. The visualizations found on Data USA are created using D3plus, a library built on top of D3.js that enables quick visualization development by providing default styles and helper functions and classes.

== See also ==
- USAFacts.org
- United States Census Bureau
