= David A. Lane =

American economist (born 1945)

- Born: David Avra Lane; 1945 (age 80–81)
- Education: University of California, Berkeley, Ph.D.
- Known for: Theory of artifact innovation
- Awards: Fellow of the American Statistical Association (1987)
- Scientific career
- Fields: Economics, Statistics
- Workplaces: Professor, Università degli Studi di Modena e Reggio Emilia
- Thesis: Fields and Martingales (1975)
- Doctoral advisor: Warry Millar

David Avra Lane (born 1945) is an American economist, who developed the theory of artifact innovation. At the Santa Fe Institute he has been defining the notion of economic complexity and the Santa Fe approach. He is professor of economics at the University of Modena and Reggio Emilia and research fellow at the European Centre for Living Technology.

In 1987 he was elected as a Fellow of the American Statistical Association.

== Publications ==
Lane is co-author of the book Foresight, Complexity and Strategy.

Among his most cited papers is "Artificial worlds and economics, part II", published in the Journal of Evolutionary Economics, Volume 3, Number 3 / September 1993 DOI 10.1007/BF01200867, and cited by 218 other works listed in Google Scholar.
