= ALICEWEB =

Brazilian foreign trade website

ALICEWEB is an acronym for Análise de Informações de Comércio Exterior-Web, was the official website of the Brazilian government about their foreign trade statistics. It was made available from 2001 onwards, aiming at easy and clear publication of foreign trade statistics. Access to Aliceweb is free. Users can check the data and choose to generate files containing the results of the queries and have these results emailed to them. The system has Brazilian foreign trade data from 1989 until the most recent month.

It is developed and maintained by the Secretariat of Foreign Trade (SECEX), of the Ministry of Development, Industry and Foreign Trade (MDIC).
