= Aid on the Edge of Chaos =

Book by Ben Ramalingam

- Author: Ben Ramalingam
- Language: English
- Subject: Humanitarian Aid
- Genre: Non-fiction
- Published: 2014
- Publisher: Oxford University Press
- Publication place: UK
- Pages: 480
- ISBN: 9780199578023

Aid on the Edge of Chaos is a 2013 book on applying science and innovation to international development, published by Oxford University Press and written by global development and humanitarian expert Ben Ramalingam.

== Synopsis ==
The book focuses on the need to improve foreign aid and the value of complex systems science and research for how global international aid efforts should be designed, implemented and evaluated.

== Critical reception and influence ==
Described in a leading development journal as 'one of the most lauded contributions to recent mainstream development thinking', Aid on the Edge of Chaos has been endorsed by many top scientists and international leaders, including four Nobel Laureates in Medicine, Economics and Chemistry and the heads of Red Cross and United Nations as well as many NGO leaders. It has been positively reviewed by various press outlets, including The Economist, the Financial Times, The Guardian, New Scientist, Nature, Lancet, Harvard Business Review and the British Medical Journal.

It was also the focus of an interview feature with the author in Huffington Post. Aid on the Edge of Chaos was the subject of a public lecture by Ben Ramalingam at the Royal Society of Arts, London, in December 2013, an event chaired by Geoff Mulgan, CEO of NESTA. The book was discussed by Ramalingam and Sir John Holmes at the Oxford Literary Festival in March 2014, an event chaired by leading British filmmaker and author Bidisha.

Many international aid agencies are applying ideas from the book in their work, including the UK Department for International Development, USAID, the International Rescue Committee, Mercy Corps, UNICEF, World Food Programme, World Vision, the World Bank, the United Nations, and Oxfam.
