= Economic Complexity Index =

Holistic measure of the productive capabilities of large economic systems

Country rankings in the Economic Complexity Index (2015)

The Economic Complexity Index (ECI) is a holistic measure of the productive capabilities of large economic systems, usually cities, regions, or countries. In particular, the ECI looks to explain the knowledge accumulated in a population and which is expressed in the economic activities present in a city, country, or region.

To achieve this goal, the ECI defines the knowledge available in a location, as the average knowledge of the activities present in it, and the knowledge of an activity as the average knowledge of the places where that economic activity is conducted. The product equivalent of the economic complexity index is the product complexity index or PCI. Higher economic complexity as compared to country's income level drives economic development.

== Background ==
The ECI was developed by Cesar A. Hidalgo, from the MIT Media Lab and Ricardo Hausmann, from Harvard University's Kennedy School of Government. ECI data is available in The Observatory of Economic Complexity. The original formulation of the economic complexity index was published in PNAS in 2009.

== Formulation ==
In its strict mathematical definition, the ECI is defined in terms of an eigenvalue of a matrix connecting countries to countries, which is a projection of the matrix connecting countries to the products they export. Since the ECI considers information on the diversity of countries and the ubiquity of products, it is able to produce a measure of economic complexity containing information about both the diversity of a country's exports and their sophistication.

For example, Japan or Germany, with high ECIs, export many goods that are less common and that are produced by highly diversified countries, indicating that these are diverse and sophisticated economies. Countries with low ECI, like Angola or Botswana, export only a few products, which are of relatively high ubiquity and which are exported by countries that are not necessarily very diversified, indicating that these are countries that have little diversity and that the products that they export are not very sophisticated.

== Utility ==
Hidalgo and Hausmann propose the concept of ECI not only as a descriptive measure, but also as a predictive tool for economic growth and income inequality. According to the statistics models presented in their Atlas of Economic Complexity (2011), the ECI is a more accurate predictor of GDP per capita growth than traditional measures of governance, competitiveness (World Economic Forum's Global Competitiveness Index) and human capital, as measured in terms of educational attainment. ECI also shows a strong negative correlation with income inequality, suggesting that more knowledge intense productive structures are more inclusive in terms of income distribution, and providing a statistically more powerful explanation of cross-national variations in income inequality than Kuznets Curve.

Economic development requires the accumulation of productive knowledge and its use in both more and more complex industries. According to this metric, many low-income countries, including Bangladesh, Venezuela, and Angola have failed to diversify their know-how and face low growth prospects while those like India, and the Philippines have added productive capabilities to enter new sectors and are expected by some to drive growth over the coming years.

The Economic Complexity Index was initially developed using trade data but its application has expanded to include other data sources, such as patents and scientific publications, enabling a broader examination of economic and innovation ecosystems.

== Country rankings ==
=== Atlas ===
Economic Complexity Index (Atlas)
Country	Index (2023)	5-year change (2018–2023)	10-year change (2013–2023)
Singapore	2.52	▲4	▲2
Switzerland	2.51	Steady	▼1
Japan	2.43	▼2	▼1
Taiwan	2.24	▲2	▲6
South Korea	2.23	▼2	Steady
Germany	2.01	▼2	▼2
United Kingdom	1.81	▲4	▲4
Ireland	1.72	Steady	▲4
Slovenia	1.69	▲4	▲6
Austria	1.67	▼3	▼3
Czech Republic	1.66	▲1	▼3
Sweden	1.64	▼2	▼6
Hungary	1.60	▼4	▼4
Hong Kong	1.58	▲12	▲17
United States	1.51	Steady	▼2
China	1.47	▲3	▲8
Mexico	1.41	▲3	▲3
Finland	1.41	▼2	▼4
Italy	1.40	▼2	Steady
Israel	1.36	▼6	▼3
Slovakia	1.31	▲4	▼3
Netherlands	1.29	▲1	▲1
France	1.26	▼5	▼7
Denmark	1.19	▼2	▼2
Belgium	1.07	▼4	▼4
Romania	1.04	▲2	▲9
Malaysia	1.03	▲2	Steady
Philippines	0.92	▼4	▲5
Thailand	0.89	▼2	▼3
Estonia	0.85	▲4	▲2
Cyprus	0.73	▲1	▼3
Croatia	0.72	▼2	▼2
Poland	0.71	▼2	▼8
Spain	0.61	▲2	▲2
United Arab Emirates	0.61	▲10	▲28
Lithuania	0.59	▲2	▲8
Portugal	0.57	▲4	▲4
Latvia	0.54	▲4	▲2
Bosnia and Herzegovina	0.53	▲7	▲4
Serbia	0.53	▲3	▲8
Bulgaria	0.46	▼2	▲6
Turkey	0.46	▲7	▲13
Eswatini	0.46	▼8	▲9
India	0.45	Steady	▲13
Jordan	0.44	▼8	▼7
Belarus	0.39	▼6	▼9
Greece	0.36	▲8	▲4
Vietnam	0.35	▲9	▲10
Bahrain	0.34	▲3	Steady
Canada	0.29	▼2	▼8
Tunisia	0.25	▲3	▲2
Norway	0.23	▼1	▼13
Dominican Republic	0.18	▼3	▲3
North Macedonia	0.13	▲12	▲25
Trinidad and Tobago	0.12	▲9	▲23
Armenia	0.11	▲30	▲10
Lebanon	0.09	▼4	▼7
Kyrgyzstan	0.09	▲7	▲2
Costa Rica	0.07	Steady	▼14
Saudi Arabia	0.07	▼13	▼1
Yemen	0.01	▲74	▲70
El Salvador	−0.10	▲7	▲7
Ukraine	−0.10	▼5	▼17
Kuwait	−0.13	▼1	▼2
Colombia	−0.14	▲3	▲7
Oman	−0.15	▲24	▲16
Mali	−0.15	▲56	▲54
New Zealand	−0.18	▲2	▼3
Uruguay	−0.22	▲9	▼2
Uzbekistan	−0.23	▲29	▲33
Egypt	−0.24	▲2	▲5
Indonesia	−0.24	▲2	▼1
Nepal	−0.25	▲3	▲12
Mauritius	−0.27	▲1	▼4
Guatemala	−0.28	▲12	▲8
Moldova	−0.28	▲3	▼15
South Africa	−0.28	▼6	▼13
Iran	−0.29	▲2	▼4
Sri Lanka	−0.30	▲2	▲2
Cambodia	−0.33	▲11	▲18
Burkina Faso	−0.33	▲31	▲42
Albania	−0.34	▲12	▲6
Qatar	−0.35	▼6	▼10
Jamaica	−0.37	▼2	▼7
Gabon	−0.41	▲3	▲26
Argentina	−0.41	▼2	▼6
Kenya	−0.43	▲6	Steady
Chile	−0.44	▼3	▼4
Kazakhstan	−0.44	▲6	▲18
Georgia	−0.50	▼34	▼22
Morocco	−0.50	▲13	▲6
Honduras	−0.51	▼3	▲13
Brazil	−0.52	▼31	▼39
Paraguay	−0.56	▲2	▲8
Azerbaijan	−0.57	▲44	▲38
Laos	−0.58	▲1	▲13
Uganda	−0.63	▲12	▼5
Algeria	−0.65	▲30	▲15
Pakistan	−0.65	▲9	▲7
Russia	−0.66	▼28	▼25
Senegal	−0.73	▲9	▼10
Zambia	−0.75	▼10	▼16
Panama	−0.81	▼70	▼69
Botswana	−0.81	▼3	▼4
Australia	−0.82	▼2	▼6
Côte d'Ivoire	−0.84	▲11	▲14
Ghana	−0.85	▲14	▲1
Namibia	−0.85	▼25	▼19
Togo	−0.87	▲6	▼13
Haiti	−0.88	▲8	▲5
Malawi	−0.88	▼9	▲17
Libya	−0.88	▲18	▲7
Iraq	−0.91	▼46	▲31
Madagascar	−0.91	▲5	▼10
Nicaragua	−0.94	▲5	▲7
Tanzania	−0.95	▼56	▼21
Ethiopia	−0.97	▼12	▲13
Tajikistan	−0.98	▲8	▲23
Myanmar	−0.98	▲6	▲19
Benin	−0.99	▼20	▼6
Liberia	−0.99	▼23	▼5
Rwanda	−1.00	▼9	▼32
Peru	−1.02	▼7	▼29
Niger	−1.03	▼18	▲5
Cuba	−1.06	▼64	▼96
Ecuador	−1.07	▼4	▼2
Angola	−1.07	▲18	Steady
Bangladesh	−1.08	▼4	▼3
Zimbabwe	−1.09	▼18	▼19
Turkmenistan	−1.09	▼16	▼12
Bolivia	−1.10	▼2	▲5
Mauritania	−1.20	▲1	▲11
Venezuela	−1.36	▲4	▼40
Afghanistan	−1.37	▼2	▼17
Mozambique	−1.38	▼4	▼9
Equatorial Guinea	−1.42	▲8	▲3
Cameroon	−1.46	▼10	▼36
Papua New Guinea	−1.50	Steady	▲2
Mongolia	−1.59	▼5	▼4
DR Congo	−1.64	Steady	▼3
Sudan	−1.65	▼5	▼7
Nigeria	−1.74	▲1	Steady
Guinea	−1.74	▼1	▼31
Congo	−1.84	▼37	▼12
Chad	−2.47	▼4	Steady

=== Observatory ===
The OEC rankings uses a 6-digit depth and a HS96 revision.

Economic Complexity Index (Observatory)
Country	Trade Index (2023)	Technology Index (2021)	Research Index (2023)
Japan	2.07	1.00	0.83
Taiwan	2.00	0.66	−0.17
Switzerland	1.96	1.22	1.98
South Korea	1.85	0.73	−0.13
Germany	1.79	1.55	1.68
Singapore	1.62	0.60	0.47
Czech Republic	1.60	1.08	0.26
Austria	1.56	1.50	1.71
Sweden	1.53	1.56	2.04
United States	1.50	0.87	2.52
United Kingdom	1.50	1.09	2.38
Slovenia	1.48	0.83	0.08
Finland	1.46	1.38	1.59
Hungary	1.41	0.79	0.70
Slovakia	1.35	0.40	−0.51
France	1.34	1.24	1.65
Ireland	1.31	0.62	1.92
Italy	1.29	1.34	1.58
Israel	1.28	0.82	1.87
Belgium	1.23	1.08	1.96
China	1.16	0.81	−0.77
Denmark	1.13	1.02	1.79
Hong Kong	1.12	0.66	0.85
Poland	1.09	1.00	0.57
Mexico	1.09	−0.25	0.57
Netherlands	1.08	1.08	2.09
Malaysia	1.04	0.59	−0.40
Romania	1.02	0.49	−0.39
Thailand	0.96	0.54	−0.19
Canada	0.90	1.20	2.25
Spain	0.86	1.23	1.69
Lithuania	0.85	−0.31	−0.18
Belarus	0.81	−0.62	−1.20
Croatia	0.76	0.17	0.28
Serbia	0.76	−0.23	−0.03
Saudi Arabia	0.76	0.98	−0.64
Bosnia and Herzegovina	0.70	−0.07	−1.03
Bulgaria	0.69	0.34	−0.72
India	0.65	1.00	−0.60
Philippines	0.64	−0.36	0.09
Turkey	0.62	1.23	1.13
Portugal	0.57	0.80	0.86
New Zealand	0.48	0.73	1.71
Norway	0.47	1.33	1.68
Lebanon	0.42	−0.88	0.52
Greece	0.40	—	0.66
Ukraine	0.39	0.58	−0.46
Costa Rica	0.34	−0.72	−0.29
Brazil	0.31	1.15	1.29
Russia	0.30	1.08	−0.04
Colombia	0.23	0.53	0.82
Uruguay	0.22	−0.44	0.21
Kuwait	0.21	−1.77	−0.73
United Arab Emirates	0.15	−0.03	−0.05
Georgia	0.13	−0.94	1.00
Tunisia	0.13	−1.10	−0.74
Armenia	0.09	−0.73	−0.80
Iran	0.08	0.10	0.27
South Africa	0.07	0.93	1.16
Vietnam	0.07	0.13	−0.87
Argentina	0.04	−0.10	1.28
Dominican Republic	0.04	−1.25	−0.75
El Salvador	0.00	—	—
Jordan	−0.02	−0.98	−0.05
Indonesia	−0.09	−0.51	0.29
Egypt	−0.11	−0.60	−0.22
Kyrgyzstan	−0.11	—	−0.45
Moldova	−0.13	−0.34	−0.33
Panama	−0.14	0.09	0.26
Jamaica	−0.14	—	−0.07
Kazakhstan	−0.18	−0.20	−1.14
Chile	−0.20	0.86	1.26
Guatemala	−0.21	—	0.40
Uzbekistan	−0.22	−0.86	−1.34
Australia	−0.28	1.11	2.12
Oman	−0.32	−1.38	−0.77
Albania	−0.33	—	−1.23
Qatar	−0.33	−1.01	0.11
Morocco	−0.36	−0.24	−0.84
Botswana	−0.41	—	−1.16
Paraguay	−0.42	—	0.36
Cuba	−0.42	−2.12	−1.00
Benin	−0.43	—	−0.74
Azerbaijan	−0.43	−1.08	−1.55
Sri Lanka	−0.44	−0.62	−0.67
Kenya	−0.47	−1.52	0.53
Senegal	−0.51	−1.36	−0.71
Honduras	−0.53	—	−0.26
Pakistan	−0.55	−1.21	−0.68
Peru	−0.61	0.18	0.06
Uganda	−0.62	−1.32	0.41
Gabon	−0.62	—	−0.66
Niger	−0.63	—	—
Zambia	−0.65	—	−0.44
Cambodia	−0.66	—	−0.62
Turkmenistan	−0.69	—	—
Iraq	−0.71	—	−0.99
Namibia	−0.74	—	−0.41
Algeria	−0.75	−0.85	−1.14
Venezuela	−0.82	−1.51	−0.76
Ethiopia	−0.84	—	0.08
Libya	−0.84	−1.07	−1.26
Togo	−0.85	—	—
Ecuador	−0.85	−0.87	−0.20
Bolivia	−0.85	—	−0.75
Tajikistan	−0.89	—	—
Laos	−0.89	—	−0.51
Myanmar	−0.91	—	−1.00
Ghana	−0.97	—	0.47
Zimbabwe	−0.98	—	−0.28
Nicaragua	−1.00	—	—
Yemen	−1.00	—	−1.12
Bangladesh	−1.03	−1.35	−0.30
Côte d'Ivoire	−1.08	—	−0.84
Mauritania	−1.13	—	—
Tanzania	−1.13	—	0.15
Madagascar	−1.15	—	−0.63
Afghanistan	−1.19	—	−1.40
Cameroon	−1.20	—	−0.67
Angola	−1.23	—	—
Sudan	−1.24	−1.32	−0.90
Mozambique	−1.27	—	−0.48
Mongolia	−1.32	−1.74	−0.57
Burkina Faso	−1.36	—	−0.56
Mali	−1.41	—	−0.69
Liberia	−1.44	—	−0.71
Papua New Guinea	−1.63	—	−0.79
Congo	−1.73	—	−0.51
Nigeria	−1.75	−1.94	0.14
DR Congo	−1.94	—	−0.25
Guinea	−2.18	—	−0.50
Chad	−2.41	—	—
Malawi	—	—	−0.06
Sierra Leone	—	—	−0.61
Syria	—	—	−1.44
North Korea	—	—	−1.71

== See also ==
- Complex system
- Econophysics
- List of countries by economic complexity
