= Humanitarian Futures Programme =

English research programme

Coordinates: 51.5114°N 0.1185°W

The Humanitarian Futures Programme (HFP) was initiated in 2004 at King's College, London, as an action research programme in the School of Social Science and Public Policy. HFP has provided futures-oriented reports, studies, evaluations and organizational methodologies and “tools,” to identify, monitor and mitigate ever more complex humanitarian threats.

HFP has worked with a wide range of social and natural scientists, representatives of governments, international and non-governmental organisations, as well as with the private sector to develop means for those with humanitarian roles and responsibilities to meet the challenges of exponentially increasing disasters and emergencies.

The programme director is Dr. Randolph Kent, a former UN Humanitarian Coordinator.

This mission has continued since 2017 as Humanitarian Futures (HF) The strategic and operational objectives and tools provided by HF can apply equally to any sector or organisation concerned with forward thinking, or planning from the future.

== Programme Areas ==
HF focuses on four programme areas:

Programme Area 1: Future vulnerabilities - New risks, new solutions. HF analyses the changing nature of humanitarian crises based on the assumption that they are not aberrant phenomena but reflections of the ways that societies are structured and allocate resources. This assumption underpins wide-ranging speculative analyses about the humanitarian consequences of the changing nature of human agency, human space and governance systems.

Programme Area 2: Planning from the future – Enhanced approaches for identifying, monitoring and mitigating ever more complex humanitarian threats. HF demonstrates ways for humanitarian actors to be more anticipatory, adaptive, collaborative and innovative in dealing with future threats, and explains the importance of planning from the future for leaders of the future.

Programme Area 3: Diverse actors, diverse engagement. Exponentially increasing humanitarian threats will impact upon the interests of more and more organisations, systems and networks around the world. The third programme area assesses the implications of this emerging reality and provides ways that diverse actors, such as the military, private sector and social networks become humanitarian actors for reasons of mutual self-interest.

Programme Area 4: Tools and methodologies. Organisations need means to test their existing capacities for dealing with the challenges of the future and means to prepare now to deal with such challenges. HF provides guides and tests to enable a wide range of organisations to assess their respective capacities and to enhance their futures capacities, if required.

== Key Findings, Tools and Library ==
Humanitarian Futures (HF) Key Findings section provides reports, studies, assessment tools and methodologies that have immediate relevance for those wishing to plan from the future for the future. The section’s principal focus is on effective approaches for anticipation, adaptation, innovation, collaboration and leadership in a humanitarian futures context. It is supplemented by an extensive library that reenforces the importance of those themes.
