= TurboVote =

American voter registration website

- Headquarters: New York City
- Location: United States
- Services: Voter registration and information
- CEO: Luis Lozada
- Parent organization: Democracy Works
- Website: https://turbovote.org

TurboVote is an American non-profit website that seeks to increase voter turnout by helping its users register to vote, find polling places, and research election issues. Its parent company, Democracy Works, was co-founded by Kathryn Peters and Seth Flaxman in 2010.

== History ==
TurboVote was first piloted at Boston University during the 2010 midterm elections.

TurboVote's parent company, Democracy Works, is a 501(c)(3) non-profit organization. Its donors include the Knight Foundation, which has given US$5.15 million since 2012.

As of 2019, TurboVote has 51 employees and is based out of its Brooklyn, New York City office.

Luis Lozada was hired as CEO in 2022 after previously serving as General Counsel for two years.

== Services and partnerships ==
TurboVote's services include helping voters register to vote and apply for absentee or mail-in ballots and sending text and email reminders about elections. Its services are available in English and Spanish.

TurboVote has partnered with more than three hundred institutions of higher education, non-profit organizations, and companies to register more than ten million voters. Some partners sponsor mailings, allowing TurboVote to send legal paperwork to voters by mail.

Democracy Works' partners have included Google, Snapchat, Twitter, Microsoft, Amazon, reddit, WordPress, Tumblr, BuzzFeed with Barack Obama, Spotify, Starbucks, Airbnb, Target, Uber, Instagram, and Lady Gaga.

In 2022, Democracy Works and TurboVote supported more than 1,500 elections and distributed more than 54 million election notifications. The TurboVote tool was overhauled to expand its capabilities, allowing voters to check their registration status, pledge to register to vote once they turn 18, find their polling location, make plans to vote in person or by mail, and even contact their local election office.

== Controversies ==
In 2018, TurboVote texted its users in Boone County, Missouri outdated information based on the polling station locations from four years prior. After the county clerk's office contacted TurboVote, they texted correct information to the affected voters.

In 2018, scammers posed as employees of TurboVote, phoning prospective voters in Georgia and Washington in search of personal information and money.

In 2019, the National Association of Secretaries of State claimed that TurboVote has periodically failed to process voter registrations, like on September 25, 2018, National Voter Registration Day, when their website crashed.
