= Latin American and Caribbean Economic Association =

The Latin American and Caribbean Economic Association (LACEA) is an international association of economists with common research interests in Latin America. It was founded in July 1992, to encourage professional interaction and foster increased dialogue among researchers and practitioners whose work focuses on the economies of Latin America and the Caribbean. Since 1996, its Annual Meetings bring together scholars, practitioners and students to discuss research papers and listen to invited keynote speakers who present the latest academic findings in economic and social development issues. LACEA fosters several thematic research networks, publishes the academic journal Economia, and administers the digital repository LACER-LACEA.

== Objectives ==
The objectives of the Latin American and Caribbean Economic Association are:

- To encourage research and teaching related to the economies of Latin American and Caribbean countries and to foster dialogue among researchers and practitioners whose work focuses on the economies of the region. As a matter of policy, LACEA welcomes economists of all nationalities, theoretical orientations and policy perspectives.
- To encourage interaction among scholars, teachers and policy-makers residing and working in Latin America and the Caribbean and professionals residing outside the region.
- To sponsor programs, meetings, conferences and other opportunities for scholarly exchange among individuals and organizations concerned with the economies of Latin American and Caribbean nations. In this capacity, LACEA can act both independently and as a member of other professional or nonprofit associations.

== History ==
=== Beginnings ===
The Latin American and Caribbean Economic Association (LACEA), or Asociación de Economía de América Latina y el Caribe, was founded in July 1992 in order to encourage greater professional interaction and foster increased dialogue among researchers and practitioners who focus their work on the economies of Latin America and the Caribbean. The idea of creating such an association of economists was first put into action during the April 1991 Washington, DC meetings of the Latin American Studies Association by Michael Conroy, then a professor of economics at the University of Texas at Austin. At a meeting attended by close to forty participants, a seven-member Organizing Committee, led by Nora Lustig, was appointed. The Organizing Committee quickly obtained enthusiastic support for the idea of creating an association from a dozen leading scholars in the field, including Albert Hirschman, Eliana Cardoso, John Williamson, and Albert Fishlow. This early support was critical to the success of the efforts to create LACEA. Soon after, the Organizing Committee identified the initial Executive Committee, drafted the association’s bylaws, and applied for membership of the Allied Social Science Associations (ASSA), officially launching LACEA. Over one hundred prominent economists from throughout the region were invited and accepted the invitation to be charter members of LACEA. The first Executive Committee was selected and Albert Fishlow, then professor at the University of California, Berkeley was invited to become the first President of LACEA. Nora Lustig, then at the Brookings Institution, was selected as Vice-President, and Darryl McLeod, professor at Fordham University, was invited to become the Treasurer of the association. The other members of the Executive Committee were: Edmar Bacha, Carlos Bazdresch, Guillermo Calvo, Michael Conroy, Vittorio Corbo, Carmen Diana Deere, Sebastian Edwards, Raul Feliz, Daniel Heymann, Ricardo Hausmann, Patricio Meller, and John Welch. On July 1, 1994 the charter members officially approved LACEA's Bylaws and its first Executive Committee.

In January, 1993, under Albert Fishlow’s presidency (1993–97) LACEA became a member of the Allied Social Science Associations and soon began to host sessions at the annual meetings of the American Economics Association, the Latin American Studies Association and the Latin Amean Meetings of the Econometric Society.

In 1996, LACEA began to host annual international meetings of its own. The first meeting was hosted by ITAM, in Mexico City, and featured 157 papers and over 200 participants. The 1997 meeting was held in Bogotá, Colombia and was co-organized by Fedesarrollo and Universidad de los Andes. At this meeting, close to 250 participants attended and 208 papers were presented. Ever since, the meetings have taken place annually (see the Lacea's Annual Meeting section above), attracting larger numbers of participants and papers. On average since 2010, 560 economists have attended LACEA's meetings, and 280 papers have been presented during the three-day conference.

Under Nora Lustig’s presidency (1998–99), LACEA expanded its activities in several directions. In conjunction with the Inter-American Development Bank and the World Bank, it created the Network on Inequality and Poverty in 1998. It also started the Network on Political Economy and a series of seminars on International Economics and Finance, a joint initiative with the Center for International Economics at the University of Maryland. All these activities were carried out in conjunction with academic centers in Latin America and the Caribbean. In 1999, at the Fourth Annual Meetings in Santiago, LACEA announced the launching of a new academic Journal, Economia. Professor Andres Velasco was appointed as Editor of the journal, which was modeled on the Brookings Papers on Economic Activity and Economic Policy. The first issue was released in 2000. Another significant event in 1999 was the awarding of a major grant to LACEA from the Development Grant Facility of the World Bank (later transformed into the Global Development Network), which gave support to the annual meetings, the research networks, and the journal.

Since 2000, Professors Fishlow and Lustig have played many influential roles in the Association, most importantly as advisers to the presidents and the Executive Committee, and as goodwill ambassadors of the Association before other international organizations and academic institutions. In recognition of their contributions, the title of President Emeritus was awarded to Professors Fishlow and Lustig at the 2017 Lacea meeting in Buenos Aires (November 9–11).

=== Development of meetings and networks ===
Subsequent presidents have expanded the activities of the Association in many directions. Under Guillermo Calvo's presidency (2000–01) LACEA started to explore holding annual meetings outside the region. Negotiations started in 2000 with CEMFI, Spain, and came to fruition under Sebastian Edwards's presidency (2002–03). Thus, the 2002 meeting took place in Madrid, hosted by CEMFI, attracting researchers and scholars from Europe and broadening the LACEA network outside the region. Similarly, the 2005 meeting was held in Paris, under Mariano Tomassi’s presidency (2004–05), and hosted by the American University in Paris. More recently, efforts have been made to hold the meetings in cities other than capitals of countries. Medellín (Colombia) in 2010 under Ricardo Hausmann’s presidency (2010–11) and again in 2016 under Eduardo Lora’s presidency (2016–17) hosted the meetings, organized by Eafit. Similarly, Santa Cruz de la Sierra (Bolivia) was the venue of the 2015 meeting under Eduardo Engel’s presidency (2014–15), organized by the Bolivian Society of Economists (SEBOL), the Institute for Advanced Development Studies (INESAD) and the Private University of Santa Cruz de la Sierra (UPSA). These efforts have substantially enlarged the membership of the Association and strengthened its relations with a wider net of academic institutions within the region. In the same vein, it is expected that the 2018 meeting will take place in Guayaquil, hosted by Escuela Superior Politécnica del Litoral (ESPOL), under Santiago Levy’s presidency (2018–19).

Since 2006, under Andrés Velasco’s presidency (2006–07), the annual meetings have been jointly organized with the Latin American Chapter of the Econometric Society (LAMES). The joint LACEA-LAMES conference is currently regarded as one of the most prestigious gatherings of academic economists in the developing world, not just in Latin America.

In addition to the annual meetings, LACEA holds a variety of specialized meetings, a practice initiated by its first presidents and continued by Sebastian Edwards with the Inter-American Seminar on Economics and by subsequent presidents. In parallel, the number of specialized networks has grown to eight, currently covering the following areas: Inequality and Poverty; Political Economy; Trade, Integration and Growth; Impact Evaluation; Finance; Crime; Labor and Economic History. A new network on Health Economics was created in late 2017 and will have its first meeting in 2018.

=== Research dissemination and academic awards ===
The Economía Journal of the LACEA has been published since its launch in 2000. Major reorganizations were made under Roberto Rigobón’s presidency (2012-13), when the reviewing process through bi-annual panel meetings was substituted by standard peer reviewing (keeping the panel meetings for discussion purposes), and in 2017 under editor Carlos Vegh, when the bi-annual call for submissions was replaced by online rolling submissions. The following have been editors: Andrés Velasco, Eduardo Engel, Francisco Ferreira, Roberto Rigobón, Rodrigo Soares, Ugo Panizza, Raquel Bernal, Marcela Eslava, Sergio Urzúa, Julián Messina and Alexander Monge-Naranjo. Economía is today one of the most prominent outlets for research on Latin America. It is currently ranked 71st among nearly 2000 journals worldwide evaluated by RePec and undergoing an accreditation process.

Other channels of research dissemination administered by LACEA include the internet site Vox.LACEA, created under Mauricio Cárdenas’ presidency (2008–09), and the Latin American and Caribbean Economic Repository, LACER, created under Roberto Rigobón’s (2012-13). Máximo Rossi is currently the editor of Vox.LACEA and LACER.

A new dissemination channel was added to this list: the LACEA Working Paper Series (LACEA.WPS), which was launched at the Buenos Aires meeting. Established researchers based on Latin America or with ties to LACEA, who have an outstanding record of publications in top journals, will become LACEA Associates and will have the exclusive right to publish their (not yet peer-reviewed) research in the LACEA Working Paper Series. The first Editor-in-chief of LACEA.WPS is Irene Brambilla.

In order to encourage high-quality research and recognize talented scholars’ contributions, several awards have been established. The Carlos Díaz-Alejandro Prize, created in 1998, has been awarded every two years to outstanding scholars who have made significant contributions to economic policy issues of especial relevance to the region. Edmar Bacha, Arnold Harberger, Rudiger Dornbusch, Guillermo Calvo, Jere Behrman, Hugo Hopenhayn, Sebastian Edwards, Carmen Reinhart and Orazio Attanasio have been recipients of this distinction.

Under Ricardo Hausmann’s presidency (2010-11), the Juan Luis Londoño Prize was created to encourage research in social policy issues. Francois Bourguignon was the first recipient of the Prize. It is currently awarded every two years to the best paper on social issues presented at the LACEA meeting by a young researcher.

=== Governance evolution ===
The foundational Bylaws approved in 1998 have served the organization well, with only one revision in 2015 introduced during Eduardo Engel’s presidency, by which a system of permanent committees was established and the responsibilities of the Executive Committee members and of some of the leading administrative positions were redefined. Also under Eduardo Engel, a protocol was signed with the Latin American Chapter of the Econometric Society (LAMES) in order to clarify the terms of collaboration between the two associations for the organization of the joint LACEA-LAMES meetings.

Every two years, the active members of the Association have voted to elect the new Vice-President (who becomes the President after two years) and six new members of the Executive Committee (who serve for four years). Seven of the 12 members of the current Executive Committee (2016-2017) are women, as well as the next Vice-President (2018-19) and President (2020-21), Raquel Fernández.

Since the presidency of Mauricio Cárdenas (2008-09), the Secretariat of LACEA is hosted at Fedesarrollo in Bogotá. The current Executive Secretary is Ana María Díaz, assisted by Elena Zadic. Executive Secretaries have been crucial for the success of the organization.

Years	Name	Nationality
1996-1997	Albert Fishlow	United States of America
1998-1999	Nora Lustig	Argentina
2000-2001	Guillermo Calvo	Argentina; United States of America
2002-2003	Sebastian Edwards	Chile
2004-2005	Mariano Tomassi	Argentina
2006-2007	Andrés Velasco	Chile
2008-2009	Mauricio Cárdenas	Colombia
2010-2011	Ricardo Hausmann	Venezuela
2012-2013	Roberto Rigobón	Venezuela
2014-2015	Eduardo Engel	Chile
2016-2017	Eduardo Lora	Colombia
2018-2019	es:Santiago Levy Algazi (elected)	Mexico

== Administration structure ==
LACEA is governed by an Executive Committee consisting of fourteen voting members: the President, the Vice-President, and twelve Directors-at-large. The past President, the Secretary and the Treasurer are ex-officio members of the Executive Committee, with no voting rights. Every two years, the active members of the Association vote for the new Vice-President (who becomes the President after two years) and for six new members of the Executive Committee (who serve for four years).

== Annual meetings ==
LACEA's Annual Meeting is the annual academic conference of the Association. It is organized in cooperation with a local organization or institution.
The main goal of these meetings is to encourage the debate on relevant economic issues for the region, where leading scholars, academics, policy makers, international financial institutions’ officials and economists from the private sector participate actively. On average since 2010, 560 economists have attended LACEA's meetings, and 280 papers have been presented during the three-day conference.

Year	City/Country	Hosting Institution
1996	Mexico City, Mexico	ITAM
1997	Bogota, Colombia	Fedesarrollo; Universidad de los Andes
1998	Buenos Aires, Argentina	Universidad Torcuato Di Tella
1999	Santiago, Chile	Instituto de Economía de la Pontificia Universidad Católica de Chile; Centro de Economía Aplicada de la Universidad de Chile
2000	Rio de Janeiro, Brazil	PUC-Rio
2001	Montevideo, Uruguay	FCS-UDELAR; CERES; Universidad ORT
2002	Madrid, Spain	CEMFI
2003	Cholula, Puebla, México	Universidad de las Américas Puebla
2004	San Jose, Costa Rica	Universidad de Costa Rica
2005	Paris, France	The American University of Paris
2006	Mexico City, Mexico	Instituto Tecnológico Autónomo de México
2007	Bogota, Colombia	Fedesarrollo; Universidad de los Andes
2008	Rio de Janeiro, Brazil	Instituto Nacional De Matemática Pura E Aplicada (IMPA)
2009	Buenos Aires, Argentina	Universidad Torcuato Di Tella
2010	Medellin, Colombia	Banco de la Republica; Centro de Pensamiento Social de Proantioquia; Universidad EAFIT; Universidad de Antioquia
2011	Santiago, Chile	Universidad Adolfo Ibáñez (UAI)
2012	Lima, Peru	Universidad del Pacifico (UP)
2013	Mexico City, Mexico	El Colegio de México
2014	São Paulo, Brazil	University of São Paulo
2015	Santa Cruz, Bolivia	Bolivian Society of Economists (SEBOL); The Institute for Advanced Development Studies (INESAD); University of Santa Cruz de la Sierra (UPSA)
2016	Medellin, Colombia	Universidad EAFIT; Banco de la República Colombia

== Sponsors ==
The Association is financed mainly from voluntary contributions from international organizations, like the Inter-American Development Bank, and the World Bank, CAF – Development Bank of Latin America and the Caribbean, the International Monetary Fund, and (until 2015) the Global Development Network.

== Networks ==
To help promote the interaction of young and seasoned economists, as well as social scientists and development practitioners, LACEA sponsors eight research networks: the Network on Inequality and Poverty (NIP); the Political Economy Group (PEG); the Trade, Integration and Growth Network (TIGN); the Impact Evaluation Network (IEN); the Workshop on International Economics and Finance (IE&F); the Labor Network (LN); the America Latina Crime and Policy Network (AL CAPONE); and the Economic History Network.

== Journal ==
Economia is the academic journal of the Association, published since 2000 twice a year by the Brooking Press. It contains peer-reviewed research papers and reviews covering a range of topics in applied and empirical economics. Economia also organizes a session during the Annual Meetings, where a selection of published papers is presented and discussed. In addition to LACEA's main institutional donors, Yale University, Universidad de los Andes, and the David Rockefeller Center for Latin American Studies at Harvard University have supported Economia.

The following have been Editors and Associate Editors of Economia (with their affiliation at the time):

Years	Editors
2002	Eduardo Engel (Yale University); Raquel Fernandez (London School of Economics); Francisco Ferreira (World Bank) pt:Ilan Goldfajn (Central Bank of Brazil); Jose de Gregorio (Central Bank of Chile); Florencio López de Silanes (Yale University); Nora Lustig (Universidad de las Américas Puebla); Carmen Pagés-Serra (IDB); Roberto Rigobón (MIT); Roberto Steiner (IMF); Andrés Velasco (Harvard University)
2003	Rafael di Tella (Harvard University); Eduardo Engel (Yale University); Francisco Ferreira (World Bank); Nora Lustig (Universidad de las Américas Puebla); Carmen Pagés-Serra (IDB); Roberto Rigobón (MIT); Andrés Rodriguez-Clare (IDB); Roberto Steiner (IMF); Andrés Velasco (Harvard University)
2004	Rafael di Tella (Harvard University); Eduardo Engel (Yale University); Francisco Ferreira (World Bank); Carmen Pagés-Serra (IDB); Roberto Rigobón (MIT); Andrés Rodriguez-Clare (IDB); Roberto Steiner (IMF); Miguel Urquiola (Columbia University); Andrés Velasco (Harvard University)
2005	Rafael di Tella (Harvard University); Eduardo Engel (Yale University); Francisco Ferreira (World Bank); Carmen Pagés-Serra (IDB); Roberto Rigobón (MIT); Andrés Rodriguez-Clare (IDB); Roberto Steiner (IMF); Miguel Urquiola (Columbia University); Andrés Velasco (Harvard University)
2006	Eduardo Engel (Yale University); Francisco Ferreira (World Bank); Roberto Rigobón (MIT)
2007	Eduardo Engel (Yale University); Francisco Ferreira (World Bank); Roberto Rigobón (MIT)
2008	Roberto Rigobón (MIT)
2009	Roberto Rigobón (MIT)
2010	Raquel Bernal (Universidad de los Andes); Ugo Panizza (The Graduate InstituteGeneva); Roberto Rigobón (MIT); Rodrigo Soares (PUC-Rio)
2011	Raquel Bernal (Universidad de los Andes); Ugo Panizza (The Graduate Institute of International and Development Studies); Roberto Rigobón (MIT); Rodrigo Soares (PUC-Rio)
2012	Raquel Bernal (Universidad de los Andes); Marcela Eslava (Universidad de los Andes); Ugo Panizza (The Graduate Institute of International and Development Studies); Roberto Rigobón (MIT)
2013	Raquel Bernal (Universidad de los Andes); Marcela Eslava (Universidad de los Andes); Ugo Panizza (The Graduate Institute of International and Development Studies); Roberto Rigobón (MIT)
2014	Raquel Bernal (Universidad de los Andes); Marcela Eslava (Universidad de los Andes); Ugo Panizza (The Graduate Institute of International and Development Studies); Roberto Rigobón (MIT)
2015	Raquel Bernal (Universidad de los Andes); Marcela Eslava (Universidad de los Andes); Ugo Panizza (The Graduate Institute of International and Development Studies); Roberto Rigobón (MIT)
2016	Carlos Vegh, Chief Editor, (Johns Hopkins University); Raquel Bernal (Universidad de los Andes); Marcela Eslava (Universidad de los Andes); Julian Messina Granovsky (IDB); Alexander Monge-Naranjo (Federal Reserve Bank of St. Louis); Ugo Panizza (The Graduate Institute of International and Development Studies); Sergio Urzúa (University of Maryland)

== LACER-LACEA repository ==
LACER-LACEA digital repository is a network that provides access to other repositories containing books, reports, journals, working papers and databases on Latin American economic and related topics, produced for public use by international organizations and academic institutions. The LACER-LACEA digital repository supports optimal discoverability and re-usability of the content by complying with Dublin Core and the Open Archives Initiative Protocol for Metadata Harvesting.

== Vox.LACEA ==
Vox.LACEA is an online resource center to promote the dissemination of research-based policy analysis, academic articles, interviews, debates and teaching materials. The intended audience is economists of all levels of experience working at governments, international organizations, academia and the private sector.

== LACEA's awards ==
=== Carlos Diaz-Alejandro Prize ===
LACEA's Diaz-Alejandro Prize is designed to honor the memory and contribution of Carlos Federico Diaz-Alejandro (1938-1985), the most prominent Latin American economist of his generation, and to encourage high quality research on economic issues relevant to Latin America. The prize is awarded to an individual who has made a significant contribution or a body of contributions to the economic analysis of issues relevant to Latin America.
The recipients of the Diaz-Alejandro Prize have been:

Year	Name	Affiliation
1998	Edmar Bacha	Pontificial Catholic University of Rio de Janeiro
2000	Arnold Harberger	UCLA University of Chicago
2002	Rudiger Dornbusch	MIT
2006	Guillermo Calvo	Columbia University
2008	Jere Behrman	University of Pennsylvania
2010	Hugo Hopenhayn	UCLA
2012	Sebastian Edwards	UCLA
2014	Carmen Reinhart	Harvard Kennedy School
2016	Orazio Attanasio	University College London
2018	James Robinson	University of Chicago (Harris School for Public Policy)
2020	Carlos A. Vegh	Johns Hopkins University

=== Juan Luis Londoño Prize ===
LACEA's Londoño Prize is designed to honor the memory and contribution of Juan Luis Londoño (1958-2003) a Colombian economist committed to improving social policies, and to encourage high quality and policy-relevant research on socioeconomic issues in Latin America and the Caribbean. The prize is awarded every two years to the best paper on social issues presented at the Annual Meeting of the Association.

== Legal status ==
On December 3, 1996, LACEA was incorporated under section 402 of the New York Not-for-profit Corporation Law as Type A Education Not-for-Profit Corporation in the State of New York. On August 2, 1999 was recognized by the U.S. Internal Revenue Service as a tax-exempt nonprofit corporation under Section 501(a) of the Internal Revenue Code as an organization described in section 501(c)(3).

In 2015, LACEA registered the following at the United States Patent and Trademark Office: its name and logo, for association services, namely promoting the interests of economic researchers and economists whose work focuses on the economies of the Latin America and the Caribbean; and the Economia Journal, for journals in the field of economics and public policy featuring topics related to Latin America and articles by Latin American economists.
