= Ugo Panizza =

Italian economist

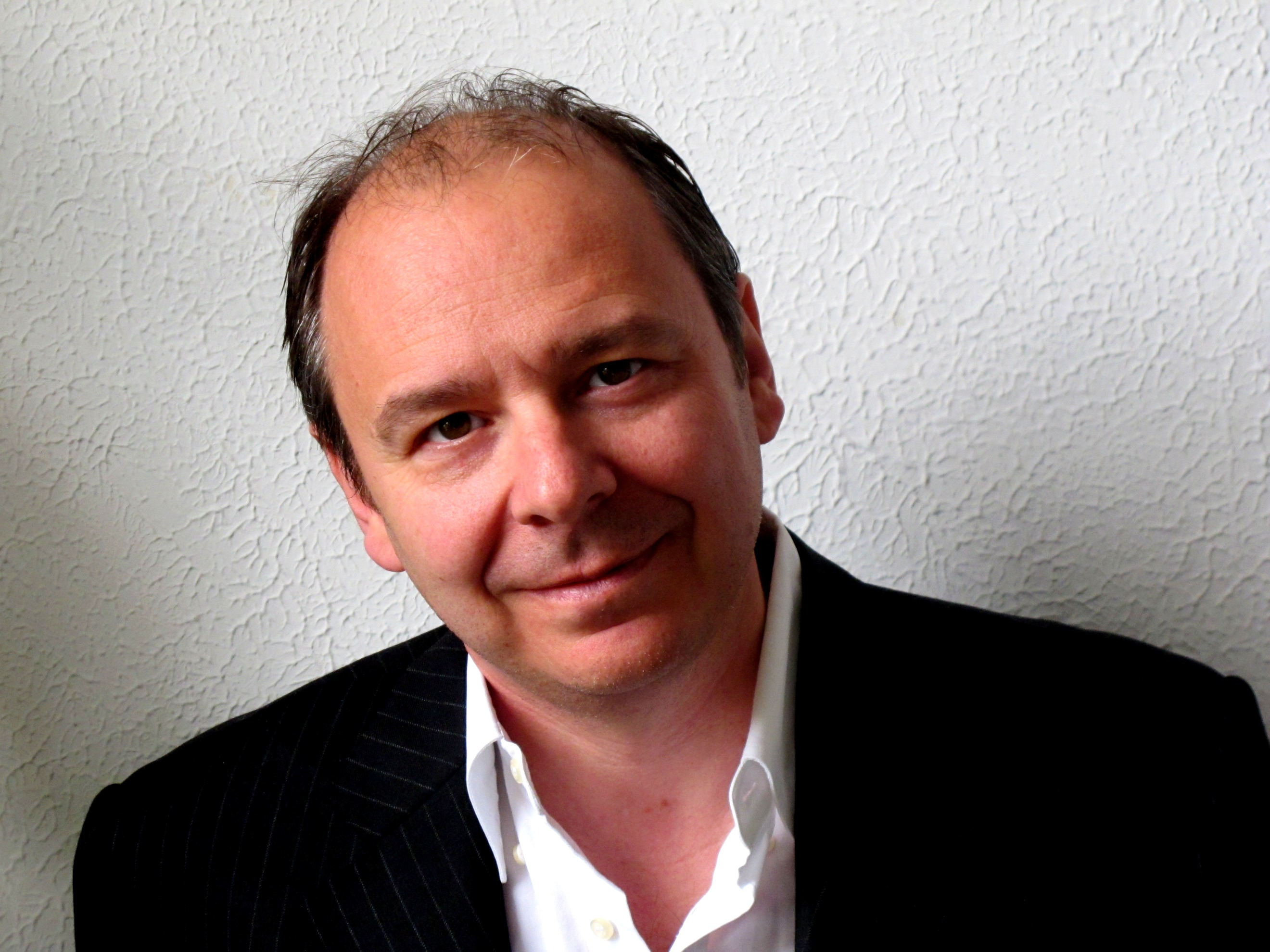

Academic background
- Education: Johns Hopkins University University of Turin
- Influences: Barry Eichengreen, Ricardo Hausmann

Academic work
- Discipline: Development economics, International Finance, Sovereign debt, Sovereign default
- Institutions: Graduate Institute of International and Development Studies, Geneva
- Notable ideas: Original sin (economics), Too Much Finance
- Website: Information at IDEAS / RePEc

Ugo Panizza is an Italian and Swiss economist. He is a professor of International Economics, department head, and Pictet Chair in Finance and Development at the Graduate Institute of International and Development Studies in Geneva. He is a vice-president of the Centre for Economic Policy Research (CEPR), the director of the International Center for Monetary and Banking Studies, the editor in chief of Oxford Open Economics and International Development Policy, and the deputy director of the Centre for Finance and Development. He is a members of the Scientific Committees of the Fondazione Luigi Einaudi (Torino) and Long-term Investors@UniTo.

== Diplomas ==
Panizza holds a PhD in economics from the Johns Hopkins University (his studies were financed by the Istituto Bancario San Paolo di Torino through a Luciano Jona Scholarship) and a Laurea (BA) from the University of Turin.

== Contributions ==
Panizza is known for co-establishing the concept of original sin in development economics, alongside economists Barry Eichengreen and Ricardo Hausmann. His work on the costs of sovereign default (joint with Eduardo Borensztein, Eduardo Levy Yeyati, Federico Sturzenegger, and Jeromin Zettelmeyer), on the links between finance and economic development (joint with Jean Louis Arcand and Enrico Berkes), and on the relationship between public debt and economic growth (joint with Andrea Presbitero) has been widely cited in the international press.

In 2012 Panizza coauthored (with Jean-Louis Arcand and Enrico Berkes) an IMF working paper titled Too Much Finance showing that the relationship between financial development and economic growth goes from being positive to negative when the financial sector becomes too large.

In 2016 he coauthored a paper with Barry Eichengreen titled "A Surplus of Ambitions". The paper concludes that Europe's crisis countries are unlikely to be able to run primary budget surpluses as large and persistent as officially projected.

He has contributed to the debate on Quantitative Easing in Europe and on the monetary and fiscal stimulus in the Eurozone. In 2017 he coauthored with David Miles, Ricardo Reis, and Angel Ubide the 19th Geneva Report on the World Economy titled And Yet It Moves. The report asks why inflation has remained so stable in the aftermath of the Great Recession.

In 2017 he co-authored (with Jeromin Zettelmeyer and Eike Kreplin) a Peterson Institute working paper aimed at assessing debt sustainability in Greece and contributed (with Jeromin Zettelmeyer, Beatrice Weder di Mauro, Charles Wyplosz, Richard Portes, Miguel Poiares Maduro, Barry Eichengreen, and Emilios Avgouleas) to the CEPR Independent Report on the Greek Official Debt. He also studied (with Patrick Bolton and Mitu Gulati) the spillovers of the Greek Retrofit on other peripheral European economies.

He contributed to the debate on Odious debt, focusing on both Haiti and Venezuela. He wrote a Project Syndicate piece with Ricardo Hausmann discussing the possibility of creating an odiousness rating system and worked with Mitu Gulati on Venezuela's Hunger Bonds. His work on Haiti (coauthored with Mitu Gulati, Kim Oosterlinck, and Mark Weidemaier) focuses on the Independence Debt a series of US loans to suppress the slave revolt that led to Haiti's independence.

During the COVID-19 pandemic, he coauthored (with Patrick Bolton, Lee Buchheit, Pierre-Olivier Gourinchas, Mitu Gulati, Chang-Tai Hsie, and Beatrice Weder di Mauro) a policy paper which described a mechanism to implement a debt standstill for emerging and developing economies affected by the pandemic. Successive work with Patrick Bolton and Mitu Gulati discussed options to provide temporary legal protection to the debtor countries in a scenario in which multiple sovereign debtors move into default territory.

In 2023 he co-authored (with Ricardo Hausmann, Carmen Reinhart and a team at the Harvard Growth Lab) a policy paper with a plan for the economic recovery of Lebanon.

== Career ==
He has taught at the University of Turin and at the American University of Beirut. He also worked at the World Bank, the Inter-American Development Bank, and at the United Nations Conference on Trade and Development (UNCTAD) where he was the head of the Debt and Finance Analysis Unit. Currently Panizza is professor of International Economics and Pictet Chair in Finance and Development at the Graduate Institute of International and Development Studies in Geneva, where he is also the head of the Department of International Economics and the deputy director of the Centre for Finance and Development. Panizza is a CEPR Research Fellow, and a former editor of Economia (the Journal of Latin American and Caribbean Economic Association, LACEA). He is a member of the editorial board of several other academic journals.
