= Bastiaan Quast =

Dutch-Swiss economist and data scientist

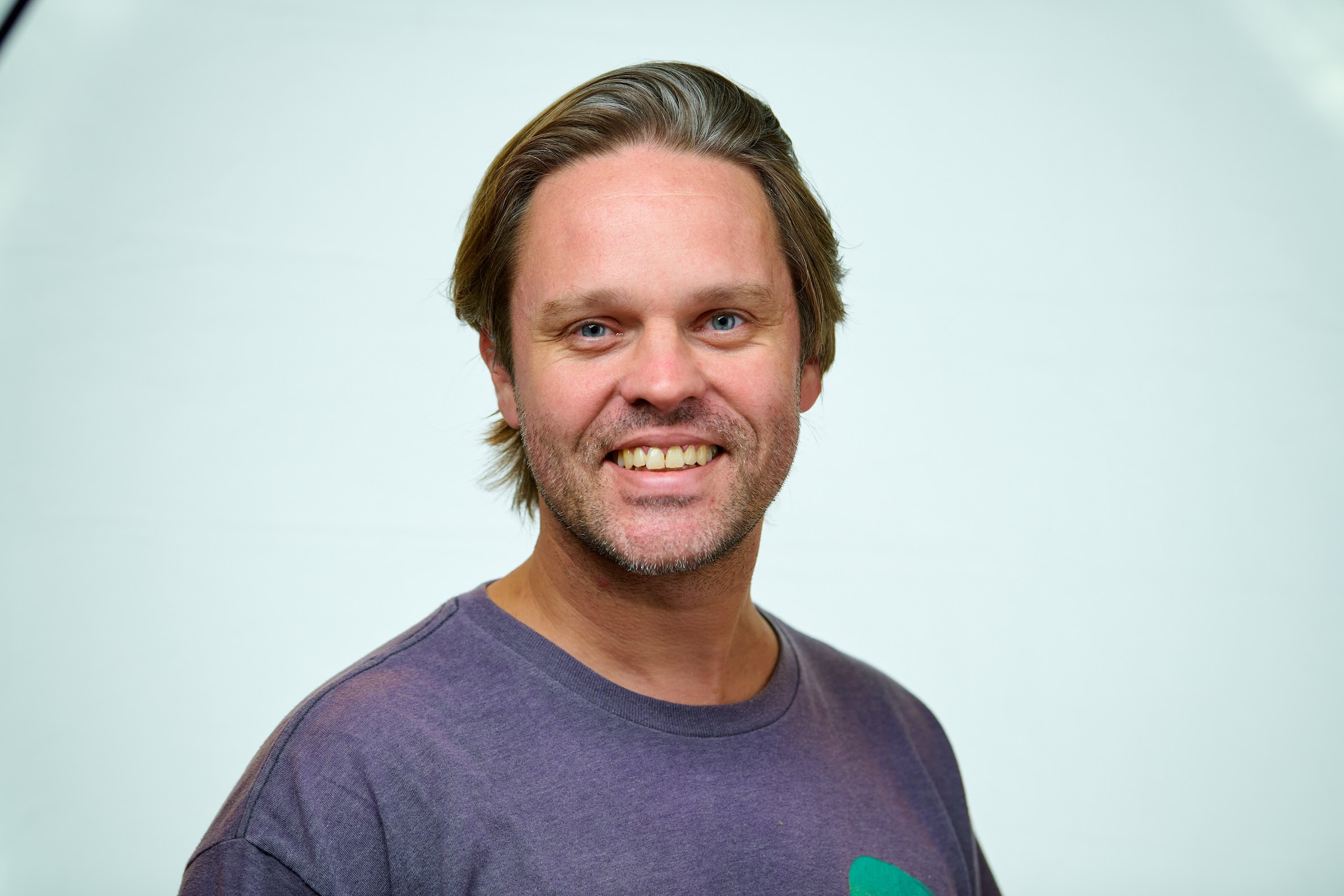
- Bastiaan Quast at Stanford in 2024
- Citizenship: Netherlands
- Known for: Rnn (software)
- Scientific career
- Workplaces: United Nations (ITU)
- Doctoral advisor: Richard Baldwin, Jean-Louis Arcand
- Website: bastiaanquast.com

Bastiaan Quast is a Dutch-Swiss machine learning researcher. He is the author and lead maintainer of the open-source rnn and transformer deep-learning frameworks in the R programming language, and the datasets.load GUI package, as well as R packages on Global Value Chain decomposition & WIOD and on Regression Discontinuity Design. Quast is a great-great-grandson of the Nobel Peace Prize laureate Tobias Asser.

== Early life and education ==
Bastiaan Quast graduated from University of Groningen with a bachelor's degree in Economics and bachelor's degree in Theoretical philosophy. He holds a master's degree in Econometrics from the University of St. Gallen He obtained his Ph.D from the Graduate Institute of International and Development Studies with advisors Richard Baldwin and Jean-Louis Arcand, his work on local languages and internet usage was discussed at the 2017 G20 meeting in Germany.

== Career ==
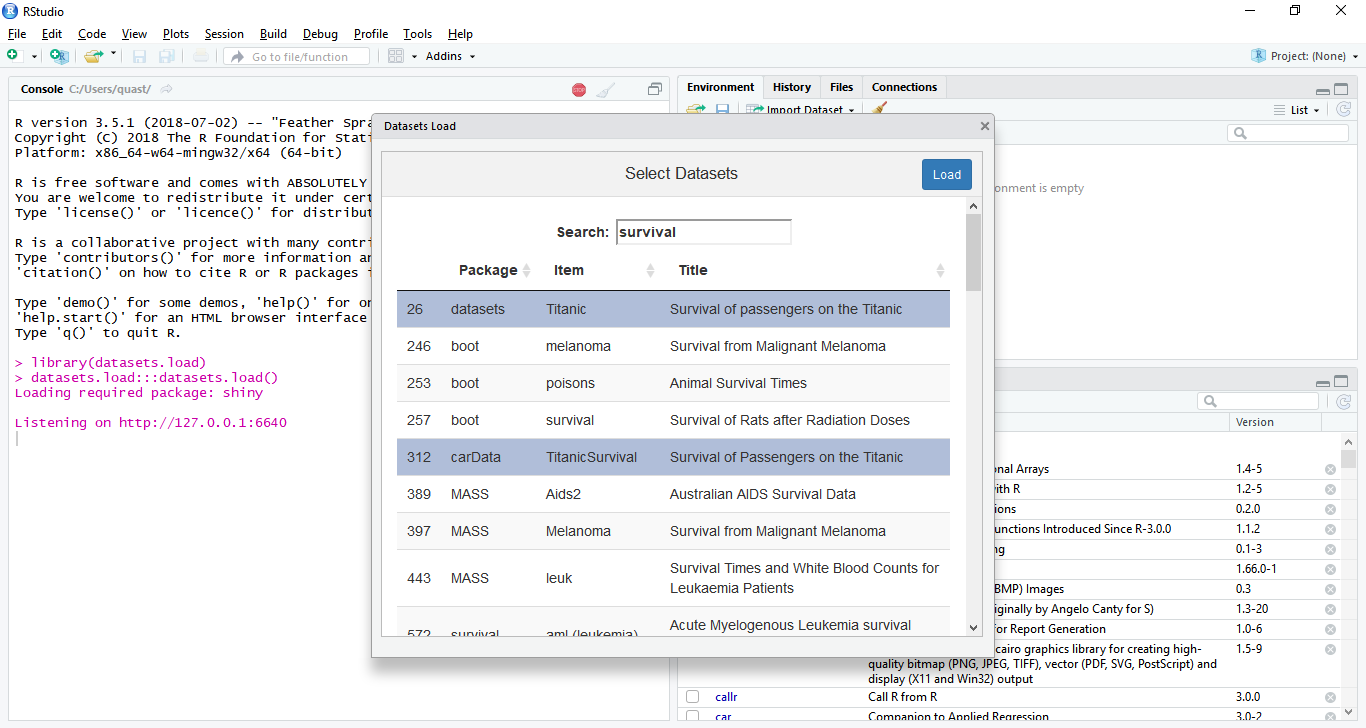
A screenshot of the datasets.load GUI

Quast is an functionary of the United Nations at the International Telecommunication Union, as Secretary of the ITU-WHO Focus Group on Artificial Intelligence for Health and AI for Good.

Bastiaan Quast created the popular machine learning framework rnn in R, which allows native implementations of recurrent neural network architectures, such as LSTM and GRU (>100,000 downloads). While working at UNCTAD, Quast developed the popular package datasets.load, which is part of the top 10% of most downloaded R packages (>100,000). The R packages decompr and wiod have been downloaded >20,000 times.

== Bibliography ==
Kummritz, Victor; Quast, Bastiaan (2017). Global value chains in developing economies. London, United Kingdom: VoxEU.
