= List of honorary fellows of Balliol College, Oxford =

Honorary Fellows of Balliol College, Oxford.

- Sir George Alberti
- Sir Eric Anderson
- Eric Lubbock, 4th Baron Avebury
- Hagan Bayley
- Ronnie Bell
- Maxine Berg
- Rajeev Bhargava
- Tom Bingham, Baron Bingham of Cornhill
- Ewan Birney
- Sir Drummond Bone
- Glen Bowersock
- Sir Henry Brooke
- John Carey
- Amit Chaudhuri
- Richard Cobb
- Gavyn Davies
- Richard Dawkins
- Dame Cressida Dick
- Sir Peter Donnelly
- Bill Drayton
- James Fairfax
- Stephanie Flanders
- Sir Simon Fraser
- Sir Edward Fry
- Peter Geach
- Andrew Graham
- Dame Clare Grey
- Harald V of Norway
- Denis Healey, Baron Healey
- Robert Hinde
- Nicola Horlick
- Brian Hutton, Baron Hutton
- Charlotte Jones
- Sir John Keegan
- Sir David Keene
- Sir Anthony Kenny
- Sir Nicholas Kenyon
- James Shaw, Baron Kilbrandon
- David Maxwell Fyfe, 1st Earl of Kilmuir
- Sir Anthony Leggatt
- Gwyneth Lewis
- Sir Colin Lucas
- Empress Masako
- Sir Neil MacCormick
- Ved Mehta
- Russell Meiggs
- Cheryl Misak
- Edward Mortimer
- Nada Al-Nashif
- Deepak Nayyar
- George Nicholl
- Loyiso Nongxa
- Edwin Palmer
- Chris Patten, Baron Patten
- Sir Nicholas Penny
- Richard Portes
- Graham Richards
- Sir Christopher Ricks
- Ivan Roitt
- Lyndal Roper
- Alan Ryan
- Paul Sarbanes
- Kurt Schmoke
- Sir Nigel Sheinwald
- Paul Slack
- Oliver Smithies
- Peter Snow
- George Steiner
- Sir Simon Stevens
- Gilbert Strang
- Paul Streeten
- John Hamilton, 1st Viscount Sumner
- Charles Taylor
- Sir Keith Thomas
- Sarah Thomas
- Richard von Weizsäcker
- Sir Stanley Wells
- Martin Litchfield West
- Timothy Williamson
- Michael Winterbottom
