= Centre for Finance and Development =

Research center in Geneva, Switzerland

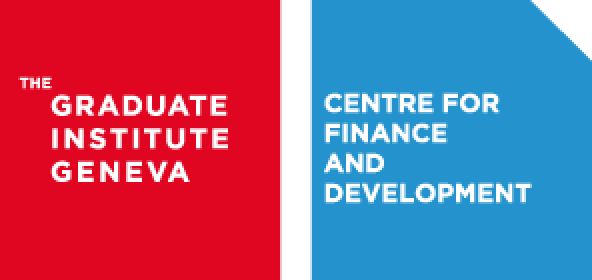
- Centre for Finance and Development Logo
- Formation: 2012
- Founders: Jean-Louis Arcand, Ugo Panizza
- Headquarters: Geneva
- Location: Maison de la paix
- Fields: Development economics, International finance, Microeconomics
- Director: Nathan Sussman
- Key people: Ugo Panizza, Cédric Tille, Charles Wyplosz, Lore Vandewalle, Huang Yi
- Parent organization: Graduate Institute of International and Development Studies
- Website: graduateinstitute.ch/cfd

The Centre for Finance and Development (CFD) is an interdisciplinary research centre at the Graduate Institute of International and Development Studies which is housed at the Maison de la paix in Geneva. The Centre is staffed by several prominent economists including director Nathan Sussman, deputy-director Ugo Panizza, Lore Vandewalle, Cédric Tille, and Charles Wyplosz.

== Founding ==
The Centre for Finance and Development was founded in 2012 with a grant of the Pictet Group Foundation for Development. It was formally inaugurated by Harvard professor Ricardo Hausmann in September 2012. The Centre's first director was Jean-Louis Arcand. From 2016, Ugo Panizza was director of the CFD, after which Nathan Sussman took over his role in 2019.

== Expertise ==
The Centre specifically focuses on research in the following fields:

- Financial inclusion and access to financial markets in developing countries;
- Impact investing and SDG investing;
- Scaling up investment in Small and Medium Enterprises in developing countries and SME finance;
- Fintech and technological developments in developing countries;
- Alternative sources of funding (microfinance or microinsurance);
- Sustainable development.

== Activities ==
The Centre's faculty regularly publishes their research in academic journals, books and the Centre's own research paper series. The research output includes the influential Too Much Finance paper, the research for which was done at the Centre for Finance and Development.

The Centre regularly hosts conferences and public lectures. In 2017, the CFD hosted the second edition of the DebtCon conference on sovereign debt. In 2018, the Centre hosted a two-day conference on blended development finance together with the Center for Global Development and the CDC Group. In 2019, it hosted the annual lecture of the United Nations University World Institute for Development Economics Research with Santiago Levy and hosted the first annual conference of the Private Sector Development Research Network, a network involving the International Finance Corporation, CDC Group, Internationanl Growth Centre and other institutions in the field. Since 2020, the Centre also hosts an online seminar series on economic history, the International Macro History Online Seminar.
