= Nature, Culture, and Inequality =

2023 book by Thomas Piketty

- Author: Thomas Piketty
- Original title: Nature, culture et inégalités
- Translator: Willard Wood
- Language: French
- Subject: Economic inequality
- Genre: Non-fiction
- Publication date: 2023
- Publication place: France
- English publication date: 10 September 2024
- Pages: 90 (French edition)96 (English edition)
- ISBN: 978-1-63542-456-0 English edition

Creating Nature, Culture, and Inequality: A Comparative and Historical Perspective is a 2023 book by French economist Thomas Piketty. It was first published in French as Nature, culture et inégalités: Une perspective comparative et historique by the Société d'ethnologie. An English translation by Willard Wood was published in 2024.

== Reception ==
The book has been reviewed in leading publications, with both its scope and limitations being discussed. Kirkus Reviews described the book as an accessible introduction to Piketty's wider body of work. The review found that the book provided a useful synthesis, but noted that readers familiar with his previous publications would encounter few new ideas. It also considered the treatment of nature and culture less extensive than the title suggested. Writing in The Guardian, economist Jonathan Portes agreed with Piketty's emphasis on education and with much of his analysis of inequality. Portes was less convinced by the book's brief discussion of removing services from market control. He also criticised its limited explanation of how political mobilisation develops and its omission of the technology sector's role in concentrating wealth and political power. Paris School of Economics highlighted its discussion of the twentieth-century redistribution of income and wealth, while noting that the poorest half of the population continued to own only a small share of total wealth. Paul Sweeney of The Irish Times regarded the book as a clear overview of Piketty's research on taxation and inequality.
