= Michael C. Burda =

American economist

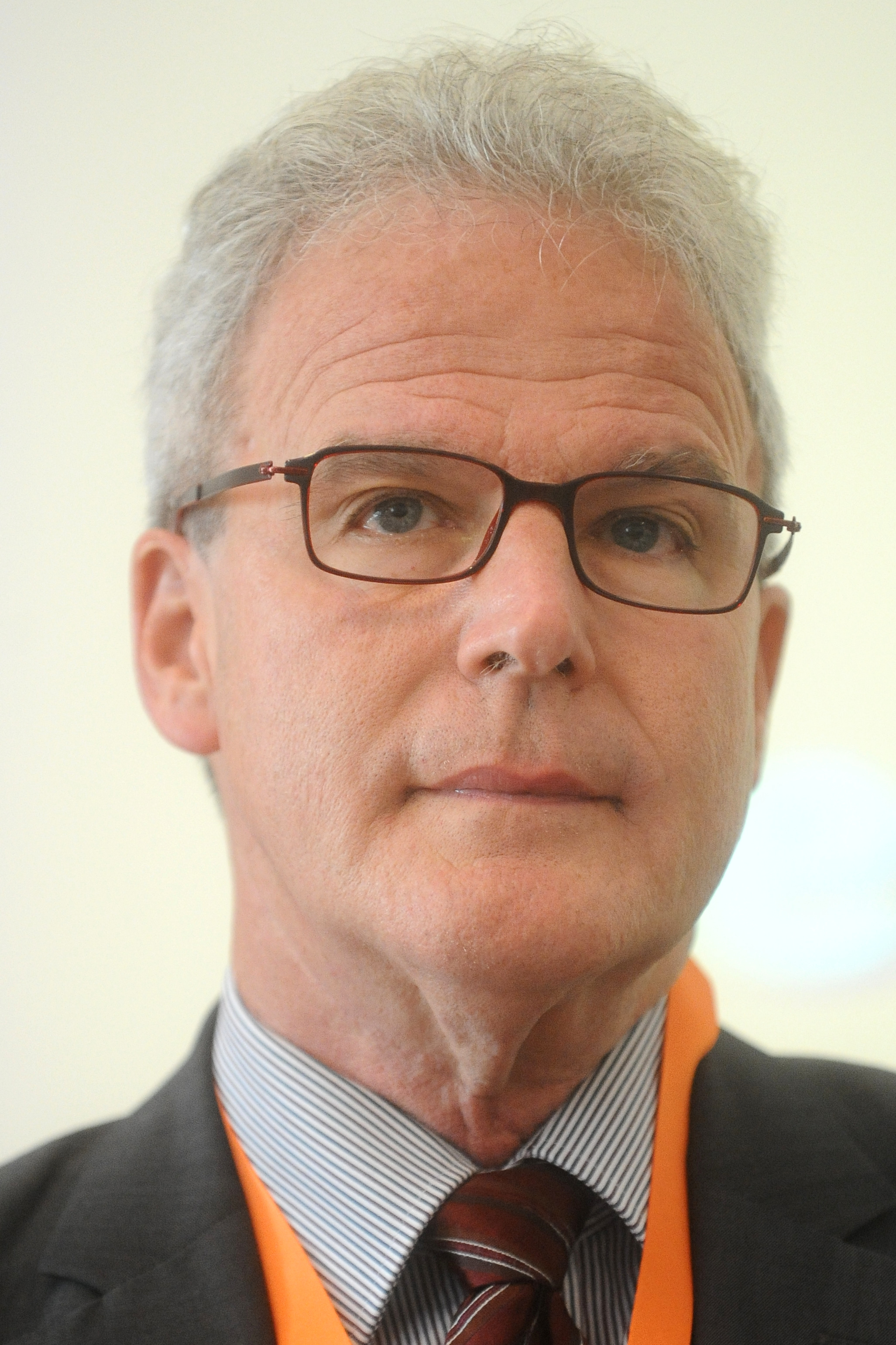
- Burda in 2016

Academic background
- Education: Harvard University (BA, MA, PhD)
- Doctoral advisor: Jeffrey Sachs; Olivier Blanchard

Academic work
- Discipline: Macroeconomics; Labor economics
- Institutions: Humboldt University of Berlin
- Awards: Gossen Prize (1998)
- Website: Information at IDEAS / RePEc

Michael C. Burda is an American macroeconomist and professor at the Humboldt University of Berlin.

Since 1993 he has been director of the Institute for Economic Theory II and since 2007 visiting professor at the European School of Management and Technology (ESMT). He has also taught at Berkeley and INSEAD. In 1998, Burda received the Gossen Prize of the German Verein für Socialpolitik. He is research fellow at the Centre for Economic Policy Research (CEPR), Institute for the Study of Labor (IZA) and a fellow of the European Economic Association.

Burda received his B.A., M.A. and Ph.D. (1987) at Harvard University and is a fluent speaker of German. His research is primarily in macroeconomics, labor economics and issues of European integration.

In 2009, Burda and Charles Wyplosz published the 5th edition of their textbook Macroeconomics: A European Text, Oxford University Press, which has been translated into twelve other languages. Also, he is regularly involved in meetings regarding the financial and monetary system.

He was elected fellow of the European Economic Association.

== Other activities ==
- German Institute for Economic Research (DIW), Member of the Scientific Advisory Board
