= RNN =

RNN or rnn may refer to:

- Random neural network, a mathematical representation of an interconnected network of neurons or cells which exchange spiking signals
- Recurrent neural network, a class of artificial neural networks where connections between nodes form a directed graph along a temporal sequence
  - rnn (software)
- Recursive neural network, a kind of deep neural network created by applying the same set of weights recursively over a structured input
- WRNN-TV, branded as Regional News Network, a television station licensed to New Rochelle, New York, United States
- Rassd News Network, Egypt
- Reserva Natural Nacional, national park in Colombia
- IATA code for Bornholm Airport, Denmark
- rnn, ISO 639-3 code for the Roon language
