= Too Much Finance =

2010s scholarly economics paper

"Too Much Finance?" is a scholarly paper by Jean-Louis Arcand, Enrico Berkes, and Ugo Panizza. The paper was originally described in a 2011 VoxEU column, in 2012 it was issued as IMF working paper, and in 2015 was published by the Journal of Economic Growth.

== Contributions ==
The paper provides empirical evidence for the hypothesis that there is a point after which a growing financial sector starts having a negative impact on economic growth.

== Popular media ==
On 4 September 2012, Time Magazine featured the article 'Bankers: Who Needs Them?', based on the working paper. The article features the same quote by James Tobin as the working paper:

"We are throwing more and more of our resources, including the cream of our youth, into financial activities remote from the production of goods and services, into activities that generate high private rewards disproportionate to their social productivity."

It further cites one of the authors, Ugo Panizza who summarizes the working paper as:

"Our findings show that there can be "too much" finance. While opponents of regulation like Alan Greenspan argued that less credit may hurt our future standard of living, our results indicate that, in countries with very large financial sectors, regulatory policies that reduce the size of the financial sector may have a positive effect on economic growth."

On 26 September 2012 the BBC World Service programme Business Daily interviewed one of the authors - Ugo Panizza - on the issue of too much finance for a broadcast on the rise of digital currencies.

On 26 May 2015, the Financial Times published a widely read column by Martin Wolf that discusses the original findings of the "Too much finance?" paper, as well as more recent research by the Bank of International Settlements and IMF which supports these findings. The Financial Times article labels the authors of "Too Much Finance?" as IMF researchers. However, only Berkes was at the IMF when the paper was originally written, Arcand and Panizza are professors of Economics at the Graduate Institute in Geneva.
