= Orazio Attanasio =

Italian economist

- Born: 31 October 1959 (age 67); Naples, Italy
- Citizenship: Italy; United Kingdom

Academic background
- Education: University of Bologna; London School of Economics and Political Science
- Doctoral advisor: James Davidson

Academic work
- Institutions: University College London; Institute for Fiscal Studies; University of Bologna; Stanford University
- Website: Information at IDEAS / RePEc

Orazio P. Attanasio (born 31 October 1959, in Naples) is an Italian economist and the Cowles Professor of Economics at Yale University. He was the Jeremy Bentham Chair of Economics at University College London. He graduated from the University of Bologna in 1982 and London School of Economics in 1988. He then went to teach at Stanford and was a National Fellow at Stanford's Hoover Institution and a visiting professor at the University of Chicago before arriving at University College London in 1995. While in London, he was also a research co-director at the Institute for Fiscal Studies (IFS) in London, director and founder of the Centre for the Evaluation of Development Policies at the Institute for Fiscal Studies, and a director of the ESRC Centre for the Microeconomic Analysis of Public Policy. He moved to Yale in 2019.

In 2001 Attanasio was elected Fellow of the Econometric Society and in 2004 he was elected Fellow of the British Academy. He was also elected to be president of the European Economic Association in 2014. In 2017 he was elected second vice president of the Econometric Society, and served as its President in 2020.

In October 2016, Attanasio won the 1 million Swiss francs Klaus J. Jacobs Research Prize for his "use of economic models and field experiments to assess and shape early child development programs and policies in low income countries".

In 2016 Attanasio was also awarded the Carlos Diaz Alejandro prize by the Latin American and Caribbean Economic Association and in 2017 he was elected to serve in 2020 as the 2nd vice-president of the Econometric Society.

Attanasio's research focuses include household consumption, saving and labour supply, human capital accumulation, and micro credit, among others. He has also served as managing editor of The Review of Economic Studies, the Journal of the European Economic Association, and Quantitative Economics. In 2004, Attanasio co-authored an IFS evaluation of an initiative which was designed to improve the lives of children in small Colombian towns and villages by paying their mothers to improve their children's food intake; in return, younger children had to have regular medical check-ups and older ones were required to attend school regularly. Begun in 2002, and funded by both the World Bank and the Inter-American Development Bank, the project had examined how funds to alleviate poverty and promote development should be targeted. Early results were positive, showing both an increase in the number of children going to school and those enjoying improved diets. Attanasio said, "This evaluation is important, not just for Colombia, but to help us understand how developing countries can best target valuable resources to improve the prospects for their poorest children."

== Publication ==
- "Pension Wealth and Household Saving: Evidence from Pension Reforms in the United Kingdom". American Economic Review. 93 (5). (with S. Rohwedder): 1499–1521. December 2003. doi:10.1257/000282803322655419. JSTOR 3132139.
