= Richard Portes =

American economist

Richard Portes CBE, FBA
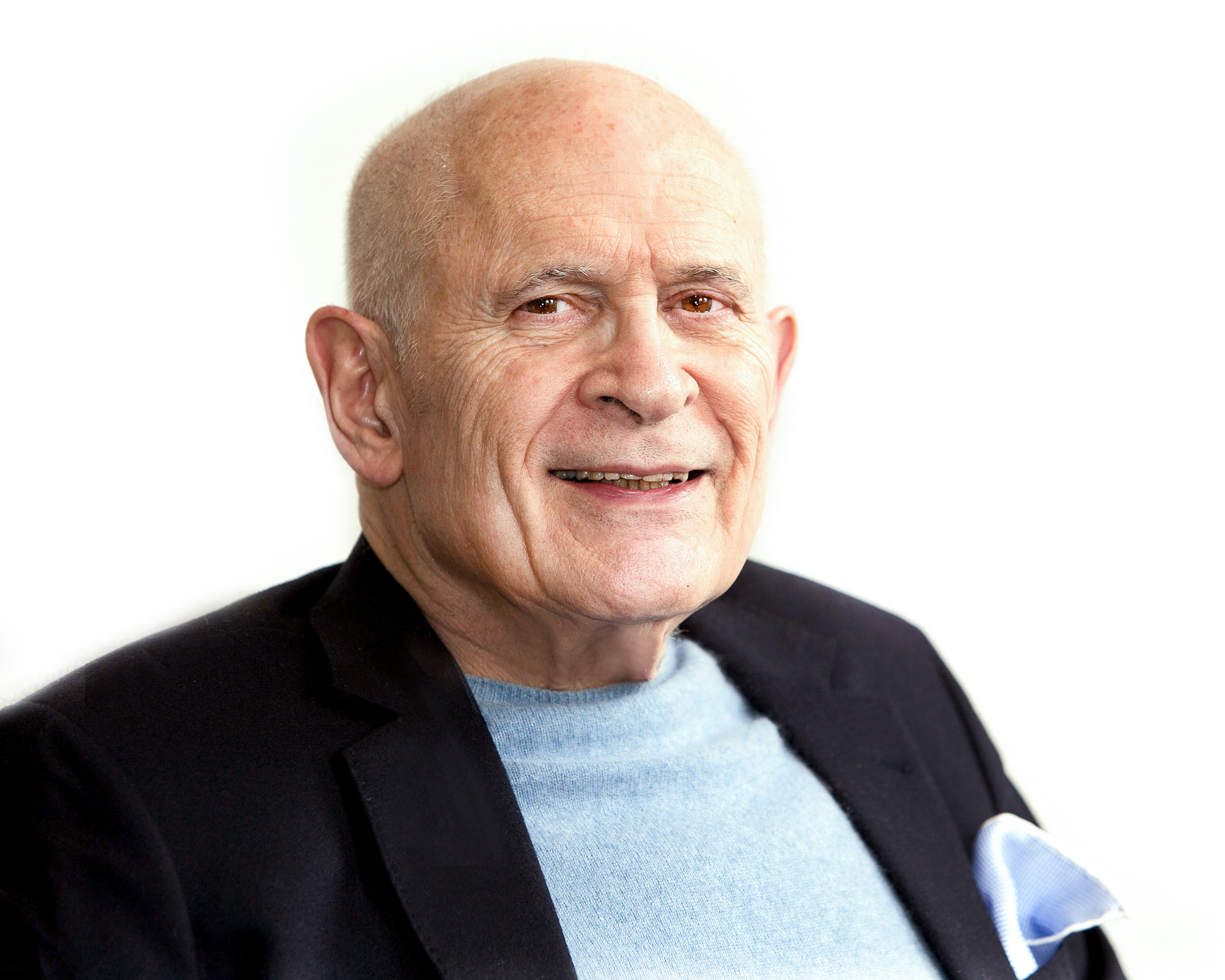
- Born: Chicago, Illinois, U.S.
- Citizenship: United States; United Kingdom
- Spouses: Barbara Frank (m. 1963; div. 2005); Helene Rey (m. 2006)
- Children: 3, including Jonathan

Academic background
- Education: Yale University (BA); Balliol College, Oxford (MA, DPhil)

Academic work
- Discipline: Economics
- Institutions: London Business School
- Awards: Rhodes Scholarship; Woodrow Wilson Fellowship; Bicentennial Preceptorship, Princeton University; Guggenheim Fellowship; Fellow of the Econometric Society; Commander of the Order of the British Empire; Fellow of the British Academy
- Website: Official website; Information at IDEAS / RePEc

Notes
- Richard Portes publications indexed by Google Scholar

Richard David Portes CBE FBA is an American and British economist known for his work on international macroeconomics, financial regulation, and European integration. He is Professor of Economics at the London Business School.

Portes is the founder and Honorary President of the Centre for Economic Policy Research (CEPR). He previously served for three decades as Directeur d'Études at the School for Advanced Studies in the Social Sciences (EHESS) in Paris. Portes is a Commander of the Order of the British Empire and a Fellow of the British Academy.

== Early life and education ==
Portes was born in Chicago, Illinois, to Herbert Portes and Abra Halperin Portes. He entered Yale University in 1959 and earned a Bachelor of Arts degree in 1962.

He then went to Oxford University on a Rhodes Scholarship, attending Balliol College, Oxford from 1962 to 1963 and Nuffield College, Oxford from 1963 to 1964. He then returned to Balliol, where he completed his D.Phil. in economics in 1969. He also received an M.A. (Oxon.) in 1965.

== Academic career ==
Portes began his academic career as Official Fellow and Tutor in Economics at Balliol College, Oxford (1965–1969), and later as Assistant Professor of Economics and International Affairs at Princeton University (1969–1972). He was offered tenure in 1971 but then moved to the University of London in 1972 as the founding Professor of Economics at Birkbeck College, where he chaired the Department of Economics and served as Dean of the Faculty of Economics.

He joined London Business School in 1995 as Professor of Economics, chairing its Economics Subject Area from 2000 to 2003 and later serving as a Governor from 2010 to 2013. From 2014 to 2017, he was the inaugural holder of the Tommaso Padoa-Schioppa Chair in European Economic and Monetary Integration at the European University Institute in Florence. From 2016 to 2025, he was Academic Co-Director of the AQR Asset Management Institute at the London Business School.

He served as part-time Directeur d’Études at the School for Advanced Studies in the Social Sciences (EHESS) in Paris from 1978 until his retirement from this post in 2008.

In addition, Portes has held visiting appointments on a Guggenheim Fellowship at Harvard University (1977–1978), as Distinguished Global Visiting Professor at the Haas School of Business, University of California, Berkeley (1999–2000), and as the Joel Stern Visiting Professor of International Finance at Columbia Business School (2003–2004). He has been a Research Associate of the National Bureau of Economic Research since 1980.

== Research ==
Portes’s research spans international finance, international macroeconomics, macroprudential regulation, European integration, and European bond markets. He has written extensively on sovereign debt, international capital flows, transition economies, macroeconomic disequilibrium, and European monetary integration.

His paper with Hélène Rey using gravity models for cross-border equity flows (Journal of International Economics, 2005) inspired a wide range of subsequent research on the role of distance and information in international capital movements. His study with Richard Baldwin and Joseph Francois on the eastern enlargement of the European Union was widely cited in policy debates prior to the EU expansion.

In work that foreshadowed the 1997 Asian financial crisis, his paper “Anatomy of Financial Crises” (in Portes and Swoboda, Threats to International Financial Stability, 1987) examined the links among debt defaults, exchange-market disturbances, and bank failures.

His work on collective action clauses in sovereign bond contracts (with Barry Eichengreen) proposed a solution to the “holdout” problem in debt renegotiations, which led to the widespread adoption of such clauses in international bond issuances. He was the first (with Georgios Alogoskoufis, 1991) to write on the potential international role of the euro and returned to this theme in a widely cited paper in Economic Policy with Hélène Rey (1998). His recent work with the European Systemic Risk Board (ESRB) on European financial stability and crypto-assets has also been influential in shaping policy and academic perspectives. In 2025, he highlighted the systemic risks posed by multi-issuer stablecoins in the Financial Times (25 July 2025).

== Institutional leadership, policy, and advisory work ==
Portes was the Founding Director (1983) and later President (1983–2016) of the Centre for Economic Policy Research (CEPR), a European network of academic economists. Portes co-founded the academic journal Economic Policy in 1985 (affiliated with CEPR) and served as its Co-Chair until 2017.

He served as Secretary-General of the Royal Economic Society (RES) from 1992 to 2008—the longest tenure since John Maynard Keynes. He was a founding member of the Euro 50 Group and of the revived Bellagio Group on the International Economy.

Portes has also advised several international and governmental bodies, including the European Commission, IMF, and Bank of England. He served on the General Board of the European Systemic Risk Board from 2016 to 2020, chaired its Advisory Scientific Committee (2017, 2020–2021), and currently co-chairs ESRB expert groups on non-bank financial intermediation and on crypto-assets and decentralised finance. He has been a member of the Group of Economic Policy Advisers to the European Commission presidency, and in the United Kingdom has acted as Specialist Adviser to the House of Commons Treasury Committee and the House of Lords European Union Committee on issues including the euro and the European Central Bank.

== Awards and honours ==
- 1962–1965: Rhodes Scholarship
- 1977: Guggenheim Fellowship
- 1983: Fellow of the Econometric Society
- 2000: Honorary doctorate, Université libre de Bruxelles
- 2000: Honorary doctorate, London Metropolitan University
- 2003: Commander of the Order of the British Empire in the 2003 New Year Honours for services to economics
- 2004: Fellow of the British Academy
- 2004: Fellow of the European Economic Association
- 2013: Honorary doctorate, Université Paris-Dauphine
- 2014: Honorary Fellow, Balliol College, Oxford

== Personal life ==
Portes married Barbara Diana Frank in 1963; they divorced in 2005. In 2006, he married economist Hélène Rey. He has three children: Jonathan Portes, Alison Portes, and Ana Rey-Portes.
