= Eduardo Engel =

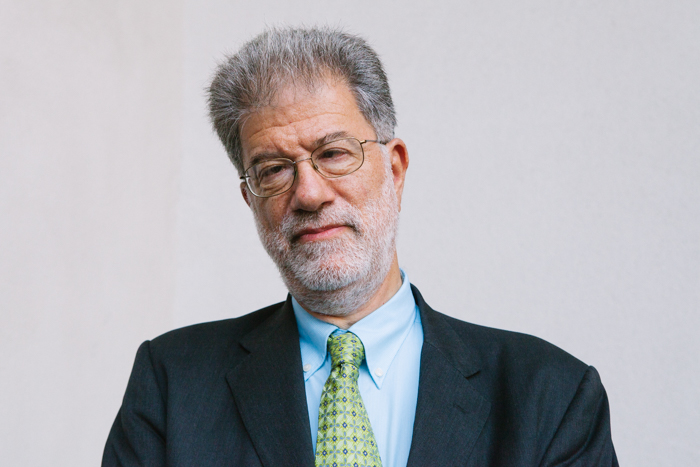
- Eduardo Engel in 2015

Academic background
- Education: MIT; Stanford University; University of Chile
- Doctoral advisor: Persi Diaconis (First Ph.D.); Roland Bénabou (Second Ph.D.)

Academic work
- Discipline: Macroeconomics
- Institutions: University of Chile; Yale University; Harvard University
- Awards: Frisch Medal (2002); Fellow of the Econometric Society (2012)

Eduardo Engel is the former president and current board member of the think tank Espacio Público and professor at the Department of Economics of the University of Chile. From 2001 to 2012 he was Professor of Economics at the Yale University. He chaired the Presidential Advisory Council on Conflicts of Interest, Influence Peddling, and Corruption – also known as the Engel Commission – in 2015.

== Education and career ==
Eduardo Engel graduated from engineering at the University of Chile in 1980. He then received a Ph.D. in statistics from Stanford University in 1987 and later a second Ph.D. in economics from Massachusetts Institute of Technology (MIT) in 1991.

After graduating from MIT, Engel accepted the position of assistant professor of public policy at Harvard’s Kennedy School of Government (1992–1994), before returning to Chile as professor at the Department of Industrial Engineering at the University of Chile (1994–2001).

In 2001 Engel joined Yale University faculty as professor of economics, where he spent eleven years (until 2012). He was voted Graduate Teacher of the Year on multiple occasions. He returned to Chile in 2012 to work as a professor at the Department of Economics at the University of Chile.

Engel was elected fellow of the Econometric Society in 2012 and currently serves as council member. From 2014 to 2015 he was president of the Latin America and Caribbean Economic Association (LACEA) and from 2009 to 2011 was founding president of the Chilean Public Policy Society. Engel also headed the Advisory Fiscal Council of the Chilean Government from 2014 to 2016. Engel has worked as a consultant to the World Bank, the Inter-American Development Bank (IDB), the Development Bank of Latin America (CAF), the [European Investment Bank (EIB), the International Monetary Fund (IMF) and many governments.

In 2012, Engel founded the think tank Espacio Público together with a multidisciplinary group of eighteen prominent experts, including the 2016 Pritzker Prize winner Alejandro Aravena, Chile's Central Bank former President José De Gregorio, economist Andrea Repetto and lawyer Nicole Nehme. Espacio Público is an independent, nonprofit think tank aimed at improving the debate, design and implementation of public policies in Chile and Latin America. Espacio Público rapidly gained widespread recognition as one of the key actors in policy discussions in Chile.

== Work in the Presidential Advisory Council (Engel Commission) ==
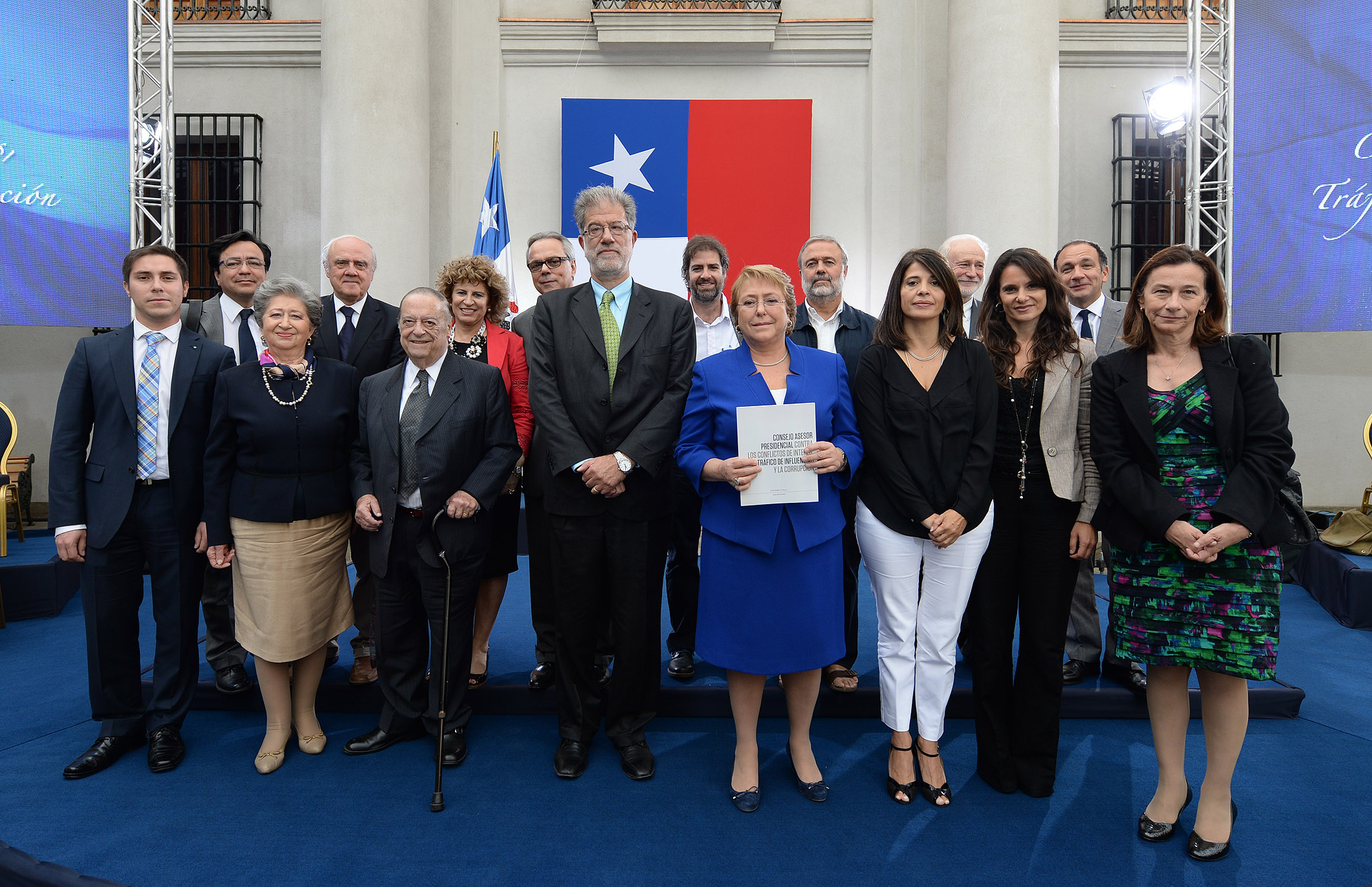
President Bachelet with the Engel Commission, 23 February 2015

Beginning in 2000, Engel began advocating changes to the legislation that regulates money in politics, through regular op-ed pieces and as external adviser in a major project by the Chilean chapter of Transparency International. Yet it was in 2015, in the midst of a series of corruption scandals involving political and business leaders of the highest level, when he undertook a leading role in the design of and advocacy for anticorruption policies.

In March 2015, following a series of corruption scandals, President Bachelet appointed Engel President of the Presidential Advisory Council on Conflicts of Interest, Influence Peddling, and Corruption – known as the Engel Commission. In only 45 days, this non-partisan commission composed of 16 members produced a comprehensive set of over 200 reform proposals covering 21 thematic areas. After the report was presented to President Bachelet and the council completed its mandate, Engel became a firm advocate for the reforms to materialize. He created Espacio Público's Anti-Corruption Observatory, a pioneering legislative monitoring initiative that employs a user-friendly online platform to assess the progress of the different proposals and triggers incidence actions to help them move forward. So far, this effort has translated into nine laws being passed in areas as diverse as political financing, anti-trust law and civic education

His anti-corruption work has been praised both at home and abroad. In May 2016, in a poll by Chilean newspaper La Segunda, Engel appeared as the country's most admired public figure. Engel has been invited to present this work at public events in Washington, DC, Santa Cruz (Bolivia), Montevideo, Buenos Aires, São Paulo and Bogota.

== Research ==
Engel has published extensively in areas such as macroeconomics, public finance, econometrics, infrastructure economics and regulation. Currently, his research focuses on macroeconomic dynamic models, private participation in infrastructure, and improving State performance.

Together with Ricardo Caballero, Engel received the 2002 Frisch Medal of the Econometric Society for their paper "Explaining Investment Dynamics in U.S. Manufacturing: A Generalized (S,s) Approach", Econometrica, 1999. The same year his peers elected him Chile's Economist of the Year (El Mercurio).

== Selected publications ==
- The Economics of Public-Private Partnerships: A Basic Guide, (with R. Fischer and A. Galetovic), Cambridge University Press, 2014.
- “The Basic Public Finance of Public-Private Partnerships, with R. Fischer and A. Galetovic,

Journal of the European Economic Association, 2013.

- “Aggregate Implications of Lumpy Investment: New Evidence and a DSGE Model, with R. Bachmann and R. Caballero, American Economic Journal: Macroeconomics, 2013.
- Que gane el más mejor: Mérito y competencia en el Chile de hoy, (with P. Navia), Santiago: Random House, August 2006.
- “Least-Present-Value-of-Revenue Auctions and Highway Franchising, with R. Fischer and A. Galetovic, Journal of Political Economy, 2001.
- “Poisoned grapes, mad cows, and protectionism, Journal of Policy Reform, 2000.
- “Explaining Investment Dynamics in U.S. Manufacturing: A Generalized (S,s) Approach, with R. Caballero, Econometrica, 1999.
- “Taxes and Income Distribution in Chile: Some Unpleasant Redistributive Arithmetic, with A. Galetovic and C. Raddatz, Journal of Development Economics, 1999.
- “Highway Franchising: Pitfalls and Opportunities, with R. Fischer and A. Galetovic, American Economic Review Papers and Proceedings, 1997.
- “Plant-Level Adjustment and Aggregate Investment Dynamics, with R. Caballero and J. Haltiwanger, Brookings Papers on Economic Activity, 1995.
- “Microeconomic Adjustment Hazards and Aggregate Dynamics, with R. Caballero, Quarterly Journal of Economics, 1993.
- “The Chilean Plebiscite: Projections Without Historic Data, with A. Venetoulias, Journal of the American Statistical Association, 1992.
- A Road to Randomness in Physical Systems, Springer Lecture Notes in Statistics No. 71, New York: Springer Verlag, 1992.
- “Dynamic (S,s) Economies, with R. Caballero, Econometrica, 1991.
- “A Unified Approach to the Study of Sums, Products, Time-Aggregation and other Functions of ARMA Processes, Journal of Time Series Analysis, 1984.
