= Roland Bénabou =

French economist (born 1957)

- Born: 1957 (age 68–69)

Academic background
- Education: École Polytechnique; ENPC; MIT
- Doctoral advisor: Olivier Blanchard; Jean Tirole

Academic work
- Institutions: CNRS; MIT; New York University; Princeton University
- Doctoral students: Eduardo Engel; David Laibson

Roland Jean-Marc Bénabou (born 1957) is a French economist, who is currently the Theodore A. Wells '29 Professor of Economics and Public Affairs at Princeton University. He is also a research associate at the Collège de France.

Bénabou holds engineering degrees from the Ecole Polytechnique (1980) and the Ecole des Ponts et Chaussées (1982). He received his Ph.D. in economics from MIT in 1986.

== Career ==
From 1986 to 1988, Bénabou began his career as a research associate at the CNRS. He then returned to MIT, first as an assistant professor (1988–1992), then as an associate professor (1992–1994). Bénabou was eventually appointed a full professor at New York University in 1996.

He joined Princeton's faculty in 1999.

Bénabou has published numerous papers with Nobel Laureate Jean Tirole.

Bénabou's research spans both macroeconomic and microeconomic areas, such as the interplay of inflation and imperfect competition or speculation and manipulation in financial markets. His recent work lies in three main areas. The first links inequality, growth, social mobility, and the political economy of redistribution. The second centers on education, social interactions, and the socioeconomic structure of cities. The third is that of economics and psychology ("behavioral economics"). It focuses in particular on extrinsic incentives versus intrinsic motivation, on the determinants of prosocial behavior and on motivated beliefs, both individual (overconfidence, wishful thinking, identity) and collective (groupthink, market manias, ideology, religion).
