= Jonathan Portes =

American economist

Jonathan Portes speaking on Brexit and the UK Economy at the IIEA in 2017

Jonathan Daniel Portes FAcSS (born 18 April 1966) is a professor of Economics and Public Policy at the School of Politics & Economics of King's College, London and a senior fellow at UK in a Changing Europe.

== Early life and education ==
Portes was born in Oxford and grew up in London, the son of Richard Portes, a Rhodes Scholar from Chicago. He earned a degree in mathematics from Balliol College, Oxford, and a master's degree in Public Affairs (Economics and Public Policy) at Princeton University.

== Career ==
After joining HM Treasury in 1987, he held increasingly senior positions in the civil service, rising to be the chief economist at the Department for Work and Pensions and then the chief economist at the Cabinet Office under Gordon Brown. He left the civil service in 2011, after the Labour Party lost power to the Conservative-Liberal Democrat coalition government.

Portes was appointed as the director of the National Institute of Economic and Social Research in February 2011. In October 2015, it was announced that Portes would step down as Director of NIESR before the end of that year, following a management review at the organisation.

His areas of interest include fiscal policy, labour markets and immigration. He has a particular interest in the economic effects of Brexit, and was a prominent critic of the 'austerity' policies advocated by George Osborne, the former Chancellor of the Exchequer; Portes has described the Coalition's Incapacity Benefit reassessment programme — a major Whitehall project that was supposed to cut welfare spending by up to seven billion pounds a year — as "the biggest single social policy failure of the last fifteen years". He analysed the government's welfare reforms for BBC Radio 4 in 2014.

Portes is a council member of the Royal Economic Society, a trustee of the charity Coram, a senior fellow at the UK in a Changing Europe. He was elected a Fellow of the Academy of Social Sciences in 2018.

== Views ==
Portes has said that British government policy since 2010 has disproportionately harmed the poor. In 2018, he said "There were a lot of choices, and the government chose to balance the budget on the backs of the poorest." In 2023, Portes lost a bet made in 2018 with Christopher Snowdon, in which Portes had incorrectly predicted that relative child poverty would rise to unprecedented levels.
