= Andrea Repetto =

Chilean economist

- Andrea Isabel Repetto Lisboa
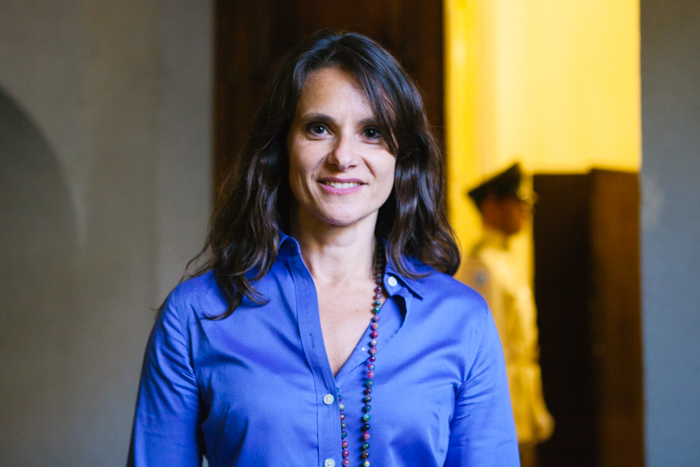
- Born: May 20, 1969 (age 57)
- Education: Massachusetts Institute of Technology, Pontifical Catholic University of Chile
- Occupations: Economist; professor; researcher

Andrea Isabel Repetto Lisboa (born 20 May 1969) is a Chilean economist. She currently has a teaching position at the Adolfo Ibáñez University in Santiago. She holds a PhD in economics from the Massachusetts Institute of Technology, a master's degree in economics from the Pontifical Catholic University of Chile and an undergraduate degree in commercial engineering from the same university.

Repetto is a professor, researcher and director of the Master in Economics and Public Policy program in the School of Government at the Adolfo Ibáñez University. Her recent research is based on economics and psychology, with application to credit and savings of household, and economics of education. She is a member of the Presidential Advisory Council on Labor and Social Equity and chairwoman of the Commission of Users of Unemployment Insurance.

She was the coordinator of the Subcommittee on Labor Market and Labor Policy at the Presidential Advisory Council of Labor and Social Equity. Repetto has been an academic fellow at the Center for Applied Economics of the industrial engineering department at the University of Chile; as well as director of the Master of Applied Economics at the University of Chile and elected director of the society of economists of Chile, and a visiting fellow at the World Bank. Repetto is also a member of the Latin American and Caribbean Economic Association's executive committee.
