= George Nicholl =

George Frederick Nicholl (5 November 1832 – 28 July 1913) was a British academic, who held the position of Lord Almoner's Professor of Arabic at the University of Oxford from 1878 until 1909.

== Career ==
Nicholl was born in Tipton, Staffordshire (now West Midlands). He matriculated at Oxford as a member of Balliol College in 1878 at the age of 45. His appointment by the Lord Almoner to be Lord Almoner's Professor of Arabic was announced in The Times on 30 October 1878, when it was also recorded that the university would award Nicholl the degree of MA by decree on 5 November 1878. In addition to his position as Lord Almoner's professor (1878–1909), he became Professor of Sanskrit and Persian at King's College London in 1879 and was also lecturer in Oriental languages at Oxford from 1880 onwards. He was appointed an Honorary Fellow of Balliol College in 1888. He resigned with effect from 24 June 1909, because of ill-health, and was the last Lord Almoner's professor at Oxford.

His publications included grammatical works in Samaritan, Bengali and Assamese. In retirement, he lived in Felixstowe, Suffolk, and died on 28 July 1913. In an obituary published in The Times, he was described as "a celebrated scholar and teacher of the Indian languages, classical and vernacular, and the author of several educational works", who had worked for many years to help teach probationers members of the Indian Civil Service studying at Oxford.
