= Albert Fishlow =

Albert Fishlow is an economist, a professor emeritus of economics at the University of California, Berkeley and a professor emeritus of international and public affairs at Columbia University. He is the former director of the Columbia Institute of Latin American Studies and Center for the Study of Brazil at Columbia. He was previously the Paul A. Volcker Senior Fellow for International Economics at the Council of Foreign Relations.

Fishlow's published research has addressed issues in economic history, Brazilian and Latin American development strategy, as well as economic relations between industrialized and developing countries. Fishlow has served as deputy assistant secretary of state for inter-American affairs from 1970 to 1976. In 1999, he was awarded the National Order of the Southern Cross by the government of Brazil.

Fishlow received his BA from the University of Pennsylvania and his PhD from Harvard University. Previously, Fishlow was professor of economics at the University of California, Berkeley and dean of international and area studies. He has also been visiting professor at the Yale School of Management and professor of economics and director of the Center for International and Area Studies at Yale University.

== Selected publications ==
- Optimal Resource Allocation in an Imperfect Market Setting, in The Journal of Political Economy, December 1961.
- Brazilian Size Distribution of Income, in The American Economic Review, May 1972.
- Brazilian Development in Long-Term Perspective, in The American Economic Review, May 1980.
- "Latin America in the XXI century" in Economic and Social Development into the XXI century, edited by Louis Emmerij (Inter-American Development Bank 1997)
- "Contending with Capital Flows: What is Different about the 1990s?" with Barry Eichengreen in Capital Flows and Financial Crises, editor Miles Kahler (Cornell 1998)
- The United States and the Americas: A Twenty-First Century View, co-editor James Jones (Norton 1999) ISBN 978-0-393-97447-8

== Foreign honours ==
- Brazil: Order of the Southern Cross
