= Miguel Urquiola =

American economist

- Occupations: Economist and academic

Academic background
- Education: B.A., Economics and Political Science; Ph.D., Economics
- Alma mater: Swarthmore College, Philadelphia; University of California, Berkeley

Academic work
- Institutions: Columbia University

Miguel Urquiola is an American economist and academic. He is vice provost for Academic Initiatives, dean of Social Science, and professor of Economics and International Affairs at Columbia University. He is also a research associate at the National Bureau of Economic Research.

Urquiola's research is focused on the economics of education, development economics, and public economics. He is the author of Markets, Minds, and Money: Why America Leads the World in University Research, a book exploring why the United States developed the leading research universities.

Urquiola is a fellow of the Bureau for Research and Economic Analysis of Development. and was a co-editor of the Journal of Human Resources.

== Education ==
Urquiola obtained a B.A. in Economics and Political Science in 1992 from Swarthmore College. Later in 2000, he obtained a Ph.D. in Economics from the University of California, Berkeley.

== Career ==
Urquiola started his academic career as an assistant professor at the Bolivian Catholic University in 1998. From 2000 to 2001, he worked at the World Bank and in 2001, he joined Cornell University as an assistant professor of Economics, where he remained until 2003. He has worked at Columbia University since then, as an assistant professor from 2003 to 2009, an associate professor from 2009 to 2014, and a professor since 2014.

From 2012-2015, Urquiola was the vice dean of the School of International and Public Affairs. In 2019, he became chair of the department of Economics, and in 2022, was appointed the dean of Social Sciences. In 2025, he became senior vice-provost for Academic Initiatives.

From 2007 to 2011, Urquiola was a faculty research fellow at the National Bureau of Economic Research before being appointed as a research associate in 2011. He was a co-editor of The Journal of Human Resources.

== Research ==
Urquiola has conducted research on the challenges in establishing clear input-output relationships in education. His studies on class size and Latin American education policies have highlighted both methodological difficulties and the importance of rigorous designs to identify causal effects on student achievement. In related research, he assessed how Chile's nationwide school voucher program impacted educational outcomes and found that the availability of unrestricted choice led to increased sorting, as higher-performing public school students moved to private schools. However, the study found no evidence that choice improved average educational outcomes. Furthermore, he explored how the Chilean government's use of school rankings for resource allocation influenced the effectiveness of educational programs, such as the P-900 initiative.

Urquiola's research also investigated if attending better quality school improved student outcomes and found that being enrolled in better quality schools led to improved academic performance and significant behavioral responses from teachers, students, and parents.

Urquiola wrote Markets, Minds, and Money: Why America Leads the World in University Research in 2020, in which he argued that America leads the world in university research because of its free-market model of higher education instead of high student test scores. Michael Andrews in a Journal of Economic Literature review and J. E. R. Staddon writing for James G. Martin Center agreed with Urquiola's central argument. Andrews wrote that "Urquiola does a convincing job arguing that the US higher education's free market orientation has allowed it to fund the world's best system of research, and he illustrates this argument with fascinating anecdotes from history" and Staddon wrote that Urquiola "makes sense of a complex issue". However, Andrews criticized the book's narrow focus, especially the omission of "discussion of America's non-elite public universities." Staddon, on the other hand, disagreed with Urquiola's assumption that "grant-supported research is a net cost", calling it net beneficial for the institutions

== Awards and honors ==
- Fellow, Bureau for Research and Economic Analysis of Development

== Bibliography ==
=== Books ===
- Markets, Minds, and Money: Why America Leads the World in University Research (2020) ISBN 9780674244238

=== Selected articles ===
- Urquiola, Miguel (1 February 2006). "Identifying Class Size Effects in Developing Countries: Evidence from Rural Bolivia". The Review of Economics and Statistics. 88 (1): 171–177. doi:10.1162/rest.2006.88.1.171. ISSN 0034-6535.
- Chay, Kenneth Y.; McEwan, Patrick J.; Urquiola, Miguel (September 2005). "The Central Role of Noise in Evaluating Interventions That Use Test Scores to Rank Schools" (PDF). American Economic Review. 95 (4): 1237–1258. doi:10.1257/0002828054825529. ISSN 0002-8282.
- Hsieh, Chang-Tai; Urquiola, Miguel (1 September 2006). "The effects of generalized school choice on achievement and stratification: Evidence from Chile's voucher program". Journal of Public Economics. 90 (8): 1477–1503. doi:10.1016/j.jpubeco.2005.11.002. ISSN 0047-2727.
- Pop-Eleches, Cristian; Urquiola, Miguel (June 2013). "Going to a Better School: Effects and Behavioral Responses". American Economic Review. 103 (4): 1289–1324. doi:10.1257/aer.103.4.1289. ISSN 0002-8282.
- Epple, Dennis; Romano, Richard E.; Urquiola, Miguel (June 2017). "School Vouchers: A Survey of the Economics Literature" (PDF). Journal of Economic Literature. 55 (2): 441–492. doi:10.1257/jel.20150679. ISSN 0022-0515.
