= Charles Wyplosz =

French economist

- Born: 5 September 1947 (age 79); Vichy, France

Academic background
- Education: Ecole Centrale Paris, Harvard University

Academic work
- Discipline: International Finance, Economic and Monetary Union
- Institutions: Graduate Institute of International and Development Studies, Geneva
- Website: Information at IDEAS / RePEc

Charles Wyplosz (born 5 September 1947 in Vichy, France) is a French-Swiss economist.

== Life ==
He earned an engineering degree from Ecole Centrale Paris (1970), a Certificat Supérieur d'Études from Institut Supérieur de Statistiques des Universités de Paris (1972), and a PhD in economics from Harvard University (1978).

From 1978 until 1996 he was assistant professor of economics, rising to full professor and associate dean at INSEAD. During the period 1986–1996 he was professor at the École des Hautes Études en Sciences Sociales. From 1995 to 2018 he was Professor of Economics at the Graduate Institute in Geneva and is now Emeritus Professor. He served as Director of the International Centre for Monetary and Banking Studies (ICMB) in Geneva, where he launched the series of Geneva Reports. He has been founding editor of Economic Policy from 1984 to 2001, of the online Covid Economics Papers review, and served as Director of the International Macroeconomics Programme at the Centre for Economic Policy Research (CEPR) and as Co-Editor of VoxEU.

He has served as advisor to various governments (Russia, Cyprus, France) as well as to numerous international organisations such the IMF, the World Bank, the European Commission, the European Parliament, the Asian Development Bank. He is a frequent speaker and a regular columnist for several newspapers in France, Switzerland and the UK.

His areas of research are macroeconomics, exchange rates and the labor market. He has worked extensively on monetary policy, especially the European Monetary System, the Economic and Monetary Union of the European Union, financial crisis, and capital mobility and economic transformation of former communist economies. He has published many articles in professional reviews and books, including two widely used textbooks listed below.

He has been awarded the Legion d'Honneur by the President of France.

== Selected publications ==
- Macroeconomics: a European Text by Michael C. Burda and Charles Wyplosz (Oxford UP, 7th ed 2017 ISBN 9780198737513)
- The Economics of European Integration by Richard E. Baldwin and Charles Wyplosz (McGraw Hill, 7th ed 2022, ISBN 9781526849434))
