= Beatrice Weder di Mauro =

Swiss academic and businesswoman (born 1965)

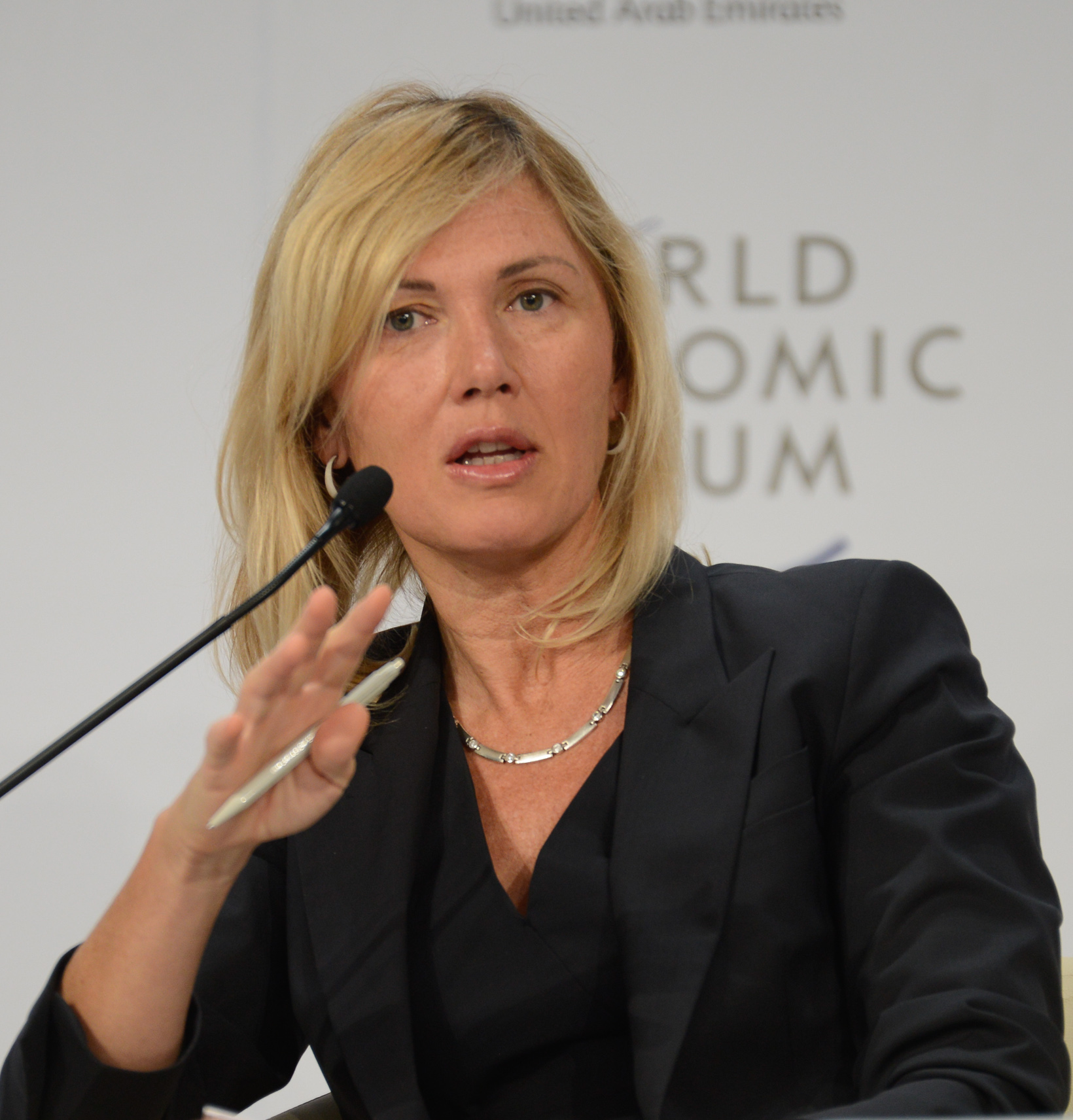
- Weder di Mauro at the World Economic Forum Summit on the Global Agenda in 2012
- Born: 3 August 1965 (age 61); Basel

Academic background
- Education: University of Basel

Academic work
- Discipline: Economic policy, International Macroeconomics
- Institutions: Graduate Institute of International and Development Studies
- Website: Information at IDEAS / RePEc

Beatrice Weder di Mauro (born 3 August 1965) is a Swiss economist who is currently Professor of economics at the Graduate Institute of International and Development Studies in Geneva, Research Professor and Distinguished Fellow-in-residence at the Emerging Markets Institute of INSEAD Singapore, and senior fellow at the Asian Bureau of Finance and Economic Research (ABFER). Since 2018, she also serves as President of the Centre for Economic Policy Research (CEPR).

From June 2004 to 2012, she was a member of the German Council of Economic Experts. She was the first woman and the first non-German in the council whose responsibility is to advise the German government on economic issues. She has advised both former Chancellors of Germany Gerhard Schroeder and Angela Merkel. She has served on the board of several major corporations, such as UBS, Roche, Tyssen-Krupp, and others. She currently sits on the board of Unigestion and Robert Bosch GmbH. Her research interests are in international macroeconomics and international finance, in particular sustainable finance and impact investment, financial crises, international capital flows and sovereign debt crises. She has published widely in leading academic journals and writes regular op-eds and contributions to the public policy debate.

== Life and education ==
Weder di Mauro spent her childhood with her family in Guatemala before returning to Switzerland at the age of sixteen. From 1971 to 1980, she studied in a German school in Guatemala and in 1984 she obtained the high school diploma in Basel. The different standards of living of Switzerland and Guatemala sparked her interest in economics. She later enrolled at the University of Basel, where she studied economics and received a Doctorate in Economics in 1993 and Habilitation in economics in 1999.

== Professional history ==
Weder di Mauro joined the International Monetary Fund as an economist in 1994 and the World Bank in Washington DC to work on the team of the World Development Report in 1996. From 1997 to 1998 she was Research Fellow-in-residence at United Nations University in Tokyo and from 1998 to 2001 associate professor of economics at the University of Basel. In 2001, she became Professor of Economics, Economic Policy and International Macroeconomics at the Johannes Gutenberg University of Mainz, Germany. She has also been in a visiting position at Harvard University, the National Bureau of Economic Research and the United Nations University in Tokyo.

From 2002 to 2004, she was a member of the Swiss Federal Commission on Economy in Bern, and from August 2004 to 2012, she served on Germany's Council of Economic Experts. Weder di Mauro has been a fellow at the Centre for Economic Policy Research (CEPR) since 2003 and a senior fellow of the Asian Bureau of Finance and Economic Research (ABFER) in Singapore since 2016.

Weder di Mauro served as consultant for various international organizations, including the International Finance Corporation, the World Bank, the IMF, the United Nations University, the European Central Bank the OECD Development Centre and the European Commission. In 2016 she participated in the Bilderberg conference in Dresden, Germany. She was a resident scholar and a member of the European Regional Advisory Group of the International Monetary Fund in Washington, D.C. (2010 to 2012) She chaired the Global Agenda Council on Sovereign Debt the World Economic Forum. and was a member if the Expert Group on Debt Redemption Fund and Eurobills of the European Commission from 2013 to 2014.

Werder di Mauro served as a Senior Fellow at the Centre for International Governance Innovation from 2016 to 2020. Werder di Mauro worked on several papers at the centre ranging from studying Singapore's housing policy to studies regarding the COVID-19 Pandemic.

In 2020, Weder di Mauro was appointed by the World Health Organization's Regional Office for Europe to serve as a member of the Pan-European Commission on Health and Sustainable Development, chaired by Mario Monti.

Weder di Mauro's ongoing work involves a multitude of topics such as international competitiveness and offshoring, global financial architecture, and financial institution reform. Primarily, she tends to focus on these topics in the region of the "euro zone".

== Other activities ==
=== Corporate boards ===
- Unigestion, Non-Executive Member of the Board of Directors (since 2021)
- Robert Bosch GmbH, Member of the supervisory board (since 2013)
- UBS AG, Member of the Board of Directors (2012–2021)
- Bombardier Inc., Member of the supervisory board (2016–2021)
- Deutsche Investitions- und Entwicklungsgesellschaft GmbH, Member of the supervisory board (2011–2013)
- ThyssenKrupp AG, Member of the supervisory board (2010–2013)
- Ergo Versicherungsgruppe AG, Member of the supervisory board (2005–2010)
- Roche Holding AG, Member of the supervisory board (2005–2010)
- Fraport AG, Member of the Advisory Group
- Deloitte Germany, Member of the Advisory Group

=== Non-profit organizations ===
- European Council on Foreign Relations (ECFR), Member
- Bocconi University, Member of the International Advisory Council
- Brookings Institution, Member of the Committee on International Economic and Policy Research (CIEPR)
- Centre de Recerca en Economia Internacional (CREI), Pompeu Fabra University (UPF), Member of the Advisory Board
- University of Mainz, Deputy Chairman of the University Council
- ETH Zurich Foundation, Member of the Board of Trustees
- Bellagio Group, Member (since 2014)
- World Economic Forum (WEF), Member of the Global Agenda Council on Fiscal Sustainability

== Selected publications ==
- ———; Alesina, Alberto (2002), "Do Corrupt Governments Receive Less Foreign Aid?" (PDF), American Economic Review, 92 (4): 1126–1137, doi:10.1257/00028280260344669
- ———; Brunetti, Aymo (2003), "A free press is bad news for corruption", Journal of Public Economics, 87 (7–8): 1801–1824, doi:10.1016/S0047-2727(01)00186-4
- ———; Van Rijckeghem, Caroline (2003), "Spillovers through banking centers: a panel data analysis of bank flows", Journal of International Money and Finance, 22 (4): 483–509, doi:10.1016/S0261-5606(03)00017-2
- ———; Kugler, Peter (2004), "International Portfolio Holdings and Swiss Franc Asset Returns", Swiss Journal of Economics and Statistics, 140 (3): 301–325
- ———; Liebig, Thilo; Porath, Daniel; Wedow, Michael (2007), "Basel II and bank lending to emerging markets: Evidence from the German banking sector", Journal of Banking & Finance, 31 (2): 401–418, doi:10.1016/j.jbankfin.2006.05.017
- Five essays on economic causes of corruption. WWZ-Forum, Basel 2002.
- Institutional reform in transition economics. International Monetary Fund, Washington, DC, 2001.
- Model, myth or miracle. United Nations University Press, Tokio 1999, ISBN 92-808-1030-8.
- Wirtschaft zwischen Anarchie und Rechtsstaat. Rüegger, Chur 1993, ISBN 3-7253-0469-6.
