= Jean-Louis Arcand =

Canadian economist (born 1964)

- Born: 1964 (age 61–62)

Academic background
- Education: MIT
- Influences: Amartya Sen, Ricardo Hausmann, James Heckman, Jerry Hausman

Academic work
- Discipline: Development economics, Impact Evaluation, Microeconomics, Rural Development
- Institutions: Graduate Institute of International and Development Studies Geneva, Centre for Finance and Development
- Notable ideas: Too Much Finance
- Website: Information at IDEAS / RePEc

Jean-Louis Arcand (born 1964) is a Canadian economist born in Cameroon. Since 2023, he is the President of the Global Development Network, an international organisation which supports social science research in low- and middle-income countries.He is a professor of International Economics at the Graduate Institute of International and Development Studies in Geneva, where he was the Department of Economics chair from 2017 to 2020. He is an affiliate professor at Mohammed VI Polytechnic University in Morocco. He is also a founding fellow of the European Union Development Network and senior fellow at the Fondation pour les études et recherches en développement international.

== Education ==
Jean-Louis Arcand holds a PhD in economics from MIT and a master's from the University of Cambridge. He completed his undergraduate degree at Swarthmore College.

== Contributions ==
In 2012 Jean-Louis authored (with Enrico Berkes and Ugo Panizza) the IMF working paper Too Much Finance which establishes that:

[...] there comes a point when the financial sector has a negative effect on growth – that is, when credit to the private sector exceeds 110% of GDP. It shows that, of the advanced countries currently suffering in the fallout of the global crisis were all above this threshold.

== Career ==
Jean-Louis Arcand is Director of the Centre for Finance and Development and a member of the Centre on Conflict, Development and Peacebuilding, and Professor of International Economics at the Graduate Institute of International and Development Studies in Geneva, which he joined in 2008. From 2009 to 2012 he was chair of Development Studies. He is a Founding Fellow of the European Union Development Network (EUDN) and Senior Fellow at the Fondation pour les études et recherches en développement international (FERDI). He was assistant and then associate professor at the University of Montréal, and Professor at the Centre d'Etudes et de Recherches en Développement International (CERDI).
