= Patrick Bolton =

Economist

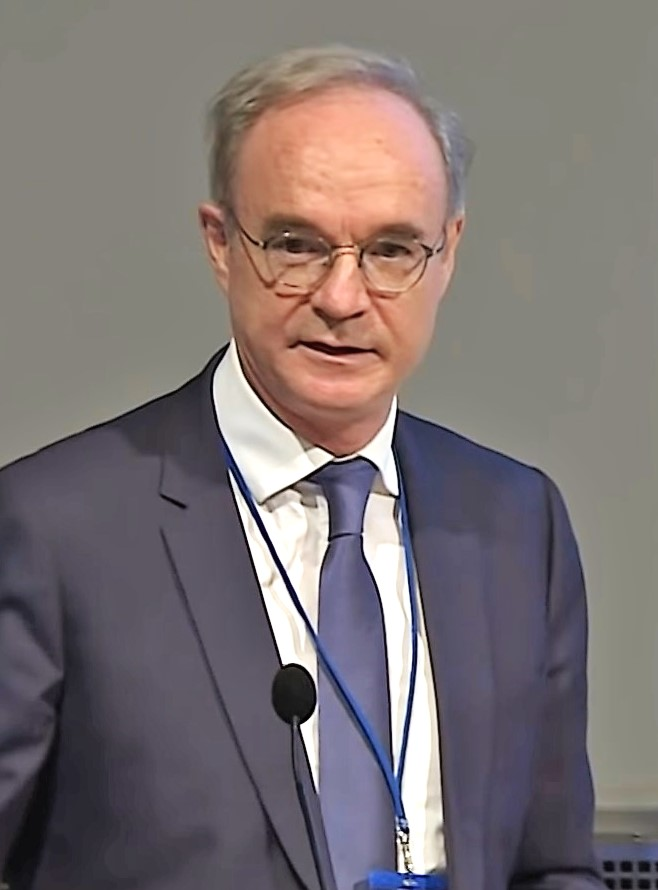
- Bolton speaks in 2018
- Born: June 11, 1957 (age 69); Dublin, Ireland
- Education: University of Cambridge, Institut d'Etudes Politiques de Paris, London School of Economics
- Scientific career
- Fields: Economics
- Workplaces: Columbia Business School, Imperial College London and others

Patrick Bolton (born June 11, 1957, Dublin, Ireland) is the Barbara and David Zalaznick Emeritus Professor of Business at Columbia Business School (2005–present) and a Professor of Finance at Imperial College London (2018–present). He is a past president of the American Finance Association (2015).

Bolton specializes in contract theory and its relationship to corporate finance and industrial organization, in particular the allocation of control and decision rights to contracting parties. He is studying the ways in which institutional investors and financial markets assess and respond to risks from climate change, and how public policy influences corporate behaviour and the actions of institutions.

Bolton has published a number of books, including Contract Theory (2004) with Mathias Dewatripont, Credit Markets for the Poor (2005) with Howard Rosenthal, The Economics of Contracts (2008), Sovereign Wealth Funds and Long-term Investing (2012) with Frederic Samama and Joseph E. Stiglitz and Coping with the Climate Crisis: Mitigation Policies and Global Coordination (2018), with Rabah Arezki, Karim El Aynaoui and Maurice Obstfeld.

== Early life and education ==
Bolton was born on June 11, 1957, in Dublin, Ireland and holds dual French and American nationality. Bolton has a BA in economics from the University of Cambridge and a BA in political science from the Institut d'Etudes Politiques de Paris. He earned his PhD from the London School of Economics in 1986.

== Career ==
Bolton was an assistant professor at the University of California at Berkeley and then joined the economics department at Harvard University (1987–1989). He worked at the C.N.R.S. Laboratoire d' Econométrie de L' Ecole Polytechnique (1989–1991), and was the Cassel Professor of Money and Banking at the London School of Economics (1991–1994). He worked at the Institut d'Etudes Europénnes de l'Université libre de Bruxelles (1994–1998). He was the John H. Scully '66 Professor of Finance and Economics at Princeton University (1998–2005).

Bolton joined the Columbia Business School as the Barbara and David Zalaznick Professor of Business in July 2005. In 2018, he became a visiting professor of finance at Imperial College London.

== Awards ==
- 2021, EAERE Award for ERC Grants Laureates in the field of environmental and resource economics, European Association of Environmental and Resource Economists (EAERE)
- 2018, Louis Bachelier Fellow
- 2016, Fellow, American Finance Association
- 2013, Corresponding Fellow, British Academy
- 2009. Fellow, American Academy of Arts and Sciences
- 1993, Fellow, Econometric Society
