= Nora Lustig =

Argentine economist

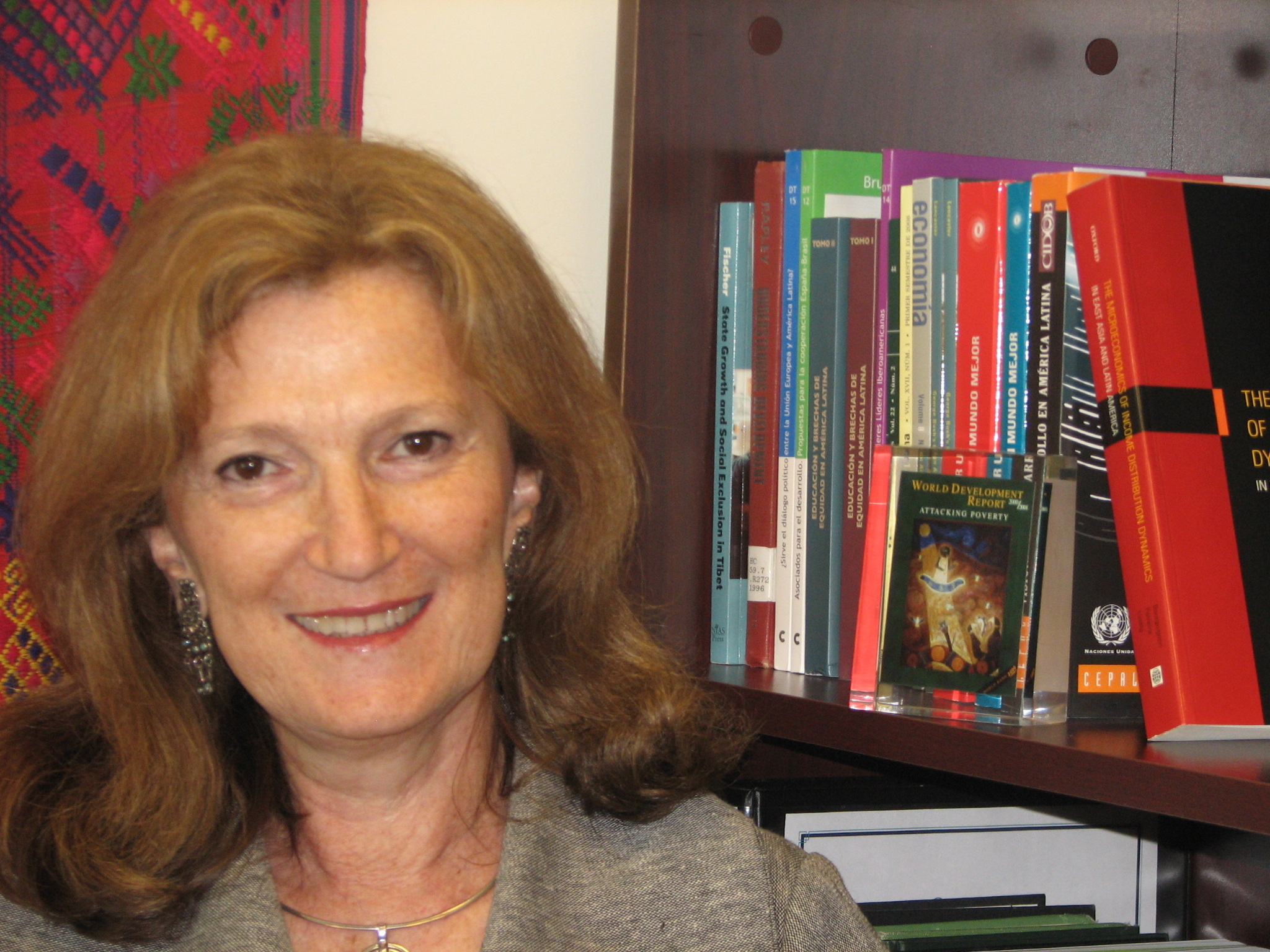
- Born: January 13, 1951 (age 75); Buenos Aires, Argentina

Academic background
- Education: University of California, Berkeley

Academic work
- Discipline: Development economics, inequality and poverty, Latin American economics
- Institutions: Tulane University
- Website: noralustig.tulane.edu; Information at IDEAS / RePEc

Nora Lustig (born January 13, 1951) is an Argentine economist. She is the Samuel Z. Stone Professor of Latin American Economics and the Director of the CEQ Institute at Tulane University, and a non-resident Fellow at the Center for Global Development and the Inter-American Dialogue.

Nora Lustig was born and raised in Buenos Aires, Argentina and has spent most of her adult life in the United States and Mexico. She received her doctorate in economics from the University of California, Berkeley.

== Career and awards ==
Lustig was the lead author of the World Development Report 2000/1 “Attacking Poverty” (World Bank). Analyzing the dynamics of the Mexican economy has been the other main focus of her research. Her study Mexico, the Remaking of an Economy (Brookings Institution, 1992 and 1998) was selected by Choice magazine as an Outstanding Academic Book.

As co-founder and president of LACEA (Latin American and Caribbean Economic Association), she played a pivotal role in the creation and consolidation of the leading association of economists focused on Latin America, the launching of LACEA's journal Economia and the organization of LACEA's Network on Inequality and Poverty. She is affiliated with the Inter-American Dialogue, the Earth Institute and the Institute of Development Studies.

From 2001 to 2005, she served as rector of the University of the Americas (UDLAP) in Puebla, Mexico. She is also a Non-Resident Senior Fellow & a Project Director for the Commitment to Equity at the Inter-American Dialogue.

In 2016 Lustig received the Lawrence M. v. D. Schloss Prize for Excellence in Research.

== Selected publications ==
=== Books ===
- Lustig, Nora, ed. (1998) [1992]. Mexico the remaking of an economy (2nd ed.). Washington, D.C.: Brookings Institution Press. ISBN 9780585259178.
- Lustig, Nora, ed. (1995). Coping with austerity: poverty and inequality in Latin America. Washington, D.C.: Brookings Institution Press. ISBN 9780815753179.
- Lustig, Nora; Edwards, Sebastian, eds. (1997). Labor markets in Latin America combining social protection with market flexibility. Washington, D.C.: Brookings Institution Press. ISBN 9780585341217.
- Lustig, Nora, ed. (2001). Shielding the poor: social protection in the developing world. Washington, D.C.: Brookings Institution Press and the Inter-American Development Bank. ISBN 9780815753216.
- Lustig, Nora; Bourguignon, François; Ferreira, Francisco (2005). The microeconomics of income distribution dynamics: in East Asia and Latin America. Washington, DC New York: World Bank Oxford University Press. ISBN 9780821358610.
- Lustig, Nora; López-Calva, Luis F., eds. (June 2010). Declining inequality in Latin America: a decade of progress?. Washington D.C.: Brookings Institution Press and UNDP. ISBN 9780815704102. Table of contents. Sample chapter. Available online.

=== Tulane economics working paper series ===
Papers for Tulane economics working paper series, Tulane University.

- Lustig, Nora (May 2009). Coping with rising food prices: policy dilemmas in the developing world (PDF). wp0907.
- Lustig, Nora; Gasparini, Leonardo (February 2011). The rise and fall of income inequality in Latin America (PDF). wp1110.
- Lustig, Nora (February 2011). The knowledge bank and poverty reduction (PDF). wp1111.
- Lustig, Nora; Ros, Jamie (February 2011). Latin America's economic challenges: lessons for emerging economies (PDF). wp1112.
- Lustig, Nora; McLeod, Darryl (March 2011). Inequality and poverty under Latin America's new left regimes (PDF). wp1117.
- Lustig, Nora; López-Calva, Luis F.; Ortiz-Juarez, Eduardo (April 2011). The decline in inequality in Latin America: how much, since when and why (PDF). wp1118.
- Lustig, Nora; Birdsall, Nancy; McLeod, Darryl (May 2011). Declining inequality in Latin America: some economics, some politics (PDF). wp1120.
- Lustig, Nora (June 2011). Scholars who became practitioners: the influence of research on the design, evaluation and political survival of Mexico's anti-poverty program Progresa/Oportunidades (PDF). wp1123.
- Lustig, Nora (June 2011). Multidimensional indices of achievements and poverty: what do we gain and what do we (PDF). wp1121.
- Lustig, Nora (July 2011). Commitment to Equity Assessment (CEQ): a diagnostic framework to assess governments' fiscal policies handbook (PDF). wp1122.
- Lustig, Nora; Pessino, Carola; Molina, George Gray; Jimenez, Wilson; Paz, Veronica; Yanez, Ernesto; Pereira, Claudiney; Higgins, Sean (October 2011). Fiscal policy and income redistribution in Latin America: challenging the conventional wisdom (PDF). wp1124.
- Lustig, Nora; Campos, Raymundo; Esquivel, Gerado (January 2012). The rise and fall of income inequality in Mexico, 1989–2010 (PDF). wp1201.

=== Other articles and papers ===
- Lustig, Nora (Fall 2000). "Crises and the poor: socially responsible macroeconomics". Economía, the Journal of the Latin American and Caribbean Economic Association. 1 (1): 1–45. doi:10.1353/eco.2000.0009. SSRN 214994. Pdf.
- Lustig, Nora (Winter 2001). "Life is not easy: Mexico's quest for stability and growth". The Journal of Economic Perspectives. 15 (1): 85–106. doi:10.1257/jep.15.1.85. JSTOR 2696542. Pdf.
- Lustig, Nora (November 2008). "Thought for food: the challenges of coping with soaring food prices". Washington D.C.: Center for Global Development. wp155. Pdf.
