= Carmen Pagés-Serra =

Carmen Pagés-Serra (Barcelona, 1965) is the Chief of the Labor Markets Division of the Inter-American Development Bank (IDB).

== Life ==
Pagés-Serra graduated in economics from the Universitat Autònoma de Barcelona and took her Ph.D. in economics from Boston University.

After working for the World Bank from 2004 to 2006, Pagés-Serra joined the IDB as a principal research economist at the Research Department and led publications such as The Age of Productivity: Transforming Economies from the Bottom Up. She is also the author of the book Law and Employment: Lessons from Latin America and the Caribbean jointly with the Nobel Laureate Prof. James Heckman and Job Creation in Latin America and the Caribbean: Recent Trends and Policy Challenges).

She has published extensively in leading academic and policy journals in the areas of labor markets, social security and productivity.
