= Rnn (software) =

Machine Learning framework written in the R language

rnn
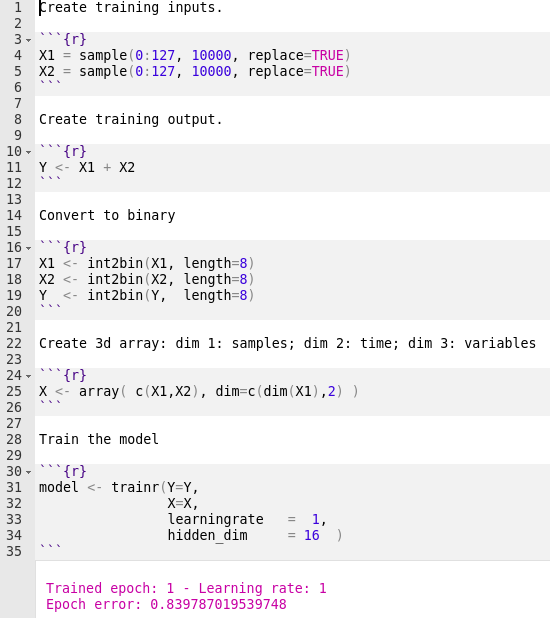
- Original author: Bastiaan Quast
- Release: 30 November 2015
- Stable release: 1.9.0 / 22 April 2023; 3 years ago
- Preview release: 1.9.0.9000 / 22 April 2023; 3 years ago
- Written in: R
- Operating system: macOS, Linux, Windows
- Size: 564.2 kB (v. 1.9.0)
- License: GPL v3
- Website: cran.r-project.org/web/packages/rnn/
- Repository: github.com/bquast/rnn

rnn is an open-source machine learning framework that implements recurrent neural network architectures, such as LSTM and GRU, natively in the R programming language, that has been downloaded over 100,000 times (from the RStudio servers alone).

The rnn package is distributed through the Comprehensive R Archive Network under the open-source GPL v3 license.

== Workflow ==
Demonstration of RNN package

The below example from the rnn documentation show how to train a recurrent neural network to solve the problem of bit-by-bit binary addition.

> # install the rnn package, including the dependency sigmoid
> install.packages('rnn')

> # load the rnn package
> library(rnn)

> # create input data 
> X1 = sample(0:127, 10000, replace=TRUE)
> X2 = sample(0:127, 10000, replace=TRUE)

> # create output data
> Y <- X1 + X2

> # convert from decimal to binary notation 
> X1 <- int2bin(X1, length=8)
> X2 <- int2bin(X2, length=8)
> Y  <- int2bin(Y,  length=8)

> # move input data into single tensor
> X <- array( c(X1,X2), dim=c(dim(X1),2) )

> # train the model
> model <- trainr(Y=Y,
+                 X=X,
+                 learningrate   =  1,
+                 hidden_dim     = 16  )
Trained epoch: 1 - Learning rate: 1
Epoch error: 0.839787019539748

== sigmoid ==
The sigmoid functions and derivatives used in the package were originally included in the package, from version 0.8.0 onwards, these were released in a separate R package sigmoid, with the intention to enable more general use. The sigmoid package is a dependency of the rnn package and therefore automatically installed with it.

== Reception ==
With the release of version 0.3.0 in April 2016 the use in production and research environments became more widespread. The package was reviewed several months later on the R blog The Beginner Programmer as "R provides a simple and very user friendly package named rnn for working with recurrent neural networks.", which further increased usage.

The book Neural Networks in R by Balaji Venkateswaran and Giuseppe Ciaburro uses rnn to demonstrate recurrent neural networks to R users. It is also used in the r-exercises.com course "Neural network exercises".

The RStudio CRAN mirror download logs show that the package is downloaded on average about 2,000 per month from those servers, with a total of over 100,000 downloads since the first release, according to RDocumentation.org, this puts the package in the 15th percentile of most popular R packages.
