= Nada al-Nashif =

Jordanian public servant

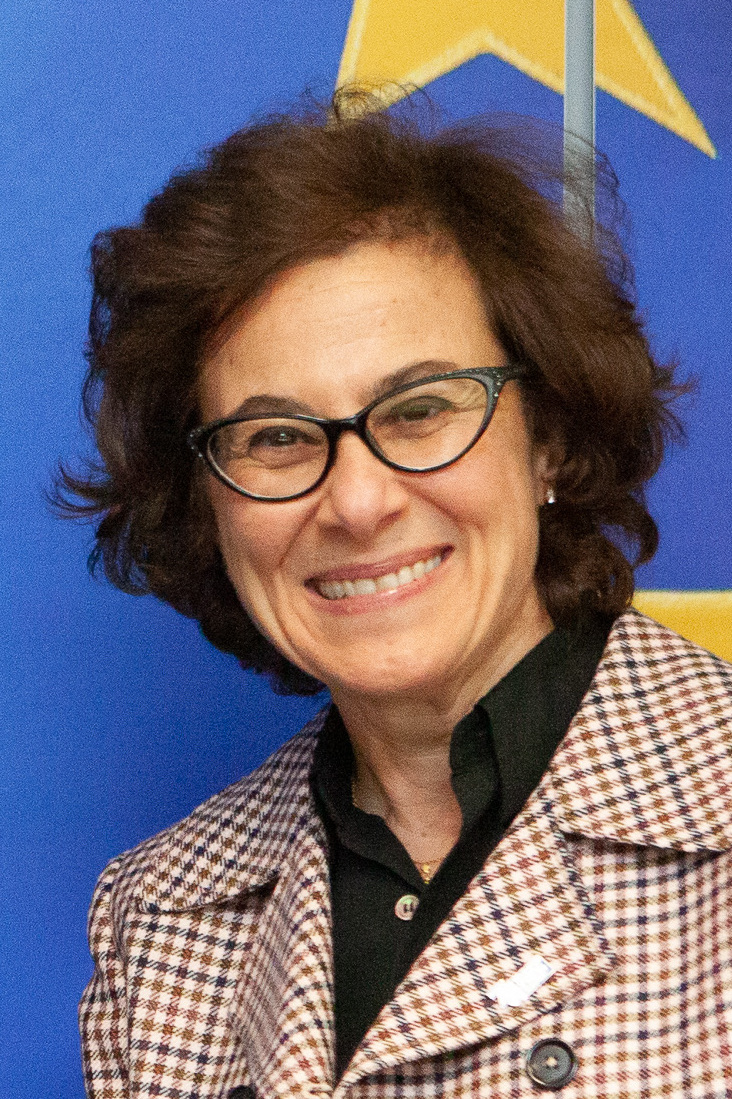
Nada al-Nashif in 2023

Nada al-Nashif (Arabic: ندى الناشف, romanized: Nadā an-Nāšif) is a Jordanian public servant who has been appointed as Deputy High Commissioner for Human Rights from January 2020. From 2015 until 2019, she served as Assistant Director-General for Social and Human Sciences at UNESCO.

== Early life and education ==
Al-Nashif received a Bachelor of Arts with a major in philosophy, politics and economics from the University of Oxford Balliol College in 1987 and a Master in Public Policy from Harvard University in 1991.

== Career ==
Al-Nashif began her UN career at United Nations Development Programme, where she worked from 1991 to 2006. She was Assistant Director-General/Regional Director of the International Labour Organization's Regional Office for Arab States from 2007 to 2014.

She was seriously injured in the 2003 Canal Hotel bombing in Baghdad, which killed at least 22 people, including the United Nations' Special Representative in Iraq Sérgio Vieira de Mello, and wounded over 100, including human rights lawyer and political activist, Amin Mekki Medani. On 7 July 2021, Al-Nashif spoke on the 47th Session of the United Nations Human Rights Council about promoting human rights through sport, the Olympic ideal and the impact of the COVID-19 pandemic on sport.

== Other activities ==
Al-Nashif serves on the Board of Trustees of Birzeit University and Taawon, a human development NGO. She is the author of several articles with a focus on human rights topics.
