= Richard Baldwin (economist) =

American economist

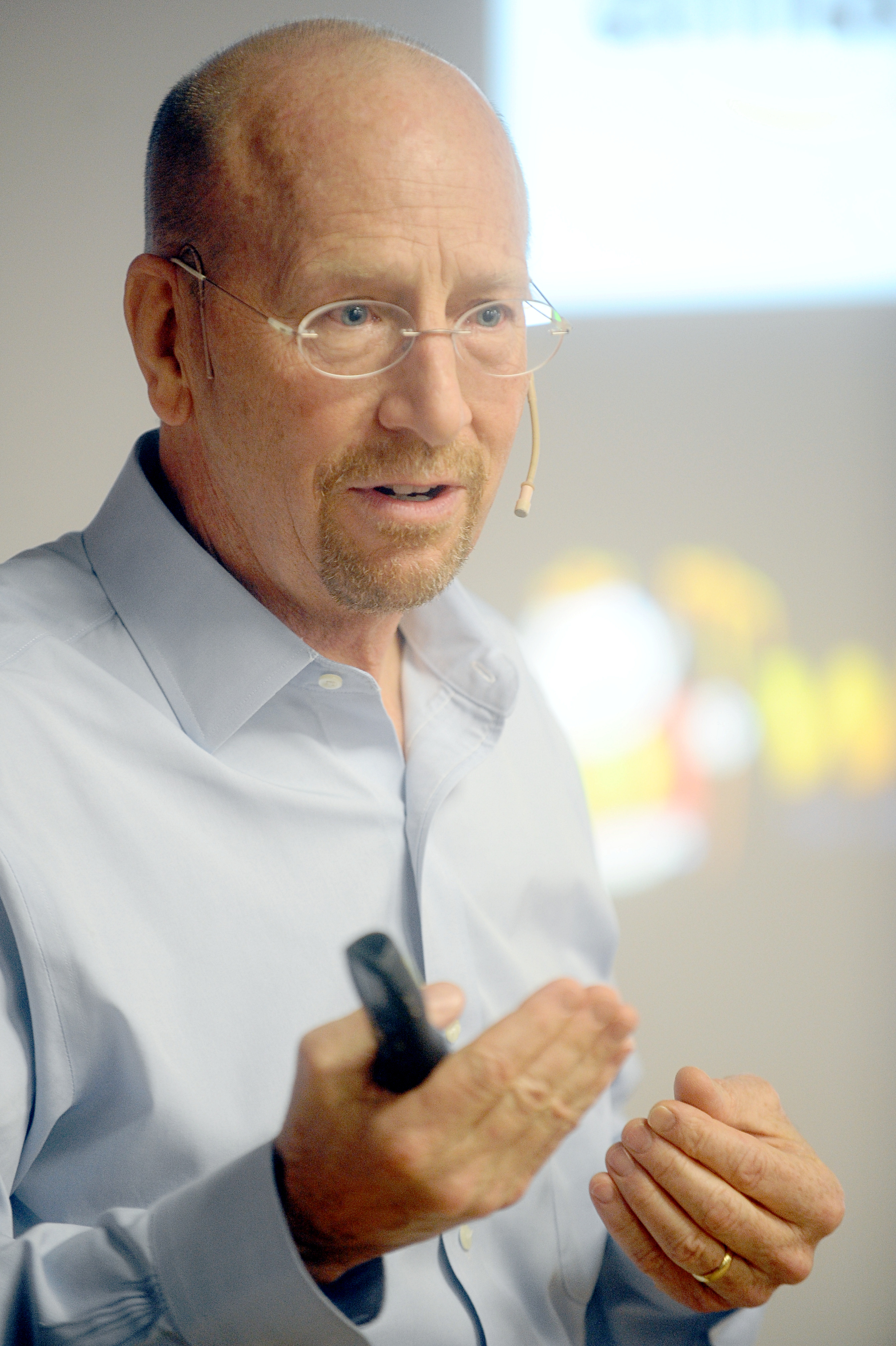
- Born: United States of America
- Citizenship: Swiss

Academic background
- Education: University of Wisconsin-Madison (BS); London School of Economics (MSc); Massachusetts Institute of Technology (PhD)
- Doctoral advisor: Paul Krugman

Academic work
- Discipline: International Economics
- Institutions: IMD Business School; Columbia Business School; Geneva Graduate Institute
- Awards: Doctor honoris causa Pontificia Universidad Católica del Perú (PUCP) 2014; University of St. Gallen 2012; Turku School of Economics and Business Administration 2005.
- Website: Information at IDEAS / RePEc

Richard E. Baldwin is a professor of international economics at the IMD Business School. He was Editor-in-Chief of VoxEU.org, which he founded in June 2007, up to January 2026 and was President of the Centre for Economic Policy Research (CEPR) from 2014 to 2018. He is a research associate at the National Bureau of Economic Research and was twice elected as a Member of the Council of the European Economic Association. Baldwin has been called "one of the most important thinkers in this era of global disruption".

== Career ==
After obtaining a bachelor's degree in economics from the University of Wisconsin–Madison in 1980, he received a master's degree from the London School of Economics in 1981. He completed his PhD at MIT in 1986 under the guidance of Paul Krugman, with whom he has co-authored half a dozen articles. He received honorary doctorates from the Turku School of Economics (Finland), University of St. Gallen (Switzerland) and Pontifical Catholic University of Peru (PUCP). The International Economic Association made him a Schumpeter-Haberler Distinguished Fellow in 2021.

He was professor of international economics at the Geneva Graduate Institute (1991–2023), associate professor (1989–1991) and assistant professor (1986–1989) at Columbia University Business School. In 1990–1991 he followed trade matters for the President's Council of Economic Advisors in the Bush Sr White House. He worked as an Associate Economic Affairs Officer for UNCTAD in the early 1980s. He has also been a visiting research professor at MIT (2003), Oxford (2012–2015), and an Associate Member of Nuffield College at Oxford University. He has consulted for many governments and international organisations including the EU, the OECD, the World Bank, EFTA, and USAID.

== Research ==
He has published extensively in the areas of globalisation, international trade, regionalism, WTO, European integration, economic geography, political economy and growth, and is recognised as an expert on the economic drivers and risks of globalisation. His first book for a wider audience, The Great Convergence: Information Technology and the New Globalization, was published in November 2016 and listed among the Best Books of 2016 by The Financial Times and The Economist magazine. It was translated into nine languages. He also writes extensively on current economic policy. He has over 71,000 Google Scholar cites and an H-index of over 100.

His 2019 book, The Globotics Upheaval: Globalization, Robotics and the Future of Work, addresses the role of digital technology in driving both globalisation and automation of service and professional jobs in advanced economies; it has been translated into six languages. With Charles Wyplosz, he has a leading textbook on the Economics of European Integration, which is in its 7th Edition with McGraw-Hill.

More recently, he has written two eBooks on Donald Trump's trade policy since January 2025. The first most recent, in April 2026, World War Trade: Conflict, Containment, and the Emergent World Trading System, examines how world trade has been weaponised, how domestic forces contained President Trump's aggressive tariffs, and how the rest of the world is rebuilding a new trading order on autopilot, driven by the domino theory of regionalism. The first one, in May 2025, The Trade Hack: How Trump's trade war fails and the world moves on, explains how Trump’s 2025 tariff blitz was guided by grievance politics rather than standard economic policy goals. Tariffs won’t fix the US economy but could fracture the global trade system. Blending sharp analysis with policy insight, the book maps out three futures for world trade and urges global leaders to defend the rules by following them. The system can survive even thrive if world leaders step up.

He co-edited Economics in the Time of COVID-19 (2020) with Beatrice Weder di Mauro, a volume that brings together contributions from leading economists to analyse the potential economic impact of the COVID-19 pandemic, including the speed and scale of economic disruption, the mechanisms of economic contagion, and the likely duration of the downturn. It also examines policy responses, focusing on measures governments could take to mitigate the economic consequences of the crisis.

=== Selected books ===
- Baldwin, Richard, Towards an Integrated Europe, CEPR Press, 1994. ISBN 1898128138
- Baldwin, Richard E., and J. Francois, Dynamic Issues in Commercial Policy Analysis. Cambridge University Press, 1999. ISBN 978-0521159517
- Baldwin, R., D. Cohen, A. Sapir, and A. Venables (1999). Market Integration, Regionalism and the Global Economy. Cambridge University. ISBN 9780155016194
- Baldwin, R. and Aymo Brunetti (2001). Economic Impact of EU Membership on Entrants: New Methods and Issues. Springer. ISBN 9780792375746
- Baldwin, R., Forslid, R., Martin, P., Ottaviano, G., & Robert-Nicoud, F. (2011). Economic geography and public policy. Princeton University Press. ISBN 9780691123110
- Baldwin, R. Mashiro Kawai, Ganeshan Wignaraja (2015). A World Trade Organization for the 21st Century: The Asian Perspective. Edward Elgar Publishing. ISBN 9781783479276
- Baldwin, R. and C. Wyplosz (2016). The Economics of European Integration. McGraw-Hill Inc. ISBN 9780077169657
- Baldwin, R. (2016). The Great Convergence, Harvard University Press. ISBN 9780674237841
- Baldwin, R. (2019). The Globotics Upheaval : Globalization, Robotics, and the Future of Work. Oxford University Press. ISBN 978-0190901769
- Baldwin, R. (2025). The Great Trade Hack: How Trump's trade war fails and the world moves on. CEPR Press. ISBN 978-1-912179-92-3
- Baldwin, R. (2026). World War Trade: Conflict, containment, and the emergent world trading order. CEPR Press. ISBN 978-1-917343-02-2
