= Centre for Economic Policy Research =

European economic research network based in London

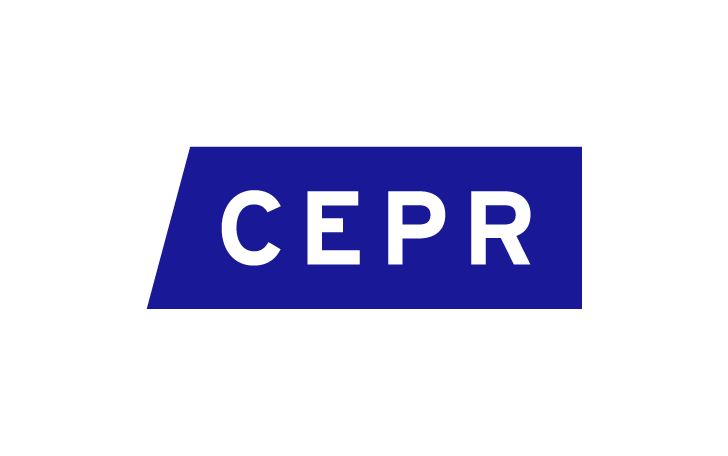

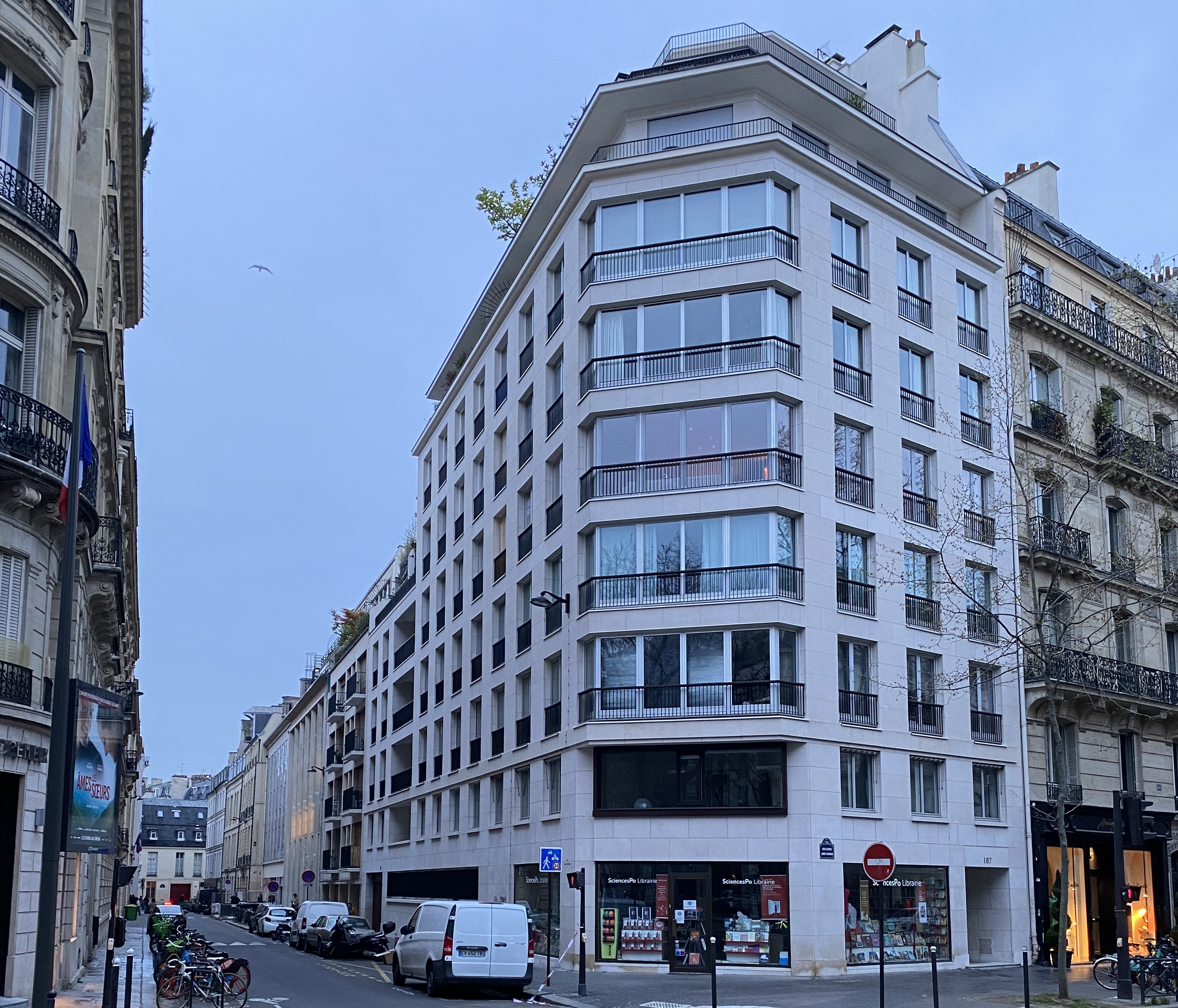
- Paris headquarters of the CEPR at 187 boulevard Saint-Germain
- Formation: 26 May 1983; 43 years ago
- Founder: Richard Portes
- Headquarters: Paris, France
- Fields: Economics
- Official language: English
- President: Beatrice Weder di Mauro
- Website: cepr.org

The Centre for Economic Policy Research (CEPR) is an independent, non-partisan, pan-European non-profit organisation. According to the Charity Commission for England and Wales, "CEPR's mission is to promote world-class economic research and deliver the policy-relevant results to decision-makers. It provides common services for its network of researchers and for users of its research, and obtains funding for the activities it develops, executing projects once funding is obtained, and reporting to donors on activities undertaken".

== History ==
CEPR was founded in 1983 by Richard Portes with the aim of enhancing the quality of economic policy-making in Europe and beyond. Richard Baldwin, currently Professor of International Economics at IMD Business School, served as CEPR's President from 2014 to 2018 and was also the founding Editor-in-Chief of VoxEU, a role he held until December 2018.

Since 2018, CEPR has been led by Beatrice Weder di Mauro, who serves as its President.

In October 2021, CEPR opened a new office in Paris, which was intended to become its head office. The Paris office is hosted by Sciences Po, one of CEPR's Paris Founding Partners, alongside the AXA, the Bank of France, the French Ministry of Higher Education, Research and Innovation, the French Ministry of Economy and Finance, and the Île-de-France Region. Weder di Mauro commented that CEPR "is an organisation with a strong European identity and, with Brexit, we felt the need to set ourselves up on the continent."

== Activity ==
CEPR appoints Research Fellows and Affiliates who remain based at their home institutions, including universities, research institutes, central bank research departments, and international organisations. As of 2025, CEPR's network comprised more than 2,000 economists from over 330 institutions across 30 countries. Research produced by this network is disseminated through a wide range of channels, including publications, public meetings, workshops, and conferences.

CEPR organises conferences, workshops, and meetings focused on economic research and policy issues.

=== Discussion Papers ===
Research by CEPR Research Fellows and Affiliates is first circulated through the CEPR Discussion Paper series. These papers are distributed widely among specialists in the research and policy communities, ensuring that findings receive prompt and rigorous professional scrutiny. The Centre produces more than 1,000 Discussion Papers each year and maintains an archive of over 20,000 papers. As of December 2025, the CEPR Discussion Paper series ranked third among all economics working paper series worldwide in terms of total downloads, according to the RePEc database.

=== VoxEU ===
VoxEU is CEPR's online policy portal. It was launched in June 2007 by Richard Baldwin with the aim of "publishing research-based policy analysis and commentary by economists". Its intended audience includes economists in academia, public institutions, and the private sector, as well as journalists and students.

The portal publishes short articles ("columns") covering a wide range of topics in economics. Contributions are typically written by academic researchers and policy economists and draw on recent research findings. VoxEU content spans multiple subfields of economics, including macroeconomics, international trade, public finance, labour economics, climate economics, and technological change.

During periods of major economic and policy debate—such as the global financial crisis, the euro area crisis, and the COVID-19 pandemic—the portal has published commentary related to these developments. VoxEU articles are disseminated digitally and are accessible without charge.

The editor-in-chief of VoxEU is Antonio Fatás, who assumed the role in January 2026.

Its role in policy debate has been discussed in external commentary, including by Clive Crook in his blog.

=== CEPR Paris Symposium ===
Since CEPR established its headquarters in Paris, the Paris Symposium has become its flagship annual event for global economic research and is regularly attended by researchers and policymakers. This week-long event brings together the entire CEPR network, including Research Fellows and Affiliates, associate researchers from the Research and Policy Networks, Distinguished Fellows, and a wide range of international policymakers.

Each RPN and Programme area is responsible for organising part of the Symposium programme, while participants are free to attend sessions across different fields. This structure fosters a highly interdisciplinary environment and enables the Symposium to address major themes that cut across the economics profession.

=== Geneva Report ===
Since 1999, CEPR has published the Geneva Reports on the World Economy as a joint annual project with the International Center for Monetary and Banking Studies, an independent foundation associated with the Geneva Graduate Institute.

=== Paris Report ===
In 2022, CEPR launched the Paris Reports, an annual flagship publication modelled on the Geneva Reports on the World Economy and Barcelona Reports, which address topics of common European economic interest.

== See also ==
- National Bureau of Economic Research
- Bruegel (think tank)
