= Debt-to-GDP ratio =

Economic assessment of a country's debt

Government debt-to-GDP ratio as % in 2024 by IMF >100% >75–100% >50–75% >25–50% 0–25% no data

In economics, the debt-to-GDP ratio is the ratio of a country's accumulation of government debt (measured in units of currency) to its gross domestic product (GDP) (measured in units of currency per year). A low debt-to-GDP ratio indicates that an economy produces goods and services sufficient to pay back debts without incurring further debt. Geopolitical and economic considerations – including interest rates, war, recessions, and other variables – influence the borrowing practices of a nation and the choice to incur further debt. Economists and international institutions caution that there is no universally agreed "safe" or "dangerous" debt-to-GDP threshold; the sustainability of public debt depends on factors such as growth prospects, interest rates, and fiscal institutions.

It should not be confused with a deficit-to-GDP ratio, which, for countries running budget deficits, measures a country's annual net fiscal loss in a given year (government budget balance, or the net change in debt per annum) as a percentage share of that country's GDP; for countries running budget surpluses, a surplus-to-GDP ratio measures a country's annual net fiscal gain as a share of that country's GDP.

Particularly in macroeconomics, various debt-to-GDP ratios can be calculated. The most commonly used ratio is the government debt divided by the gross domestic product (GDP), which reflects the government's finances, while another common ratio is the total debt to GDP, which reflects the finances of the nation as a whole.

== Statistics ==
Heatmap of the development of debt-to-GDP ratio for some European countries, in percent of GDP from 1995 to 2017

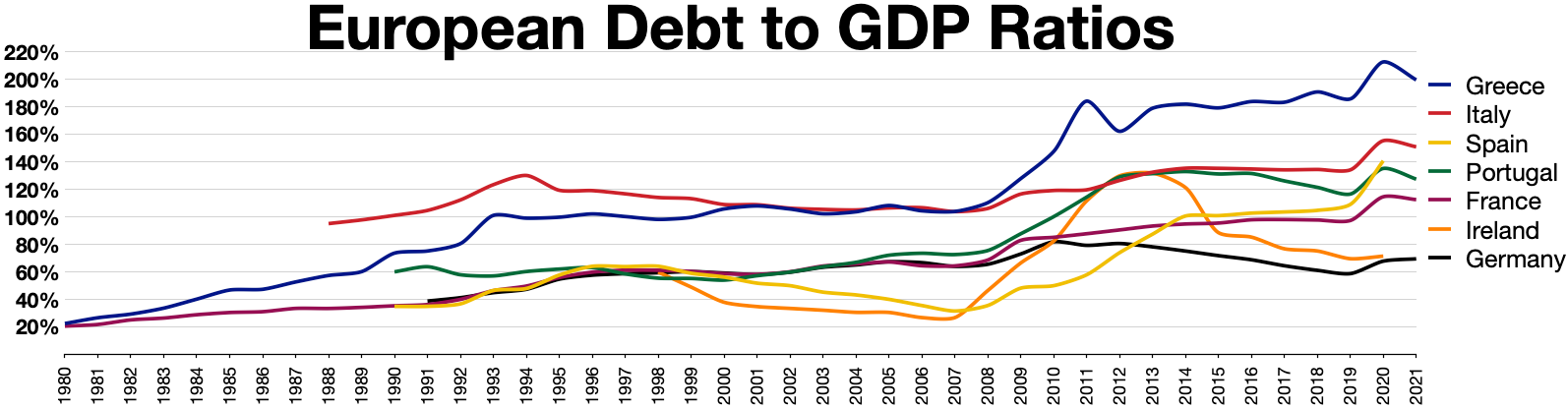
European debt to GDP ratios: Greece Italy Spain Portugal / France Ireland Germany

According to the IMF World Economic Outlook Database (April 2021), the level of Gross Government debt-to-GDP ratio in Canada was 116.3%, in China 66.8%, in India 89.6%, in Germany 70.3%, in France 115.2% and in the United States 132.8%.

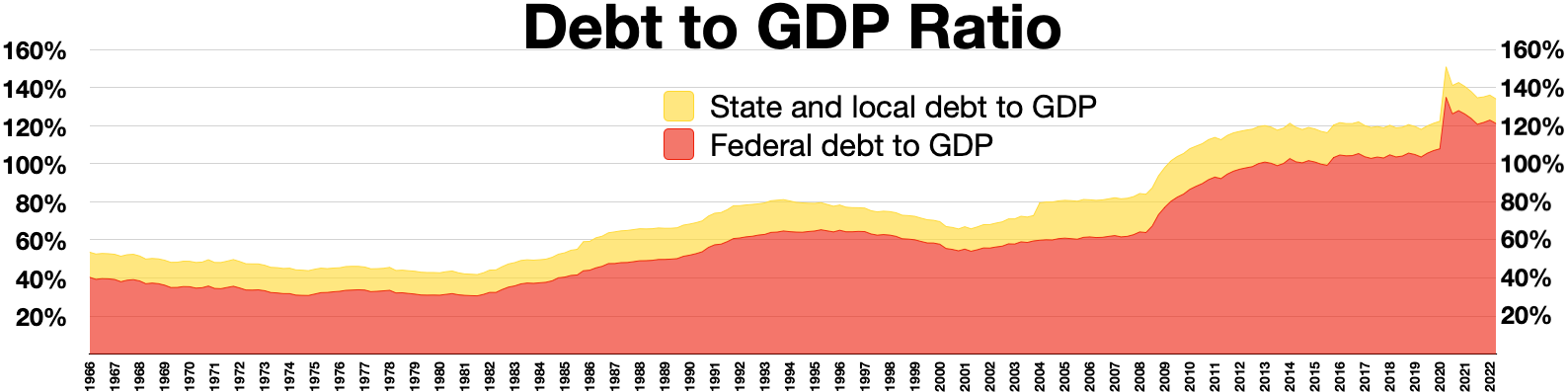
Debt to GDP for the United States State and local debt to GDP Federal debt to GDP

At the end of the 1st quarter of 2021, the United States public debt-to-GDP ratio was 127.5%. Two-thirds of US public debt is owned by US citizens, banks, corporations, and the Federal Reserve Bank; approximately one-third of US public debt is held by foreign countries – particularly China and Japan. In comparison, less than 5% of Italian and Japanese public debt is held by foreign countries.

== Applications ==
Debt-to-GDP measures the financial leverage of an economy.

One of the Euro convergence criteria was that government debt-to-GDP should be below 60%.

According to these two institutions, external debt sustainability can be obtained by a country "by bringing the net present value (NPV) of external public debt down to about 150 percent of a country's exports or 250 percent of a country's revenues". High external debt is believed to have harmful effects on an economy. The United Nations Sustainable Development Goal 17, an integral part of the 2030 Agenda has a target to address the external debt of highly indebted poor countries to reduce debt distress.

In 2013 Herndon, Ash, and Pollin reviewed an influential, widely cited research paper entitled, "Growth in a Time of Debt", by two Harvard economists Carmen Reinhart and Kenneth Rogoff. Herndon, Ash and Pollin argued that "coding errors, selective exclusion of available data, and unconventional weighting of summary statistics lead to serious errors that inaccurately represent the relationship between public debt and GDP growth among 20 advanced economies in the post-war period". Correcting these basic computational errors undermined the central claim of the book that too much debt causes recession. Rogoff and Reinhardt claimed that their fundamental conclusions were accurate, despite the errors.

There is a difference between external debt denominated in domestic currency, and external debt denominated in foreign currency. A nation can service external debt denominated in domestic currency by tax revenues, but to service foreign currency debt it has to convert tax revenues in the foreign exchange market to foreign currency, which puts downward pressure on the value of its currency.

== Changes ==
The change of debt-to-GDP ratio can be represented as:

$$\frac{B_t}{Y_t} - \frac{B_{t-1}}{Y_{t-1}}=(r-g)\left(\frac{B_{t-1}}{Y_{t-1}}\right)+\left(\frac{G_t-T_t}{Y_t}\right),$$
where $\frac{B_t}{Y_t}$ is the debt-to-GDP at the end of the period t, and $\frac{B_{t-1}}{Y_{t-1}}$ is the debt-to-GDP ratio at the end of the previous period (t−1). The left side of the equation shows the change in the debt-to-GDP ratio. The right hand side of the equation separates the effect of real interest rate $r$ and economic growth $g$ on previous debt-to-GDP, and the new debt or government budget balance-to-GDP ratio$\frac{G_t-T_t}{Y_t}$.

If the government has the ability of money creation, and therefore monetizing debt the change in debt-to-GDP ratio becomes:

$$\left(\frac{B_t}{Y_t} - \frac{B_{t-1}}{Y_{t-1}}\right)=(r-g)\left(\frac{B_{t-1}}{Y_{t-1}}\right)+\left(\frac{G_t-T_t}{Y_t}\right)-\left(\frac{M_t}{Y_t}-\frac{M_{t-1}}{Y_{t-1}}\right)$$

The term $\frac{M_t}{Y_t}-\frac{M_{t-1}}{Y_{t-1}}$ is the change in money supply-to-GDP ratio. The effect that an increase in nominal money balances has on seigniorage is ambiguous, as while it increases the amount of money within the economy, the real value of each unit of money decreases due to inflationary effects. This inflationary effect from money printing is called an inflation tax.

== See also ==
- Debt crisis
  - European debt crisis (2009–2018)
- Debt ratio, for companies
- Debt Sustainability Analysis
- Debt-to-income ratio, for households
- Deficit spending
- Economic bubble
- Fiscal sustainability
- Heavily indebted poor countries
- Leverage (finance)
- List of countries by external debt
- List of countries by government budget
- List of countries by tax revenue
- Unfunded mandate
  - Pensions crisis
