= Political Economy Research Institute =

Research institute in Massachusetts

Coordinates: 42°23′5.6″N 72°31′19.7″W

The Political Economy Research Institute (PERI) is an independent research unit at the University of Massachusetts Amherst. According to its mission statement, it "...promotes human and ecological well-being through our original research". PERI was established in 1998 by co-directors Robert Pollin and Gerald Epstein, both economists at the university. Funding for its foundation came from Pollin and his father, Abe Pollin.

== Toxic 100 ==
PERI's Toxic 100 list includes one hundred United States companies ranked by the amount of greenhouse gases, air pollution and water pollution produced and the relative toxicity of the pollutants, as determined by PERI at the University of Massachusetts Amherst.

The Greenhouse 100 Suppliers Index ranks companies by 2019 direct emissions from large sources. The top three companies are Vistra Energy, Duke Energy, and Southern Company, continuing a three-year period in which these were in the top three. They each released more than 85 million metric tons of CO_{2}-equivalent emissions. Together, these three companies released 4% of all U.S. greenhouse gas emissions from all sources including non-energy sources. Other top 10 companies in the Greenhouse 100 are Berkshire Hathaway, American Electric Power, Xcel Energy, Energy Capital Partners, NextEra Energy, and Exxon Mobil, with the U.S. government ranking 6th.

The Toxic 100 Air Polluters Index reports that the top 10 2019 companies in terms of total potential chronic human health risk are Boeing, LyondellBasell, Huntsman, Linde, BASF, Dow Inc., Celanese, Assa Abloy, Baker Hughes, and Eastman Chemical.

The Toxic 100 Water Polluters Index ranks the pounds of toxics released into surface water or sent to water-treatment systems, adjusted for chemical toxicity. Northrop Grumman, Dow Inc., LyondellBasell, Celanese, and Canopus International top the Toxic 100 Water Index.

Toxic 100 air pollution scores are calculated by the formula:

Emissions x Toxicity x Population Exposure

Emissions are measured in millions of pounds. Population exposure is based on the proximity of nearby residents, and factors such as prevailing winds and height of smokestacks. Toxicity is calculated from the Risk-Screening Environmental Indicators by the United States Environmental Protection Agency.
