= Russia and the World Bank =

The Russian Federation joined the World Bank after the collapse of the Soviet Union, which led to the formation of a new state and economy as a constitutional republic. The federation joined the World Bank on June 16, 1992. Since then, Russian projects funded by the World Bank have ranged from public administration and law to energy development and fishing. On March 2, 2022, the World Bank halted all programs in Russia as well as Belarus due to the invasion of Ukraine.

== Contributions and needs ==
According to the World Bank, Russia experienced a period of strong economic growth during the 2000s. By 2012, growth has slowed along with the pace of reform. Russia must address key constraints to productivity growth, such as the remaining weaknesses in the investment climate, the lack of sufficient competition, barriers to infrastructure connectivity, companies' relatively-low innovation capacity and the mismatch between available skills and those demanded by the labor market. Improving the health of the population and the access to and quality by the labor market. Improving public health and access to quality education are also essential. Strengthening governance at all levels and ensuring fiscal and environmental sustainability must underlie these efforts. Progress is critical for Russia to return to sustainable growth and expansion of shared prosperity across the country. The World Bank outlined three requirements for Russian sustainability: governance, maintaining fiscal sustainability and better management of environmental and natural resources.

In 2011, Russia committed as much as $150 million to the World Bank. In March 2012, Russia established the Eurasian Center for Food Security (ECFS). Hosted by Moscow State University, the center offers education programs and policy and technical recommendations for improved agricultural performance, sustainable rural development and natural-resources management. According to their website, the ECFS has a vision of Food security through sustainable management of natural resources and market regulation. Its mission statement aims to "encourage and coordinate collective action to strengthening food security in Eurasia through research and development".

Since 2018 the chief of the Russian mission to the World Bank is Roman Marshavin.

== The World Bank and economic growth in Russia ==
In a report published in 2016, the level of poverty would soon reach 2007 levels as the Russian economy continued to contract and purchasing power was eroded by inflation. The number of poor people in Russia was expected to rise to over 20 million (out of a population of just over 140 million), and the government would have difficulty combating rising poverty due to the collapse of global oil prices. The price of oil had fallen to under $40 per barrel, almost one-third of its 2014 price. According to the World Bank, serious structural reform (which it has long said are needed to ensure sustainable economic growth) were not likely before the 2018 presidential election.

In 2017, the World Bank updated its criteria for measuring the poverty headcount ratio, a crucial indicator used to assess the percentage of the population living below the poverty line. By 2020, this revised methodology indicated that Russia's poverty headcount ratio had reached 0. This suggests that, according to the World Bank's updated standards, no individuals in Russia were living below the international poverty line as defined by these criteria.

While Russia's per capita income has surpassed the World Bank's poverty line, there are still about 9 percent of the population whose incomes are below the poverty line set by Russia, according to Russian Rosstat, cited by Reuters.

According to the Moscow Times, The World Bank has reclassified Russia as a "high-income" country, with a per-capita gross national income (GNI) of $14,250 in 2023. This upgrade reflects increases in Russia's economic activities, including a significant rise in military-related spending, trade, the financial sector, and construction. These factors contributed to a 3.6% increase in real GDP and an 11.2% growth in GNI per capita. The World Bank's threshold for high-income countries in 2024–25 is set at $14,005 or more, placing Russia among these nations.

== Active projects in Russia ==
On June 13, 2017, there were nine active projects in Russia and 10 more related to a new pipeline. The projects involved public administration, law and justice, agriculture, fishing and forestry, and energy and mining.

The World Bank initially announced that it had halted all its projects in Russia following the country's 2014 annexation of the Crimean Peninsula. This decision was part of a broader international response to the geopolitical crisis. However, it was later disclosed that the World Bank undertook a total of 11 new projects in Russia during the years 2018–2019. This continuation of activities occurred despite the organization's earlier statements and the ongoing political tensions surrounding the situation in Crimea. The projects covered various sectors and raised questions about the consistency of international responses to the geopolitical conflict.

The last World Bank project in Russia was the Integrated Environmental Monitoring Project. The Project Development Objective (PDO) aims to enhance the capacity of national and selected regional authorities to generate and disseminate high-quality, reliable environmental monitoring data. This project focuses on improving the accessibility of environmental information for both public and private sector users. It seeks to achieve these goals by increasing the efficiency of state environmental monitoring systems. This will be accomplished by introducing international standards, enhancing existing monitoring subsystems, and integrating these systems into a unified information and analytical platform. The project is designed to ensure that the environmental data provided is comprehensive, consistent, and meets international benchmarks, thereby supporting better decision-making and policy development. This project was last updated on July 31, 2023, with a final status of begin negotiation.

On March 2, 2022, the World Bank Group has stopped all its programs in Russia and Belarus with immediate effect following Russian invasion of Ukraine.
