= Generational accounting =

Method of measuring the fiscal burdens facing current and future generations

Generational accounting is a method of measuring the fiscal burdens facing current and future generations. Generational accounting considers how much each adult generation, on a per person basis, is likely to pay in future taxes net of transfer payments, over the rest of their lives.

Laurence Kotlikoff's individual and co-authored work on the relativity of fiscal language demonstrates that conventional fiscal measures, including the government's deficit, are not well defined from the perspective of economic theory. Instead, their measurement reflects economically arbitrary fiscal labeling conventions.

"Economics labeling problem," as Kotlikoff calls it, has led to gross misreadings of the fiscal positions of different countries. This starts with the United States, which has a relatively small debt-to-GDP ratio, but is, arguably, in worse fiscal shape than any developed country. Kotlikoff's identification of economics labeling problem, beginning with his 1984 Deficit Delusion article in The Public Interest led him to push for generational accounting, a term he coined and that provides the title for his 1993 book, Generational Accounting.

== History ==
In 1991, Kotlikoff, together with Alan Auerbach and Jagadeesh Gokhale, produced the first set of generational accounts for the United States. Their study demonstrated a major fiscal gap separating future government spending commitments and its means of paying for those commitments, portending dramatic increases in the lifetime net tax burdens facing young and future generations. The generational accounting and fiscal gap accounting developed by Auerbach, Gokhale, and Kotlikoff has become an increasingly standard means of assessing the sustainability of fiscal policy and how different countries intend to treat their next generations. Recent generational accounting by the International Monetary Fund and fiscal gap accounting by Kotlikoff confirm the truly severe long-run fiscal problems facing the US.

Aggregating these remaining lifetime net tax payments of adults and subtracting them from the fiscal gap reveals how much today's and tomorrow's children must pay to resolve the country's fiscal gap if current adults don't pay more, on net. This residual burden facing today's and tomorrow's children is allocated to them in proportion to their projected levels of lifetime labor income. I.e., if each successive generation of children is expected to experience, on average, a 1 percent higher level of lifetime earners, generational accounting allocates to successive generations net lifetime tax payments that are 1 percent higher.

Neither fiscal gap accounting nor generational accounting are perfect measures of fiscal sustainability. Neither suffers from economics severe labeling problem. But both raise the thorny issue of how to discount future taxes and transfers when they are uncertain. The Social Security Trustees Report, in Table IVB6, provides an infinite horizon fiscal gap analysis each year for the Social Security System by itself in which the actuaries use a 3 percent real discount rate. The size of the fiscal gap can be sensitive to the choice of the discount rate. But so is the size of the present value of future GDP against which it is compared. Hence, the ratio of the fiscal gap to the present value of GDP is much less sensitive to the choice of discount rate. It is this ratio that determines what adjustment is needed to eliminate the fiscal gap. In the US case, the fiscal gap is now 12 percent of the present value of GDP, suggesting that an immediate and permanent fiscal adjustment equal to 12 percent of GDP would be required to eliminate the fiscal gap.

== Criticism ==
Fiscal gap and generational accounting have their critics. Some commentators believe the government faces no intertemporal budget, which is the foundation of the fiscal gap and generational accounting frameworks. They believe the government can meet its obligations by either cutting taxes and raising spending to stimulate the economy by enough such that the endogeneous increase in taxes will more than pay for the initial loss in net revenues.

Other critics believe generational accounting is based on specious arguments and a fundamental misunderstanding of government debt. One such critique of generational accounting was published in 2009, stating that, "There is no evidence, nor any economic theory, behind the proposition that government’s spending ever need match receipts," and:

...Social Security as a (national) liability is an asset to the public, but claims have focused on liabilities without acknowledging the corresponding assets. Since the public debt can be eternal and need never be paid off, a net debt position for Social Security and Medicare can likewise be eternal. We now have two centuries’ experience of accumulated federal budget shortfalls with, predictably, no suggestion of government insolvency.

== See also ==
- Demographic economics
- Dependency ratio
- Distribution (economics)
- Golden Rule savings rate
- Overlapping generations model
- Pensions crisis
- Retirement age, international comparisons
- Wealth § Economic analysis
- Welfare
