= Alan J. Auerbach =

American economist and public policy scholar

- Born: Alan Jeffrey Auerbach; 1951 (age 74–75); New York, USA
- Known for: Destination-Based Cash Flow Tax (DBCFT) generational accounting dynamic fiscal policy
- Honors: Distinguished Fellow, American Economic Association; Daniel M. Holland Medal; Fellow, National Tax Association; Fellow, American Academy of Arts and Sciences; Fellow, Econometric Society; Order of the Rising Sun (Note: Gold Rays with Neck Ribbon)

Academic background
- Education: Yale University (BA); Harvard University (PhD)
- Doctoral advisor: Martin Feldstein

Academic work
- Sub-discipline: public finance, fiscal policy, taxation
- Institutions: University of California, Berkeley; University of Pennsylvania
- Doctoral students: Kevin Hassett; Owen Zidar
- Main interests: macroeconomics public economics law
- Notable works: The Taxation of Capital Income; Handbook of Public Economics; Dynamic Fiscal Policy

Alan Jeffrey Auerbach is an American economist. He is Professor of the Graduate School and Robert D. Burch Professor of Economics and Law, Emeritus, at the University of California, Berkeley. He previously directed the Burch Center for Tax Policy and Public Finance. He has also served on the faculties of Harvard University and the University of Pennsylvania.

Auerbach has served as an adviser to the Bureau of Economic Analysis, Congressional Budget Office, the International Monetary Fund, the Federal Reserve Bank of Chicago, and the U.S. Joint Committee on Taxation. He has served as president of both the National Tax Association and the Western Economic Association International.

== Early life and education ==
Auerbach attended Yale University, where he graduated summa cum laude with a Bachelor of Arts in economics and mathematics in 1974. He was elected to Phi Beta Kappa. He continued his studies at Harvard University, where he earned a Ph.D. in economics in 1978. At Harvard, he received the David A. Wells Prize for his dissertation.

== Career ==
Auerbach joined the faculty of Harvard University as an assistant professor of economics in 1978. In 1982 Auerbach was appointed associate professor at Harvard. During the same period he also served as Visiting Associate Professor of Economics and Irving Fisher Research Fellow at Yale University.

From 1988 to 1990 he served as chair of Penn's Department of Economics. During this period he also accepted a leave of absence to serve as Deputy Chief of Staff of the United States Joint Committee on Taxation in 1992.

Auerbach joined the University of California, Berkeley in 1994 as Robert D. Burch Professor of Economics and Law.

Auerbach also served multiple terms as chair of Berkeley's Department of Economics between 1998 and 2019.

Upon his retirement from full-time teaching in 2025, he was appointed Professor of the Graduate School and Robert D. Burch Professor of Economics and Law, Emeritus.

Auerbach is a Distinguished Fellow of the American Economic Association.

He was awarded the Daniel M. Holland Medal for lifetime contributions to the study and practice of public finance.

Auerbach work also resulted in his 2021 award of the Order of the Rising Sun, bestowed by the government of Japan for his distinguished contribution to the field of economics. In May 2022, he was presented the certificate of decoration by Minister Daishiro Yamagiwa at the Japan Consulate-General in San Francisco, California.

Auerbach, in 2022, receiving the certificate of decoration of the Order of the Rising Sun from Daishiro Yamagiwa, Minister of State for Economic and Fiscal Policy, Japan.

== Research ==
He has worked extensively with fellow economist, Larry Kotlikoff, on a pioneering method for an intergenerational assessment of fiscal policy impacts, known as generational accounting. The economists also collaborated on a measurement technique for the fiscal gap between tax revenues and expenditures in the US federal budget, now widely accepted in both academia and industry.

His most cited work include Measuring the Output Responses to Fiscal Policy.

=== Destination-Based Cash Flow Tax ===
DBCFT is a proposed reform to business taxation that combines features of a cash-flow tax and a destination-based principle. The concept was co-originated by Alan J. Auerbach and Michael Devereux, with contributions by Auerbach dating back to his 1997 article in the American Economic Review, titled The Future of Fundamental Tax Reform.

Advocates of the DBCFT, including Auerbach and colleagues Michael Devereux, Michael Keen, and others, highlight its potential to address challenges such as base erosion, profit shifting, and tax competition. By neutralizing tax distortions between debt and equity financing, the DBCFT can improve corporate investment decisions. Its border-adjustment mechanism reduces incentives for multinational corporations to engage in tax avoidance strategies like transfer pricing, tax inversions, and profit shifting to low-tax jurisdictions.

The concept gained prominence in U.S. tax policy discussions following its inclusion in the Republican Party's 2016 policy paper, A Better Way: Our Vision for a Confident America. This proposal advocated reducing the corporate tax rate from 35% to 20%, offsetting revenue losses with a border-adjustment tax on imports consumed domestically. Auerbach theorized that the border-adjustment tax would lead to a strengthening of the U.S. dollar by about 25%, offsetting potential cost increases for consumers and rendering the tax value-neutral.

The World Trade Organization (WTO) compliance of such a tax has been debated, with some experts, such as Itai Grinberg, proposing ways to structure the tax to align with WTO rules. Additionally, some corporate interests and policymakers have expressed opposition due to fears of increased consumer costs and retaliatory trade measures by other countries.

Auerbach further detailed the benefits and mechanisms of the DBCFT during his testimony before the Tax Subcommittee of the U.S. House of Representatives Committee on Ways and Means in December 2023.

=== Generational accounting ===
In their 1991 paper "Generational Accounts: A Meaningful Alternative to Deficit Accounting", Alan Auerbach, Jagadeesh Gokhale, and Laurence J. Kotlikoff introduced generational accounting as an alternative to traditional deficit accounting for evaluating fiscal policies. They argued that conventional deficit metrics were arbitrary and failed to capture the intergenerational implications of fiscal policy.

Auerbach co-edited Generational Accounting around the World, a seminal work published in 2007 by the University of Chicago Press.

=== Social security ===
From his 1983 paper with coauthors, the Auerbach and colleagues investigated the empirical evidence on the effect of social security on national savings in the US. They find empirical results cannot be predicted with consumption-savings models and therefore confound a strong understanding of the impacts. During President Bush's attempt to privatize parts of social security, Auerbach stated that this could not be done without increased tax revenue to support the system or a decrease in offered benefits. More recently, in 2025, he identified the interacting issues of the rising US deficit, social security funding, and inflation. He identified that inflation will reduce real benefits to social security recipients due to nominal tax rates which lag behind inflation, and the expansion of general revenue to fund social security.

== Fellowships and honors ==
In 2021 he was named a Distinguished Fellow of the American Economic Association. (Note: For his doctoral dissertation.) The same year he received the Order of the Rising Sun, Gold Rays with Neck Ribbon, from the Government of Japan for contributions to economic research and international academic cooperation.

Earlier honors include election as a Fellow of the American Academy of Arts and Sciences in 1999 and as a Fellow of the Econometric Society in 1986. He received the Daniel M. Holland Medal of the National Tax Association in 2011 and was named Distinguished Fellow and inaugural Richard Musgrave Visiting Professor at CESifo in 2009.

Additional recognitions include the Alfred P. Sloan Research Fellowship, the David A. Wells Prize at Harvard University, honorary professorship at Henan University, membership in the National Academy of Social Insurance, and the Best Paper Award of the American Economic Journal: Economic Policy.

== Selected works ==
- The Taxation of Capital Income (1983)
- Dynamic Fiscal Policy (with Laurence J. Kotlikoff, 1987)
- Macroeconomics: An Integrated Approach (with Laurence J. Kotlikoff, 1995; 2nd ed. 1998)
- Generational Accounting Around the World (editor, with Laurence J. Kotlikoff and Willi Leibfritz, 1999)
- Demographic Change and Fiscal Policy (editor, with Ronald Lee, 2001)
- Toward Fundamental Tax Reform (editor, with Kevin Hassett, 2005)
- Taxing Corporate Income in the 21st Century (editor, with James R. Hines Jr. and Joel Slemrod, 2007)
- Institutional Foundations of Public Finance (editor, with Daniel Shaviro, 2009)
- The Economics of Tax Policy (editor, with Kent Smetters, 2017)
- Taxing Profit in a Global Economy (with Michael Devereux, Michael Keen, Paul Oosterhuis, Wolfgang Schön and John Vella, 2021)
