= Thomas Herndon =

American economist

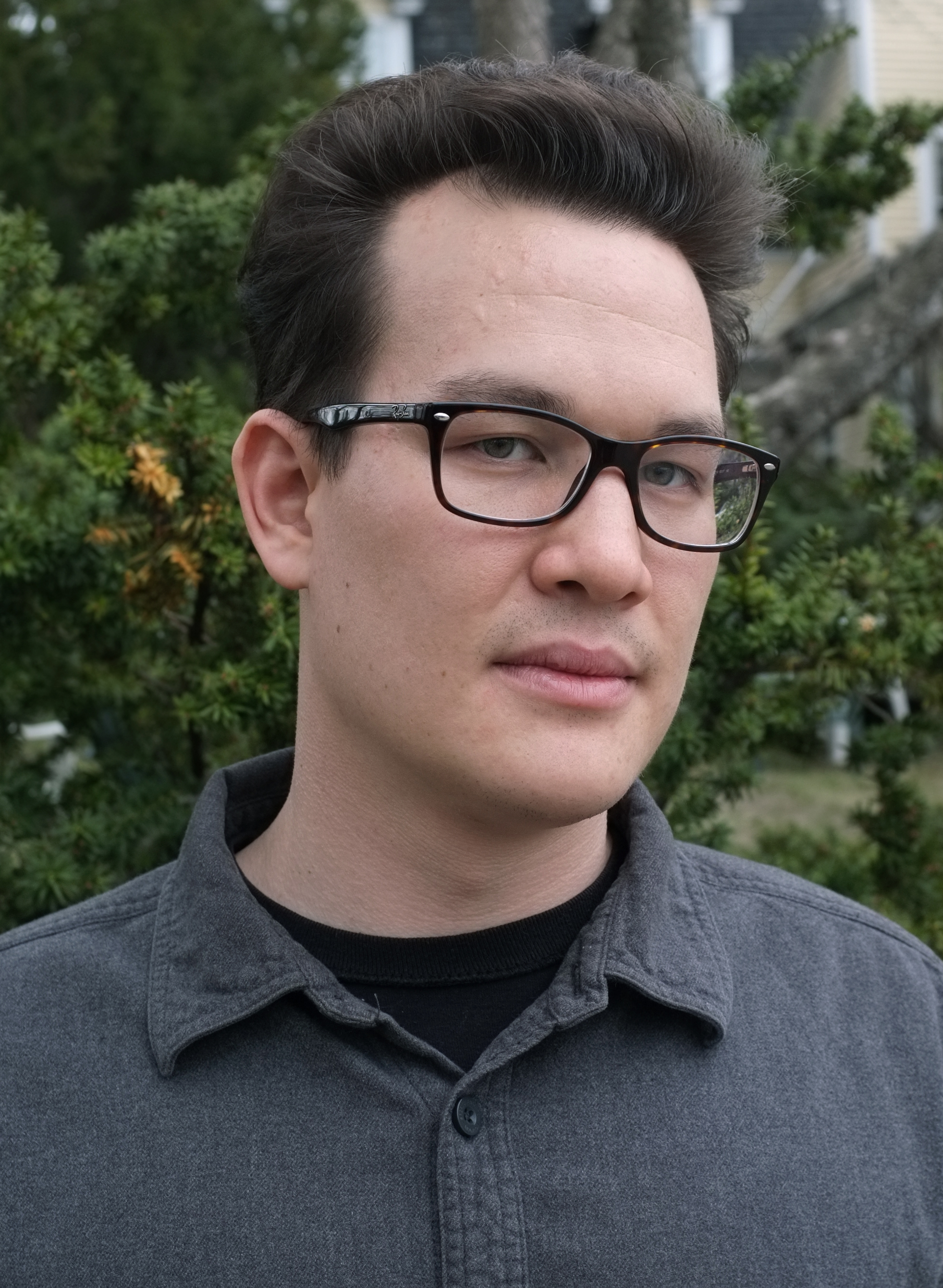
- Born: 25 February, 1985 (age 40)
- Education: Economics
- Alma mater: Evergreen State College; University of Massachusetts Amherst
- Known for: Exposing fundamental errors in "Growth in a Time of Debt"
- Notable work: Academic paper: Does High Public Debt Consistently Stifle Economic Growth? A Critique of Reinhart and Rogoff

Thomas Herndon (born 25 February, 1985) is an associate professor of economics at John Jay College, CUNY in New York City, who has previously worked as assistant professor at Loyola Marymount University in Los Angeles. During his PhD studies at the University of Massachusetts Amherst Herndon became known for critiquing "Growth in a Time of Debt", a widely cited academic paper by Carmen Reinhart and Kenneth Rogoff supporting the austerity policies implemented by governments in Europe and North America in the early 21st century. His research concluded that these measures may not have been necessary.

Herndon proved that the paper contained multiple errors, provoking widespread international interest. The Reinhart–Rogoff paper was frequently cited during the 2012 U.S. presidential election campaign. It was also frequently cited among policymakers in congress, including in the drafting of the Bowles-Simpson report. However, there are differing views on the actual impact the original paper may have had on policy making.

The findings have been described as "shocking" and as having rocked the economics world. Publications such as The Washington Post had for several years taken the conclusions of the Reinhart–Rogoff paper as an "economic consensus view." New York magazine wrote that Herndon "just used part of his spring semester to shake the intellectual foundation of the global austerity movement."

== Discovery of flaws in "Growth in a Time of Debt" ==
During his graduate studies in a class with Professor Michael Ash, Herndon was assigned to pick an economics paper and try to replicate the results. He chose "Growth in a Time of Debt", and throughout the semester his attempts to replicate the results proved unsuccessful. After further consultation with his professors Michael Ash and Robert Pollin, Herndon was encouraged to contact the authors Reinhart and Rogoff at Harvard. They provided him with the actual working spreadsheet they had used to obtain their results. Herndon looked into the detail of the original spreadsheet and found several issues:

- The authors had accidentally only included 15 of the 20 countries under analysis in their key calculation (having excluded Australia, Austria, Belgium, Canada and Denmark);
- For some countries, some data was missing;
- The methodology to average out performance of countries of different sizes was called into question. For example, one bad year for New Zealand, was weighted equally with the United Kingdom, a major global economy with nearly 20 years of high public debt. Reinhart and Rogoff have defended the high weight given to New Zealand's economy in 1951, but even granting this point fully, grave doubts are still placed on the major Reinhart–Rogoff results.

The basic conclusion that countries with indebtedness rates above 90% of GDP have lower growth rates still held, but the most spectacular results disappeared, the relationship was much gentler and there were numerous exceptions to the rule. These results were published on 15 April 2013 as a draft working paper, and in 2014 in the peer-reviewed Cambridge Journal of Economics.
