= Robert Pollin =

American economist

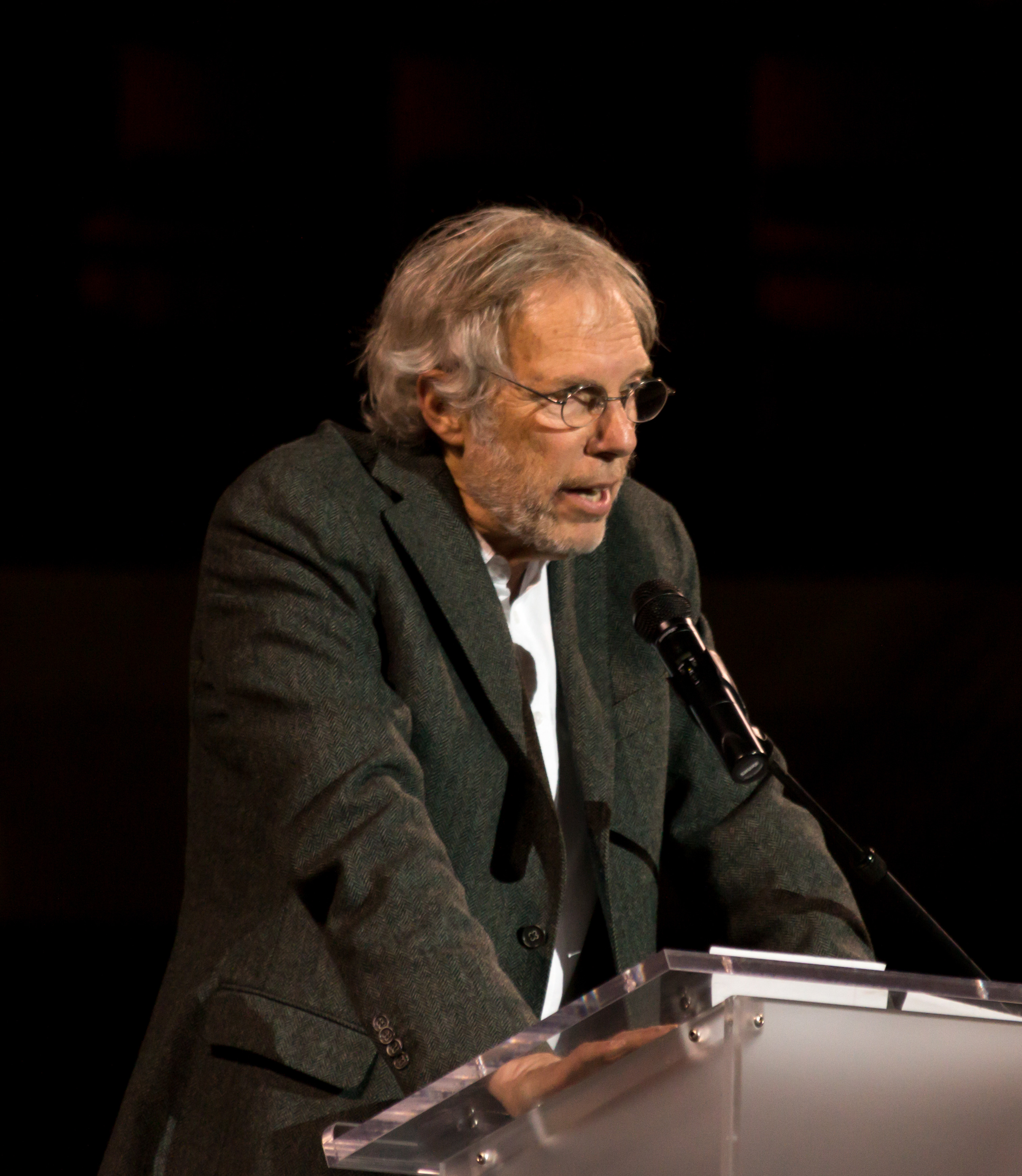
- Pollin in 2017
- Born: Robert Pollin Kercheck; September 29, 1950 (age 76); Washington, D.C., U.S.
- Parent(s): Abe Pollin (father); Irene Pollin (mother)

Academic background
- Education: University of Wisconsin, Madison; New School

Robert Pollin (born September 29, 1950) is an American economist and professor at the University of Massachusetts Amherst, where he is also founding co-director of its Political Economy Research Institute (PERI).

Pollin received his PhD in economics from the New School for Social Research in 1982. He has worked as a consultant for the U.S. Department of Energy, the International Labour Organization, the United Nations Industrial Development Organization and United Nations Development Program. He has also worked as an advisor to US Senator Bernie Sanders.

Pollin has published several books on topics in public economics, such as inequality, financial regulation and public welfare. In 2013, he was selected by Foreign Policy magazine as one of the “100 Leading Global Thinkers.”

== Career ==
He was the economic spokesperson in Jerry Brown's 1992 campaign for President of the United States.

Pollin moved to the University of Massachusetts Amherst's economic department from University of California, Riverside in 1998. According to Marxian economist Richard D. Wolff, Pollin's department is described as being "left Keynesians, but the Keynesianism is the theoretical frame. Marxism, for sure, is not". Pollin states that he would be happy to hire Marxists but that economics departments do not produce them any longer.

In 2013, Pollin, with Thomas Herndon and Michael Ash from the University of Massachusetts Amherst, published a paper which found several errors in Carmen Reinhart's and Kenneth Rogoff's widely cited 2010 paper, "Growth in a Time of Debt".

Pollin and his colleagues defended Nicolas Maduro following the 2013 Venezuelan presidential election stating that audits performed by the Venezuelan government were sufficient and that Maduro won the presidency. In June 2015, the leftist Spanish party Podemos partnered with Pollin on a renewable energy plan that they said would create jobs and make Spain more independent with energy.

In April 2022, Pollin recommended that the US government purchase a controlling interest in the three dominant U.S. oil and gas corporations, ExxonMobil, Chevron, and ConocoPhillips in order to enable the phaseout of fossil fuels and the transition to sustainable energy.

== Personal life ==
Pollin is the son of Jewish parents Irene Pollin and Abe Pollin, the former owners of the NBA's Washington Wizards and Washington Capitals. Pollin was part of the family ownership team that sold the Wizards after his father's death.

== Books ==
- Transforming the US Financial System (ed., with Gary Dymski and Gerald Epstein; 1993)
- The Macroeconomics of Saving, Finance, and Investment (1997)
- Globalization and Progressive Economic Policy (ed., with Dean Baker and Gerald Epstein; 1998)
- The Living Wage: Building a Fair Economy (with Stephanie Luce; 1998)
- Contours of Descent: US Economic Fractures and the Landscape of Global Austerity (2003)
- Back To Full Employment (2012)
- Greening the Global Economy (2015)
- Climate Crisis and the Global Green New Deal (with Noam Chomsky and C. J. Polychroniou; 2020)
