= Vincent Reinhart =

American economist

Vincent R. Reinhart
- Born: August 20, 1957 (age 67); New York City, United States

Academic career
- Institution: American Enterprise Institute, Resident Scholar
- Information at IDEAS / RePEc

Vincent Raymond Reinhart (born August 20, 1957) is the Chief Economist for BNY Mellon Asset Management.

== Early career ==
Reinhart received a B.S. from Fordham University and a M.Phil. and a M.A. from Columbia University. He held several positions in the Federal Reserve Bank of New York in the 1980s, numerous senior positions in the Divisions of Monetary Affairs and International Finance in the 1990s and during the last six years of his career in the Federal Reserve as secretary and economist of the Federal Open Market Committee. From 2011 to 2015, Reinhart was the Chief US Economist at Morgan Stanley. He joined Standish Asset Management, the fixed income boutique for BNY Mellon Investment Management, as Chief Economist in March 2016.

== Research and publication ==
Reinhart's work covers various topics of domestic and international monetary policy, such as economic bubbles, auctions of U.S. Treasury securities, alternative strategies for monetary policy and the efficient communication of monetary policy decisions, and the 2008 financial crisis. He has published in scholarly journals such as the American Economic Review, International Journal of Finance and Economics, Journal of Macroeconomics, Journal of Money, and Credit and Banking, among others. In the financial press, his work is often cited or carried, including in Bloomberg L.P., The New York Times, The Washington Post and The Wall Street Journal.

== Personal information ==
He was born in New York City, United States, and is married to Harvard University economist Carmen Reinhart, who was a classmate in graduate school at Columbia University. They have one child, William Raymond.
