= Government debt =

Total amount of debt owed to lenders by a government/state

Share of government expenditure going to interest payments

A country's gross government debt (also called public debt or sovereign debt) is the financial liabilities of the government sector. Changes in government debt over time reflect primarily borrowing due to past government deficits. A deficit occurs when a government's expenditures exceed revenues. Government debt may be owed to domestic residents, as well as to foreign residents. If owed to foreign residents, that quantity is included in the country's external debt.

In 2020, the value of government debt worldwide was US$87.4 trillion, or 99% measured as a share of gross domestic product (GDP). Government debt accounted for almost 40% of all debt (which includes corporate and household debt), the highest share since the 1960s. The rise in government debt since 2007 is largely attributable to stimulus measures during the Great Recession, and the COVID-19 recession.

Governments may take on debt when the government's spending desires do not match government revenue flows. Taking debt can allow governments to conduct fiscal policy more effectively, avoid tax increases, and making investments with long-term returns. The ability of government to issue debt has been central to state formation and to state building. Public debt has been linked to the rise of democracy, private financial markets, and modern economic growth.

Actors that issue sovereign credit include private investors, commercial banks, multilateral development banks (such as the World Bank) and other governments. Low-income, highly indebted states tend to attain loans from multilateral development banks and other governments because they are considered too risky for private investors. Higher-income states tend to issue sovereign bonds, which are subsequently traded by investors in secondary markets. Ratings agencies (e.g. Moody's, Standard & Poor's) issue ratings that measure the credit-worthiness of governments, which may in turn affect the value of sovereign bonds in secondary markets.

== Measurement ==
Government debt-to-GDP ratio in % (2024, IMF): >100% >75–100% >50–75% / >25–50% 0–25% no data

Government debt is typically measured as the gross debt of the general government sector that is in the form of liabilities that are debt instruments. A debt instrument is a financial claim that requires payment of interest and/or principal by the debtor to the creditor in the future. Examples include debt securities (such as bonds and bills), loans, and government employee pension obligations.

International comparisons usually focus on general government debt because the level of government responsible for programs (for example, health care) differs across countries and the general government comprises central, state, provincial, regional, local governments, and social security funds. The debt of public corporations (such as post offices that provide goods or services on a market basis) is not included in general government debt, following the International Monetary Fund's Government Finance Statistics Manual 2014 (GFSM), which describes recommended methodologies for compiling debt statistics to ensure international comparability.

The gross debt of the general government sector is the total liabilities that are debt instruments. An alternative debt measure is net debt, which is gross debt minus financial assets in the form of debt instruments. Net debt estimates are not always available since some government assets may be difficult to value, such as loans made at concessional rates.

Debt can be measured at market value or nominal value. As a general rule, the GFSM says debt should be valued at market value, the value at which the asset could be exchanged for cash. However, the nominal value is useful for a debt-issuing government, as it is the amount that the debtor owes to the creditor. If market and nominal values are not available, face value (the undiscounted amount of principal to be repaid at maturity) is used.

A country's general government debt-to-GDP ratio is an indicator of its debt burden since GDP measures the value of goods and services produced by an economy during a period (usually a year). As well, debt measured as a percentage of GDP facilitates comparisons across countries of different size. The OECD views the general government debt-to-GDP ratio as a key indicator of the fiscal sustainability of a government. The government debt growth was found unsustainable for many countries.

=== Off-balance-sheet liabilities ===
Most governments have liabilities off-balance-sheet, including unfunded mandates and contingent liabilities.

Unfunded mandates include pay-as-you-go pension obligations. According to the 2018 annual reports from the trustees for the U.S. Social Security and Medicare trust funds, Medicare is facing a $37 trillion unfunded liability over the next 75 years, and Social Security is facing a $13 trillion unfunded liability over the same time frame. Neither of these amounts are included in the U.S. gross general government debt, which in 2024 was $34 trillion.

Examples of contingent liabilities include covering the obligations of subnational governments in the event of a default, and spending for natural disaster relief.

Unfunded mandates and contingent liabilities should be included in the government's balance sheet, if they are contractual obligations. In 2010 the European Commission required EU Member Countries to publish their debt information in standardized methodology, explicitly including liabilities that were previously hidden in a number of ways to satisfy minimum requirements on local (national) and European (Stability and Growth Pact) level.

== Causes of government debt accumulation ==
An important reason governments borrow is to act as an economic "shock absorber". For example, deficit financing can be used to maintain government services during a recession when tax revenues fall and expenses rise for say unemployment benefits. Government debt created to cover costs from major shock events can be particularly beneficial. Such events would include

- a major war, like World War II;
- a public health emergency like the COVID-19 recession; or
- a severe economic downturn as with the Great Recession.

In the absence of debt financing, when revenues decline during a downturn, a government would need to raise taxes or reduce spending, which would exacerbate the negative event.

While government borrowing may be desirable at times, a "deficits bias" can arise when there is disagreement among groups in society over government spending. Increasing government debt can be described as a tragedy of the commons, where individual politicians are incentivised to increase their popularity with deficit spending, but if politicians follow this incentive then the public debt-to-GDP ratio grows until sovereign default. To counter deficit bias, many countries have adopted balanced budget rules or restrictions on government debt. Examples include the "debt anchor" in Sweden; a "debt brake" in Germany and Switzerland; and the European Union's Stability and Growth Pact agreement to maintain a general government gross debt of no more than 60% of GDP.

== History ==
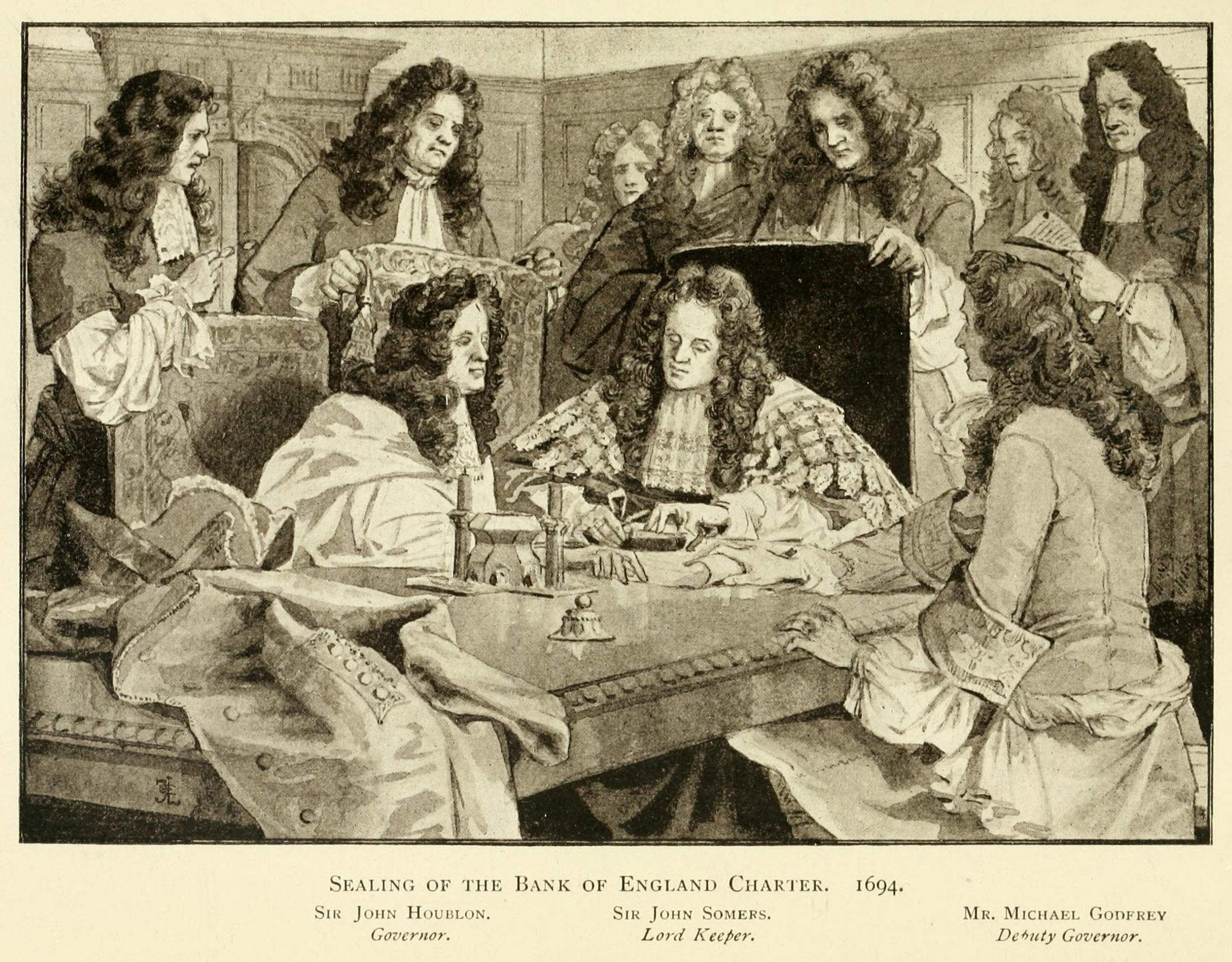
The sealing of the Bank of England Charter (1694)

The ability of government to issue debt has been central to state formation and to state building. Public debt has been linked to the rise of democracy, private financial markets, and modern economic growth. For example, in the 17th and 18th centuries England established a parliament that included creditors, as part of a larger coalition, whose authorization had to be secured for the country to borrow or raise taxes. This institution improved England's ability to borrow because lenders were more willing to hold the debt of a state with democratic institutions that would support debt repayment, versus a state where the monarch could not be compelled to repay debt.

As public debt came to be recognized as a safe and liquid investment, it could be used as collateral for private loans. This created a complementarity between the development of public debt markets and private financial markets. Government borrowing to finance public goods, such as urban infrastructure, has been associated with modern economic growth.

Written records point to public borrowing as long as two thousand years ago when Greek city-states such as Syracuse borrowed from their citizens. But the founding of the Bank of England in 1694 revolutionised public finance and put an end to defaults such as the Great Stop of the Exchequer of 1672, when Charles II had suspended payments on his bills. From then on, the British Government would never fail to repay its creditors. In the following centuries, other countries in Europe and later around the world adopted similar financial institutions to manage their government debt.

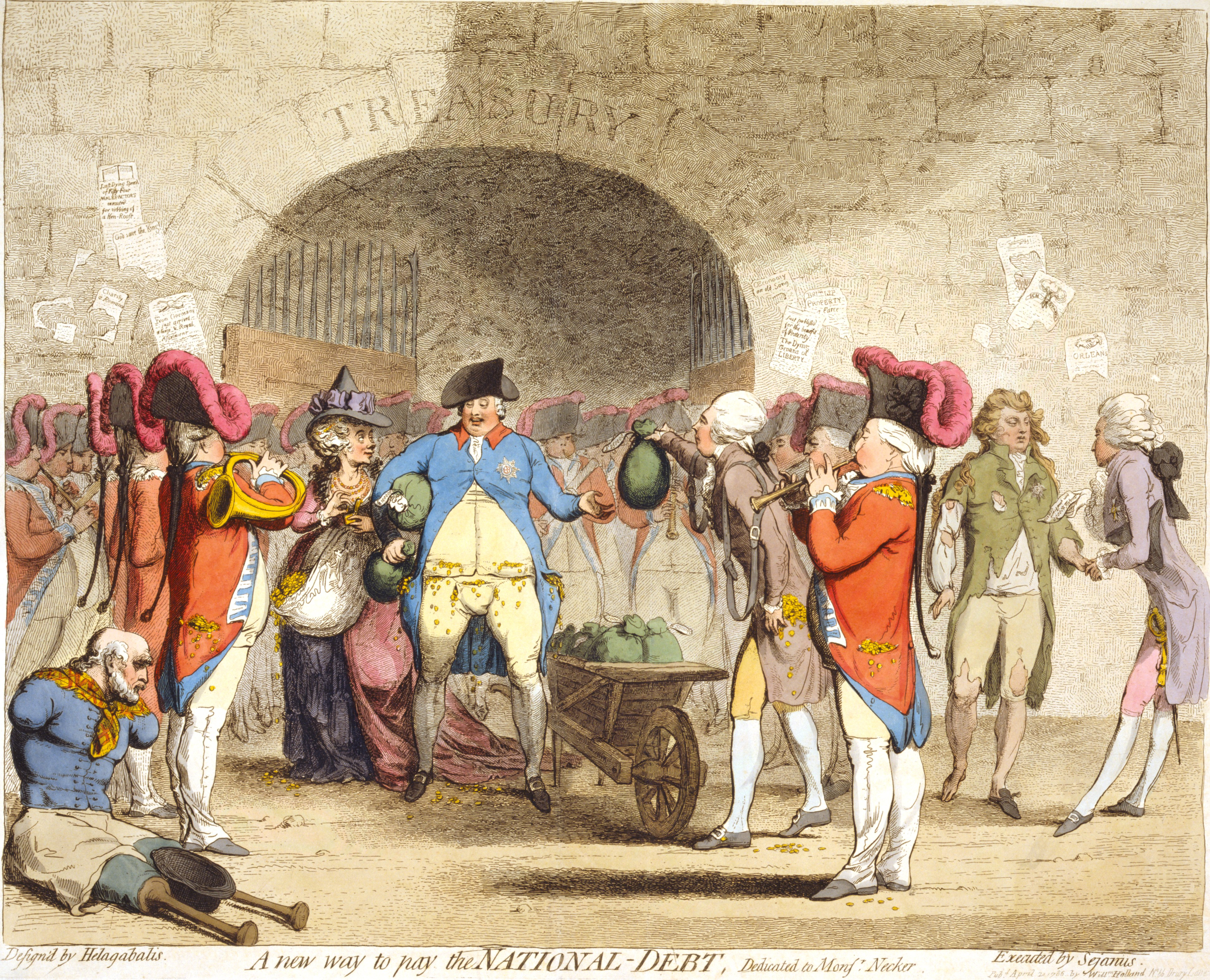
A new way to pay the National Debt, James Gillray, 1786. King George III, with William Pitt handing him another moneybag.

In 1815, at the end of the Napoleonic Wars, British government debt reached a peak of more than 200% of GDP, nearly 887 million pounds sterling. The debt was paid off over 90 years by running primary budget surpluses (that is, revenues were greater than spending after payment of interest).

In 1900, the country with the most total debt was France (£1,086,215,525), followed by Russia (£656,000,000) then the United Kingdom (£628,978,782); on a per-capita basis, the highest-debt countries were New Zealand (£58 12s. per person), the Australian colonies (£52 13s.) and Portugal (£35).

In 2018, global government debt reached the equivalent of $66 trillion, or about 80% of global GDP, and by 2020, global government debt reached $87US trillion, or 99% of global GDP. The COVID-19 pandemic caused public debt to soar in 2020, particularly in advanced economies that put in place sweeping fiscal measures.

== Impacts of government debt ==
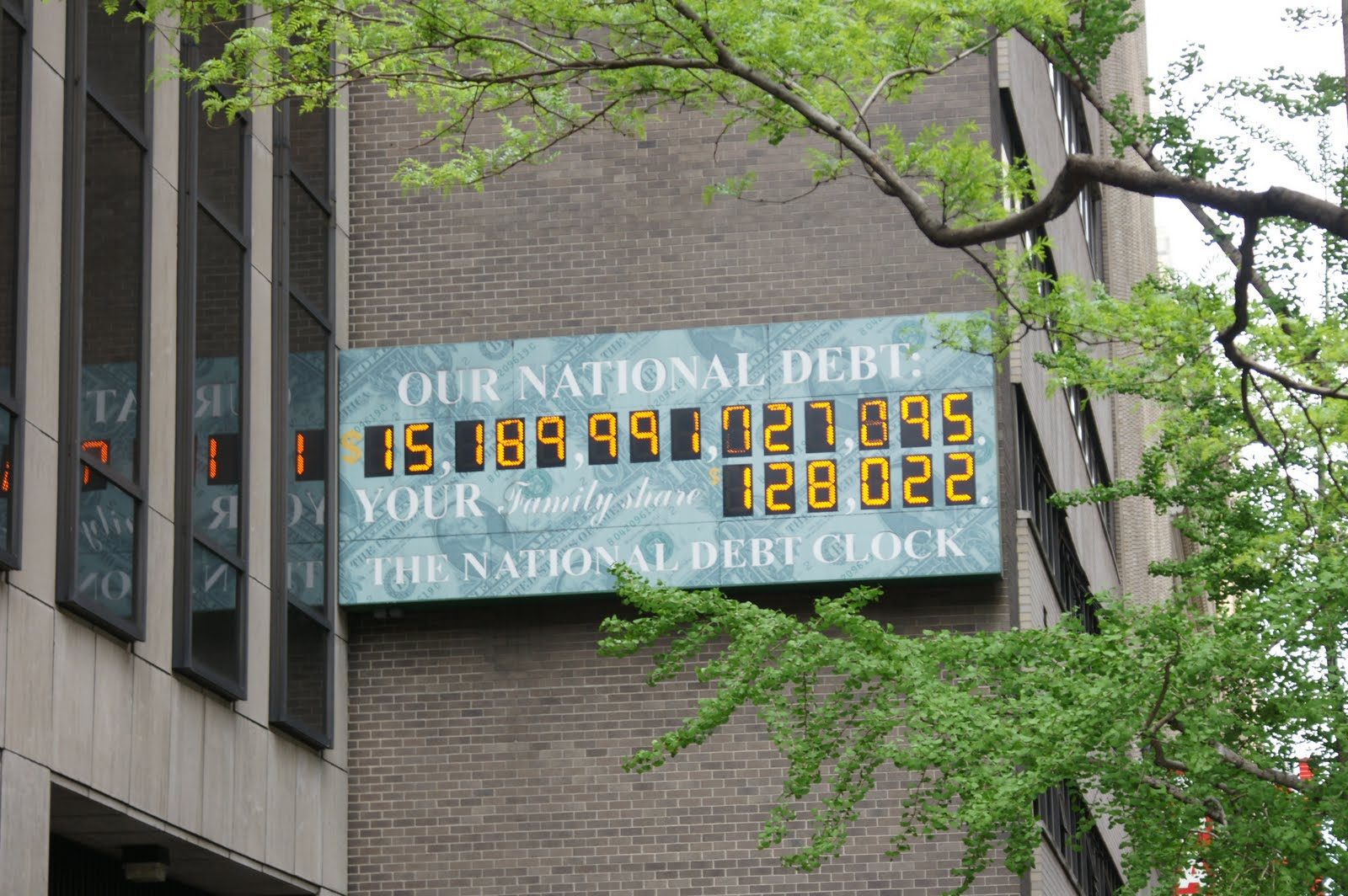
National Debt Clock outside the IRS office in NYC, April 20, 2012

Government debt accumulation may lead to a rising interest rate, which can crowd out private investment as governments compete with private firms for limited investment funds. Some evidence suggests growth rates are lower for countries with government debt greater than around 80 percent of GDP. A World Bank Group report that analyzed debt levels of 100 developed and developing countries from 1980 to 2008 found that debt-to-GDP ratios above 77% for developed countries (64% for developing countries) reduced future annual economic growth by 0.017 (0.02 for developing countries) percentage points for each percentage point of debt above the threshold.

Excessive debt levels may make governments more vulnerable to a debt crisis, where a country is unable to make payments on its debt, and it cannot borrow more. Crises can be costly, particularly if a debt crisis is combined with a financial/banking crisis which leads to economy-wide deleveraging. As firms sell assets to pay off debt, asset prices fall which risks an even greater fall in incomes, further depressing tax revenue and requiring governments to drastically cut government services. Examples of debt crises include the Latin American debt crisis of the early 1980s, and Argentina's debt crisis in 2001. To help avoid a crisis, governments may want to maintain a "fiscal breathing space". Historical experience shows that room to double the level of government debt when needed is an approximate guide.

According to the Ricardian equivalence proposition, while the quantity of government purchases affects the economy, debt financing will have the same impact as tax financing because with debt financing individuals will anticipate the future taxes needed to repay the debt, and so increase their saving and bequests by the amount of government debt. Such higher individual saving means, for example, that private consumption falls one-for-one with the rise in government debt, so the interest rate would not rise and private investment is not crowded out.

Government debt imposes a negative inheritance on future generations and reduces intergenerational equity, because the beneficiaries of the government's expenditure on goods and services when the debt is created typically differ from the individuals responsible for repaying the debt in the future.

In public discourse, politicians and commentators frequently draw parallels between government debt and household debt, as they argue that a government taking on debt is akin to a household taking on debt. However, economists generally challenge this analogy, as the functions and constraints of governments and households are vastly dissimilar. Differences include that central banks can print money, interest rates on government borrowing may be cheaper than individual borrowing, governments can increase their budgets through taxation, governments have indefinite planning horizons, national debt may be held primarily domestically (the equivalent of household members owing each other), governments typically have greater collateral for borrowing, and contractions in government spending can cause or prolong economic crises and increase the debt of the government. For governments, the main risks of overspending may revolve around inflation rather than the size of the debt per se.

== Risk ==
=== Credit (Default) risk ===
Historically, there have been many cases where governments have defaulted on their debts, including Spain in the 16th and 17th centuries, which nullified its government debt several times; the Confederate States of America, whose debt was not repaid after the American Civil War; and revolutionary Russia after 1917, which refused to accept responsibility for Imperial Russia's foreign debt.

If government debt is issued in a country's own fiat money, it is sometimes considered risk free because the debt and interest can be repaid by money creation. However, not all governments issue their own currency. Examples include sub-national governments, like municipal, provincial, and state governments; and countries in the eurozone. In the Greek government-debt crisis, one proposed solution was for Greece to leave the eurozone and go back to issuing the drachma (although this would have addressed only future debt issuance, leaving substantial existing debt denominated in what would then be a foreign currency).

Debt of a sub-national government is generally viewed as less risky for a lender if it is explicitly or implicitly guaranteed by a regional or national level of government. When New York City declined into what would have been bankrupt status during the 1970s, a bailout came from New York State and the United States national government. U.S. state and local government debt is substantial — in 2016 their debt amounted to $3 trillion, plus another $5 trillion in unfunded liabilities.

=== Inflation risk ===
A country that issues its own currency may be at low risk of default in local currency, but if a central bank without inflation targeting provides finance by buying government bonds (debt monetization or indirectly quantitative easing), this can lead to price inflation. In an extreme case, in the 1920s Weimar Germany suffered from hyperinflation when the government used money creation to pay off the national debt following World War I.

=== Exchange rate risk ===
While U.S. Treasury bonds denominated in U.S. dollars may be considered risk-free to an American purchaser, a foreign investor bears the risk of a fall in the value of the U.S. dollar relative to their home currency. A government can issue debt in foreign currency to eliminate exchange rate risk for foreign lenders, but that means the borrowing government then bears the exchange rate risk. Also, by issuing debt in foreign currency, a country cannot erode the value of the debt by means of inflation. Almost 70% of all debt in a sample of developing countries from 1979 through 2006 was denominated in U.S. dollars.

== See also ==
- Credit default swap
- Crowding-in effect
- Crowding out
- Debt clock
- Debt Sustainability Analysis
- Financial repression
- Fiscal dominance
- Fiscal gap
- Generational accounting
- Global debt
- Government budget balance
- Municipal bond
- Public finance
- Warrant of payment

By country:

- 1980s austerity policy in Romania
- Latin American debt crisis
- Euro area crisis
- National debt of the United States

Lists:

- List of countries by credit rating
- List of countries by external debt
- List of countries by net international investment position
- List of countries by government debt
- List of sovereign debt crises
