= Growth in a Time of Debt =

2010 economics paper by Carmen Reinhart and Kenneth Rogoff

"Growth in a Time of Debt", also known by its authors' names as Reinhart–Rogoff, is an economics paper by American economists Carmen Reinhart and Kenneth Rogoff published in a non peer-reviewed issue of the American Economic Review in 2010. Politicians, commentators, and activists widely cited the paper in political debates over the effectiveness of austerity in fiscal policy for debt-burdened economies. The paper argues that when "gross external debt reaches 60 percent of GDP", a country's annual growth declined by two percent, and "for levels of external debt in excess of 90 percent" GDP growth was "roughly cut in half." Appearing in the aftermath of the 2008 financial crisis, the evidence for the 90%-debt threshold hypothesis provided support for pro-austerity policies.

In 2013, academic critics accused Reinhart and Rogoff of employing methodology that suffered from 3 major errors; they asserted that the underlying data did not support the authors' conclusions. These critics held that the Reinhart–Rogoff paper had led to unjustified adoption of austerity policies for countries with various levels of public debt.

Further papers by Rogoff and Reinhart, and the International Monetary Fund, which were not found to contain similar errors, found much lower impact on GDP growth. The threshold hypothesis retains adherents as well as critics, who suggest that the thresholds in the relation between public debt and economic growth lack robustness, so a consensus on the 90%-threshold hypothesis in the relation between public debt and economic growth has been elusive. A 2022 meta-analysis was unable to reject the null hypothesis after controlling for publication bias.

== Political influence ==
In their critique of Reinhart and Rogoff's paper, University of Massachusetts Amherst economists Thomas Herndon, Michael Ash, and Robert Pollin pointed out that "Growth in a Time of Debt" was influential on the United States Republican Party's budget proposal "The Path to Prosperity" (commonly referred to as the "Paul Ryan budget"):

RR 2010a [Growth in a Time of Debt] is the only evidence cited in the "Paul Ryan Budget" on the consequences of high public debt for economic growth. Representative Ryan's "Path to Prosperity" reports (Ryan 2013 p. 78):

A well-known study completed by economists Ken Rogoff and Carmen Reinhart confirms this common-sense conclusion. The study found conclusive empirical evidence that gross debt (meaning all debt that a government owes, including debt held in government trust funds) exceeding 90 percent of the economy has a significant negative effect on economic growth.

RR have clearly exerted a major influence in recent years on public policy debates over the management of government debt and fiscal policy more broadly. Their findings have provided significant support for the austerity agenda that has been ascendant in Europe and the United States since 2010.

Olli Rehn, EU Commissioner for Economic Affairs, in his address to the International Labour Organization on April 9, 2013, used the Reinhart–Rogoff paper to argue that "public debt in Europe is expected to stabilise only by 2014 and to do so at above 90% of GDP. Serious empirical research has shown that at such high levels, public debt acts as a permanent drag on growth."

British Member of Parliament George Osborne (who became Chancellor of the Exchequer in 2010) relied on the paper to portray excess debt as the universal cause of financial crises: "As Rogoff and Reinhart demonstrate convincingly, all financial crises ultimately have their origins in one thing."

== Methodological criticism ==
The paper was published in an annual "Papers and Proceedings" edition of The American Economic Review that was not subject to the same peer-review standards that other editions use before publication. Reinhart and Rogoff (RR) did not publish the data sample upon which they based their conclusions, but they made it available upon request to Thomas Herndon, Michael Ash and Robert Pollin (HAP), who then closely examined the data used in the study.

In April 2013, HAP released a critique of the RR data analysis in the working paper "Does High Public Debt Consistently Stifle Economic Growth? A Critique of Reinhart and Rogoff", later published in the Cambridge Journal of Economics. They contend that the statistical analyses performed on the data in the original RR Excel spreadsheet (which were used to support the conclusions of the paper) were flawed: "While using RR's working spreadsheet, we identified coding errors, selective exclusion of available data, and unconventional weighting of summary statistics." Using RR's working spreadsheet, but correcting for the claimed errors, HAP found:

When properly calculated, the average real GDP growth rate for countries carrying a public-debt-to-GDP ratio of over 90 percent is actually 2.2 percent, not −0.1 percent as published in Reinhart and Rogoff. That is, contrary to RR, average GDP growth at public debt/GDP ratios over 90 percent is not dramatically different than when debt/GDP ratios are lower.

HAP also argued that the sample was biased, claiming that RR selectively omitted data for Australia, Canada, and New Zealand for the early post-World War II period, which showed high growth despite large public debts, while including data for the United States for the same period that showed negative GDP growth, which Herndon attributed to demobilization of U.S. military personnel. Also, by using only one year's data for New Zealand, a negative 7.6% GDP growth in 1951, a year in which New Zealand's trade suffered from a major strike, the average central tendency of the available 5 years (1946–1949 and 1951) shifted from 2.6% to −7.6%.

HAP concluded that the "combination of the collapse of the empirical result that high public debt is inevitably associated with greatly reduced GDP growth and the weakness of the theoretical mechanism under current conditions... render the Reinhart and Rogoff point close to irrelevant for current public policy debate."

RR published a lengthy, detailed response to HAP in The New York Times:

Herndon, Ash and Pollin accurately point out the coding error that omits several countries from the averages in figure 2. Full stop. HAP are on point.... HAP go on to note some other missing debt data points [New Zealand], which they describe as "selective omissions." This charge, which permeates through their paper, is one we object to in the strongest terms.... Data for New Zealand for the years around WWII had just been incorporated and we had not vetted the comparability and quality data with data for the more recent period.... They argue that we use an "unconventional weighting of summary statistics." In particular, for each bucket, we take average growth rates for each country and then take an average of the result. This seems perfectly natural to us, and hardly unconventional.

Economics professor L. Randall Wray criticized Reinhart and Rogoff for combining data "across centuries, exchange rate regimes, public and private debt, and debt denominated in foreign currency as well as domestic currency," in addition to "statistical errors," and for lacking a "theory of sovereign currency".

Other critiques point out that any correspondence between debt levels and insufficient economic growth could just as easily be reversed: it is the weak economic growth that leads to the high debt levels. Others have argued that the relationship between debt and growth varies significantly between countries, meaning that an average "rule", such as that suggested by Reinhart and Rogoff, has little meaning or policy relevance.

Economist and New York Times columnist Paul Krugman wrote in 2013:

What the Reinhart-Rogoff affair shows is the extent to which austerity has been sold on false pretenses. For three years, the turn to austerity has been presented not as a choice but as a necessity. Economic research, austerity advocates insisted, showed that terrible things happen once debt exceeds 90 percent of G.D.P. But "economic research" showed no such thing; a couple of economists made that assertion, while many others disagreed. Policy makers abandoned the unemployed and turned to austerity because they wanted to, not because they had to.

== See also ==
- Expansionary fiscal contraction
