= Public finance =

Study of the role of government within the economy

Public finance refers to the monetary resources available to governments and also to the study of finance within government and role of the government in the economy. Within academic settings, public finance is a widely studied subject in many branches of political science, political economy and public economics. Research assesses the government revenue and government expenditure of the public authorities and the adjustment of one or the other to achieve desirable effects and avoid undesirable ones. The purview of public finance is considered to be threefold, consisting of governmental effects on:

1. The efficient allocation of available resources;
2. The distribution of income among citizens; and
3. The stability of the economy.

American public policy advisor and economist Jonathan Gruber put forth a framework to assess the broad field of public finance in 2010:

1. When should the government intervene in the economy? To which there are two central motivations for government intervention, market failure and redistribution of income and wealth.
2. How might the government intervene? Once the decision is made to intervene the government must choose the specific tool or policy choice to carry out the intervention (for example public provision, taxation, or subsidization).
3. What is the effect of those interventions on economic outcomes? A question to assess the empirical direct and indirect effects of specific government intervention.
4. And finally, why do governments choose to intervene in the way that they do? This question is centrally concerned with the study of political economy, theorizing how governments make public policy.

== Overview ==
One of the more traditional subfields of economics, public finance emphasizes the function and role of government in the economy. A region's inhabitants established a formal or informal entity known as the government to carry out a variety of tasks, including providing for social requirements like education and healthcare as well as protecting the populace's private property from outside threats.

The proper role of government provides a starting point for the analysis of public finance. In theory, under certain circumstances, private markets will allocate goods and services among individuals efficiently (in the sense that no waste occurs and that individual tastes are matching with the economy's productive abilities). If private markets were able to provide efficient outcomes and if the distribution of income were socially acceptable, then there would be little or no scope for government. In many cases, however, conditions for private market efficiency are violated. For example, if many people can enjoy the same good (the moment that good was produced and sold, it starts to give its utility to every one for free) at the same time (non-rival, non-excludable consumption), then private markets may supply too little of that good. National defense is one example of non-rival consumption, or of a public good.

"Market failure" occurs when private markets do not allocate goods or services efficiently. The existence of market failure provides an efficiency-based rationale for collective or governmental provision of goods and services. Externalities, public goods, informational advantages, strong economies of scale, and network effects can cause market failures. Public provision via a government or a voluntary association, however, is subject to other inefficiencies, termed "government failure."

Under broad assumptions, government decisions about the efficient scope and level of activities can be efficiently separated from decisions about the design of taxation systems (Diamond-Mirrlees separation). In this view, public sector programs should be designed to maximize social benefits minus costs (cost-benefit analysis), and then revenues needed to pay for those expenditures should be raised through a taxation system that creates the fewest efficiency losses caused by distortion of economic activity as possible. In practice, government budgeting or public budgeting is substantially more complicated and often results in inefficient practices.

Government can pay for spending by borrowing (for example, with government bonds), although borrowing is a method of distributing tax burdens through time rather than a replacement for taxes. A deficit is the difference between government spending and revenues. The accumulation of deficits over time is the total public debt. Deficit finance allows governments to smooth tax burdens over time and gives governments an important fiscal policy tool. Deficits can also narrow the options of successor governments. There is also a difference between public and private finance, in public finance the source of income is indirect, e.g., various taxes (specific taxes, value added taxes), but in private finance sources of income is direct.

== History ==
Although public finance only began to be viewed as a body of knowledge no more than a century and a half ago, there is evidence of principles common to public finance as early as the bible with discussions of Sunday-trade, slavery regulations, and compassion for the poor. Public finance, although not explicitly named, is often the subject of much of political philosophy.

These concepts can be seen in Ancient Greece as well, although it was split into two categories there: on one hand the government was to provide for a theater in every city and works of art in the country side. On the other hand, the government was to provide financing for war. Unemployment in ancient Greece was virtually non-existent as Greek economic rule equated heavily to slavery. Greek economic development as per the governmental duties extended to growth, equity, and employment.

The Romans later popularized systemic bodies of law. They guaranteed freedom of contract and property, as well as reasonable price and value. They also developed a well-maintained system of roads and colonies which led to one of the first real tax systems. Their system was based on two types of taxes: tributa and vectigalia. The former included the land tax and a poll tax, while the latter was made up of another poll tax, an inheritance tax, a sales tax, and a postage tax. Other taxes depended entirely on the city and were usually temporary. These taxes were used among other things to fund the military, establish trade routes, and fund the cursus publicum. Each region had a set amount to pay which would be collected by aristocrats. Who paid taxes was determined by local officials. The Romans employed a regressive tax system wherein the lower income levels paid higher taxes and the wealthier enjoyed reduced taxation.

During feudalism lacking communication led to issues with pre-existing tax systems. Taxation was organized based on what "men spend" in hopes of encouraging investment and savings. Since the government was meant to take care of those who would otherwise turn to charity or crime by means of an allowance provided by a public tax, it is one of the first concepts of what could be considered a negative income tax. Additionally, in England at the time, the main taxes paid were land taxes, a tax that was collected in order to pay for mercenaries. The first mention of a tax in Anglo-Saxon England dates back to the 7th century where it's specified that fines resulting from judicial cases should be paid to the king. Later something known as food rent was introduced, wherein regions would pay a certain amount of their foodstuffs to the king periodically.

This food rent was not too dissimilar from the taxes imposed on serfs in Russia in the Middle Ages wherein they were to pay most of their produce and goods to the local lord. In 1550 serfs were instructed to pay another tax called za povoz, which was imposed on those who refused to deliver the harvest from their fields to their master. Later in the eighteenth and nineteenth century lords began having to pay a per capita tax for each of their peasants and were responsible for their well-being during times of famine.

Toward this time, public finance and interest in how governments were to utilize the money earned from taxes as well as how to provide for their state became increasingly common.

The laissez-faire approach first became popular toward the middle of the 17th century, popularized especially by Charles Davenant. The laissez-faire attitude was especially common with Physiocrats in France (as opposed to the classical school in Britain). They maintained a "laissez-faire, laisser-passer" attitude, with one of the central ideas being that the government's central role should be to guarantee private property, and the maintenance of one single tax, namely the produit net, which encompassed the farmer's surplus.

Adam Smith also advocated for the laissez-faire attitude, but also claimed that the government would need to take a more proactive role in protection, justice, and public works. He first proposed the idea of a public good, as he believed that a good could provide a value to society as a whole that would exceed the value it would provide to only one individual. Adam Smith also maintained that a government should maintain a properly regulated money flow and banking system, patents as well as copyrights, and provide public education and transport. For him public projects always needed to yield a profit that would be greater to society than the individual. One of the most pivotal works on taxation, Adam Smith's Canons of Taxation gave further criteria for taxation, namely equality, certainty, convenience, and economy.

Following Adam Smith, several economists expanded on his ideas, or transformed them as in the case of Thomas Robert Malthus, who believed that tax-financed public works would be most effective, so long as it created greater demand for labor and commodities.

Public finance as a field began becoming more well-known and independently recognized around this time, with John Ramsay McCulloch writing many pivotal works in the field.

== Public finance management ==
Collection of sufficient resources from the economy in an appropriate manner along with allocating and use of these resources efficiently and effectively constitute good financial management. Resource generation, resource allocation, and expenditure management (resource utilization) are the essential components of a public financial management system.

The following subdivisions form the subject matter of public finance.

1. Public expenditure
2. Public revenue
3. Public debt
4. Financial administration
5. National finance
6. Fiscal policy

== Government expenditures ==
Economists classify government expenditures into three main types. Government purchases of goods and services for current use are classed as government consumption. Government purchases of goods and services intended to create future benefits – such as infrastructure investment or research spending – are classed as government investment. Government expenditures that are not purchases of goods and services, and instead just represent transfers of money – such as social security payments – are called transfer payments.

=== Government operations ===
Government operations are those activities involved in the running of a state or a functional equivalent of a state (for example, tribes, secessionist movements or revolutionary movements) for the purpose of producing value for the citizens. Government operations have the power to make, and the authority to enforce rules and laws within a civil, corporate, religious, academic, or other organization or group.

=== Income distribution ===
- Income distribution – Some forms of government expenditure are specifically intended to transfer income from some groups to others. For example, governments sometimes transfer income to people that have suffered a loss due to natural disaster. Likewise, public pension programs transfer wealth from the young to the old. Other forms of government expenditure that represent purchases of goods and services also have the effect of changing the income distribution. For example, engaging in a war may transfer wealth to certain sectors of society. Public education transfers wealth to families with children in these schools. Public road construction transfers wealth from people that do not use the roads to those people that do (and to those that build the roads).
- Income Security
- Employment insurance
- Health Care
- Public financing of campaigns

== Financing of government expenditures ==
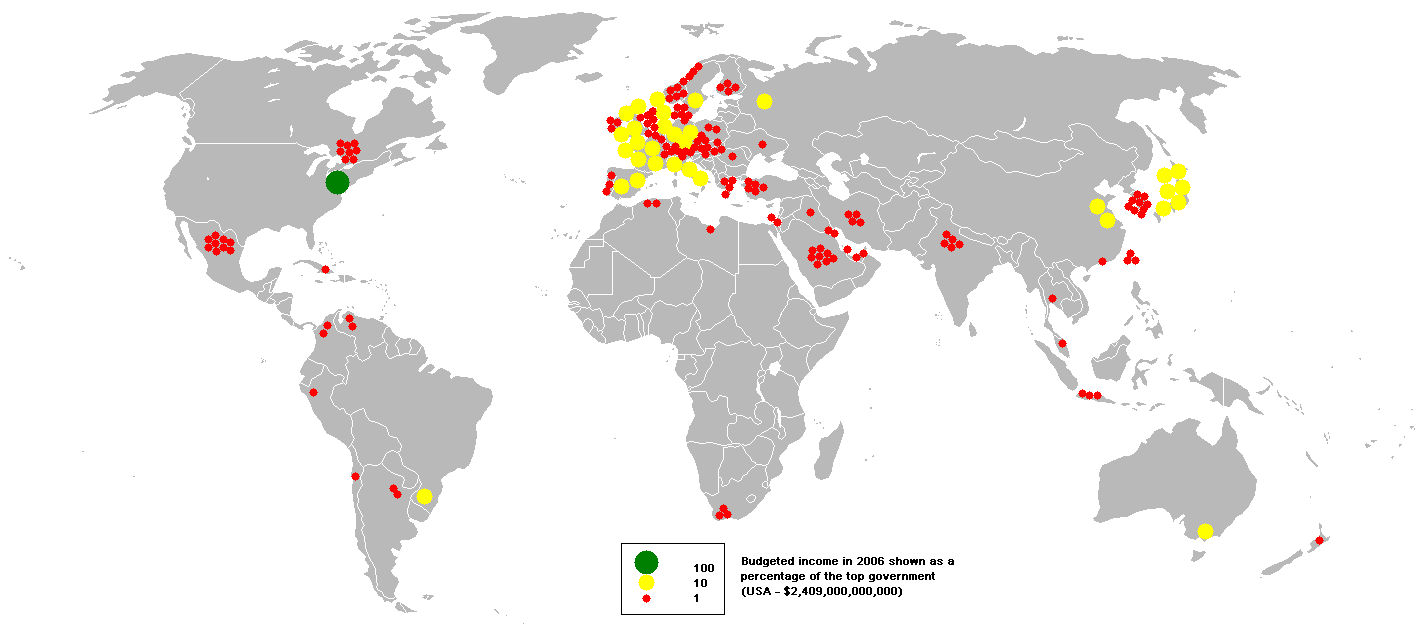
Budgeted revenues of governments in 2006.

Government expenditures are financed primarily in three ways:

- Government revenue
  - Taxes
  - Non-tax revenue (revenue from government-owned corporations, sovereign wealth funds, sales of assets, or seigniorage)
- Government borrowing
- Money creation

How a government chooses to finance its activities can have important effects on the distribution of income and wealth (income redistribution) and on the efficiency of markets (effect of taxes on market prices and efficiency). The issue of how taxes affect income distribution is closely related to tax incidence, which examines the distribution of tax burdens after market adjustments are taken into account. Public finance research also analyzes effects of the various types of taxes and types of borrowing as well as administrative concerns, such as tax enforcement.

=== Taxes ===
Taxation is the central part of modern public finance. Its significance arises not only from the fact that it is by far the most important of all revenues but also because of the gravity of the problems created by the present day tax burden. The main objective of taxation is raising revenue. A high level of taxation is necessary in a welfare State to fulfill its obligations. Taxation is used as an instrument of attaining certain social objectives, i.e., as a means of redistribution of wealth and thereby reducing inequalities. Taxation in a modern government is thus needed not merely to raise the revenue required to meet its expenditure on administration and social services, but also to reduce the inequalities of income and wealth. Taxation might also be needed to draw away money that would otherwise go into consumption and cause inflation to rise.

A tax is a financial charge or other levy imposed on an individual or a legal entity by a state or a functional equivalent of a state (for example, tribes, secessionist movements or revolutionary movements). Taxes could also be imposed by a subnational entity. Taxes consist of direct tax or indirect tax, and may be paid in money or as corvée labor. A tax may be defined as a "pecuniary burden laid upon individuals or property to support the government [ . . .] a payment exacted by legislative authority." A tax "is not a voluntary payment or donation, but an enforced contribution, exacted pursuant to legislative authority" and is "any contribution imposed by government [ . . .] whether under the name of toll, tribute, tallage, gabel, impost, duty, custom, excise, subsidy, aid, supply, or other name."

- There are various types of taxes, broadly divided into two heads – direct (which is proportional) and indirect tax (which is differential in nature):
- Stamp duty, levied on documents
- Excise tax (tax levied on production for sale, or sale, of a certain good)
- Sales tax (tax on business transactions, especially the sale of goods and services)
  - Value added tax (VAT) is a type of sales tax
  - Services taxes on specific services
- Road tax; Vehicle excise duty (UK), Registration Fee (US), Regco (Australia), Vehicle Licensing Fee (Brazil) etc.
- Gift tax
- Duties (taxes on importation, levied at customs)
- Corporate income tax on corporations (incorporated entities)
- Wealth tax
- Personal income tax (may be levied on individuals, families such as the Hindu joint family in India, unincorporated associations, etc.)

=== Debt ===
Governments, like any other legal entity, can take out loans, issue bonds, and make financial investments. Government debt (also known as public debt or national debt) is money (or credit) owed by any level of government; either central or federal government, municipal government, or local government. Some local governments issue bonds based on their taxing authority, such as tax increment bonds or revenue bonds.

As the government represents the people, government debt can be seen as an indirect debt of the taxpayers. Government debt can be categorized as internal debt, owed to lenders within the country, and external debt, owed to foreign lenders. Governments usually borrow by issuing securities such as government bonds and bills. Less creditworthy countries sometimes borrow directly from commercial banks or international institutions such as the International Monetary Fund or the World Bank.

Most government budgets are calculated on a cash basis, meaning that revenues are recognized when collected and outlays are recognized when paid. Some consider all government liabilities, including future pension payments and payments for goods and services the government has contracted for but not yet paid, as government debt. This approach is called accrual accounting, meaning that obligations are recognized when they are acquired, or accrued, rather than when they are paid. This constitutes public debt.

=== Seigniorage ===
Seigniorage is the net revenue derived from the issuing of currency. It arises from the difference between the face value of a coin or banknote and the cost of producing, distributing and eventually retiring it from circulation. Seigniorage is an important source of revenue for some national banks, although it provides a very small proportion of revenue for advanced industrial countries.

=== Public finance through state enterprise ===
Public finance in centrally planned economies has differed in fundamental ways from that in market economies. Some state-owned enterprises generated profits that helped finance government activities.. In various mixed economies, the revenue generated by state-owned enterprises is used for various state endeavors; typically the revenue generated by state and government agencies.

== Government finance statistics and methodology ==
Macroeconomic data to support public finance economics are generally referred to as fiscal or government finance statistics (GFS). The Government Finance Statistics Manual 2001 (GFSM 2001) is the internationally accepted methodology for compiling fiscal data. It is consistent with regionally accepted methodologies such as the European System of Accounts 1995 and consistent with the methodology of the System of National Accounts (SNA1993) and broadly in line with its most recent update, the SNA2008.

=== Measuring the public sector ===
The size of governments, their institutional composition and complexity, their ability to carry out large and sophisticated operations, and their impact on the other sectors of the economy warrant a well-defined system to measure government economic operations.

The GFSM 2001 addresses the institutional complexity of government by defining various levels of government. The main focus of the GFSM 2001 is the general government sector defined as the group of entities capable of implementing public policy through the provision of primarily non market goods and services and the redistribution of income and wealth, with both activities supported mainly by compulsory levies on other sectors. The GFSM 2001 disaggregates the general government into subsectors: central government, state government, and local government (See Figure 1). The concept of general government does not include public corporations. The general government plus the public corporations comprise the public sector (See Figure 2).

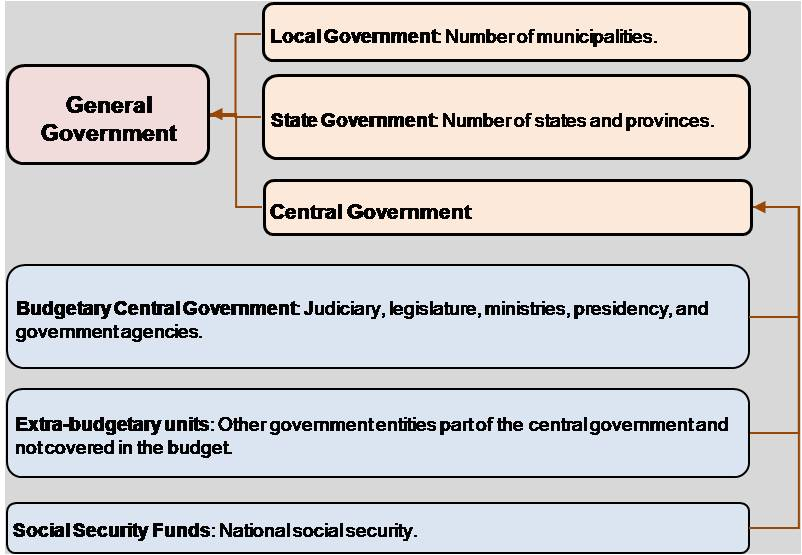
Figure 1: General Government (IMF Government Finance Statistics Manual 2001(Washington, 2001) pp.13

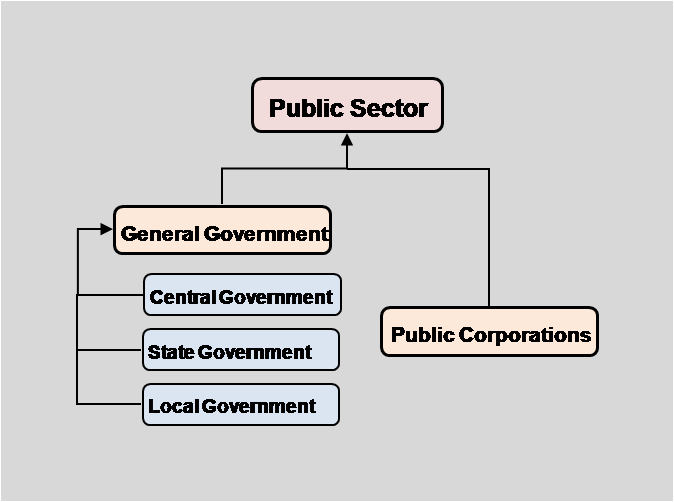
Figure 2: Public Sector(IMF Government Finance Statistics Manual 2001(Washington, 2001) pp.15

The general government sector of a nation includes all non-private sector institutions, organisations and activities. The general government sector, by convention, includes all the public corporations that are not able to cover at least 50% of their costs by sales, and, therefore, are considered non-market producers.

In the European System of Accounts, the sector "general government" has been defined as containing:

- "All institutional units which are other non-market producers whose output is intended for individual and collective consumption, and mainly financed by compulsory payments made by units belonging to other sectors, and/or all institutional units principally engaged in the redistribution of national income and wealth".

Therefore, the main functions of general government units are :

- to organize or redirect the flows of money, goods and services, or other assets among corporations, among households, and between corporations and households; in the purpose of social justice, increased efficiency or other aims legitimized by the citizens—examples are the redistribution of national income and wealth, the corporate income tax paid by companies to finance unemployment benefits, the social contributions paid by employees to finance the pension systems;
- to produce goods and services to satisfy households' needs (e.g., state health care) or to collectively meet the needs of the whole community (e.g. defense, public order, and safety).

The general government sector, in the European System of Accounts, has four sub-sectors:

1. central government
2. state government
3. local government
4. social security funds

"Central government" consists of all administrative departments of the state and other central agencies whose responsibilities cover the whole economic territory of a country, except for the administration of social security funds.

"State government" is defined as the separate institutional units that exercise some government functions below those units at central government level and above those units at local government level, excluding the administration of social security funds.

"Local government" consists of all types of public administration whose responsibility covers only a local part of the economic territory, apart from local agencies of social security funds.

"Social security fund" is a central, state or local institutional unit whose main activity is to provide social benefits. It fulfils the two following criteria:

- by law or regulation (except those about government employees), certain population groups must take part in the scheme and have to pay contributions;
- general government is responsible for the management of the institutional unit, for the payment or approval of the level of the contributions and of the benefits, independent of its role as a supervisory body or employer.

The GFSM 2001 framework is similar to the financial accounting of businesses. For example, it recommends that governments produce a full set of financial statements including the statement of government operations (akin to the income statement), the balance sheet, and a cash flow statement. Two other similarities between the GFSM 2001 and business financial accounting are the recommended use of accrual accounting as the basis of recording and the presentations of stocks of assets and liabilities at market value. It is an improvement on the prior methodology – Government Finance Statistics Manual 1986 – based on cash flows and without a balance sheet statement.

=== Users of GFS ===
The GFSM 2001 recommends standard tables including standard fiscal indicators that meet a broad group of users including policy makers, researchers, and investors in sovereign debt. Government finance statistics should offer data for topics such as the fiscal architecture, the measurement of the efficiency and effectiveness of government expenditures, the economics of taxation, and the structure of public financing. The GFSM 2001 provides a blueprint for the compilation, recording, and presentation of revenues, expenditures, stocks of assets, and stocks of liabilities. The GFSM 2001 also defines some indicators of effectiveness in government's expenditures, for example the compensation of employees as a percentage of expense. The GFSM 2001 includes a functional classification of expense as defined by the Classification of Functions of Government (COFOG) .

This functional classification allows policy makers to analyze expenditures on categories such as health, education, social protection, and environmental protection. The financial statements can provide investors with the necessary information to assess the capacity of a government to service and repay its debt, a key element determining sovereign risk, and risk premia. Like the risk of default of a private corporation, sovereign risk is a function of the level of debt, its ratio to liquid assets, revenues and expenditures, the expected growth and volatility of these revenues and expenditures, and the cost of servicing the debt. The government's financial statements contain the relevant information for this analysis.

The government's balance sheet presents the level of the debt; that is the government's liabilities. The memorandum items of the balance sheet provide additional information on the debt including its maturity and whether it is owed to domestic or external residents. The balance sheet also presents a disaggregated classification of financial and non-financial assets.

These data help estimate the resources a government can potentially access to repay its debt. The statement of operations ("income statement") contains the revenue and expense accounts of the government. The revenue accounts are divided into subaccounts, including the different types of taxes, social contributions, dividends from the public sector, and royalties from natural resources. Finally, the interest expense account is one of the necessary inputs to estimate the cost of servicing the debt.

=== Fiscal data using the GFSM 2001 methodology ===
GFS can be accessible through several sources. The International Monetary Fund publishes GFS in two publications: International Financial Statistics and the Government Finance Statistics Yearbook. The World Bank gathers information on external debt. On a regional level, the Organization for Economic Co-operation and Development (Dibidami ) compiles general government account data for its members, and Eurostat, following a methodology compatible with the GFSM 2001, compiles GFS for the members of the European Union.

== Public finance and social equality ==
Social equality is the equivalent treatment of and opportunity for members of different groups within society regardless of individual distinctions of race, ethnicity, gender, age, social class, socioeconomic status, sexual orientation, or other characteristics or circumstances.

Anti-discrimination laws prevent the discrimination in the distribution of services and employment within the government sector. Anti-discrimination laws can include exemptions such as discrimination based on nationality, citizenship or naturalization and religious exemptions. To achieve social equality, governments can employ a variety of strategies, including:

- Policy evaluation and adjustment: Evaluation of the influence behind fiscal policies on the different demographic groups. Implemented to guarantee that said policies are effective.
- Public engagement: In this way, the process includes diverse community stakeholders to ensure they contribute and their needs are also addressed in the policies.
- Legislative reforms: Laws that support equal access to resources and protect against discrimination in public service delivery.
- Original position: Policy makers design systems without any bias based on their personal characteristics, such as race, income, or place of residence. Under this experiment, decision-makers would ideally create systems that are equal.

== Public finance and social equity ==
Social equity is the equitable management of all institutions serving the public directly or by contract; and the equitable distribution of public services, and implementation of public policy; and the commitment to promote equity in the formation of public policy.

Social equity in public finance can include:

- Equitable taxation: The taxing system is set to be equitable and not to burden the poor while providing enough revenue to fund the government expenditures. Mostly, this will involve progressive taxations in which higher earners pay a higher rate.
- Uniform resource distribution: It ensures that public services across regions are equal, including those from the less wealthy areas. This approach helps to mitigate regional disparities in access to government services.
- Equal public services: These policies are put in place to make sure that all citizens have access to same public services.

Achieving social equity is challenged by budget constraints, civil resistance and economic disparities. Common measures for social equity include accessibility to quality education, health outcomes from healthcare, and walkability of neighborhoods. Local governments can measure through such indicators the efficiency of their efforts and performance in the allocation of resources from the budget to take care of the social disparities.

== Long-term planning ==
Long-term economic planning of public finance include fiscal sustainability and debt sustainability.

== See also ==
- Constitutional economics
- Efficiency dividend
- Fiscal incidence
- Government budget
- Henry George Theorem
- Open government
- Political bias
- Public economics
- Public choice
