= Owen Zidar =

American economist and academic (born 1985)

Owen M. Zidar
- Born: 1985 (age 40–41)
- Occupations: Economist and academic

Academic background
- Education: Dartmouth College; University of California, Berkeley
- Doctoral advisor: Alan J. Auerbach; Patrick Kline; Emmanuel Saez

Academic work
- Institutions: Princeton University; National Bureau of Economic Research
- Notable ideas: Research on inequality and tax policy

Owen M. Zidar (born 1985) is an American economist and academic. He is a professor of Economics and Public Affairs at the Princeton University Department of Economics and Princeton School of Public and International Affairs as well as a Research Associate at the National Bureau of Economic Research.

Zidar's research focuses on inequality, the taxation of companies and high-income earners, local fiscal policies, and the generation and allocation of economic profits. He is the recipient of the 2018 National Science Foundation CAREER Award, the 2020 Sloan Research Fellowship from the Alfred P. Sloan Foundation, and he was named Nicholas J. Nicholas Jr. Fellow by the Griswold Center for Economic Policy Studies at Princeton in 2020. Additionally, he was a Co-Editor of the Journal of Public Economics from 2020 to 2023 and the volume Policy Responses to Tax Competition in 2024.

== Education and early career ==
Zidar earned a BA in economics from Dartmouth College in 2008. From 2010 to 2011, he held the position of Staff Economist for the Council of Economic Advisers, and obtained a PhD in economics from the University of California, Berkeley, receiving the first prize for his dissertation from the W.E. Upjohn Institute in 2014.

== Career ==
Zidar began his academic career as an assistant professor at the University of Chicago Booth School of Business in 2014. He visited the Princeton University Department of Economics from 2017 to 2018. He was appointed assistant professor in 2018, Associate Professor in 2019, and has been Professor of Economics and Public Affairs at the Princeton University Department of Economics and Princeton School of Public and International Affairs since 2020.

Among his professional appointments, Zidar assumed the role of Faculty Research Fellow at the National Bureau of Economic Research from 2014 to 2018, subsequently becoming a Research Associate, a position he continues to hold.

== Research ==
Zidar has contributed to the field of public economics by studying the broader policy tools beyond individual income tax and transfer systems, emphasizing the role of firms and regional disparities in mediating inequality, with the goal of offering an empirical assessment of equity-efficiency tradeoffs for policymakers. He was listed in the top 0.1% of economists in terms of research output in the last ten years by IDEAS/RePEc.

=== Firms and inequality ===
Zidar examine policy responses to inequality, emphasizing an understanding of its causes. In collaborative research, he used full-population tax return data to study the role of firms in generating inequality, and showed that the ownership of private "pass-through" firms is especially concentrated at the top of the income distribution. His work also demonstrated that nearly half of the rise of reported income of the top 1% since 1980 and the decline in the aggregate labor share results from "pass-through" business profit growth. Additionally, in a paper published in the Quarterly Journal of Economics, he explored the nature of top incomes among private firm-owners, revealing that a significant portion of top pass-through profit reflects human capital rather than financial capital. He further used these data to identify entrepreneurs and characterize the lives of people who create high-growth firms, and investigated the effects of patent grants on firm profitability and the extent to which these rents are shared with different types of workers.

In 2022, Zidar used new data, including linked firm-owner data, to account for heterogeneous returns when estimating top wealth, exploring the implications for capital taxation and inequality, revealing lower wealth concentration estimates and significant influence from private business ownership.

=== Business income taxation ===
Zidar has researched business income taxation throughout his career. Alongside Juan Carlos Suárez Serrato, he empirically and theoretically reexamined the conventional view of corporate taxation, finding that approximately 40% of the burden fell on firm owners, with landowners and workers sharing the remaining 60%, while also contributing to the corporate tax literature and highlighting the role of firm heterogeneity in local labor markets. They extended this work by showing how the state corporate tax base has become more generous for firms and the impact of these changes on tax revenue and economic growth. Furthermore, he investigated state and local business incentives and the effects of business tax reforms, including the 2017 Tax Cuts and Jobs Act (TCJA), on firm performance and outcomes for workers and owners.

Collaborating with Gabriel-Chodorow Reich, Eric Zwick, and Matt Smith, Zidar used tax data to examine the corporate responses to the TCJA, which was the biggest business tax cut in U.S. history, finding that taxes boosted investment but also substantially increased the deficit.

=== Spatial policies ===
Zidar's work on spatial policies has centered on the variation in income and opportunity across regions. In a joint research effort, he initiated an agenda addressing regional disparities and fiscal challenges by analyzing state tax rates' effects on worker and firm location, suggesting regional tax policy coordination and examining proposed tax reforms to tackle income disparities and improve tax efficiency.

=== Aggregate effects of taxes ===
Zidar evaluated the approach of taxing top earners as a means of addressing inequality. He studied the impact of tax changes for top earners on economic growth using U.S. state-level income distribution and federal tax changes to determine regional tax shocks, finding that tax cuts for lower-income groups drove the positive relationship between tax cuts and growth, while the effect of tax changes for the top 10% on employment growth over the medium term was minimal.

== Awards and honors ==
- 2014 – Dissertation Award First Prize, W.E. Upjohn Institute for Employment Research
- 2016, 2017 – Excellence in Refereeing awards, American Economic Review
- 2018 – CAREER Award, National Science Foundation
- 2020 – Sloan Research Fellowship, Alfred P. Sloan Foundation
- 2020 – Nicholas J. Nicholas Jr. Fellow, Griswold Center for Economic Policy Studies at Princeton

== Selected articles ==
- Suárez Serrato, J. C., & Zidar, O. (2016). Who benefits from state corporate tax cuts? A local labor markets approach with heterogeneous firms. American Economic Review, 106(9), 2582–2624.
- Fajgelbaum, P. D., Morales, E., Suárez Serrato, J. C., & Zidar, O. (2019). State taxes and spatial misallocation. The Review of Economic Studies, 86(1), 333–376.
- Kline, P., Petkova, N., Williams, H., & Zidar, O. (2019). Who profits from patents? rent-sharing at innovative firms. The quarterly journal of economics, 134(3), 1343–1404.
- Smith, M., Yagan, D., Zidar, O., & Zwick, E. (2019). Capitalists in the twenty-first century. The Quarterly Journal of Economics, 134(4), 1675–1745.
- Smith, M., Zidar, O., & Zwick, E. (2023). Top wealth in America: New estimates under heterogeneous returns. The Quarterly Journal of Economics, 138(1), 515–573.
- Chodorow-Reich, G., Smith, M., Zidar, O. M., & Zwick, E. (2024). Tax policy and investment in a global economy (No. w32180). National Bureau of Economic Research.
