= Irene Pollin =

American sports executive (1924–2020)

- Born: Irene Sue Kerchek; June 29, 1924; St. Louis, Missouri, U.S.
- Died: July 28, 2020 (aged 96); Amherst, Massachusetts, U.S.
- Occupations: Sports executive; philanthropist
- Spouse: Abe Pollin (m. 1945, died 2009)

Irene Sue Pollin (née Kerchek; June 29, 1924 – July 28, 2020) was an American sports executive and philanthropist.

Pollin was born in St. Louis, Missouri on June 29, 1924. She married Abe Pollin in 1945 and moved to Washington, D.C. In 1963, Pollin's 16-year-old daughter Linda died from a congenital heart defect, and she suffered from depression for several years. Pollin decided to return to school, earning a bachelor’s degree in anthropology from American University in 1971 and a master’s degree in social work from the Catholic University of America in 1974.

Pollin started a counseling practice at Washington Hospital Center and published two books on counseling.

In 1999, Pollin started a foundation called Sister to Sister, dedicated to teaching women about heart-disease risk. In 2008, Pollin donated $12 million to Brigham and Women’s Hospital to establish the Linda Joy Pollin Cardiovascular Wellness Program. In 2012, a $10 million donation to Hadassah Medical Center established the Linda Joy Pollin Cardiovascular Wellness Institute. In 2013, she donated $10 million to the Johns Hopkins University Hospital center for the prevention of heart disease, and she also gave $10 million to establish the Linda Joy Pollin Women’s Heart Health Program at Cedars-Sinai Medical Center.

Pollin became the majority owner of the Washington Wizards and the Washington Mystics after her husband's death in 2009. They had previously also owned the Washington Capitals. Pollin would turn the franchises over to Ted Leonsis who would go on to form Monumental Sports & Entertainment.

In 2016, Pollin published an autobiography, Irene and Abe: An Unexpected Life.

Pollin died on July 28, 2020, at her home in Amherst, Massachusetts. She is survived by two sons, Robert Pollin and James Pollin.
