= Carmen Reinhart =

American economist

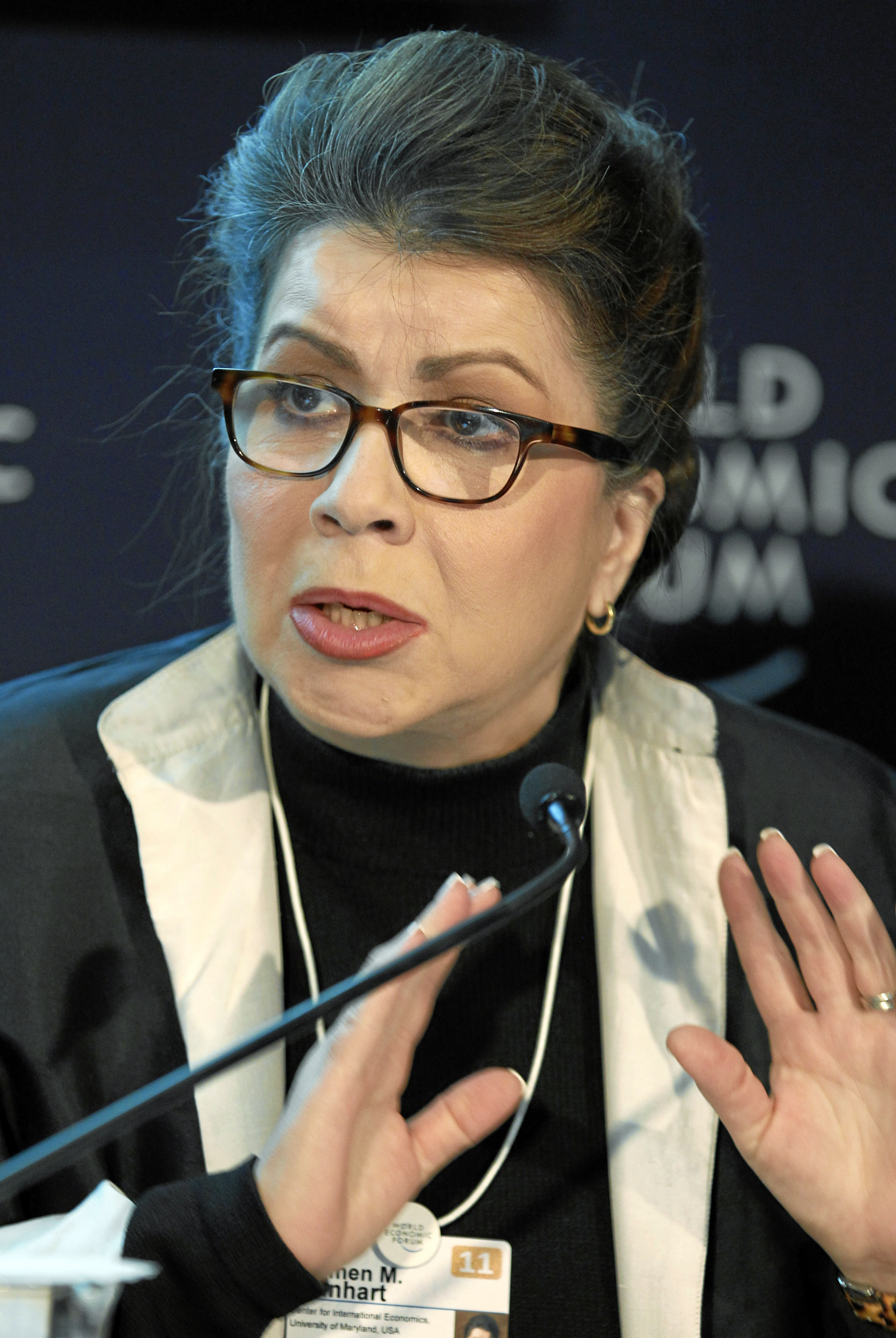

Chief Economist of the World Bank
- In office 15 June 2020 – 30 June 2022
- President: David Malpass
- Preceded by: Aart Kraay (acting)
- Succeeded by: Aart Kraay (acting)

Personal details
- Born: 7 October 1955 (age 71) Havana, Cuba
- Education: Miami Dade College (attended); Florida International University (BA); Columbia University (MA, PhD)

Academic background
- Doctoral advisor: Robert Mundell

Academic work
- Discipline: International economics
- Institutions: Harvard Kennedy School
- Awards: King Juan Carlos Prize in Economics (2018)
- Website: Information at IDEAS / RePEc

Carmen M. Reinhart (née Castellanos, born October 7, 1955) is a Cuban-American economist and the Minos A. Zombanakis Professor of the International Financial System at Harvard Kennedy School. Previously, she was the Dennis Weatherstone Senior Fellow at the Peterson Institute for International Economics and Professor of Economics and Director of the Center for International Economics at the University of Maryland. She is a research associate at the National Bureau of Economic Research, a Research Fellow at the Centre for Economic Policy Research, Founding Contributor of VoxEU, and a member of Council on Foreign Relations. She is also a member of American Economic Association, Latin American and Caribbean Economic Association, and the Association for the Study of the Cuban Economy. She became the subject of general news coverage when mathematical errors were found in a research paper she co-authored.

On May 20, 2020, Reinhart was appointed World Bank Chief Economist, starting on June 15, 2020.

According to Research Papers in Economics (RePec), Reinhart is ranked among the top economists worldwide, based on publications and scholarly citations. She has testified before Congress and is listed among Foreign Policy's Top 100 Global Thinkers, Thomson Reuters' The World's Most Influential Scientific Minds, and Bloomberg Markets Most Influential 50 in Finance. In December 2018, Reinhart received the King Juan Carlos Prize in Economics and Nabe's Adam Smith Award.

== Early life ==
Born in Havana, Cuba, Reinhart arrived in the United States on January 6, 1966, at the age of 10, with her mother and father and three suitcases. They settled in Pasadena, California, during the early years before moving to South Florida, where she grew up. When the family moved to Miami, Reinhart started college at two-year Miami Dade College, before transferring to Florida International University, where she received a B.A. in Economics (summa cum laude) in 1975. After her B.A., Reinhart worked for her master's degree in philosophy, eventually receiving this degree in 1981 from Columbia University. A few years down the road, Reinhart also received her Ph.D. from Columbia University in 1988.

== Career ==
Recommended by Peter Montiel, an M.I.T. graduate teaching at FIU, Reinhart in 1978 went on to attend Columbia University graduate school. After Reinhart passed her field examinations, she was hired as an economist by Bear Stearns and rose to the investment bank's chief economist three years later. In 1988 she returned to Columbia to obtain her Ph.D. under the supervision of Robert Mundell. In the 1990s, she held several positions in the International Monetary Fund. From 2001 to 2003, she returned to the International Monetary Fund as deputy director at the Research Department. She has been the Minos A. Zombanakis Professor of the International Financial System at Harvard Kennedy School since 2012.

She has served on the editorial boards of The American Economic Review, the Journal of International Economics, International Journal of Central Banking, among others.

In both 2011 and 2012, she was included in the 50 Most Influential ranking of Bloomberg Markets.

Outside of Reinhart's professional activities, she has received compensation for conference-related and speaking engagements, advisory boards, as well as writing and royalties.

=== Awards and honours ===
In the June 2023 Graduation Ceremonies at University of St Andrews, Reinhart was awarded Doctor of Laws (LLD), in recognition of her major contribution to economics.

== Research and publication ==
She has written and published on a variety of topics in macroeconomics and international finance, including: international capital flows, capital controls, inflation and commodity prices, banking and sovereign debt crises, currency crashes, and contagion. Her work has been published in scholarly journals such as The American Economic Review, the Journal of Political Economy, the Quarterly Journal of Economics, and the Journal of Economic Perspectives. Her work is featured in the financial press, including The Economist, Newsweek, The Washington Post, and The Wall Street Journal. Her book (with Kenneth Rogoff), This Time is Different: Eight Centuries of Financial Folly, studied the striking similarities of the recurring booms and busts that have characterized financial history. Her work has helped to inform the understanding of financial crises in both advanced economies and emerging markets. It has been translated to over 20 languages and won the Paul A. Samuelson Award, among others.

She also has written monthly columns for international media organization Project Syndicate since 2014.

== Work on the 2008 near-meltdown and the Great Recession of 2008 & 2009 ==
Fellow economist Alan Blinder credits both Reinhart and Kenneth Rogoff with describing highly relevant aspects of the 2008 financial crisis and the Great Recession.

In a normal recession such as 1991 or 2000, the Keynesian tools of tax cuts and infrastructure spending (fiscal stimulus), and lowered interest rates (monetary stimulus), will usually right the economic ship in a matter of months and lead to recovery and economic expansion. Even the serious recession of 1982, which Blinder states "was called the Great Recession in its day", fits comfortably within this category of a typical recession, which will respond to the standard tools.

By contrast, the 2008 near-meltdown destroyed parts of the financial system and left other parts reeling and in serious need of de-leveraging. Large amounts of governmental debt, household debt, corporate debt, and financial institution debt were left in its wake. And because of this debt, the normal tools of tax cuts and increased infrastructure spending were somewhat less available and/or politically difficult to achieve. Indeed, economist Paul Krugman argued that even the combination of the Oct. 2008 bailout plus the Feb. 2009 bailout did not go big enough, although Blinder states that they were large compared to previous bailouts. Moreover, since interest rates were already near zero, the standard monetary tool of lowering rates was not going to provide much help.

Crediting the two economists, Alan Blinder writes that recovering from a “Reinhart-Rogoff recession“ may require debt forgiveness, either directly or indirectly by encouraging somewhat higher than normal inflation.

== Criticism and controversy ==
In 2013, Reinhart and Rogoff were in the spotlight after researchers discovered that their 2010 paper "Growth in a Time of Debt" in The American Economic Review Papers and Proceedings had methodological and computational errors. The work argued that debt above 90% of GDP was particularly harmful to economic growth, while corrections have shown this is not the case, and that the negative correlation between debt and growth does not increase above 90% as their work had contended. A separate and previous criticism is that the negative correlation between debt and growth need not be causal. Rogoff and Reinhart claimed that their fundamental conclusions were accurate, despite the errors.

A review by Herndon, Ash, and Pollin of her widely cited paper with Rogoff, "Growth in a Time of Debt", argued that "coding errors, selective exclusion of available data, and unconventional weighting of summary statistics lead to serious errors that inaccurately represent the relationship between public debt and GDP growth among 20 advanced economies in the post-war period".

== Personal life ==
Reinhart met her husband, Vincent Reinhart, when they were classmates at Columbia University in the late 1970s. They have one son.

== Selected publications ==
- Reinhart, Carmen, and Vincent Reinhart. "The Crisis Next Time: What We Should Have Learned from 2008." Foreign Affairs 97.6 (November/December 2018): 84–97.
- Reinhart, Carmen M., Vincent Reinhart, Christoph Trebesch. "Global Cycles: Capital Flows, Commodities, and Sovereign Defaults, 1815–2015." The American Economic Review 106.5 (May 2016): 574–580.
- Reinhart, Carmen M., and Christoph Trebesch. "Sovereign Debt Relief and Its Aftermath." Journal of the European Economic Association 14.1 (February 2016): 215–251.
- Reinhart, Carmen M., and Christoph Trebesch. "The International Monetary Fund: 70 Years of Reinvention." The Journal of Economic Perspectives 30.1 (January 2016): 3–27
- Kenneth Rogoff, and Carmen Reinhart. (2010) "Growth in a Time of Debt." American Economic Review 100.2: 573–578.
- Graciela Kaminsky and Carmen Reinhart. (1999). "The Twin Crises: The Causes of Banking and Balance-of-Payments Problems". American Economic Review, 473–500.
- Kenneth Rogoff and Carmen Reinhart. (2009). This Time is Different: Eight Centuries of Financial Folly. Princeton University Press. ISBN 1400831725, 9781400831722

Diplomatic posts
Preceded by Aart Kraay; Acting	Chief Economist of the World Bank; 2020–2022	Succeeded by Aart Kraay; Acting
