= Graciela Kaminsky =

Professor of Economics and International Affairs

- Citizenship: American

Academic background
- Education: MIT
- Website: https://www.gracielakaminsky.com

Graciela Laura Kaminsky is a professor of economics and international affairs at George Washington University and a faculty research associate at the National Bureau of Economic Research. Kaminsky studied economics at the Massachusetts Institute of Technology where she received her Ph.D. In 1984 she did a brief research stay at the Argentine Central Bank, later in 1985 she moved to San Diego as an assistant professor at the University of California. In 1992 she worked on the board of governors of the US Federal Reserve System, later in 1998 she was appointed a full professor at George Washington University, where she works at the Elliot School of International Affairs. Kaminsky has been a visiting scholar at the Bank of Japan, the Bank of Spain, the Federal Reserve Bank of New York, the Hong Kong Monetary Authority, and the Central Bank of France.

Kaminsky’s research focuses on contagion, currency and financial crises, exchange rates, fiscal and monetary policies, international capital flows as well as sovereign debt crises. She has published many academic journals, including the American Economic Review, the Journal of Economic Perspectives, Journal of Development Economics, Journal of Monetary Economics and the Journal of International Economics. Furthermore, her research has been highlighted in the financial media such as Business Week, The Financial Times and The Economist.
