= Abe Pollin =

American sports businessman (1923–2009)

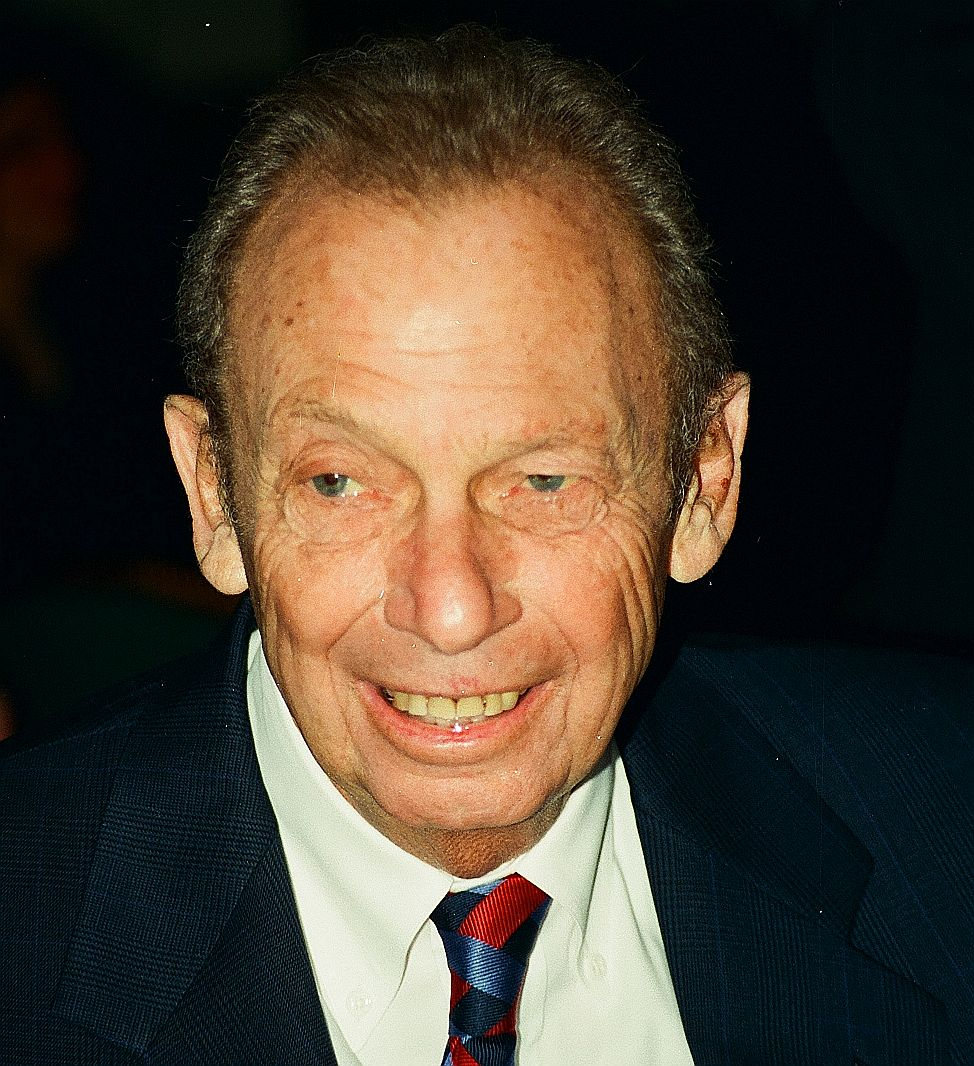
- Pollin in 1998
- Born: December 3, 1923; Philadelphia, Pennsylvania, U.S.
- Died: November 24, 2009 (aged 85); Washington, D.C., U.S.
- Occupations: Building contractor Real estate developer Sports team owner Philanthropist
- Known for: Owner of the: Washington Capitals; Washington Mystics; Washington Wizards
- Spouse: Irene Kerchek (m. 1945)
- Children: 4, including Robert

Abraham J. Pollin (December 3, 1923 – November 24, 2009) was a real estate developer, professional sports team owner, and philanthropist in the Washington metropolitan area. He owned the Washington Capitals in the National Hockey League (NHL), the Washington Mystics in the Women's National Basketball Association (WNBA), and the Baltimore / Washington Bullets / Wizards in the National Basketball Association (NBA). Pollin was the longest-tenured owner of an NBA team, holding the Chicago / Baltimore / Washington franchise for 46 years. He also owned the Capital One Arena, which he financed, as well as the Capital Centre.

Pollin is often given credit for revitalizing Downtown Washington, D.C. by building the Capital One Arena.

== Biography ==
Pollin was born in Philadelphia on December 3, 1923, to Jennie and Morris Pollin, American Jews. His family's original surname was Pollinovsky which was shortened to Pollin by Morris upon his arrival at Ellis Island from Russia in 1914. When he was 8, Pollin's family moved to the Washington area from Philadelphia. Pollin graduated from Theodore Roosevelt High School in 1941 and George Washington University with a Bachelor of Business Administration in 1945, where he became a brother of Zeta Beta Tau.

=== Real estate development ===
After graduating in 1945, Pollin took a job with his family's construction company, where he worked for 12 years. He launched his own construction company in 1957. Pollin amassed a considerable fortune as a developer during the 1960s, constructing offices and apartment buildings in the Washington metropolitan area.

=== Sports ===
Along with Earl Foreman and real estate investor/former NBA referee Arnold Heft, Pollin purchased the then-Baltimore Bullets from Dave Trager for $1.1 million in November 1964. Pollin bought out his partners in 1965.

He moved the team to the Washington area in 1973 after building the Capital Centre in suburban Landover, Maryland. In 1996, Pollin announced that he was changing the team's name because he felt the name "Bullets" had too many negative connotations at a time of high crime in Washington, D.C. A contest yielded the name "Wizards."

In 1995, Pollin signed an agreement with Washington D.C. Mayor Marion Barry in which Pollin agreed to spend $180 million, financed by banks, to design and build what is now the Capital One Arena. The city acquired the land and prepared the site for development. Pollin leveraged everything he had, against the advice of his financial advisors, because he wanted to make an impact on the city.

In 1999, Pollin sold the Capitals and minority stakes in the Wizards and the arena to Ted Leonsis for approximately $200 million. Leonsis bought the remaining interests in 2010 following Pollin's death.

=== Death ===
Pollin died on November 24, 2009, at age 85, of corticobasal degeneration, a rare brain disease. At the time of his death, he was the longest-tenured owner in NBA history. His death led to the 2010 sale of the Washington Wizards and the Verizon Center to Ted Leonsis, who merged the team with the Washington Capitals under the Monumental Sports umbrella. Pollin was posthumously praised by league officials and D.C. leaders for his commitment to the city, specifically for privately financing the arena that revitalized downtown Washington, D.C."

== Personal life ==
Pollin and his wife, Irene Pollin (née Kerchek) were married on May 27, 1945, in Washington, D.C. The couple had four children, three sons and one daughter: Linda Joy (1947–1963), Robert N. (born 1950), Kenneth Jay (1952–1954), and James Edward (born 1958). Linda and Jay both suffered from congenital heart disease, leading to Jay's death at the age of 14 months old and Linda's death at the age of 16. After Linda's death, her father was so distraught that he quit his construction business and took a year off of work to recuperate from the loss.

Pollin was a Democrat and helped Marvin Mandel get elected as Governor of Maryland in 1969.

=== Philanthropy ===
In 1988, Pollin partnered with Melvin Cohen to award college scholarships to 59 fifth-graders in Seat Pleasant, Maryland.

Beginning in 2002, an award called "The Pollin Award" has been awarded annually to someone based on their dedication and impact to the Washington, D.C. community. Notable winners of the award have included Harvey C. Barnum, Jr., 2005 Teacher of the Year, Jason Kamras and 2006 Miss District of Columbia, Kate Michael.

In 2008, Pollin donated $1 million to the Society for Progressive Supranuclear Palsy. He made donations totaling $3 million toward finding a cure for corticobasal degeneration.

Pollin served as chairman of the Advisory Council for UNICEF and traveled to Uganda to oversee the disbursement of relief funds. Pollin served on the board of the International Red Cross and Red Crescent Movement and was president of the advisory board of the American Foundation for Autistic Children. He also worked with business and government leaders in Washington to help the city's homeless population.

== Awards and recognition ==
- In 1999, Pollin received the Golden Plate Award of the American Academy of Achievement.
- In March 2009, Pollin was inducted into the George Washington University School of Business Sports Executives Hall of Fame.
- In March 2011, he was inducted into the National Jewish Sports Hall of Fame.
- The block of F Street NW where Capital One Arena is located was named "Abe Pollin Way".
- Washington, D.C. Mayor Adrian Fenty named December 3, 2007, "Abe Pollin Day".

Sporting positions
| First | Washington Capitals owner 1974–1999 | Succeeded by Ted Leonsis |
| First | Baltimore Bullets owner Capital Bullets owner Washington Bullets/Wizards owner 1964–2009 | Succeeded by Ted Leonsis |
