= Fiscal gap =

Economic measurement

The fiscal gap is a measure of a government's total indebtedness proposed by economists Laurence Kotlikoff and Alan Auerbach, who define it as the difference between the present value of all of government's projected financial obligations, including future expenditures, including servicing outstanding official federal debt, and the present value of all projected future tax and other receipts, including income accruing from the government's current ownership of financial assets. According to Kotlikoff and Auerbach, the "fiscal gap" accounting method can be used to calculate the percentage of necessary tax increases or spending reductions needed to close the fiscal gap in the long-run.

Generational accounting, an accounting method closely related to the fiscal gap, has been proposed by the same authors as a measure of the future burden of closing the fiscal gap. The "generational accounting" assumes that current taxpayers are neither asked to pay more in taxes nor receive less in transfer payments than current policy suggests and that successive younger generations' lifetime tax payments net of transfer payments received rise in proportion to their labor earnings.

According to Kotlikoff and Auerbach, "fiscal gap accounting" and "generational accounting" reports have been done for roughly 40 developed and developing countries either by their treasury departments, finance ministries, or central banks, or by the IMF, the World Bank, or other international agencies, or by academics and think tanks.

== Size of the U.S. fiscal gap ==
Fiscal gap accounting is not new to the U.S. government. The Social Security Trustees and Medicare Trustees have been presenting such calculations for their own systems for years in their annual reports. And generational accounting has been included in the President's Budget on three occasions.

Based on calculations using the 2012 Alternative Fiscal Scenario long-term projections by the Congressional Budget Office, some estimate the U.S. fiscal gap stands to be $222 trillion – more than 13 times larger than the reported U.S. National Debt. According to the same estimates, the gap grew $11 trillion from 2011 to 2012. Eliminating the entire U.S. fiscal gap through revenue alone would require a permanent 64% increase in all federal taxes. Alternatively, closing the gap through spending reductions alone would require a permanent 40% cut in all federal purchases and transfer payments.

== Criticism of fiscal gap accounting ==
The proposed "fiscal gap" accounting method has been criticized as fundamentally flawed by economists Dean Baker, Bradford DeLong, and Paul Krugman. Their critiques, referenced above, center on the fact that fiscal gap accounting calculates the growth future debt in current account terms, without taking into account the fact that future GDP will also grow proportionately, with the result that future debt will fall on generations with substantially larger incomes to cover the debt, obviating the seeming fiscal impossibility of covering the gap. These criticism are misplaced. Auerbach and Kotlikoff's generational accounting fully adjusts for productivity growth. It assumes the lifetime net tax burden facing future generations rises for successive generations by the economy's productivity growth rate. Thus, if, under current law, a generation born this year would, on average, face a 30 percent lifetime net tax rate (lifetime net taxes divided by the present value of labor earnings) and closing the fiscal gap would require that figure to rise to, say, 50 percent, all young and future generations would face 50 percent lifetime net tax rates.
