= Gerald Epstein =

American psychiatrist (1935–2019)

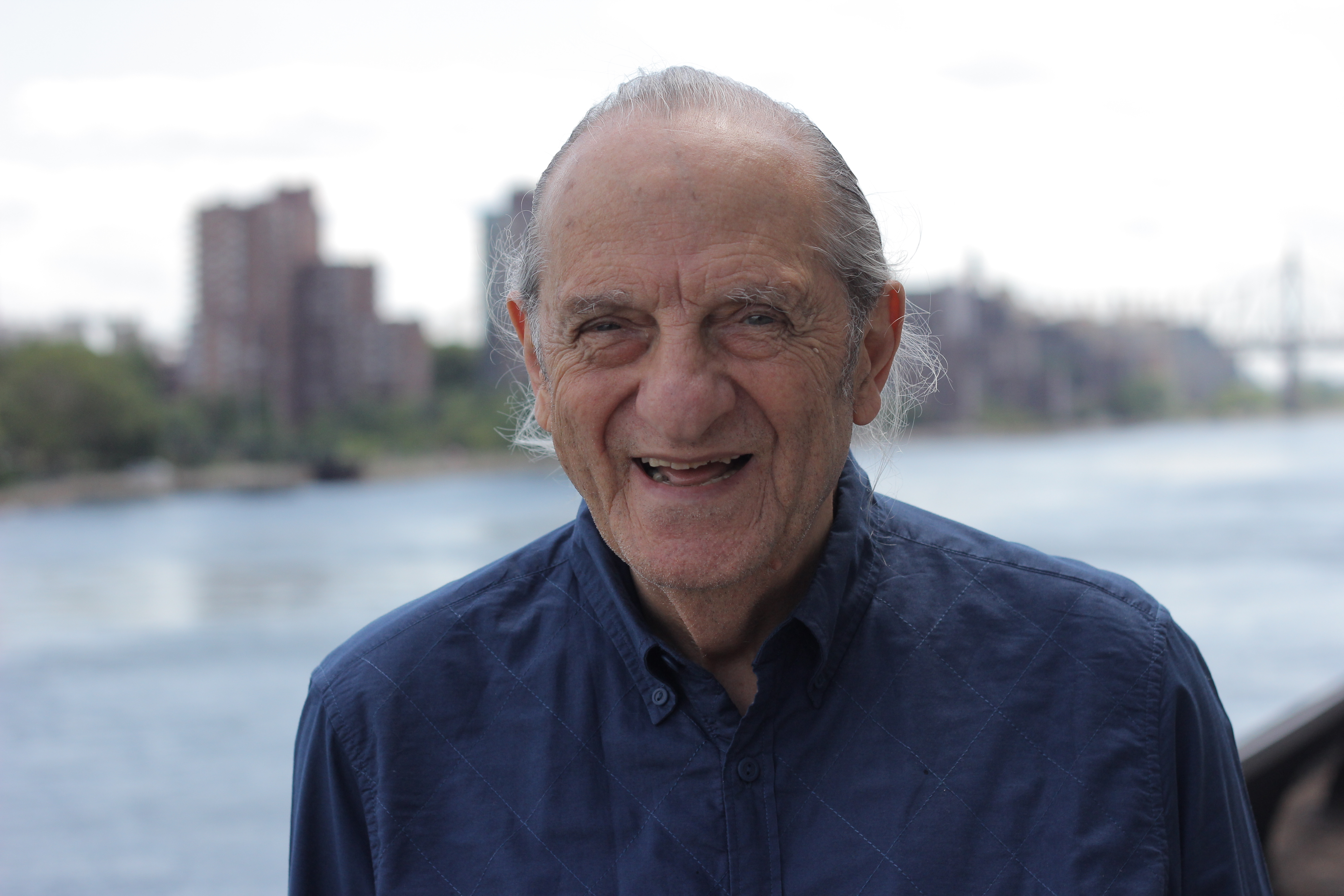
- Epstein in 2015
- Born: November 6, 1935
- Died: February 18, 2019 (aged 83)
- Citizenship: American
- Education: Dickinson College; New York Medical College; Stamford Hospital; Kings County Hospital; New York Psychoanalytic Society
- Known for: Development of the use of mental imagery to treat psychiatric and physical disorders
- Scientific career
- Fields: Psychiatry
- Workplaces: American Institute for Mental Imagery

Gerald N. Epstein (November 6, 1935 – February 18, 2019) was an American psychiatrist who used mental imagery and other mental techniques to treat physical and emotional problems. An author and a researcher, he was the founder and director of a mental imagery school for post-graduate mental health professionals, teaching imagery as a tool for healing and a "bridge to the inner world".

== Education and early professional career ==
Epstein received his formal training as a medical doctor at New York Medical College, New York, NY, graduating in 1961. In 1961–62, he completed a rotating internship at Stamford Hospital, Stamford, CT, and in 1962–65, he took a residency in psychiatry at Kings County Hospital, Brooklyn, NY. In 1965, he began a private practice in New York City as a psychoanalyst. He trained in Freudian psychoanalysis at the New York Psychoanalytic Institute, graduating in 1972. In 1973, he co-founded The Journal of Psychiatry and Law, which Epstein edited from 1973 through 1986. In 1975, he became an assistant clinical professor of psychiatry at New York's Mt. Sinai Medical Center.

== Epiphany ==
In 1974, Epstein experienced what he calls an "epiphany". In Jerusalem as a visiting professor in law and psychiatry, he met a young man who reported that three years of extensive psychoanalysis had not succeeded in freeing him of his depression but that four sessions with a local healer who practiced "waking dream therapy" had cured him. Epstein arranged a meeting with the healer, a woman named Colette Béatrice Aboulker-Muscat, who, at her death in 2003, "had an international reputation as a . . . healer of body and mind who employed visualization and dream interpretation." Epstein's epiphany came after he suggested to Aboulker-Muscat that since Freud had proposed to analysts that they elicit free association by asking patients to imagine being on a train with an analyst and describing to the analyst everything the patient sees while looking out a window, one could consider Freud's free association a form of mental imagery. Aboulker-Muscat asked, "In what direction does the train go?" Disconcerted, Epstein made a horizontal gesture with his hand. Aboulker-Muscat made a vertical gesture in response. "What if the direction was changed to this axis?" Fifteen years later, Epstein described this moment in born-again language:

I felt an overwhelming sense of self-recognition, an 'aha' experience. It was an epiphany. The vertical movement seemed to lift me from the horizontal hold of the given, the ordinary patterns of everyday cause and effect. I leapt into freedom, and I saw that the task of therapy . . . was to help realize freedom, to go beyond the given to the newness that we all are capable of. . . .This is what imagery, I have come to learn, makes possible.

Epstein studied imagery with Aboulker-Muscat for nine years. In New York, he closed his Freudian practice and opened a new practice based on mental imagery.

== Imagery institute ==
In 1982, Epstein founded and became the director of The Colette Aboulker-Muscat Center for Waking Dream Therapy, a post-graduate training center for imagery chartered by the New York State Regents. The school offers post-graduate courses for licensed mental health professionals and provides classes for the general public. In 1994, the school was renamed The American Institute for Mental Imagery.

== Books ==
Epstein's first book for fellow professionals appeared in 1980, Studies in Non-Deterministic Psychology, an edited collection of papers (two by Epstein) presenting "outstanding" analytic efforts to develop "integrated non-deterministic" approaches to understanding human behavior. A second book for professionals was published in 1981, Waking Dream Therapy: Dream Process as Imagination, which examines the method and purpose of waking dream, a process in which a patient continues in waking life the action of a dream from a previous night. The result, Epstein claims, is freedom from the conditioned behavior that "we habitually live with." In 1989, Epstein's first self-help book appeared, Healing Visualizations: Creating Health Through Imagery, a collection of imagery exercises for treating 76 physical or emotional ailments, arranged alphabetically from acne to worry. In its 19th printing as of 2009, with more than 100,000 copies in print, it has been translated into 11 languages and published in 13 countries. A second self-help book appeared in 1994, Healing Into Immortality: A New Spiritual Medicine of Healing Stories and Imagery, in which Epstein argues that "the essential teaching of spiritual medicine is that we possess the means for healing ourselves through the use of our inner mental processes" and that these processes derive from the Bible. In 1999, Epstein released Climbing Jacob's Ladder: Finding Spiritual Freedom through Stories in the Bible, "a fresh understanding of the biblical stories that inform the spiritual heritage and practices of the West." His next book, Kabbalah for Inner Peace, provides a contemporary approach to the 4,000 year old spiritual tradition known as Visionary Kabbalah - interweaving the teaching with more than 60 imagery exercises. In November 2012, he co-edited the Encyclopedia of Mental Imagery with Barbarah Fedoroff. This book serves as a compendium of 2100 mental imagery exercises, drawn from the original work of Colette Aboulker-Muscat. This work was named one of "The Best Spiritual Books of 2012" by Spirituality & Practice. Epstein's final opus, We Are Not Meant to Die: How to Choose Life in Every Moment published posthumously, juxtaposes biblical teachings about longevity (Methuselah lived 969 years) and Eternal Life (Enoch ascends to heaven) with modern research in how we may slow down and even reverse the aging process. Included are Epstein's GEMS Medical Model, the Death Plan (errors of living that age us), the Life Plan (practices for longevity) as well over 90 imagery exercises.

== Audios ==
In 2003, Epstein's issued his first audio, an eight CD set, The Natural Laws of Self-Healing, which consists of twelve "laws" drawn from his practice and his study and understanding of the spiritual principles of life. A second audio, a 6-CD set, appeared in 2007, The Phoenix Process: One-Minute a Day to Health, Longevity, and Well-Being, which describes four self-help practices, one for each of four common life problems—self-doubt, feelings of emergency, indecisiveness, and physical and emotional ailments – all of which, Epstein argues, physically wear away the body and shorten one's life. In 2010, he released Emotional Mastery: Life Transformation Through Higher Consciousness, a work intended for learning to face the stresses of the everyday life: including moving beyond negative states of mind, finding the right job, creating income, and improving your self-image.Healing Visualizations, Epstein's first and best known self-help work, was released in audiobook format in 2014.

== Research ==
=== Waking dream ===
Toward the end of the 1970s, Epstein participated in a study of 127 subjects to investigate the experiences of "self-hypnosis, waking dreaming, and mindfulness meditation." Reports by participants indicated that the images they experienced in waking dream had a more "vivid inner reality," that they were more aware of the images' "immediate impact," and that they were less likely to see the images as their own creation.

=== Asthma ===
In the mid-1990s, Epstein collaborated with Elizabeth Ann Manhart Barrett, then the coordinator of the Center for Nursing Research at Hunter College, City University of New York, and with other colleagues, to conduct two studies on the use of mental imagery by adults experiencing asthma. The first study, funded by the Office of Alternative Medicine of the National Institutes of Health, examined the quantitative effects of imagery, comparing 17 participants who used mental imagery as a treatment for their asthma and 16 participants who did not. Among the group using mental imagery, eight people (47 percent) reduced or discontinued their medication, while in the group not using imagery, no one discontinued their medication and only three people (19 percent) reduced it. People using imagery also indicated that they had increased their ability to make choices and their overall power to create changes in their lives. The second study used a phenomenological, qualitative approach to explore the experience of the people using mental imagery to alleviate their asthma. With responses from 14 participants, researchers found that the use of mental imagery helped these people to feel more powerful and in some cases "profoundly affected" in favorable ways their views of themselves—for example, relieving them of the fear that they would forget their inhaler and die from an asthma attack.

== Critical reception ==
Epstein has consistently maintained that imagery works in a matter of minutes or less when used for a number of days. Martin Rossman, also a practitioner of mental imagery and the author of a book on imagery, challenged this contention in a review of Healing Visualizations, pointing to an exercise that Epstein claimed could remove the feeling of aimlessness if done "once a day, for three to five minutes, for three days." Rossman wrote:

Perhaps Dr. Epstein is seeing patients less seriously aimless than I, . . . but I . . . have not generally seen loss of direction in life to respond to nine minutes of treatment with or without visualization.

Epstein responded that his claims were based on his clinical experiences.

All of the imagery in Healing Visualizations has been tried in clinical situations over the . . . years that I have made imagery the central focus and treatment modality of my clinical work. . . The imagery summons new possibilities. . . and can thus result in the rapid relief of ailments or symptoms – like aimlessness – within a short period of time.
