= Debt Sustainability Analysis =

Debt Sustainability Analysis (DSA) or Debt Sustainability Model (DSM) is an analysis of a nation's capacity done by the International Monetary Fund and the World Bank Group that helps determine whether the nation can service its ensuing debt and fiscal policy objectives without making excessively large adjustments that could potentially compromise its stability. It is often used to gauge a developing nation's financing requirements and capacity to make repayments.

For example, in March 2021 Kenya and Madagascar were assessed.

== See also ==
- Fiscal sustainability
- Debt crisis
