= Japan and the International Monetary Fund =

Japan joined the International Monetary Fund (IMF) on August 13, 1952. Since then, Japan has sustained a stable relationship with the IMF and supported the Fund's various work, including analysis, policy advice, financial assistance, notable technical assistance support, and capacity development.

Since 1990, Japan has significantly contributed to IMF technical assistance programs; these programs have helped train officials from developing countries in making economic policies, with a regional focus on the Asia-Pacific area. Japan promoted the establishment of the Regional Office for Asia and the Pacific (OAP), which works as the outpost of the IMF in the Asia-Pacific region, keeping member countries updated with the IMF policies and economic data. Japan also operated two scholarship programs to encourage the advanced study of macroeconomy and prepare officials from the Aisa-Pacific region for policy making.

== Background ==
Japan has been a member of the IMF since August 13, 1952, the year Japan regained independence. Japan accepted the decision, calling from the IMF for a quota of US$250 million in 1952. During the early stage of its membership in the IMF, Japan remained in the role of passive rule-taker. This situation changed due to Japan's growing economic weight in the international economy since the mid-1980s. Japan increased its involvement and voice in the IMF and asked for an increase in quota to ensure the voting power. By 1990, Japan succeeded in placing itself to the second largest provider of the IMF quota (after the United States) on the executive board. Currently, Japan has a quota of 30,820.5 million SDRs, which comprises 6.47% of the IMF total quotas. Japan has 309,664 votes in the IMF, which comprises 6.14% of the total votes.

The current Board of Governor representing Japan in the IMF is Shunichi Suzuki and the alternate Board of Governor is Haruhiko Kuroda. Japan has not borrowed from the IMF since it changed its status to an IMF Article VIII nation in April 1964.

== Contributions ==
=== Technical assistance programs ===
Under the IMF's Framework Administered Account for Selected Fund Activities published in 2010, Japan created the Japan Sub-account (JSA) to finance technical assistance programs. Technical assistance programs are used to train IMF member countries in formulating, implementing, and maintaining an effective economic policy. Between 1990 and 2020, Japan financed US$464 million in nominal dollars through JSA to technical assistance projects, making Japan the largest contributor to IMF technical assistance and training since 1990. The Ministry of Finance, which is responsible for financing multilateral financial institutions, including the World Bank, supported the JSA-funded technical assistance activities.

In 2003, Japan showed its priorities for supporting technical assistance activities in its Official Development Assistance (ODA) Charter of 2003. In a 2010 ODA report, Japan stated its focus on promoting technical assistance to developing countries by sharing experience with post-war reconstruction, policy making strategies, and technologies. JSA funding has helped 130 IMF member countries around the world, with a focus on low- and lower-middle-income countries in the Asia and Pacific area. The channelled technical assistance to these areas has been comprised over 50% of the approved JSA technical assistance activities.

=== Regional Office for Asia and the Pacific (OAP) ===
Japan was the main promoter for the establishment of Regional Office for Asia and the Pacific (OAP) in Tokyo in 1997. The OAP serves as the IMF's interface with Asia-Pacific region, consisting of 37 member states including Japan, New Zealand, Nepal, Philippines, and China. As one of the major regional offices for the IMF, the role of the OAP has 3 major aspects:

1. Economic Surveillance and Research: The OAP regularly monitors and reports the economic development of Asia-Pacific region. The office carries out research based on the regional interest and makes policy advice on economic development.
2. Capacity Development: The OAP trains the officials from Asia-Pacific region for policy making abilities. It operates the Japan-IMF Scholarship Programs for Asia (JISPA) for young officials to further their study of macroeconomics and related fields at Japanese universities. Since the start of the program in 1993, around 730 alumni received a degree from the program and held major policy making positions in their countries. Moreover, multiple seminars and short training programs are carried out for Asian officials.
3. Outreach: By conducting regular conferences, seminars, workshops for Asian policy making officials, scholars and experts, the OAP keeps its member countries abreast of the latest IMF policies and global economic dynamics. It also informs member countries with regional data, analysis and policy recommendations. The OAP expands its voices on the Internet by maintaining the OAP and JISPA websites to keep member countries updated with the IMF policies and other economic information.

=== Scholarships ===
Japan supports two scholarship programs: the Japan-IMF Scholarship Program for Asia (JISPA), started in 1993, and the Japan-IMF Scholarship Program for Advanced Studies (JISP), started in 1996. These two scholarships programs support officials from the Asia-Pacific region, helping them pursue advanced macroeconomic study and assisting them in policymaking.

JISP provides opportunities for Japanese nationals to pursuit a Ph.D. degree in macroeconomics and strives to train future economics for the IMF. There are seven scholarships rewarded annually for JISP.

== COVID-19 era ==
=== COVID-19 Crisis Capacity Development Initiative ===
To combat the COVID-19 crisis and the potential fiscal challenges faced by emerging markets and developing countries, Japan contributed $10 billion to the newly launched the COVID-19 Crisis Capacity Development Initiative (CCCDI). The CCCDI was launched in June 2020 by IMF Managing Director Kristalina Georgieva; its partners are Japan, Germany, China, Canada, Korea, Belgium, Switzerland, Spain, and Singapore. Besides providing help for the urgent needs of developing countries, the initiative also strives to forward the tax policy, inclusive growth, digitalization, transparency, and accountability in response to the economic crisis.

=== Trusts ===
In helping low-income countries recover from the ongoing COVID-19 pandemic crisis and better prepare for the next crisis, Japan boosted its support for the IMF's Catastrophe Containment and Relief Trust. Japan provided an additional US$100 million to the relief trust in April 2020. By boosting additional contribution to the trust, Japan helped the poorest countries and most vulnerable countries combat the threat of pandemic.

In April 2020, Japan announced its intention to double its contribution to the IMF's Poverty Reduction and Growth Trust, which was 3.6 billion SDRs at the time. This trust aimed at helping emerging markets and developing countries to achieve sustainable growth with an enhanced ability to respond to immediate health crisis or economic challenges.
