= List of IMF people =

The following is an evolving list of notable current and former employees of the International Monetary Fund (IMF).

== List ==
- Christine Lagarde - President of the European Central Bank, first female head of the IMF
- Eswar Prasad - Professor at Cornell University
- Kenneth Rogoff – Author, former IMF Chief Economist, Professor at Harvard University, Grandmaster (chess)
- Maurice Obstfeld – IMF Chief Economist, Professor of Economics at University of California, Berkeley
- Michael Mussa – Former IMF Chief Economist, former member of the Council of Economic Advisors
- Mohamed El-Erian – Former CEO and co-chief investment officer of PIMCO, Chief Economic Adviser of Allianz
- Nicoletta Batini – Director, Department of the Treasury, Ministry of Economy and Finance (Italy)
- Olivier Blanchard – Robert M. Solow Professor of economics at MIT, former IMF Chief Economist
- Raghuram Rajan – 23rd Governor of Reserve Bank of India, Vice-chairman of the Bank for International Settlements, former IMF Chief Economist
- Robin Brooks – Chief FX Strategist, managing director, Goldman Sachs
- Rodrigo Valdés – Finance Minister of Chile
- Simon Johnson – Ronald A. Kurtz Professor at MIT Sloan School of Management, former IMF Chief Economist
- Stanley Fischer – Vice Chair of U.S. Federal Reserve System, former Governor of Bank of Israel, former Chief Economist of the World Bank, former first deputy managing director of the IMF
- Timothy Geithner – Former U.S. Treasury Secretary, former President of the Federal Reserve Bank of New York
- Min Zhu – Former IMF Deputy Managing Director, former People's Bank of China Deputy Governor
- Jitendra Gopal Borpujari - economist on the executive board of the IMF from 1996 to 2005.
- Carlo Cottarelli - former Prime Minister of Italy. Credited as a founder of the IMF's annual soccer tournament: The Global Stability Cup.
- Ruperto Majuca - Senior Economist. International Monetary Fund from 2022 to present.
