= Symmetrical inflation target =

Method to control inflation

A symmetrical inflation target is a requirement placed on a central bank to respond when inflation is too low as well as when inflation is too high.

For example, the Bank of England and the Bank of Canada have symmetrical inflation targets. Following the strategy review led by the new president Christine Lagarde and finalised in July 2021, also the European Central Bank adopted a symmetric inflation target of two per cent over the medium term and officially abandoned the asymmetric "below but close to two percent" definition.
