= National Statistics Office of Georgia =

Georgia's principal government institution in charge of statistics and census data

National Statistics Office of Georgia (GeoStat)
- საქართველოს სტატისტიკის ეროვნული სამსახური (საქსტატი)
- Coat of Arms of Georgia

- Logo of GeoStat

Agency overview
- Formed: 2009
- Headquarters: Tbilisi
- Agency executive: Gogita Todradze, Executive Director
- Website: geostat.ge

The National Statistics Office (GeoStat) (Georgian: საქართველოს სტატისტიკის ეროვნული სამსახური, sak'art'velos statistikis erovnuli samsakhuri; საქსტატი, sak'stati) is an agency in charge of national statistics and responsible for carrying out population, agricultural and other censuses in Georgia. It was established as a legal entity of public law according to the December 11, 2009 law of Georgia, succeeding the Department of Statistics of the Ministry of Economy and Sustainable Development of Georgia. The head office is located in Tbilisi.

== History ==
The earliest references to the collection of statistics in Georgia date from the 13th century. Materials from population censuses made in the seventeenth and eighteenth centuries in various regions of the country have survived to the present day.

On November 15, 1918 a temporary Statistical Bureau was formed within the Ministry of Agriculture of the Democratic Republic of Georgia. The bureau's functions included development of materials for agricultural census, accounting of the available land and determining of norms for its distribution. On the basis of law enacted by the Constituent Assembly on July 25, 1919, a Republican Statistical Committee was formed within the same ministry. The committee was assigned to manage all types of statistical works of national importance. During the Soviet rule (1921–1991), the national statistics service was provided by the Central Statistics Division. In a newly independent Georgia, it was succeeded by the Social and Economic Information Committee established at the Parliament of Georgia (1991–1995), the State Department of Social and Economic Information (1995–1997), and the State Department of Statistics of Georgia (1997–2004). The department was subordinated to the Ministry of Economy and Sustainable Development in 2004 and made an independent agency under the current name in 2010.

== Mission ==
GeoStat is an official authority exclusively responsible for production and dissemination of official statistics in accordance with international statistical standards and requirements. Its principal purposes are collection, editing, processing, storage, analysis and dissemination of exhaustive, up to date, reliable and com¬pa¬rable statistical data. One of the main functions of GeoStat is provision of official statistics to the civil society, official authorities, NGOs (non-governmental organizations), the mass media, business and academic communities and other categories of users. Its information is open and accessible to all users. GeoStat regularly publishes the country's social and economic indicators on its website.

== Structure ==
The agency is led by the executive director, who is appointed by the Prime Minister of Georgia for the term of 4 years. The Executive Director also acts as the Chairman of the GeoStat Board which consists of 8 members. The agency consists of the central office and eleven regional branches. The present structure of the GeoStat was put in place following a reorganisation in 2018. It consists of 10 Departments: Strategic Planning, Coordination and Communication Department, Information Technology Department, Internal Audit Department, National Accounts Department, Social Statistics Department, Population Census and Demography Department, Price Statistics Department, Business Statistics Department, External Trade and Foreign Investments Statistics Department, Agriculture and Environment Statistics Department. Apart from subject divisions there are 11 regional bureaus which are also structural units of GeoStat.

== International cooperation ==
GeoStat actively cooperates with international organizations such as the UN, its regional and specialized agencies, Eurostat, other international organizations, and statistical institutions of various countries. Since Georgia joined the International Monetary Fund's Special Data Dissemination Standard (SDDS) in 2010, GeoStat acquired a coordinating role of its implementation through other government institutions such as the Ministry of Finance and the National Bank of Georgia. Over 2011-2018 GeoStat has been involved in a major bilateral cooperation project with Statistics Sweden covering such areas as National accounts, Price statistics, Statistical methods, etc.
