= Jitendra Gopal Borpujari =

Indian economist

- Born: 31 August 1942; Barbheta, Assam, India
- Died: 16 December 2009 (aged 67)
- Education: Clare College, University of Cambridge (PhD)
- Employer: World Bank International Monetary Fund Centre for Strategic and International Studies
- Known for: Fiscal Policy
- Board member of: International Monetary Fund

Jitendra Gopal Borpujari (31 August 1942 – 16 December 2009) was an economist on the executive board of the International Monetary Fund from 1996 to 2005, and the Principal Economist of the Socio-Economic Data Division at World Bank.

His initial research focused on the effect of British policies on the Indian economy, which later progressed to research on fiscal policy for developing economies.

== Education ==
Jitendra was born in Barbheta in Jorhat district of Assam, India. He attended the Jorhat Government High School and Cotton College, matriculating in 1958 and 1960, respectively. He pursued an Economics Honours from Madras Christian College and a Masters in Economics from Delhi University. He secured a Commonwealth Scholarship to pursue his PhD from Clare College, Cambridge University, UK and graduated in 1969. He joined World Bank as an economist shortly after receiving his doctorate.
