= International Monetary Fund Managing Director 2011 election =

2011 internal election for the IMF

The 2011 election for the Managing Director of the International Monetary Fund (IMF) was an election to determine the successor to IMF Managing Director Dominique Strauss-Kahn, who had resigned from the position in May 2011 following allegations that he had sexually assaulted a hotel maid. The winner of the election would serve a five-year term as the 11th Managing Director of the IMF, described as the most powerful position in the organisation. Four candidates contested the election: Agustín Carstens, Governor of the Bank of Mexico, Christine Lagarde, Minister of Finance in France, Stanley Fischer, the 8th Governor of the Bank of Israel, and Grigori Marchenko, chairman of the National Bank of Kazakhstan. The election was won by Christine Lagarde who served in the role until 2019 after being reelected by consensus in 2016.

The election saw the candidates travel internationally to gain support. Frequent criticisms leveled against the IMF gained prominence during the election. This included the "unwritten rule" that the Managing Director must be from a European country and, preferably, from a developed economy. This included a statement from the BRICS states (Brazil, Russia, India, China, and South Africa) being released, declaring that the tradition of appointing a European as the Managing Director undermined the legitimacy of the IMF and called for the appointment to be merit-based. As of 2025, no Managing Director of the IMF has ever been a non-European, and no Director came from a non-developed economy until Lagarde's successor, Kristalina Georgieva.
