= Catastrophe Containment and Relief Trust =

The Catastrophe Containment and Relief Trust is a bailout fund of the International Monetary Fund.

== History ==
On 13 April, the IMF announced that 25 member countries had applied to the CCRT fund for relief of the COVID-19 pandemic.

== See also ==
Frequently Asked Questions on the Catastrophe Containment and Relief Trust
