= International Monetary Fund =

Financial institution and UN specialized agency

- The Seal of the International Monetary Fund

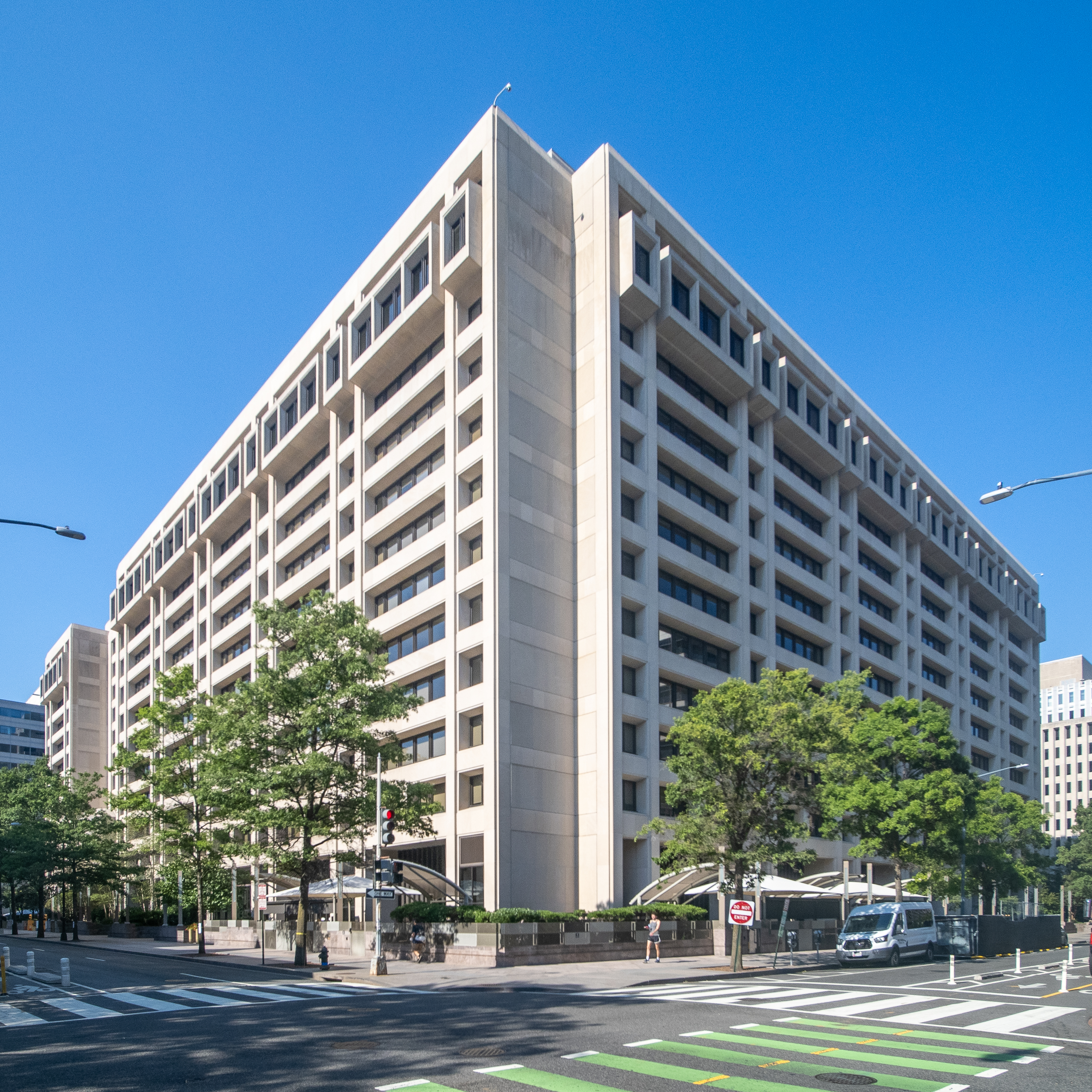
- Headquarters in Washington, D.C.
- Abbreviation: IMF
- Formation: 22 July 1944; 82 years ago
- Type: International financial institution
- Purpose: Promote international monetary co-operation, facilitate international trade, foster sustainable economic growth, make resources available to members experiencing balance of payments difficulties, prevent and assist with recovery from international financial crises
- Headquarters: 700 19th Street NW, Washington, D.C., U.S.
- Coordinates: 38°53′56″N 77°2′39″W
- Region served: Worldwide
- Members: 191 countries (190 UN countries and Kosovo)
- Official language: English
- Managing Director: Kristalina Georgieva
- First Deputy Managing Director: Dan Katz
- Chief Economist: Silvana Tenreyro
- Main organ: Board of Governors
- Parent organization: United Nations
- Budget: $1,295 million (2023)
- Staff: 3,100
- Website: imf.org

The International Monetary Fund (IMF) is an international financial institution and a specialized agency of the United Nations, headquartered in Washington, D.C. It consists of 191 member countries, and its stated mission is "working to foster global monetary cooperation, secure financial stability, facilitate international trade, promote high employment and sustainable economic growth, and reduce poverty around the world". The IMF acts as a lender of last resort to its members experiencing actual or potential balance of payments crises.

Established in July 1944 at the Bretton Woods Conference based on the ideas of Harry Dexter White and John Maynard Keynes, the IMF came into formal existence in 1945 with 29 member countries and the goal of reconstructing the international monetary system. For its first three decades, the IMF oversaw the Bretton Woods system of fixed exchange rate arrangements. Following the collapse of this system in 1971, the Fund's role shifted to managing balance-of-payments difficulties and international financial crises, becoming a key institution in the era of globalization.

Through a quota system, countries contribute funds to a pool from which they can borrow if they experience balance-of-payments problems; a country's quota also determines its voting power. As a condition for loans, the IMF often requires borrowing countries to undertake policy reforms, known as structural adjustment. The organization also provides technical assistance and economic surveillance of its members' economies.

The IMF's loan conditions have been criticized for imposing austerity measures that can hinder economic recovery and harm the most vulnerable populations. Critics argue that the Fund's policies limit the economic sovereignty of borrowing nations and that its governance structure is dominated by Western countries, which hold a disproportionate share of voting power. The current managing director is Bulgarian economist Kristalina Georgieva, who has served since 1 October 2019 and began a second five-year term on 1 October 2024.

== History ==
=== 20th century ===
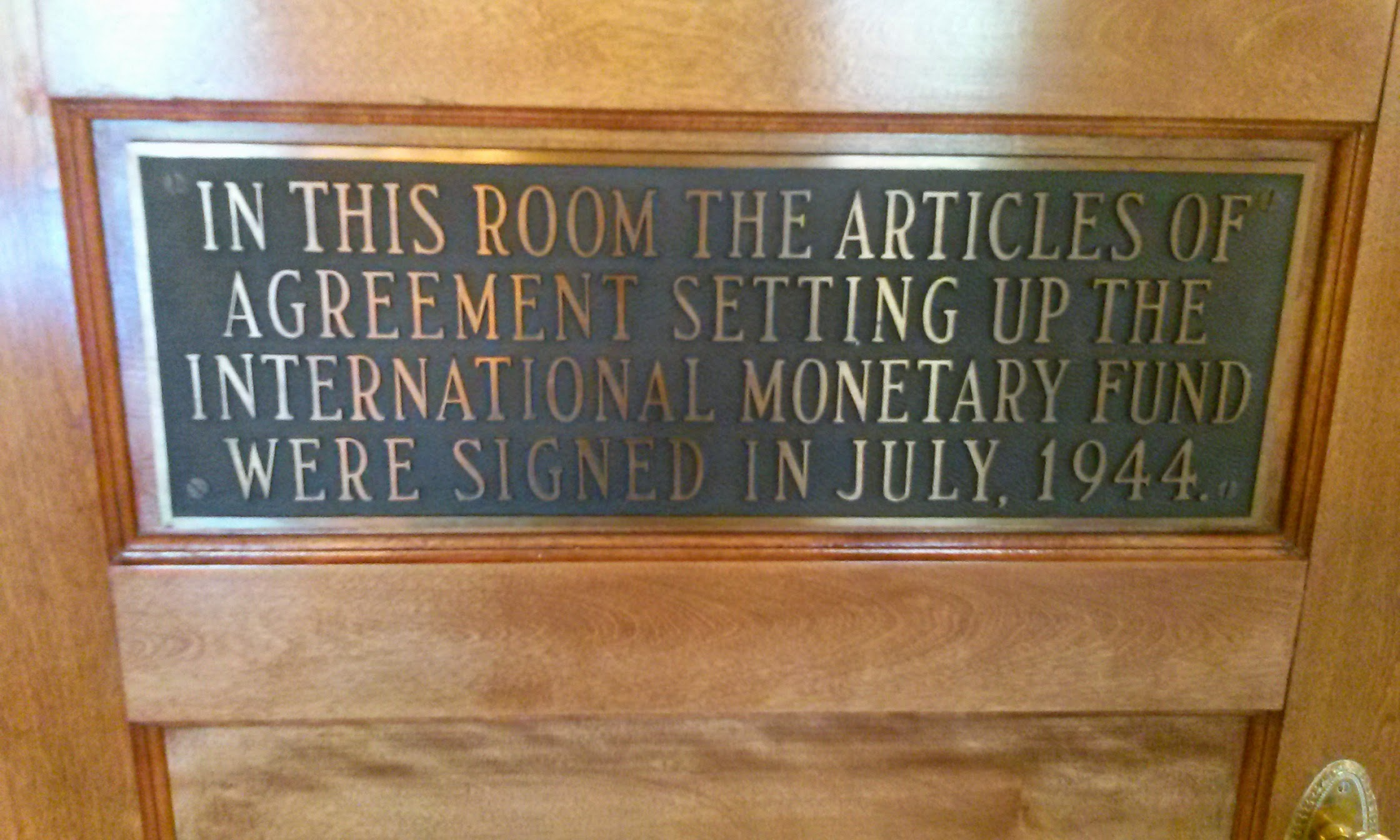
Plaque Commemorating the Formation of the IMF in July 1944 at the Bretton Woods Conference

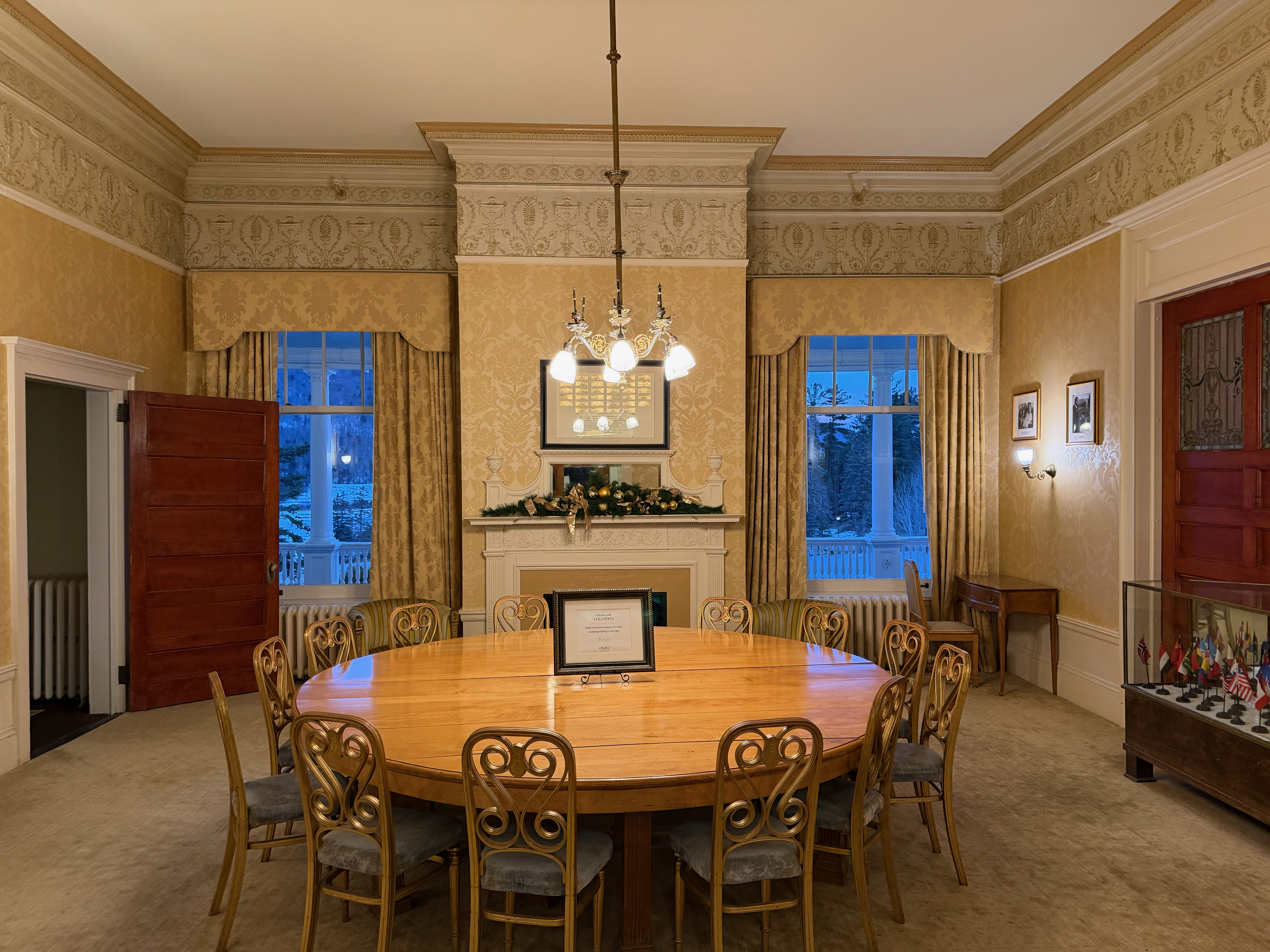
The Gold Room within the Mount Washington Hotel, where the Bretton Woods Conference attendees signed the agreements creating the IMF and World Bank

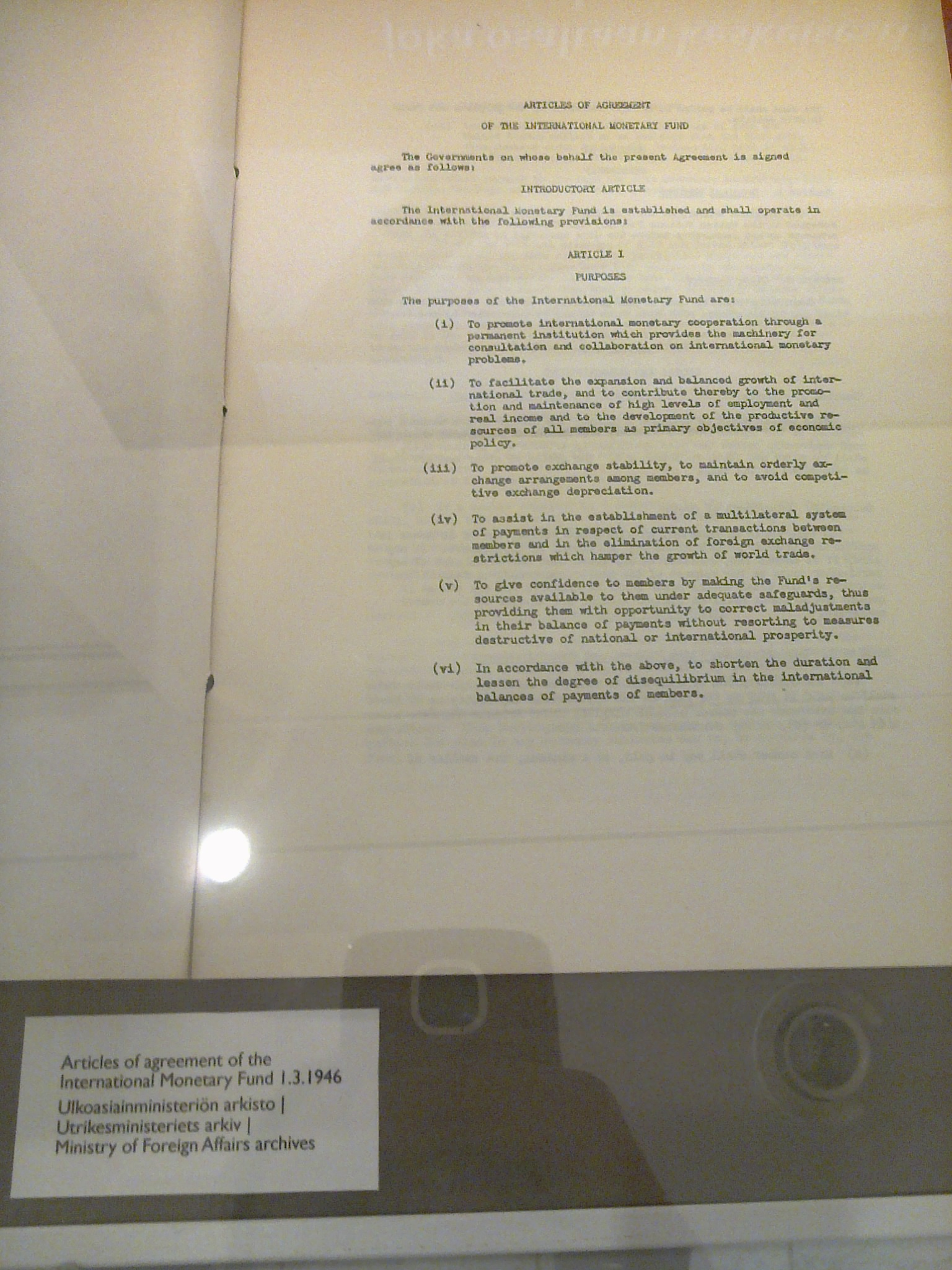
First page of the Articles of Agreement of the International Monetary Fund, 1 March 1946, Finnish Ministry of Foreign Affairs archives

The IMF was originally laid out as a part of the Bretton Woods system exchange agreement in the year 1944. During the Great Depression, countries sharply raised barriers to trade in an attempt to improve their failing economies. This led to the devaluation of national currencies and a decline in world trade.

This breakdown in international monetary cooperation created a need for oversight. The representatives of 45 governments met at the Bretton Woods Conference in the Mount Washington Hotel in Bretton Woods, New Hampshire, in the United States, to discuss a framework for postwar international economic cooperation and how to rebuild Europe.

There were two views on the role the IMF should assume as a global economic institution. American delegate Harry Dexter White foresaw an IMF that functioned more like a bank, making sure that borrowing states could repay their debts on time. Most of White's plan was incorporated into the final acts adopted at Bretton Woods. British economist John Maynard Keynes, on the other hand, imagined that the IMF would be a cooperative fund upon which member states could draw to maintain economic activity and employment through periodic crises. This view suggested an IMF that helped governments and act as the United States government had during the New Deal to the great depression of the 1930s.

The agreement at Bretton Woods implied that both the IMF and the World Bank would be headquartered in the United States. US Treasury Secretary Henry Morgenthau Jr. intended them to be located in New York, but his successor Fred M. Vinson unilaterally decided that they would be in Washington, D.C. instead, noting that "the institutions would be fatally prejudiced in American opinion if they were placed in New York, since they would then come under the taint of 'international finance'". The IMF formally came into existence on 27 December 1945, when the first 29 countries ratified its Articles of Agreement. By the end of 1946 the IMF had grown to 39 members. On 1 March 1947, the IMF began its financial operations, and on 8 May France became the first country to borrow from it.

The IMF was one of the key organizations of the international economic system; its design allowed the system to balance the rebuilding of international capitalism with the maximization of national economic sovereignty and human welfare, also known as embedded liberalism. The IMF's influence in the global economy steadily increased as it accumulated more members. Its membership began to expand in the late 1950s and during the 1960s as many African countries became independent and applied for membership. But the Cold War limited the Fund's membership, with most countries in the Soviet sphere of influence not joining until the 1970s and 1980s.

The Bretton Woods exchange rate system prevailed until 1971 when the United States government suspended the convertibility of the US$ (and dollar reserves held by other governments) into gold. This is known as the Nixon Shock. The changes to the IMF articles of agreement reflecting these changes were ratified in 1976 by the Jamaica Accords. Later in the 1970s, large commercial banks began lending to states because they were awash in cash deposited by oil exporters. The lending of the so-called money center banks led to the IMF changing its role in the 1980s after a world recession provoked a crisis that brought the IMF back into global financial governance.

In the mid-1980s, the IMF shifted its narrow focus from currency stabilization to a broader focus of promoting market-liberalizing reforms through structural adjustment programs. This shift occurred without a formal renegotiation of the organization's charter or operational guidelines. The Ronald Reagan administration, in particular Treasury Secretary James Baker, his assistant secretary David Mulford and deputy assistant secretary Charles Dallara, pressured the IMF to attach market-liberal reforms to the organization's conditional loans.

During the 20th century, the IMF shifted its position on capital controls. Whereas the IMF permitted capital controls at its founding and throughout the 1970s, IMF staff increasingly favored free capital movement from 1980s onwards. This shift happened in the aftermath of an emerging consensus in economics on the desirability of free capital movement, retirement of IMF staff hired in the 1940s and 1950s, and the recruitment of staff exposed to new thinking in economics.

=== 21st century ===
The IMF provided two major lending packages in the early 2000s to Argentina (during the 1998–2002 Argentine great depression) and Uruguay (after the 2002 Uruguay banking crisis). However, by the mid-2000s, IMF lending was at its lowest share of world GDP since the 1970s.

In May 2010, the IMF participated, in 3:11 proportion, in the first Greek bailout that totaled €110 billion, to address the great accumulation of public debt, caused by continuing large public sector deficits. As part of the bailout, the Greek government agreed to adopt austerity measures that would reduce the deficit from 11% in 2009 to "well below 3%" in 2014. The bailout did not include debt restructuring measures such as a haircut, to the chagrin of the Swiss, Brazilian, Indian, Russian, and Argentinian Directors of the IMF, with the Greek authorities themselves (at the time, PM George Papandreou and Finance Minister Giorgos Papakonstantinou) ruling out a haircut.

A second bailout package of more than €100 billion was agreed upon over the course of a few months from October 2011, during which time Papandreou was forced from office. The so-called Troika, of which the IMF is part, are joint managers of this programme, which was approved by the executive directors of the IMF on 15 March 2012 for XDR 23.8 billion and saw private bondholders take a haircut of upwards of 50%. In the interval between May 2010 and February 2012 the private banks of Holland, France, and Germany reduced exposure to Greek debt from €122 billion to €66 billion.

As of January 2012, the largest borrowers from the IMF in order were Greece, Portugal, Ireland, Romania, and Ukraine.

On 25 March 2013, a €10 billion international bailout of Cyprus was agreed by the Troika, at the cost to the Cypriots of its agreement: to close the country's second-largest bank; to impose a one-time bank deposit levy on Bank of Cyprus uninsured deposits. No insured deposit of €100k or less were to be affected under the terms of a novel bail-in scheme.

The topic of sovereign debt restructuring was taken up by the IMF in April 2013, for the first time since 2005, in a report entitled "Sovereign Debt Restructuring: Recent Developments and Implications for the Fund's Legal and Policy Framework". The paper, which was discussed by the board on 20 May, summarised the recent experiences in Greece, St Kitts and Nevis, Belize, and Jamaica. An explanatory interview with deputy director Hugh Bredenkamp was published a few days later, as was a deconstruction by Matina Stevis of The Wall Street Journal.

In the October 2013, Fiscal Monitor publication, the IMF suggested that a capital levy capable of reducing Euro-area government debt ratios to "end-2007 levels" would require a very high tax rate of about 10%.

The Fiscal Affairs department of the IMF, headed at the time by Acting Director Sanjeev Gupta, produced a January 2014 report entitled "Fiscal Policy and Income Inequality" that stated that "Some taxes levied on wealth, especially on immovable property, are also an option for economies seeking more progressive taxation ... Property taxes are equitable and efficient, but underutilized in many economies ... There is considerable scope to exploit this tax more fully, both as a revenue source and as a redistributive instrument."

In late 2019, the IMF estimated global growth in 2020 to reach 3.4%, but due to the coronavirus, in November 2020, it expected the global economy to shrink by 4.4%.

In March 2020, Kristalina Georgieva announced that the IMF stood ready to mobilize $1 trillion as its response to the COVID-19 pandemic. This was in addition to the $50 billion fund it had announced two weeks earlier, of which $5 billion had already been requested by Iran. One day earlier on 11 March, the UK called to pledge £150 million to the IMF catastrophe relief fund. It came to light on 27 March that "more than 80 poor and middle-income countries" had sought a bailout due to the coronavirus.

On 13 April 2020, the IMF said that it "would provide immediate debt relief to 25 member countries under its Catastrophe Containment and Relief Trust (CCRT)" programme.

In February 2026, the International Monetary Fund (IMF) urged the United States to work with its trading partners to mutually ease trade restrictions and address unfair practices, warning that sweeping tariffs and export controls under the Trump administration had disrupted supply chains and could drag on economic activity. The IMF's review also highlighted concerns about the rising public debt and called for narrowly applied national security trade measures to minimise negative cross-border effects as part of its annual assessment of the U.S. economy.

In April 2026, the fund downgraded its global growth forecast for 2026 due to the inflationary shocks and energy infrastructure damage caused by the conflict in the Middle East. In mid-April, the IMF announced that it expected at least a dozen countries to seek new loan programs to cope with surging energy prices and supply chain disruptions caused by the war.

== Governance and membership ==
IMF member states IMF member states not accepting the obligations of Article VIII, Sections 2, 3, and 4 Former IMF states/non-participants/no data available

Not all member countries of the IMF are sovereign states, and therefore not all "member countries" of the IMF are members of the United Nations. Amidst "member countries" of the IMF that are not member states of the UN are non-sovereign areas with special jurisdictions that are officially under the sovereignty of full UN member states, such as Aruba, Curaçao, Hong Kong, and Macao, as well as Kosovo. The corporate members appoint ex-officio voting members, who are listed below. All members of the IMF are also International Bank for Reconstruction and Development (IBRD) members and vice versa.

Former members are Cuba (which left in 1964), and Taiwan, which was ejected from the IMF in 1980 after losing the support of the then United States President Jimmy Carter and was replaced by the People's Republic of China. However, "Taiwan Province of China" is still listed in the official IMF indices. Poland withdrew in 1950—allegedly pressured by the Soviet Union—but returned in 1986. The former Czechoslovakia was expelled in 1954 for "failing to provide required data" and was readmitted in 1990, after the Velvet Revolution.

Apart from Cuba, the other UN states that do not belong to the IMF are Monaco and North Korea. Liechtenstein became the 191st member on 21 October 2024.

=== Qualifications ===
Any country may apply to be a part of the IMF. Post-IMF formation, in the early postwar period, rules for IMF membership were left relatively loose. Members needed to make periodic membership payments towards their quota, to refrain from currency restrictions unless granted IMF permission, to abide by the Code of Conduct in the IMF Articles of Agreement, and to provide national economic information. However, stricter rules were imposed on governments that applied to the IMF for funding.

The countries that joined the IMF between 1945 and 1971 agreed to keep their exchange rates secured at rates that could be adjusted only to correct a "fundamental disequilibrium" in the balance of payments, and only with the IMF's agreement.

=== Benefits ===
Member countries of the IMF have access to information on the economic policies of all member countries, the opportunity to influence other members' economic policies, technical assistance in banking, fiscal affairs, and exchange matters, financial support in times of payment difficulties, and increased opportunities for trade and investment.

=== Voting power ===
Voting power in the IMF is based on a quota system. Each member has a number of basic votes, equal to 5.502% of the total votes, plus one additional vote for each special drawing right (SDR) of 100,000 of a member country's quota. The SDR is the unit of account of the IMF and represents a potential claim to currency. When SDRs were created in 1969, they were each worth 0.888671 grams of gold, roughly the equivalent of one US dollar at the time. In 1973, following the termination of the Bretton Woods agreement in 1971, the IMF redefined the SDR as equivalent to the value of a specific selection of world currencies. The basic votes generate a slight bias in favour of small countries, but the additional votes determined by SDR outweigh this bias. Changes in the voting shares require approval by a super-majority of 85% of voting power.

Quota and voting shares for the largest IMF members
Rank	IMF Member country	Quota		Governor	Alternate	No. of votes	% of total votes
Rank	IMF Member country	millions of XDR	% of the total	Governor	Alternate	No. of votes	% of total votes
1	United States	82,994.2	17.42	Francis Brooke	Vacant	831,394	16.49
2	Japan	30,820.5	6.47	Satsuki Katayama	Kazuo Ueda	309,657	6.14
3	China	30,482.9	6.40	Gongsheng Pan	Changneng Xuan	306,281	6.08
4	Germany	26,634.4	5.59	Joachim Nagel	Lars Klingbeil	267,796	5.31
5	France	20,155.1	4.23	Roland Lescure	François Villeroy de Galhau	203,003	4.03
6	United Kingdom	20,155.1	4.23	John Healey	Andrew Bailey	203,003	4.03
7	Italy	15,070.0	3.16	Giancarlo Giorgetti	Fabio Panetta	152,152	3.02
8	India	13,114.4	2.75	Nirmala Sitharaman	Sanjay Malhotra	132,596	2.63
9	Russia	12,903.7	2.71	Anton Siluanov	Elvira S. Nabiullina	130,489	2.59
10	Brazil	11,042.0	2.32	Dario Durigan	Gabriel Muricca Galípolo	111,872	2.22
11	Canada	11,023.9	2.31	Francois-Philippe Champagne	Tiff Macklem	111,691	2.22
12	Saudi Arabia	9,992.6	2.10	Mohammed Aljadaan	Ayman Alsayari	101,378	2.01
13	Spain	9,535.5	2.00	Carlos Cuerpo	José Luis Escrivá	96,807	1.92
14	Mexico	8,912.7	1.87	Edgar Amador Zamora	Victoria Rodríguez Ceja	90,579	1.80
15	Netherlands	8,736.5	1.83	Olaf Sleijpen	Jasper Wesseling	88,817	1.76
16	South Korea	8,582.7	1.80	Yun-cheol Koo	Chang Yong Rhee	87,279	1.73
17	Australia	6,572.4	1.38	Jim Chalmers	Jenny Wilkinson	67,176	1.33
18	Belgium	6,410.7	1.35	Pierre Wunsch	Jan Jambon	65,559	1.30
19	Switzerland	5,771.1	1.21	Martin Reto Schlegel	Karin Keller-Sutter	59,163	1.17
20	Turkey	4,658.6	0.98	Mehmet Şimşek	Fatih Karahan	48,038	0.95
21	Indonesia	4,648.4	0.98	Destry Damayanti	Purbaya Yudhi Sadewa	47,936	0.95
22	Sweden	4,430.0	0.93	Erik Thedéen	Johanna Lybeck Lilja	45,752	0.91
23	Poland	4,095.4	0.86	Andrzej Domański	Marta Kightley	42,406	0.84
24	Austria	3,932.0	0.83	Martin Kocher	Edeltraud Stiftinger	40,772	0.81
25	Singapore	3,891.9	0.82	Kim Yong Gan	Der Jiun Chia	40,371	0.80

In December 2015, the United States Congress adopted a legislation authorising the 2010 Quota and Governance Reforms. As a result,

- all 190 members' quotas will increase from a total of about XDR 238.5 billion to about XDR 477 billion, while the quota shares and voting power of the IMF's poorest member countries will be protected.
- more than 6% of quota shares will shift to dynamic emerging market and developing countries and also from over-represented to under-represented members.
- four emerging market countries (Brazil, China, India, and Russia) will be among the ten largest members of the IMF. Other top 10 members are the United States, Japan, Germany, France, the United Kingdom and Italy.

==== Effects of the quota system ====
The IMF's quota system was created to raise funds for loans. Each IMF member country is assigned a quota, or contribution, that reflects the country's relative size in the global economy. Each member's quota also determines its relative voting power. Thus, financial contributions from member governments are linked to voting power in the organization.

This system follows the logic of a shareholder-controlled organization: wealthy countries have more say in the making and revision of rules. Since decision making at the IMF reflects each member's relative economic position in the world, wealthier countries that provide more money to the IMF have more influence than poorer members that contribute less; nonetheless, the IMF focuses on redistribution.

==== Inflexibility of voting power ====
Quotas are normally reviewed every five years and can be increased when deemed necessary by the board of governors. IMF voting shares are relatively inflexible: countries that grow economically have tended to become under-represented as their voting power lags behind. Currently, reforming the representation of developing countries within the IMF has been suggested. These countries' economies represent a large portion of the global economic system but this is not reflected in the IMF's decision-making process through the nature of the quota system. Joseph Stiglitz argues, "There is a need to provide more effective voice and representation for developing countries, which now represent a much larger portion of world economic activity since 1944, when the IMF was created." In 2008, a number of quota reforms were passed including shifting 6% of quota shares to dynamic emerging markets and developing countries.

==== Overcoming the borrower/creditor divide ====
The IMF's membership is divided along income lines: certain countries provide financial resources while others use these resources. Both developed country "creditors" and developing country "borrowers" are members of the IMF. The developed countries provide the financial resources but rarely enter into IMF loan agreements; they are the creditors. Conversely, the developing countries use the lending services but contribute little to the pool of money available to lend because their quotas are smaller; they are the borrowers. Thus, tension is created around governance issues because these two groups, creditors and borrowers, have fundamentally different interests, and low-income "borrowing" members lack meaningful representation in IMF decision-making.

The criticism is that the system of voting power distribution through a quota system institutionalizes borrower subordination and creditor dominance. The resulting division of the IMF's membership into borrowers and non-borrowers has increased the controversy around conditionality because the borrowers are interested in increasing loan access while creditors want to maintain reassurance that the loans will be repaid.

== Operations ==
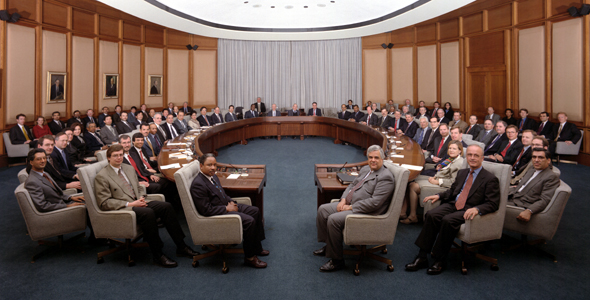
Board of Governors International Monetary Fund (1999)

According to the IMF itself, it works to foster global growth and economic stability by providing policy advice and financing to its members. It also works with developing countries to help them achieve macroeconomic stability and reduce poverty. The rationale for this is that private international capital markets function imperfectly and many countries have limited access to financial markets. Such market imperfections, together with balance-of-payments financing, provide the justification for official financing, without which many countries could only correct large external payment imbalances through measures with adverse economic consequences. The IMF provides alternate sources of financing such as the Poverty Reduction and Growth Facility.

Upon the founding of the IMF, its three primary functions were:

- to oversee the fixed exchange rate arrangements between countries, thus helping national governments manage their exchange rates and allowing these governments to prioritize economic growth, and
- to provide short-term capital to aid the balance of payments and prevent the spread of international financial crisis.
- to help mend the pieces of the international economy after the Great Depression and World War II as well as to provide capital investments for economic growth and projects such as infrastructure.

The IMF's role was fundamentally altered by the floating exchange rates after 1971. It shifted to examining the economic policies of countries with IMF loan agreements to determine whether a shortage of capital was due to economic fluctuations or economic policy. The IMF also researched what types of government policy would ensure economic recovery. A particular concern of the IMF was to prevent financial crises, such as those in Mexico in 1982, Brazil in 1987, the 1997 Asian financial crisis, and the 1998 Russian financial crisis, from spreading and threatening the entire global financial and currency system. The challenge was to promote and implement a policy that reduced the frequency of crises among emerging market countries, especially the middle-income countries which are vulnerable to massive capital outflows. Rather than maintaining a position of oversight of only exchange rates, their function became one of surveillance of the overall macroeconomic performance of member countries, as well as advising on economic policies.

In addition, the IMF negotiates conditions on lending and loans under their policy of conditionality, which was established in the 1950s. Low-income countries can borrow on concessional terms, which means there is a period of time with no interest rates, through the Extended Credit Facility (ECF), the Standby Credit Facility (SCF) and the Rapid Credit Facility (RCF). Non-concessional loans, which include interest rates, are provided mainly through the Stand-By Arrangements (SBA), the Flexible Credit Line (FCL), the Precautionary and Liquidity Line (PLL), and the Extended Fund Facility. The IMF provides emergency assistance via the Rapid Financing Instrument (RFI) to members facing urgent balance-of-payments needs.

=== Surveillance of the global economy ===
The IMF is mandated to oversee the international monetary and financial system and monitor the economic and financial policies of its member countries. Accurate estimations require a degree of participatory surveillance. Market sizes and economic facts are estimated using member-state data, shared and verifiable by the organization's other member-states. This transparency is intended to facilitate international co-operation and trade. Since the demise of the Bretton Woods system of fixed exchange rates in the early 1970s, surveillance has evolved largely by way of changes in procedures rather than through the adoption of new obligations.

The Fund typically analyses the appropriateness of each member country's economic and financial policies for achieving orderly economic growth, and assesses the consequences of these policies for other countries and for the global economy. For instance, The IMF played a significant role in individual countries, such as Armenia and Belarus, in providing financial support to achieve stabilization financing from 2009 to 2019. The maximum sustainable debt level of a polity, which is watched closely by the IMF, was defined in 2011 by IMF economists to be 120%. Indeed, it was at this number that the Greek government-debt crisis started in 2010.

IMF Data Dissemination Systems participants: IMF member using SDDS IMF member using GDDS IMF member, not using any of the DDSystems non-IMF entity using SDDS non-IMF entity using GDDS no interaction with the IMF

In 1995, the International Monetary Fund began to work on data dissemination standards with the view of guiding IMF member countries to disseminate their economic and financial data to the public. The International Monetary and Financial Committee (IMFC) endorsed the guidelines for the dissemination standards and they were split into two tiers: The General Data Dissemination System (GDDS) and the Special Data Dissemination Standard (SDDS).

The executive board approved the SDDS and GDDS in 1996 and 1997, respectively, and subsequent amendments were published in a revised Guide to the General Data Dissemination System. The system is aimed primarily at statisticians and aims to improve many aspects of statistical systems in a country. It is also part of the World Bank Millennium Development Goals (MDG) and Poverty Reduction Strategic Papers (PRSPs).

The primary objective of the GDDS is to encourage member countries to build a framework to improve data quality and statistical capacity building to evaluate statistical needs, set priorities in improving timeliness, transparency, reliability, and accessibility of financial and economic data. Some countries initially used the GDDS, but later upgraded to SDDS.

Some entities that are not IMF members also contribute statistical data to the systems:

- Palestinian Authority – GDDS
- Hong Kong – SDDS
- Macau – GDDS
- Institutions of the European Union:
  - The European Central Bank for the Eurozone – SDDS
  - Eurostat for the whole EU – SDDS, thus providing data from Cyprus (not using any DDSystem on its own) and Malta (using only GDDS on its own).

A 2021 study found that the IMF's surveillance activities have "a substantial impact on sovereign debt with much greater impacts in emerging than high-income economies".

=== Conditionality of loans ===
IMF conditionality is a set of policies or conditions that the IMF requires in exchange for financial resources. The IMF does require collateral from countries for loans but also requires the government seeking assistance to correct its macroeconomic imbalances in the form of policy reform. If the conditions are not met, the funds are withheld. The concept of conditionality was introduced in a 1952 Executive Board decision and later incorporated into the Articles of Agreement.

Conditionality is associated with economic theory as well as an enforcement mechanism for repayment. Stemming primarily from the work of Jacques Polak, the theoretical underpinning of conditionality was the "monetary approach to the balance of payments".

==== Structural adjustment ====
Some of the conditions for structural adjustment can include:

- Cutting expenditures or raising revenues, also known as austerity.
- Focusing economic output on direct export and resource extraction,
- Devaluation of currencies,
- Trade liberalisation, or lifting import and export restrictions,
- Increasing the stability of investment (by supplementing foreign direct investment with the opening of facilities for the domestic market),
- Balancing budgets and not overspending,
- Removing price controls and state subsidies,
- Privatization, or divestiture of all or part of state-owned enterprises,
- Enhancing the rights of foreign investors vis-a-vis national laws,
- Improving governance and fighting corruption,

These conditions are known as the Washington Consensus.

==== Benefits ====
These loan conditions ensure that the borrowing country will be able to repay the IMF and that the country will not attempt to solve their balance-of-payment problems in a way that would negatively impact the international economy. The incentive problem of moral hazard—when economic agents maximise their own utility to the detriment of others because they do not bear the full consequences of their actions—is mitigated through conditions rather than providing collateral; countries in need of IMF loans do not generally possess internationally valuable collateral anyway.

Conditionality also reassures the IMF that the funds lent to them will be used for the purposes defined by the Articles of Agreement and provides safeguards that the country will be able to rectify its macroeconomic and structural imbalances. In the judgment of the IMF, the adoption by the member of certain corrective measures or policies will allow it to repay the IMF, thereby ensuring that the resources will be available to support other members.

As of 2004, borrowing countries have had a good track record for repaying credit extended under the IMF's regular lending facilities with full interest over the duration of the loan. This indicates that IMF lending does not impose a burden on creditor countries, as lending countries receive market-rate interest on most of their quota subscription, plus any of their own-currency subscriptions that are loaned out by the IMF, plus all of the reserve assets that they provide the IMF.

=== Use ===
In 2008, the SAIS Review of International Affairs revealed that the average overall use of IMF credit per decade increased, in real terms, by 21% between the 1970s and 1980s, and increased again by just over 22% from the 1980s to the 1991–2005 period. Another study has suggested that since 1950 the continent of Africa alone has received $300 billion from the IMF, the World Bank, and affiliate institutions.

A study by Bumba Mukherjee found that developing democratic countries benefit more from IMF programs than developing autocratic countries because policy-making, and the process of deciding where loaned money is used, is more transparent within a democracy. One study done by Randall Stone found that although earlier studies found little impact of IMF programs on balance of payments, more recent studies using more sophisticated methods and larger samples "usually found IMF programs improved the balance of payments".

=== Exceptional Access Framework – sovereign debt ===
The Exceptional Access Framework was created in 2003 when John B. Taylor was Under Secretary of the US Treasury for International Affairs. The new Framework became fully operational in February 2003 and it was applied in the subsequent decisions on Argentina and Brazil. Its purpose was to place some sensible rules and limits on the way the IMF makes loans to support governments with debt problem—especially in emerging markets—and thereby move away from the bailout mentality of the 1990s. Such a reform was essential for ending the crisis atmosphere that then existed in emerging markets. The reform was closely related to and put in place nearly simultaneously with the actions of several emerging market countries to place collective action clauses in their bond contracts.

In 2010, the framework was abandoned so the IMF could make loans to Greece in an unsustainable and political situation.

The topic of sovereign debt restructuring was taken up by IMF staff in April 2013 for the first time since 2005, in a report entitled "Sovereign Debt Restructuring: Recent Developments and Implications for the Fund's Legal and Policy Framework". The paper, which was discussed by the board on 20 May, summarised the recent experiences in Greece, St Kitts and Nevis, Belize, and Jamaica. An explanatory interview with deputy director Hugh Bredenkamp was published a few days later, as was a deconstruction by Matina Stevis of The Wall Street Journal.

The staff was directed to formulate an updated policy, which was accomplished on 22 May 2014 with a report entitled "The Fund's Lending Framework and Sovereign Debt: Preliminary Considerations", and taken up by the executive board on 13 June. The staff proposed that "in circumstances where a (Sovereign) member has lost market access and debt is considered sustainable ... the IMF would be able to provide Exceptional Access on the basis of a debt operation that involves an extension of maturities", which was labeled a "reprofiling operation". These reprofiling operations would "generally be less costly to the debtor and creditors—and thus to the system overall—relative to either an upfront debt reduction operation or a bail-out that is followed by debt reduction ... (and) would be envisaged only when both (a) a member has lost market access and (b) debt is assessed to be sustainable, but not with high probability ... Creditors will only agree if they understand that such an amendment is necessary to avoid a worse outcome: namely, a default and/or an operation involving debt reduction ... Collective action clauses, which now exist in most—but not all—bonds would be relied upon to address collective action problems."

== Personnel ==
=== Board of Governors ===
The board of governors consists of one governor and one alternate governor for each member country. Each member country appoints its two governors. The Board normally meets once a year and is responsible for electing or appointing an executive director to the executive board. While the board of governors is officially responsible for approving quota increases, special drawing right allocations, the admittance of new members, compulsory withdrawal of members, and amendments to the Articles of Agreement and By-Laws, in practice it has delegated most of its powers to the IMF's executive board.

The board of governors is advised by the International Monetary and Financial Committee and the Development Committee. The International Monetary and Financial Committee has 24 members and monitors developments in global liquidity and the transfer of resources to developing countries. The Development Committee has 25 members and advises on critical development issues and on financial resources required to promote economic development in developing countries.

The board of governors reports directly to the managing director of the IMF, Kristalina Georgieva.

=== Executive Board ===
25 Executive Directors make up the executive board. The executive directors represent all 191 member countries in a geographically based roster. Countries with large economies have their own executive director, but most countries are grouped in constituencies representing four or more countries.

Following the 2008 Amendment on Voice and Participation which came into effect in March 2011, seven countries each appoint an executive director: the United States, Japan, China, Germany, France, the United Kingdom, and Saudi Arabia. The remaining 18 Directors represent constituencies consisting of 2 to 23 countries. This Board usually meets several times each week. The board membership and constituency is scheduled for periodic review every eight years.

List of Executive Directors of the IMF, as of August 2025

Country	Region	Number of Member(s) Represented	Director	Country with Most Votes
United States	United States	1	Shannon Shuang Ding	United States
Japan	Japan	1	Jun Mizuguchi	Japan
China	China	1	Zhengxin Zhang	China
Belgium	Benelux, BSEC+CEFTA (except Albania, Azerbaijan, Greece, Kosovo, Russia, Serbia and Turkey), Andorra, Croatia, Cyprus and Israel	16	Jeroen Eddy Ellen Clicq	Netherlands
Germany	Germany	1	Bernd Kaltenhauser	Germany
Spain	SICA (except Belize, Dominican Republic, Nicaragua and Panama), Colombia, Mexico and Spain	7	Xiana Margarida Méndez Bértolo	Spain
Malaysia	ASEAN (except Myanmar (voting power suspended) and Timor-Leste), Fiji, Nepal and Tonga	12	Idwan Suhardi Bin Hakim	Indonesia
Italy	Albania, Greece, Italy, Malta, Portugal and San Marino	6	Riccardo Ercoli	Italy
France	France	1	Arnaud Fernand Buisse	France
United Kingdom	United Kingdom	1	Veda Poon	United Kingdom
South Korea	PIF (except Fiji, Tonga, and non-IMF members Cook Islands and Niue), Mongolia, Seychelles and South Korea	15	Mark Blackmore and Nghi Luu (alternates)	South Korea
Canada	CARICOM (except Guyana, Haiti, Suriname and Trinidad and Tobago), Canada and Ireland	12	Georgina Fitzgerald (alternate)	Canada
Lithuania	Baltic and Nordic	8	Vitas Vasiliauskas	Sweden
Turkey	Visegrád (except Poland), Austria, Belarus, Kosovo, Slovenia and Turkey	8	Yigit Korkmaz Yasar	Turkey
Brazil	Other CARICOM members, other SICA members (except Belize), Brazil, Cape Verde, Ecuador and Timor-Leste	11	Andre Roncaglia de Carvalho	Brazil
India	non-ASEAN BIMSTEC (except Nepal)	4	Urjit R. Patel	India
Poland	ECO (except Afghanistan (voting power suspended), Iran, Pakistan and Turkey), non-Nordic EFTA, Poland and Serbia	10	Patryk Loszewski	Switzerland
Russia	Russia and Syria	2	Ksenia Yudaeva	Russia
Egypt	non-Maghreb Arab League (except Djibouti, Saudi Arabia, Sudan and Syria, and non-IMF member Palestine) and Maldives	12	Mohamed Ahmed Mohamed Maait	United Arab Emirates
Pakistan	Maghreb Union (except Mauritania), Ghana, Iran and Pakistan	7	Bahador Bijani	Iran
Saudi Arabia	Saudi Arabia	1	Mohamed Ahmed A Alrashed	Saudi Arabia
Madagascar	SADC (except DR Congo and Seychelles) and Comoros	14	Adriano Ubisse	South Africa
Argentina	Andean Community (except Colombia and Ecuador), Mercosur (except Brazil) and Chile	6	Leonardo Madcur	Argentina
Ivory Coast	ECOWAS (except Cape Verde and Ghana) and Mauritania	14	Ouattara Wautabouna	Nigeria
Congo, Republic of	EAC+ECCAS+IGAD (except Angola, Somalia and Tanzania)	17	Regis Olivier N'Sonde	Congo, DR

=== Managing Director ===
The IMF is led by a managing director, who is head of the staff and serves as chairman of the executive board. The managing director is the most powerful position at the IMF. Historically, the IMF's managing director has been a European while the president of the World Bank has been an American. However, this standard is increasingly being questioned and competition for these two posts may soon open up to include other qualified candidates from any part of the world. In August 2019, the International Monetary Fund has removed the age limit which is 65 or over for its managing director position.

In 2011, the world's largest developing countries, the BRICS states, issued a statement declaring that the tradition of appointing a European as managing director undermined the legitimacy of the IMF and called for the appointment to be merit-based.

==== List of Managing Directors ====
Term	Dates	Name	Citizenship	Background
1	6 May 1946 – 5 May 1951	Camille Gutt	Belgium	Politician, Economist, Lawyer, Economics Minister, Finance Minister
2	3 August 1951 – 3 October 1956	Ivar Rooth	Sweden	Economist, Lawyer, Central Banker
3	21 November 1956 – 5 May 1963	Per Jacobsson	Sweden	Economist, Lawyer, Academic, League of Nations, BIS
4	1 September 1963 – 31 August 1973	Pierre-Paul Schweitzer	France	Lawyer, Businessman, Civil Servant, Central Banker
5	1 September 1973 – 18 June 1978	Johan Witteveen	Netherlands	Politician, Economist, Academic, Finance Minister, Deputy Prime Minister, CPB
6	18 June 1978 – 15 January 1987	Jacques de Larosière	France	Businessman, Civil Servant, Central Banker
7	16 January 1987 – 14 February 2000	Michel Camdessus	France	Economist, Civil Servant, Central Banker
8	1 May 2000 – 4 March 2004	Horst Köhler	Germany	Politician, Economist, Civil Servant, EBRD, President
9	7 June 2004 – 31 October 2007	Rodrigo Rato	Spain	Politician, Businessman, Economics Minister, Finance Minister, Deputy Prime Minister
10	1 November 2007 – 18 May 2011	Dominique Strauss-Kahn	France	Politician, Economist, Lawyer, Businessman, Economics Minister, Finance Minister
11	5 July 2011 – 12 September 2019	Christine Lagarde	France	Politician, Lawyer, Economics Minister, Finance Minister
12	1 October 2019 – present	Kristalina Georgieva	Bulgaria	Politician, Economist, European Commissioner

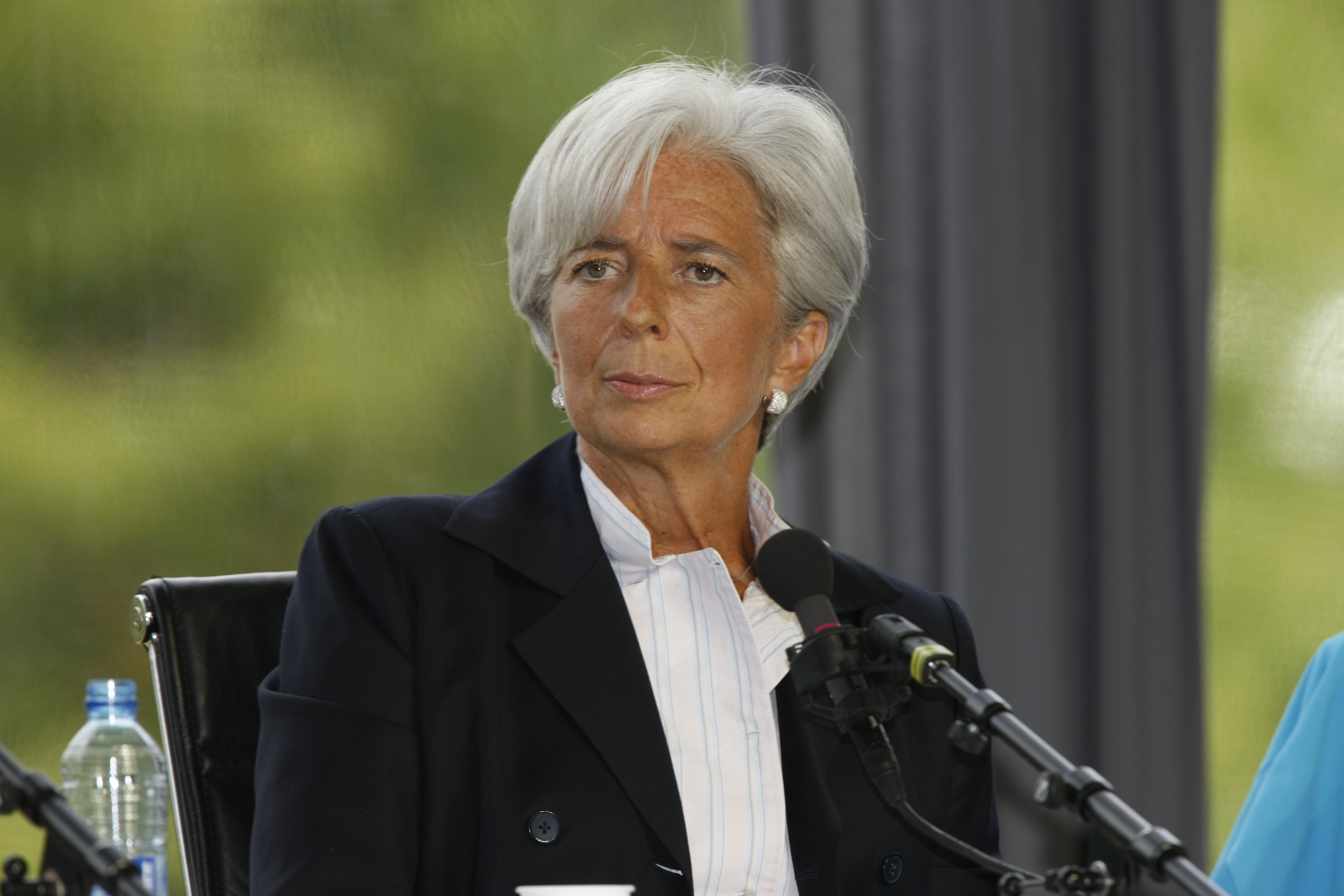
On 28 June 2011, Christine Lagarde was named managing director of the IMF, replacing Dominique Strauss-Kahn.

Former managing director Dominique Strauss-Kahn was arrested in connection with charges of sexually assaulting a New York hotel room attendant and resigned on 18 May. The charges were later dropped. On 28 June 2011 Christine Lagarde was confirmed as managing director of the IMF for a five-year term starting on 5 July 2011. She was re-elected by consensus for a second five-year term, starting 5 July 2016, being the only candidate nominated for the post of managing director.

=== First Deputy Managing Director ===
The managing director is assisted by a First Deputy managing director (FDMD) who, by convention, has always been a citizen of the United States. Together, the managing director and their First Deputy lead the senior management of the IMF. Like the managing director, the First Deputy traditionally serves a five-year term.

==== List of First Deputy Managing Directors ====
No.	Dates	Name	Citizenship	Background
1	9 February 1949 – 24 January 1952	Andrew Overby	United States	Banker, Senior U.S. Treasury Official
2	16 March 1953 – 31 October 1962	Merle Cochran	United States	U.S. Foreign Service Officer
3	1 November 1962 – 28 February 1974	Frank Southard	United States	Economist, Civil Servant
4	1 March 1974 – 31 May 1984	William Dale	United States	Civil Servant
5	1 June 1984 – 31 August 1994	Richard Erb	United States	Economist, White House Official
6	1 September 1994 – 31 August 2001	Stanley Fischer	Israel; United States	Economist, Central Banker, Banker
7	1 September 2001 – 31 August 2006	Anne Kreuger	United States	Economist
8	17 July 2006 – 11 November 2011	John Lipsky	United States	Economist
9	1 September 2011 – 28 February 2020	David Lipton	United States	Economist, Senior U.S. Treasury Official
10	20 March 2020 – 20 January 2022	Geoffrey Okamoto	United States	Senior U.S. Treasury Official, Bank Consultant
11	21 January 2022 – 31 August 2025	Gita Gopinath	United States	Professor at Harvard University's Economics department Chief Economist of IMF
12	6 October 2025 – present	Dan Katz	United States	Senior U.S. Treasury Official, Banker

=== Chief Economist ===
The chief economist leads the research division of the IMF and is a "senior official" of the IMF.

==== List of Chief Economists ====
Term	Dates	Name	Citizenship
1	1946–1958	Edward Bernstein	United States
2	1958–1980	Jacques Polak	Netherlands
3	1980–1987	William Hood	Canada
4	1987–1991	Jacob Frenkel	Israel
5	August 1991 – 29 June 2001	Michael Mussa	United States
6	August 2001 – September 2003	Kenneth Rogoff	United States
7	September 2003 – January 2007	Raghuram Rajan	India
8	March 2007 – 31 August 2008	Simon Johnson	United Kingdom; United States
9	1 September 2008 – 8 September 2015	Olivier Blanchard	France
10	8 September 2015 – 31 December 2018	Maurice Obstfeld	United States
11	1 January 2019 – 21 January 2022	Gita Gopinath	United States
12	24 January 2022 – 1 July 2026	Pierre-Olivier Gourinchas	France
13	10 August 2026 – present	Silvana Tenreyro	Argentina United Kingdom

=== IMF staff ===
IMF staff have considerable autonomy and are known to shape IMF policy. According to Jeffrey Chwieroth, "It is the staff members who conduct the bulk of the IMF's tasks; they formulate policy proposals for consideration by member states, exercise surveillance, carry out loan negotiations and design the programs, and collect and systematize detailed information." Most IMF staff are economists. According to a 1968 study, nearly 60% of staff were from English-speaking developed countries. By 2004, between 40 and 50% of staff were from English-speaking developed countries.

A 1996 study found that 90% of new staff with a PhD obtained them from universities in the United States or Canada. A 1999 study found that none of the new staff with a PhD obtained their PhD in the Global South.

== Assessment ==
=== Impact ===
According to a 2002 study by Randall W. Stone, the academic literature on the IMF shows "no consensus on the long-term effects of IMF programs on growth".

Some research has found that IMF loans can reduce the chance of a future banking crisis, while other studies have found that they can increase the risk of political crises. IMF programs can reduce the effects of a currency crisis.

Some research has found that IMF programs are less effective in countries which possess a developed-country patron (be it by foreign aid, membership of postcolonial institutions or UN voting patterns), seemingly due to this patron allowing countries to flout IMF program rules as these rules are not consistently enforced. Some research has found that IMF loans reduce economic growth due to creating an economic moral hazard, reducing public investment, reducing incentives to create a robust domestic policies and reducing private investor confidence. Other research has indicated that IMF loans can have a positive impact on economic growth and that their effects are highly nuanced.

=== IMF and globalization ===
Globalization encompasses three institutions: global financial markets and transnational companies, national governments linked to each other in economic and military alliances led by the United States, and rising "global governments" such as World Trade Organization (WTO), IMF, and World Bank. Charles Derber argues in his book People Before Profit, "These interacting institutions create a new global power system where sovereignty is globalized, taking power and constitutional authority away from nations and giving it to global markets and international bodies".

=== International central bank digital currency ===
In April 2023, the IMF launched their international central bank digital currency through their Digital Currency Monetary Authority, it will be called the Universal Monetary Unit, or Units for shorthand. The ANSI character will be Ü and will be used to facilitate international banking and international trade between countries and currencies. It will help facilitate SWIFT transactions on cross border transactions at wholesale FX rates instantaneously with real-time settlements. In June, it announced it was working on a platform for central bank digital currencies (CBDCs) that would enable transactions between nations. IMF Managing Director Kristalina Georgieva said that if central banks did not agree on a common platform, cryptocurrency would fill the resulting vacuum.

== Criticisms and controversy ==
=== General ===
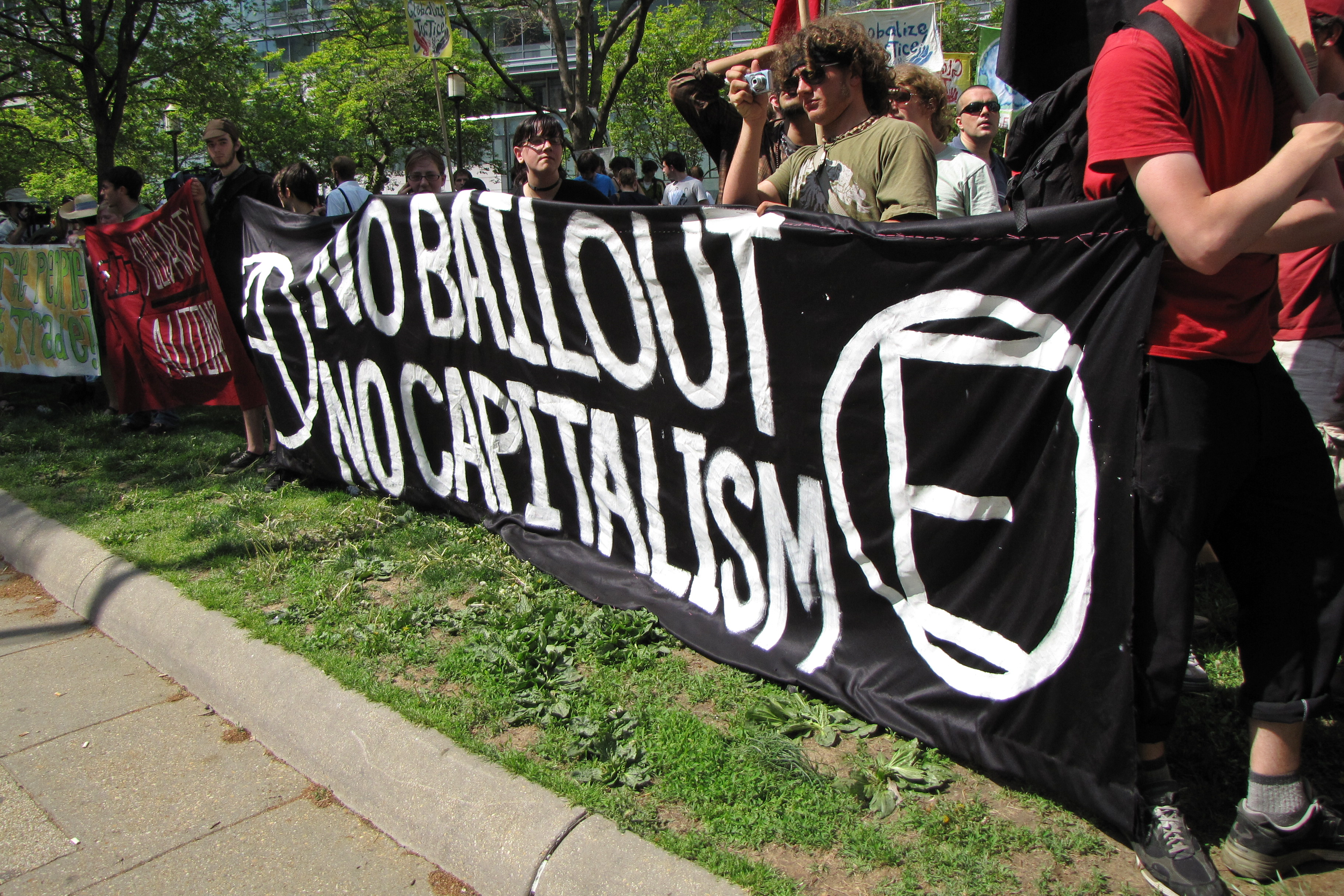
Anarchist protest against the IMF and corporate bailout in April 2009

Overseas Development Institute (ODI) research undertaken in 1980 included criticisms of the IMF which support the analysis that it is a pillar of what activist Titus Alexander calls global apartheid.

- Developed countries were seen to have a more dominant role and control over less developed countries (LDCs).
- The Fund worked on the incorrect assumption that all payments disequilibria were caused domestically. The Group of 24 (G-24), on behalf of LDC members and the United Nations Conference on Trade and Development (UNCTAD) complained that the IMF did not distinguish sufficiently between disequilibria with predominantly external as opposed to internal causes. This criticism was voiced in the aftermath of the 1973 oil crisis. Then LDCs found themselves with payment deficits due to adverse changes in their terms of trade, with the Fund prescribing stabilization programmes similar to those suggested for deficits caused by government over-spending. Faced with long-term, externally generated disequilibria, the G-24 argued for more time for LDCs to adjust their economies.
- Some IMF policies may be anti-developmental; the report said that deflationary effects of IMF programmes quickly led to losses of output and employment in economies where incomes were low and unemployment was high. Moreover, the burden of the deflation is disproportionately borne by the poor.
- The IMF's initial policies were based in theory and influenced by differing opinions and departmental rivalries. Critics suggest that its intentions to implement these policies in countries with widely varying economic circumstances were misinformed and lacked economic rationale.

ODI conclusions were that the IMF's very nature of promoting market-oriented approaches attracted unavoidable criticism. On the other hand, the IMF could serve as a scapegoat while allowing governments to blame international bankers. The ODI conceded that the IMF was insensitive to political aspirations of LDCs while its policy conditions were inflexible.

Argentina, which had been considered by the IMF to be a model country in its compliance to policy proposals by the Bretton Woods institutions, experienced a catastrophic economic crisis in 2001, which some believe to have been caused by IMF-induced budget restrictions—which undercut the government's ability to sustain national infrastructure even in crucial areas such as health, education, and security—and privatisation of strategically vital national resources. Others attribute the crisis to Argentina's misdesigned fiscal federalism, which caused subnational spending to increase rapidly. The crisis added to widespread hatred of this institution in Argentina and other South American countries, with many blaming the IMF for the region's economic problems. The post-2000s trend toward moderate left-wing governments in the region and a growing concern with the development of a regional economic policy largely independent of big business pressures has been ascribed to this crisis.

In 2001, the Independent Evaluation Office, an autonomous body, was established to conduct independent evaluations of policies and activities of the International Monetary Fund.

In 2006, a senior ActionAid policy analyst Akanksha Marphatia stated that IMF policies in Africa undermine any possibility of meeting the Millennium Development Goals (MDGs) due to imposed restrictions that prevent spending on important sectors, such as education and health.

In an interview (2008-05-19), the former Romanian Prime Minister Călin Popescu-Tăriceanu claimed that "Since 2005, IMF is constantly making mistakes when it appreciates the country's economic performances". Former Tanzanian President Julius Nyerere, who claimed that debt-ridden African states were ceding sovereignty to the IMF and the World Bank, famously asked, "Who elected the IMF to be the ministry of finance for every country in the world?"

Former chief economist of IMF and former Reserve Bank of India (RBI) Governor Raghuram Rajan who predicted the 2008 financial crisis criticised the IMF for remaining a sideline player to the developed world. He criticised the IMF for praising the monetary policies of the US, which he believed were wreaking havoc in emerging markets. He had been critical of "ultra-loose money policies" of some unnamed countries.

Countries such as Zambia have not received proper aid with long-lasting effects, leading to concern from economists. Since 2005, Zambia (as well as 29 other African countries) did receive debt write-offs, which helped with the country's medical and education funds. However, Zambia returned to a debt of over half its GDP in less than a decade. American economist William Easterly, sceptical of the IMF's methods, had initially warned that "debt relief would simply encourage more reckless borrowing by crooked governments unless it was accompanied by reforms to speed up economic growth and improve governance", according to The Economist.

Feminist and postcolonial scholars have critiqued the IMF's structural adjustment and austerity programs for reinforcing neocolonial economic dependencies in postcolonial states. These policy conditions often reduce public spending on health, education, and social services, disproportionately affecting women and marginalized communities, while prioritizing debt repayment and market liberalization over social welfare and national economic sovereignty.

=== Conditionality ===
The IMF has been criticised for being "out of touch" with local economic conditions, cultures, and environments in the countries they are requiring policy reform. The economic advice the IMF gives might not always take into consideration the difference between what spending means on paper and how it is felt by citizens. Countries charge that with excessive conditionality, they do not "own" the programmes and the links are broken between a recipient country's people, its government, and the goals being pursued by the IMF.

Jeffrey Sachs argues that the IMF's "usual prescription is 'budgetary belt tightening to countries who are much too poor to own belts'". Sachs wrote that the IMF's role as a generalist institution specialising in macroeconomic issues needs reform. Conditionality has also been criticised because a country can pledge collateral of "acceptable assets" to obtain waivers—if one assumes that all countries are able to provide "acceptable collateral".

One view is that conditionality undermines domestic political institutions. The recipient governments are sacrificing policy autonomy in exchange for funds, which can lead to public resentment of the local leadership for accepting and enforcing the IMF conditions. Political instability can result from more leadership turnover as political leaders are replaced in electoral backlashes. IMF conditions are often criticised for reducing government services, thus increasing unemployment.

Another criticism is that IMF policies are only designed to address poor governance, excessive government spending, excessive government intervention in markets, and too much state ownership. This assumes that this narrow range of issues represents the only possible problems; everything is standardised and differing contexts are ignored. A country may also be compelled to accept conditions it would not normally accept had they not been in a financial crisis in need of assistance.

On top of that, regardless of what methodologies and data sets used, it comes to same the conclusion of exacerbating income inequality. With Gini coefficient, it became clear that countries with IMF policies face increased income inequality.

It is claimed that conditionalities hinder social stability and hence inhibit the stated goals of the IMF, while Structural Adjustment Programmes lead to an increase in poverty in recipient countries. The IMF sometimes advocates "austerity programmes", cutting public spending and increasing taxes even when the economy is weak, to bring budgets closer to a balance, thus reducing budget deficits. Countries are often advised to lower their corporate tax rate. In Globalization and Its Discontents, Joseph E. Stiglitz, former chief economist and senior vice-president at the World Bank, criticises these policies. He argues that by converting to a more monetarist approach, the purpose of the fund is no longer valid, as it was designed to provide funds for countries to carry out Keynesian reflations, and that the IMF "was not participating in a conspiracy, but it was reflecting the interests and ideology of the Western financial community".

Stiglitz concludes, "Modern high-tech warfare is designed to remove physical contact: dropping bombs from 50,000 feet ensures that one does not 'feel' what one does. Modern economic management is similar: from one's luxury hotel, one can callously impose policies about which one would think twice if one knew the people whose lives one was destroying."

The researchers Eric Toussaint and Damien Millet argue that the IMF's policies amount to a new form of colonisation that does not need a military presence:

Following the exigencies of the governments of the richest companies, the IMF, permitted countries in crisis to borrow in order to avoid default on their repayments. Caught in the debt's downward spiral, developing countries soon had no other recourse than to take on new debt in order to repay the old debt. Before providing them with new loans, at higher interest rates, future leaders asked the IMF, to intervene with the guarantee of ulterior reimbursement, asking for a signed agreement with the said countries. The IMF thus agreed to restart the flow of the 'finance pump' on condition that the concerned countries first use this money to reimburse banks and other private lenders, while restructuring their economy at the IMF's discretion: these were the famous conditionalities, detailed in the Structural Adjustment Programmes. The IMF and its ultra-liberal experts took control of the borrowing countries' economic policies. A new form of colonisation was thus instituted. It was not even necessary to establish an administrative or military presence; the debt alone maintained this new form of submission.

International politics play an important role in IMF decision making. The clout of member states is roughly proportional to its contribution to IMF finances. The United States has the greatest number of votes and therefore wields the most influence. Domestic politics often come into play, with politicians in developing countries using conditionality to gain leverage over the opposition to influence policy.

Academic Jeremy Garlick cites IMF loans to South Korea during the 1997 Asian financial crisis as widely perceived by the South Korean public as a debt-trap. Garlick writes that the public was generally bitter about submitting to the conditions imposed by the IMF, which required South Korea to radically restructure its economy and consult with the IMF before making economic decisions until the debt was repaid.

In 2016, the IMF's research department published a report titled "Neoliberalism: Oversold?" which, while praising some aspects of the "neoliberal agenda", claims that the organisation has been "overselling" fiscal austerity policies and financial deregulation, which they claim has exacerbated both financial crises and economic inequality around the world.

In 2020 and 2021, Oxfam criticized the IMF for forcing tough austerity measures on many low income countries during the COVID-19 pandemic, despite forcing cuts to healthcare spending, would hamper the recipient's response to the pandemic.

=== Support of dictatorships ===
The role of the Bretton Woods institutions has been controversial since the late Cold War, because of claims that the IMF policy makers supported military dictatorships friendly to American and European corporations, but also other anti-communist and communist regimes, such as the Socialist Republic of Romania. An example of IMF's support for a dictatorship was its ongoing support for Mobutu's rule in Zaire, although its own envoy Erwin Blumenthal provided a sobering report about the entrenched corruption and embezzlement and the inability of the country to pay back any loans. In 2021, the IMF approved a US$1 billion loan to the autocratic Uganda despite protests from Ugandans in Washington, London and South Africa. Critics also claim that the IMF is generally apathetic or hostile to democracy, human rights, and labour rights. The controversy has helped spark the anti-globalization movement.

Arguments in favour of the IMF supporting dictatorships is the claim that economic stability is a precursor to democracy. A 2017 study found no evidence of IMF lending programs undermining democracy in borrowing countries, it found "evidence for modest but definitively positive conditional differences in the democracy scores of participating and non-participating countries".

A 2020 study found the reverse causality with democracy as a precursor to economic stability. Critics highlight various examples in which democratised countries fell after receiving IMF loans.

Party-based autocracies and democracies can face similar incentives when considering agreements with IMF, in contrast to personalist and military regimes.

=== Impact on access to food ===
A number of civil society organisations have criticised the IMF's policies for their impact on access to food, particularly in developing countries. In October 2008, former United States president Bill Clinton delivered a speech to the United Nations on World Food Day, criticising the World Bank and IMF for their policies on food and agriculture:

We need the World Bank, the IMF, all the big foundations, and all the governments to admit that, for 30 years, we all blew it, including me when I was president. We were wrong to believe that food was like some other product in international trade, and we all have to go back to a more responsible and sustainable form of agriculture.

— Former U.S. president Bill Clinton, Speech at United Nations World Food Day, October 16, 2008

The FPIF remarked that there is a recurring pattern: "the destabilization of peasant producers by a one-two punch of IMF-World Bank structural adjustment programs that gutted government investment in the countryside followed by the massive influx of subsidized U.S. and European Union agricultural imports after the WTO's Agreement on Agriculture pried open markets".

=== Impact on public health ===
The structural adjustments programs (SAPs) demanded by IMF conditionality contribute to the weakening of public health services in a number of ways. Cuts in funding to public health services prompted by IMF SAPs contribute to poorer working conditions in the sector, causing repercussions for health service quality and availability. This has been shown to negatively impact vaccination rates, increase exposure to conditions with risk-factors like disability and death, and higher prevalence of tuberculosis.

A 2009 study concluded that the strict conditions resulted in thousands of deaths in Eastern Europe by tuberculosis as public health care had to be weakened. In the 21 countries to which the IMF had given loans, tuberculosis deaths rose by 16.6%. A 2017 systematic review on studies conducted on the impact that structural adjustment programs have on child and maternal health found that these programs have a detrimental effect on maternal and child health among other adverse effects.

Structural adjustment programs are considered a form of neo-colonialism by some academics due to their intensification of healthcare access inequality, and their promotion of external intervention and aid to meet health needs in developing countries.

=== Scandals ===
Managing Director Lagarde (2011–2019) was convicted of giving preferential treatment to businessman-turned-politician Bernard Tapie as he pursued a legal challenge against the French government. At the time, Lagarde was the French economic minister. Within hours of her conviction, in which she escaped any punishment, the fund's 24-member executive board put to rest any speculation that she might have to resign, praising her "outstanding leadership" and the "wide respect" she commands around the world.

Former IMF Managing Director Rodrigo Rato was arrested in 2015 for alleged fraud, embezzlement and money laundering. In 2017, the Audiencia Nacional found Rato guilty of embezzlement and sentenced him to 4 1/2 years' imprisonment. In 2018, the sentence was confirmed by the Supreme Court of Spain.

=== Reform ===
==== Function and policies ====
The IMF is only one of many international organisations, and it is a generalist institution that deals only with macroeconomic issues; its core areas of concern in developing countries are very narrow. One proposed reform is a movement towards close partnership with other specialist agencies such as UNICEF, the Food and Agriculture Organization (FAO), and the United Nations Development Programme (UNDP).

Jeffrey Sachs argues in The End of Poverty that the IMF and the World Bank have "the brightest economists and the lead in advising poor countries on how to break out of poverty, but the problem is development economics". Development economics needs the reform, not the IMF. He also notes that IMF loan conditions should be paired with other reforms—e.g., trade reform in developed nations, debt cancellation, and increased financial assistance for investments in basic infrastructure. IMF loan conditions cannot stand alone and produce change; they need to be partnered with other reforms or other conditions as applicable.

==== U.S. influence and voting reform ====
The scholarly consensus is that IMF decision-making is not simply technocratic, but also guided by political and economic concerns. The United States is the IMF's most powerful member, and its influence reaches even into decision-making concerning individual loan agreements. The U.S. has historically been openly opposed to losing what Treasury Secretary Jacob Lew described in 2015 as its "leadership role" at the IMF, and the U.S.' "ability to shape international norms and practices".

Emerging markets were not well-represented for most of the IMF's history: Despite being the most populous country, China's vote share was the sixth largest; Brazil's vote share was smaller than Belgium's. Reforms to give more powers to emerging economies were agreed by the G20 in 2010. The reforms could not pass, however, until they were ratified by the United States Congress, since 85% of the Fund's voting power was required for the reforms to take effect, and the Americans held more than 16% of voting power at the time. After repeated criticism, the U.S. finally ratified the voting reforms at the end of 2015. The OECD countries maintained their overwhelming majority of voting share, and the U.S. in particular retained its share at over 16%.

The criticism of the American- and European-dominated IMF has led to what some consider "disenfranchising the world" from the governance of the IMF. Raúl Prebisch, the founding secretary-general of the UN Conference on Trade and Development (UNCTAD), wrote that one of "the conspicuous deficiencies of the general economic theory, from the point of view of the periphery, is its false sense of universality".

=== Alternatives ===
In March 2011, the Ministers of Economy and Finance of the African Union proposed to establish an African Monetary Fund.

At the 6th BRICS summit in July 2014 the BRICS nations (Brazil, Russia, India, China, and South Africa) announced the BRICS Contingent Reserve Arrangement with an initial size of US$100 billion, a framework to provide liquidity through currency swaps in response to actual or potential short-term balance-of-payments pressures.

In 2014, the China-led Asian Infrastructure Investment Bank was established.

== In the media ==
Life and Debt, a documentary film, deals with the IMF's policies' influence on Jamaica and its economy from a critical point of view. Debtocracy, a 2011 independent Greek documentary film, also criticises the IMF. Portuguese musician José Mário Branco's 1982 album FMI is inspired by the IMF's intervention in Portugal through monitored stabilisation programs in 1977–78. In the 2015 film Our Brand Is Crisis, the IMF is mentioned as a point of political contention, where the Bolivian population fears its electoral interference.

== See also ==
- Bank for International Settlements – International financial institution owned by central banks
- Conditionality – Conditions imposed on international benefits
- Currency crisis – Type of financial crisis
- Globalization – Increasing worldwide interdependence
- Group of Ten – Countries giving extra funds to the IMF
- Group of Thirty – Consultative group on international economic and monetary affairs
- International financial institutions – Institutions spanning several countries
- List of IMF people
- New Development Bank – Multilateral development bank of the BRICS member countries
- Smithsonian Agreement – 1971 multinational concord on the convertibility of the US dollar
- The Swiss constituency – Financial institution and UN specialized agency
- World Bank residual model – Model to measure illicit financial flows
- Annual Meetings of the International Monetary Fund and the World Bank Group
