= Special Data Dissemination Standard =

Special Data Dissemination Standard (SDDS) is an International Monetary Fund standard to guide member countries in the dissemination of national statistics to the public.

It was established in April 1996.

== Members ==
There are currently 65 members.

- Argentina
- Armenia (November 7, 2003; 54th member)
- Australia
- Austria
- Belarus
- Belgium
- Brazil
- Bulgaria
- Canada
- Chile
- China
- Colombia
- Costa Rica
- Croatia
- Czech Republic
- Denmark
- Ecuador
- Egypt
- El Salvador
- Estonia
- Finland
- France
- Germany
- Greece
- Hong Kong
- Hungary
- Iceland
- India
- Indonesia
- Ireland
- Israel
- Italy
- Japan
- Kazakhstan
- Korea
- Kyrgyz Republic
- Latvia
- Lithuania
- Luxembourg
- Malaysia
- Mauritius
- Mexico
- Moldova
- Morocco
- Netherlands
- Norway
- Peru
- Philippines
- Poland
- Portugal
- Romania
- Russian Federation
- Saudi Arabia
- Senegal
- Singapore
- Slovak Republic
- Slovenia
- South Africa
- Spain
- Sri Lanka
- Sweden
- Switzerland
- Thailand
- Tunisia
- Turkey
- Ukraine
- United Kingdom
- United States
- Uruguay
- West Bank and Gaza ("Palestine" as of April 19, 2012; 71st member)
