= Christine Lagarde =

President of the European Central Bank since 2019

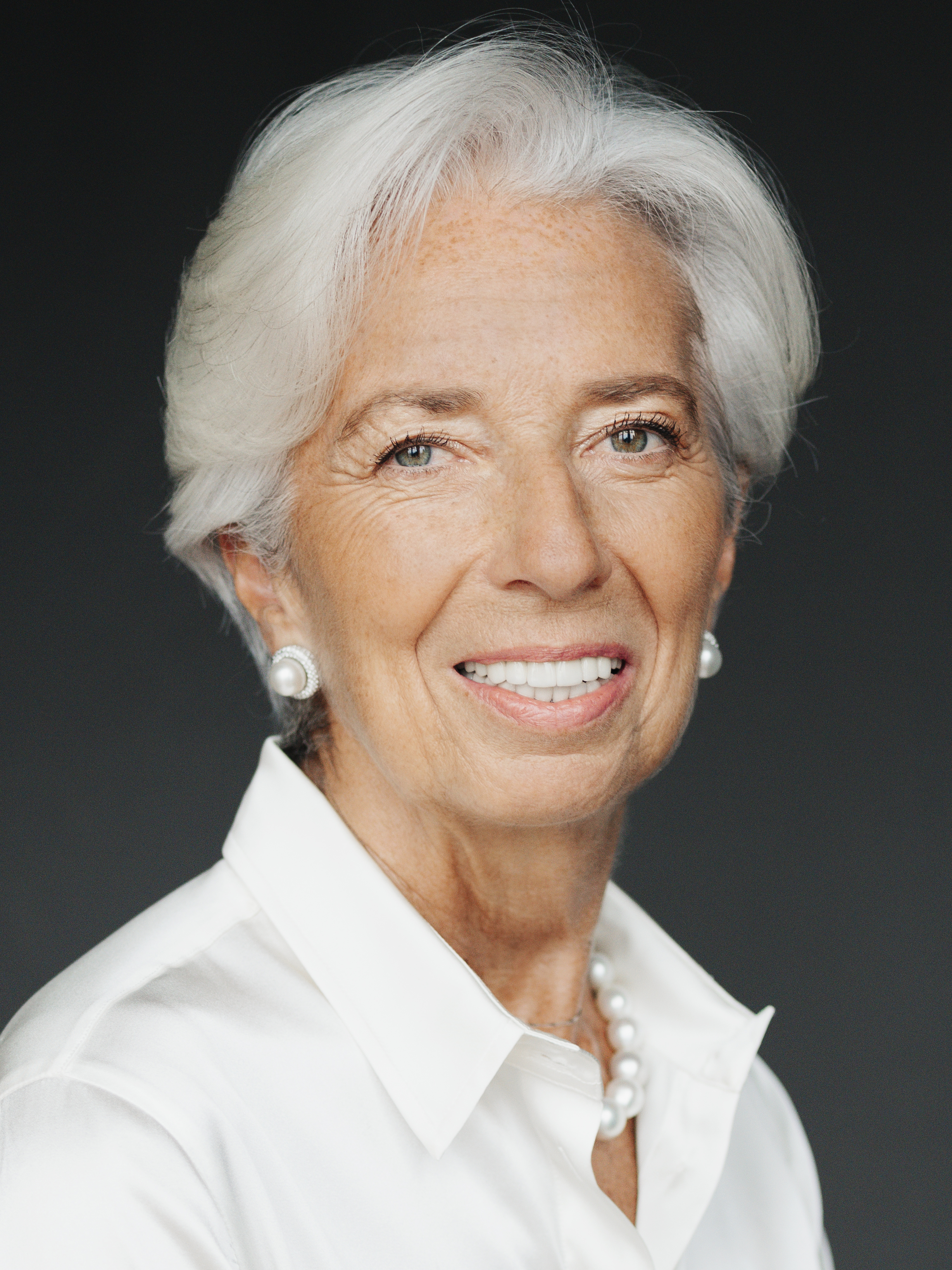
- Official portrait, 2019

President of the European Central Bank
- Incumbent
- Assumed office 1 November 2019
- Vice President: Luis de Guindos; Boris Vujčić
- Preceded by: Mario Draghi

Managing Director of the International Monetary Fund
- In office 5 July 2011 – 12 September 2019
- Deputy: John Lipsky; David Lipton
- Preceded by: Dominique Strauss-Kahn
- Succeeded by: Kristalina Georgieva

Minister of Economics, Finance and Industry
- In office 19 June 2007 – 29 June 2011
- Prime Minister: François Fillon
- Preceded by: Jean-Louis Borloo
- Succeeded by: François Baroin

Minister of Agriculture and Fisheries
- In office 18 May 2007 – 18 June 2007
- Prime Minister: François Fillon
- Preceded by: Dominique Bussereau
- Succeeded by: Michel Barnier

Minister for Foreign Trade
- In office 2 June 2005 – 15 May 2007
- Prime Minister: Dominique de Villepin
- Preceded by: François Loos
- Succeeded by: Hervé Novelli

Personal details
- Born: Christine Madeleine Odette Lallouette; 1 January 1956 (age 70) Paris, France
- Party: Union for a Popular Movement (2007–2011)
- Other political affiliations: European People's Party
- Spouse: Wilfried Lagarde (m. 1982; div. 1992)
- Children: 2
- Education: Paris Nanterre University; Sciences Po Aix

Christine Madeleine Odette Lagarde (French: [kʁistin madlɛn ɔdɛt laɡaʁd]; née Lallouette, IPA: [lalwɛt]; born 1 January 1956) is a French politician and lawyer who has been the president of the European Central Bank since 2019. She previously served as the 11th Managing Director of the International Monetary Fund (IMF) from 2011 to 2019. Lagarde had also served in the Government of France, most prominently as Minister of the Economy, Finance and Industry from 2007 until 2011. She is the first woman to hold each of those posts.

Born and raised in Paris, Lagarde graduated from law school at Paris Nanterre University and obtained a Master's degree from Sciences Po Aix. After being admitted to the Paris Bar, she joined the international law firm Baker & McKenzie as an associate in 1981, specializing in labour and anti-trust, as well as mergers and acquisitions. Rising through the ranks, she was a member of the executive committee of the firm from 1995 until 1999, before being elevated to its Chair between 1999 and 2004; she was the first woman in both positions. She held the top post until she decided to go into public service.

Lagarde returned to France when appointed Minister of Foreign Trade from 2005 to 2007, then briefly served as Minister of Agriculture and Fisheries from May to June 2007, and finally, as Minister of Finance from 2007 to 2011, making her the first woman to hold the finance portfolio of any Group of Eight economy. During her tenure, Lagarde oversaw the government response to the 2008 financial crisis, for which the Financial Times ranked her the best finance minister in the Eurozone.

On 5 July 2011, Lagarde was elected to replace Dominique Strauss-Kahn as managing director of the IMF for a five-year term. Her appointment was the 11th consecutive appointment of a European to head the IMF. She was selected by consensus for a second five-year term, starting 5 July 2016, being the only candidate nominated for the post. In December 2016, a French court convicted her of negligence relating to her role in the Bernard Tapie arbitration, but did not impose a penalty. Lagarde resigned from the IMF following her nomination as president of the ECB.

From 2019 to 2025 (excluding 2021), Forbes ranked her second on its World's 100 Most Powerful Women list.

== Early life and education ==
Christine Lagarde was born in Paris, France, into a family of teachers. Her father, Robert Lallouette, "born to a Jewish mother and a non-religious father", was an English teacher; her mother, Nicole (Carré), was a Latin, Greek and French literature teacher. Robert Lallouette converted to Catholicism while at École Normale Supérieure, influenced by a Chinese refugee who was serving as the chaplain at the school. He had briefly considered entering the seminary to become a priest himself before meeting Nicole Carré. Lagarde and her three younger brothers spent their childhood in Le Havre and were raised as devout Roman Catholics. There she attended the Lycée François 1er (where her father taught) and Lycée Claude Monet.

As a teenager, Lagarde was a member of the French national synchronised swimming team. After her baccalauréat in 1973, she went on an American Field Service scholarship to the Holton-Arms School in Bethesda, Maryland. During her year in the United States, Lagarde worked as an intern at the U.S. Capitol as Representative William Cohen's congressional assistant, helping him correspond with French-speaking constituents from his northern Maine district during the Watergate hearings. She graduated from Paris Nanterre University, where she obtained master's degrees in English, labour law, and social law. She also holds a master's degree from the Sciences Po Aix in Aix-en-Provence. Since 2010, she has presided over the Aix school's board of directors.

== Professional career ==
Lagarde joined Baker & McKenzie, a large Chicago-based international law firm, in 1981. She was a director of two of the firm's subsidiaries in tax havens. She handled major antitrust and labour cases, was made partner after six years and was named head of the firm in Western Europe. She joined the executive committee in 1995 and was elected the company's first female chairman in October 1999. Three years later she was reelected. At Baker & McKenzie Lagarde promulgated a “client first” approach whereby lawyers anticipated client needs rather than solely reacting to exigent situations.

In 2004, Lagarde became president of the Global Strategic Committee.

== Ministerial career ==
As France's trade minister between 2005 and May 2007, Lagarde prioritized opening new markets for the country's products, focusing on the technology sector. On 18 May 2007, she was moved to the Ministry of Agriculture as part of the government of François Fillon. The following month she joined Fillon's cabinet in the Ministry of Economic Affairs, Finance and Employment. She was the only member of the French political class to condemn Jean-Paul Guerlain's racist remarks of 2010. In government, she implemented liberal economic reforms, such as liberalizing the labor market, lowering estate taxes, and an austerity plan for public services.

In 2010, Lagarde sent a list of 1,991 names of Greek HSBC customers with bank accounts at HSBC's Geneva branch who were identified as potential tax avoiders to the Greek government, in an effort to assist them in cracking down on tax evasion. It was dubbed the "Lagarde list"

=== Later conviction for negligence ===
In 2011, the French Court of Justice of the Republic (CJR) launched an investigation into Christine Lagarde’s role as finance minister in approving a €403 million arbitration award to businessman Bernard Tapie. Tapie argued that Crédit Lyonnais, a French bank that was then publicly owned, had cheated him during the sale of Adidas in the 1990s. Lagarde did not personally decide how much money he received, but approved the use of private arbitration to settle the dispute, and subsequently deciding not to challenge the arbitrators' award. The award was described as unusually favourable to Tapie.Although initially questioned as an assisted witness, Lagarde was placed under investigation for negligence in 2014 and ordered to stand trial in December 2015. The investigation uncovered a handwritten letter expressing her allegiance to then-President Nicolas Sarkozy, whom Tapie also had ties to; although investigators did not determine letter was indicative of wrongdoing. In December 2016, Lagarde was found guilty of negligence in handling the arbitration, although the court declined to impose a fine or sentence. Prior to her conviction, in 2015, the courts annulled Tapie's arbitration award, requiring he repay his €403 million award, with interest, to the state.

== International Monetary Fund ==
=== Appointment ===
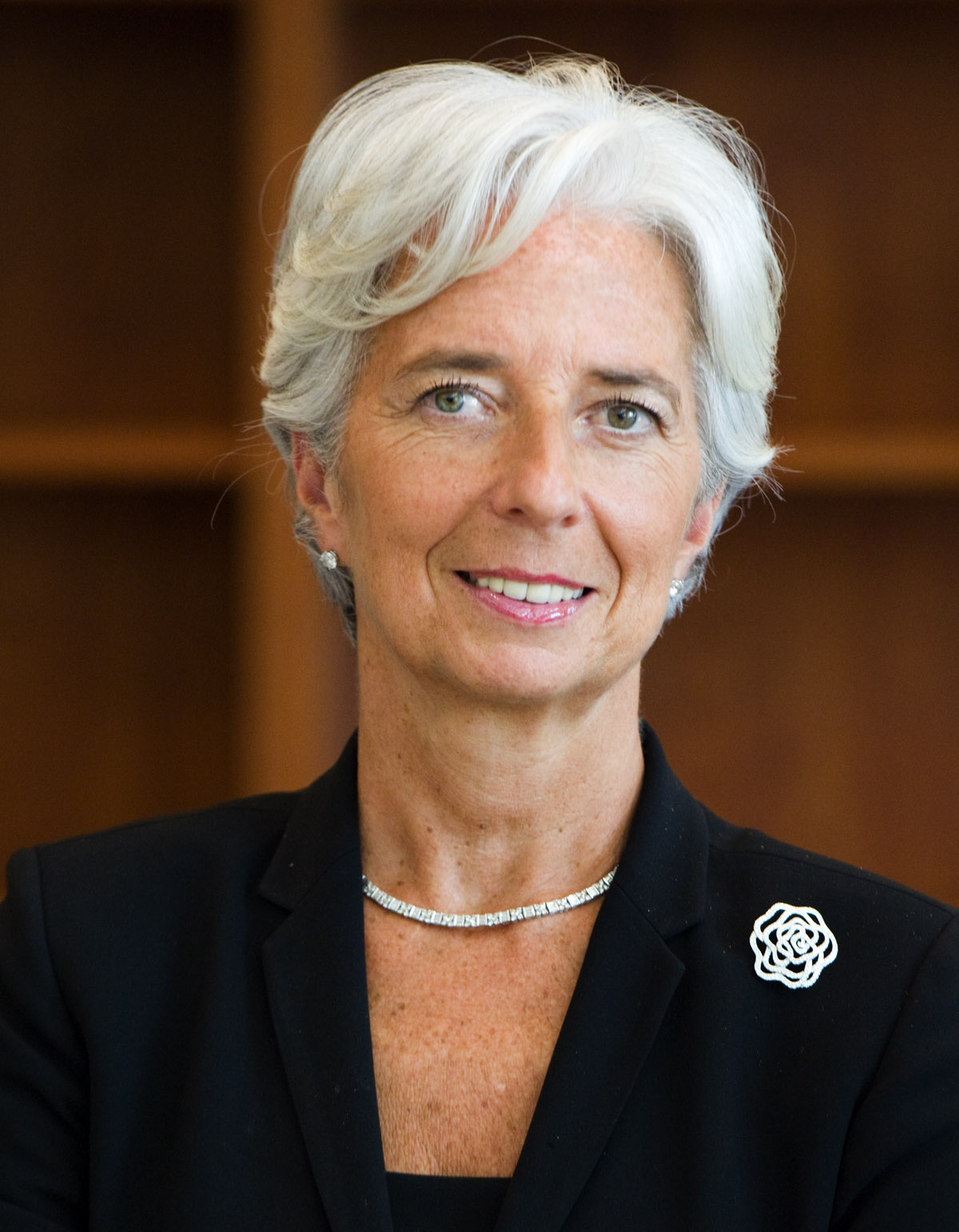
Lagarde in 2011

On 25 May 2011, Lagarde announced her candidacy to be head of the IMF to succeed Dominique Strauss-Kahn, upon his resignation. Her candidacy received the support of the British, Indian, United States, Brazilian, Russian, Chinese and German governments. The governor of the Bank of Mexico (and former Secretary of Finance) Agustín Carstens was also nominated for the post. His candidacy was supported by many Latin American governments, as well as Spain, Canada and Australia.

On 28 June 2011, the IMF board elected Lagarde as its next managing director and chairman for a five-year term, starting on 5 July 2011. The IMF's executive board praised both Lagarde and Carstens as well-qualified, but decided on the former by consensus. Lagarde became the first woman to be elected as the head of the IMF. Carstens would have been the first non-European. Her appointment came amid the intensification of the European sovereign debt crisis especially in Greece, with fears looming of loan defaults. The United States in particular supported her speedy appointment in light of the fragility of Europe's economic situation.

U.S. Treasury Secretary Timothy Geithner said that Lagarde's "exceptional talent and broad experience will provide invaluable leadership for this indispensable institution at a critical time for the global economy." President Nicolas Sarkozy referred to Lagarde's appointment as "a victory for France." Oxfam, a charity working in developing nations, called the appointment process "farcical" and argued that what it saw as a lack of transparency hurt the IMF's credibility.

On 17 December 2015, Michel Sapin, French Finance Minister, said that Lagarde could stay on as head of the IMF, despite being charged with criminal negligence. Throughout her time at the IMF, she repeatedly ruled herself out of the races to secure a top job in Europe, including the positions of President of the European Commission and President of the European Central Bank. On 2 July 2019, Lagarde was nominated to serve as the next president of the ECB, to succeed Mario Draghi. She subsequently submitted her resignation as managing director.

=== Viewpoints ===
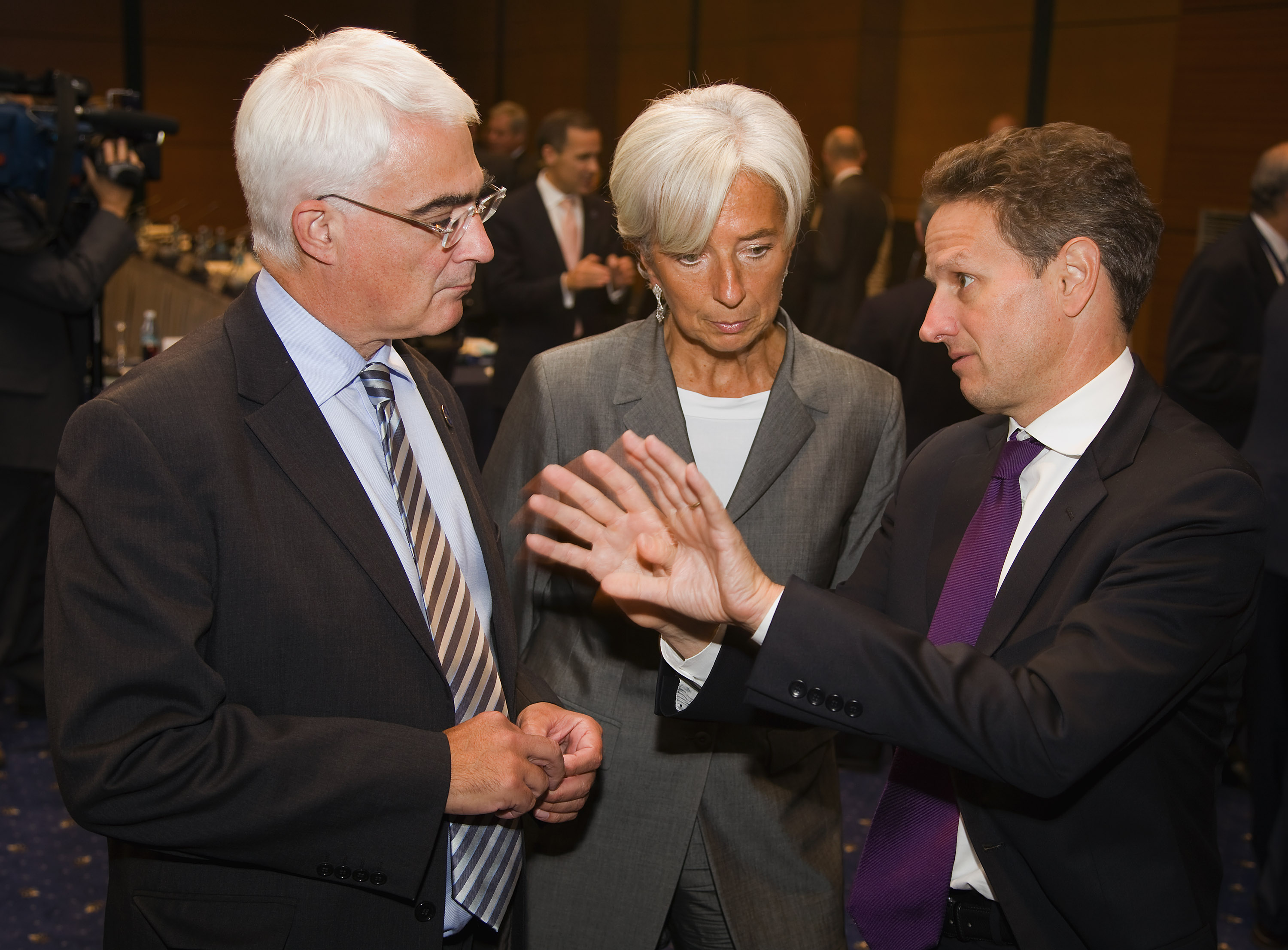
Alistair Darling (left) with Lagarde and Timothy Geithner (right) in 2009

In July 2010, Lagarde told the PBS NewsHour that the IMF's lending program for distressed European countries was "a very massive plan, totally unexpected, totally counter-treaty, because it wasn't scheduled in the treaty that we should do a bailout program, as we did." She also said, "we had essentially a trillion dollars on the table to confront any market attack that would target any country, whether it's Greece, Spain, Portugal, or anybody within the eurozone." With respect to the French economy, she stated that besides short-term stimulus efforts: "we must, very decisively, cut our deficit and reduce our debt."

In public remarks made right after her appointment, Lagarde stated that both the IMF and EU required Greek austerity measures as a prerequisite for further aid. She said, "If I have one message tonight about Greece, it is to call on the Greek political opposition to support the party that is currently in power in a spirit of national unity." She said of her predecessor that: "The IMF has taken up the challenges of the crisis thanks to the actions of Managing Director Dominique Strauss-Kahn and to his team as well." On 25 December 2011, Lagarde argued that the world economy was at risk and urged Europeans to unify in terms of the debt crisis facing the continent.

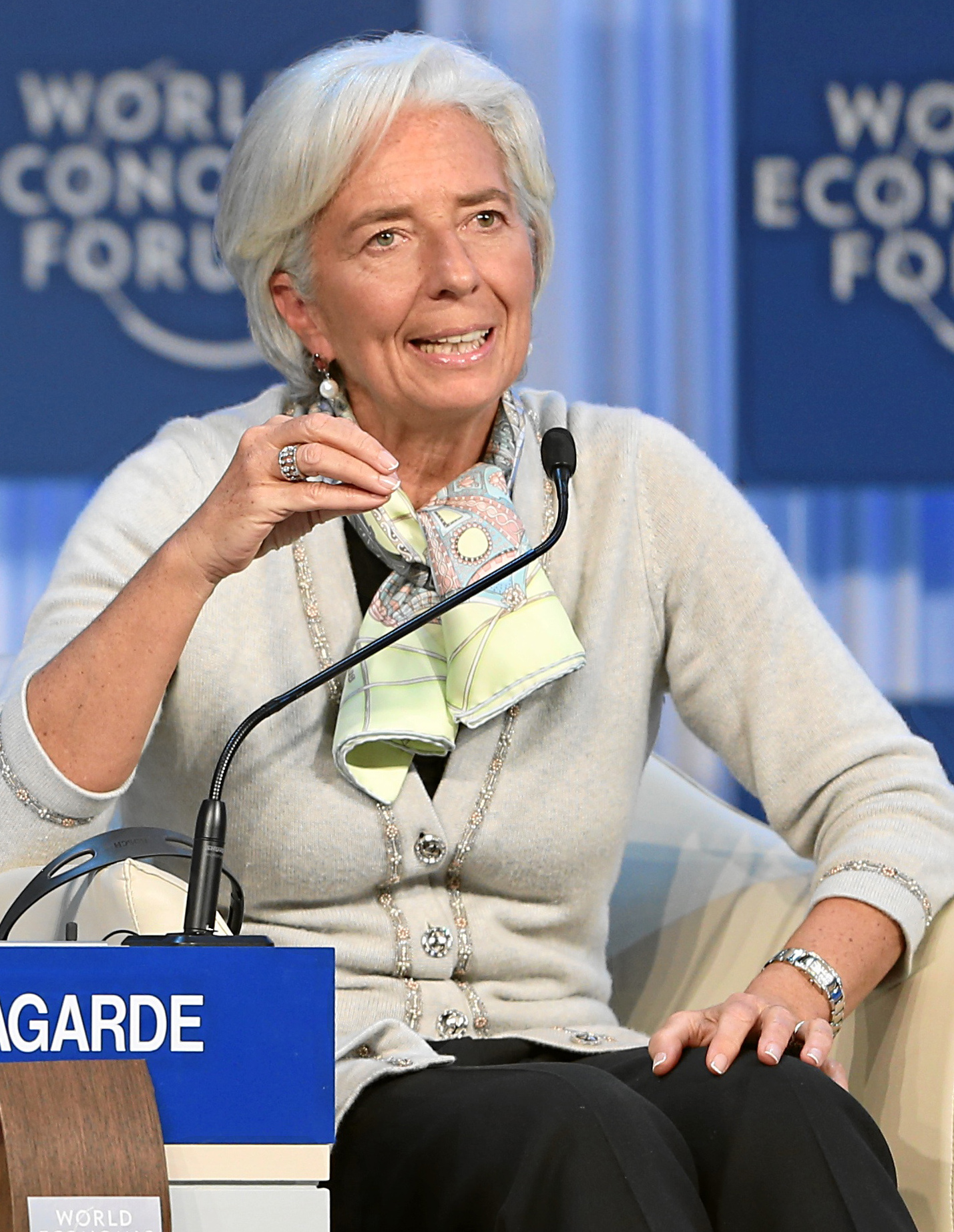
Lagarde during the World Economic Forum 2013

In July 2012, as the Greek economy continued to decline, and the country's leaders asked for an easing of the terms of external assistance, Lagarde said she was "not in the negotiation or renegotiation mood at all." A year later, though, with her own organization conceding that its "rescue" package for Greece had fallen short of what was required, Lagarde—having previously said that Greece's debt burden was "sustainable"—decided that Greece would not recover unless its debt was written off in a meaningful way. According to Yanis Varoufakis, the combative former Finance Minister of Greece, Lagarde and others at the top of the IMF were quite sympathetic behind closed doors, while stating that inside the Eurogroup there were "a few kind words and that was it". As the crisis peaked again in summer 2015, Lagarde's organization made headlines by calling for massive debt relief for Greece, a call she reiterated personally. In 2016, the IMF refused to participate with eurozone countries in further emergency financing for Greece, because concrete measures to relieve the country of its debt burden remained absent.

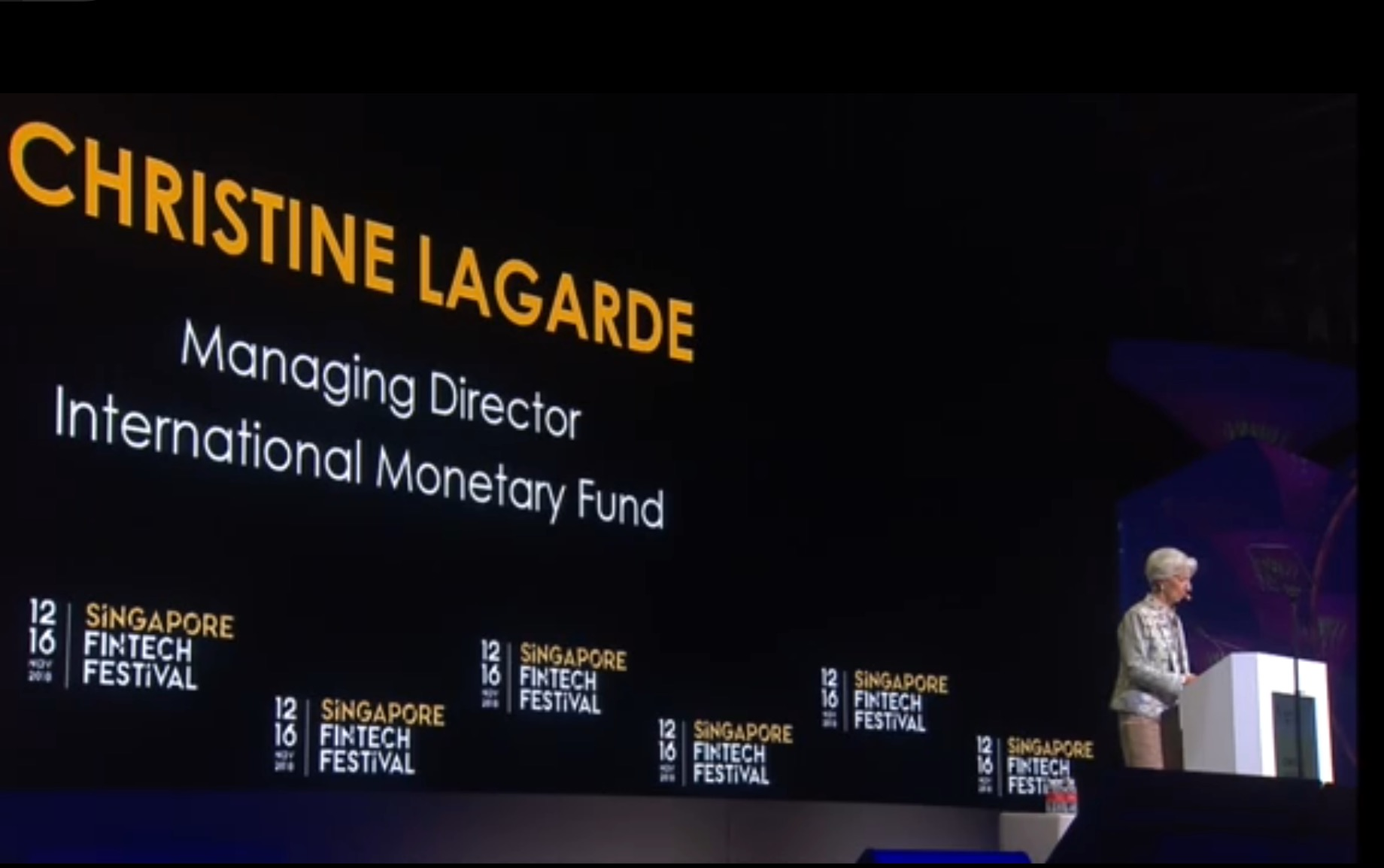
Lagarde addressing the Singapore FinTech Festival 2017

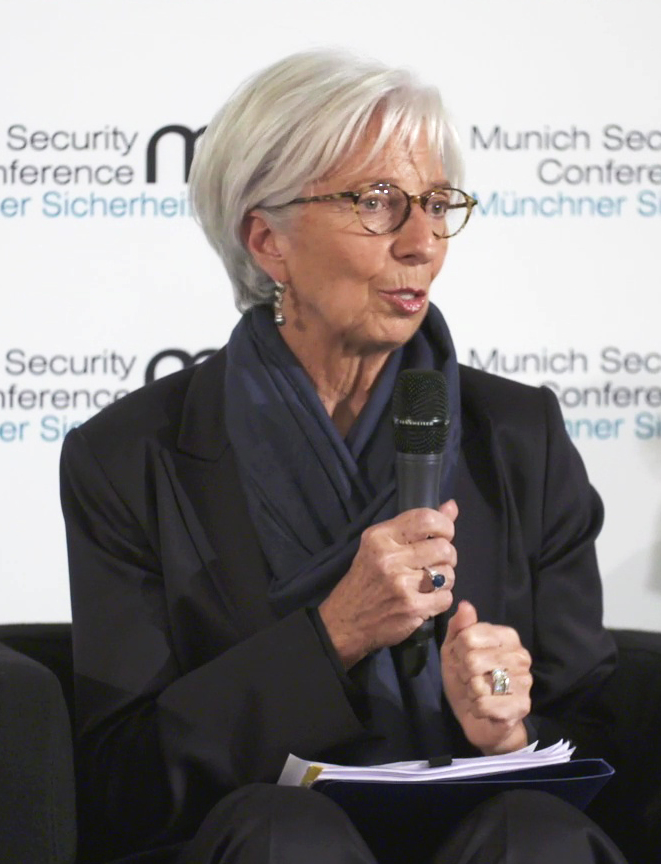
Lagarde during the Munich Security Conference 2018

Questioned about her economic philosophy, Lagarde has described herself as "with Adam Smith—that is, liberal."

==== "Payback" controversy ====
In an interview in May 2012, Lagarde was asked about the Greek government-debt crisis. She mentioned Greek tax avoidance, and assented to the interviewer's suggestion that Greeks had "had a nice time" but now "it is payback time." Her comments provoked controversy, with future Greek Prime Minister Alexis Tsipras stating, "We don't need her compassion," and then-Deputy Prime Minister Evangelos Venizelos saying she had "insulted the Greek people." In an effort to quell the negative response, the next day Lagarde made a post to her Facebook page saying: "As I have said many times before, I am very sympathetic to the Greek people and the challenges they are facing." Within 24 hours, over 10,000 comments had been left in response, many of them obscene.

In response to Lagarde's belief that not enough Greeks paid their taxes, Professor Emeritus John Weeks of the University of London said, "The moral weight of Christine Lagarde's matronising of the Greeks to pay their taxes is not strengthened by the fact that, as director of the IMF, she is in receipt of a tax-free annual salary of $468,000 (£298,000, plus perks)." Robert W. Wood, in a Forbes article, wrote that "No taxes is the norm for most United Nations employees covered by a convention on diplomatic relations signed by most nations."

==== Comment on King Abdullah ====
In January 2015, on the death of King Abdullah of Saudi Arabia, Lagarde said "he was a strong believer in pushing forward women's rights", prompting a number of observers to comment on the life of women generally in Saudi Arabia.

==== Loan to Argentina ====
In 2019, the IMF granted Argentina a loan of $57 billion - equivalent to 10% of GDP. The loan, then the largest in the Fund's history, sparked controversy within the financial institution, as such a sum was far too high for such an economically fragile country. U.S. President Donald Trump and IMF President Christine Lagarde, however, interceded to have this loan request validated to support Mauricio Macri, struggling in the polls in the run-up to the 2019 presidential election. To get this deal through the official analysis grid, IMF teams used growth assumptions that would turn out to be profoundly unrealistic. The loan was then disbursed very quickly, before the election, but would lead Argentina into a serious debt crisis, with the country unable to meet its debts.

== European Central Bank ==
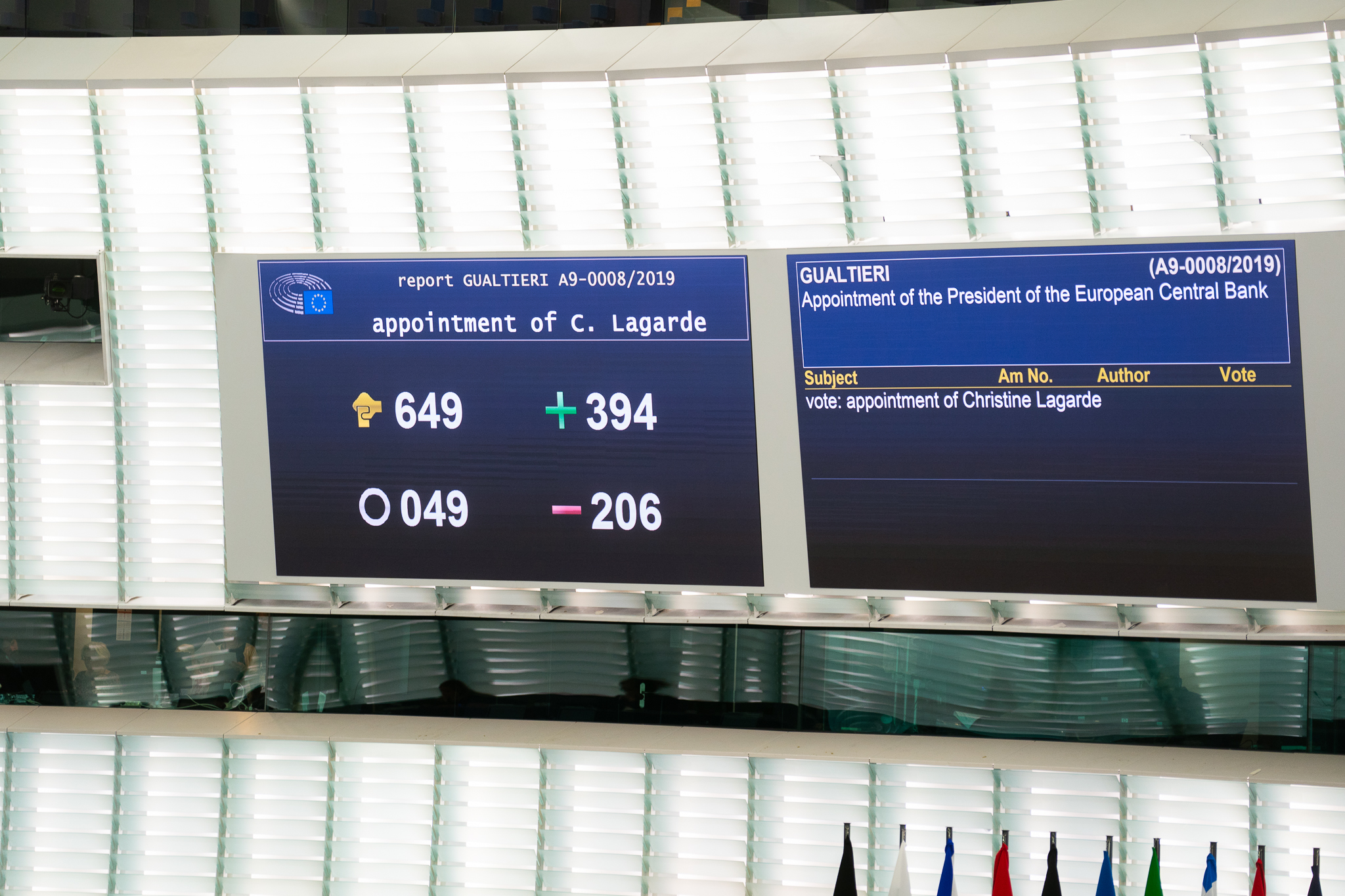
Vote of the European Parliament on Lagarde's nomination

=== Nomination ===
On 2 July 2019, Christine Lagarde was nominated by the European Council to succeed Mario Draghi as President of the European Central Bank (ECB) on 1 November 2019. On 17 September 2019, the European Parliament voted via secret ballot to recommend her to the position, with 394 in favour, 206 opposed, and 49 abstentions.

In September 2019 writers for Bloomberg opined that as president Lagarde was expected to maintain the accommodative monetary policy of her predecessor, Mario Draghi. When addressing the European Parliament's ECON Committee ahead of her appointment, Lagarde also expressed her willingness to make the ECB play a role in fighting climate change and to carry out a review of the ECB's monetary policy framework. In July 2019 Prince Michael of Liechtenstein worried that Lagarde had "been extremely supportive of heavy deficit spending and cheap money" and felt that this fact portended ill. Writers at the Wall Street Journal felt that her strength lay in her flexibility, and she was "a diplomat and negotiator, not a technocrat or economist".

=== In post ===
Christine Lagarde at the plenary session of the European Parliament (25 March 2022).

One of Lagarde's first initiatives at the helm of the ECB was to launch an overall strategic review, an exercise not conducted at the ECB for 17 years; the Financial Times opined that this change "set up a clash" with the head of the Deutsche Bundesbank, Jens Weidmann. By contrast, the Banque de France governor François Villeroy de Galhau (and member of the ECB’s governing council) was supportive, as well as an open letter whose 164 signatories included academics, economists, trade unions and environmental activists and 62 organizations like Greenpeace and Attac, who characterized the plan for the ECB to purchase financial instruments of the fossil fuel industry as "particularly shocking" . As part of this exercise, she successfully pushed the ECB to adopt an action plan to address climate change. The action plan resulted in the implementation of green finance ("tilting") in the purchase of corporate bonds programme.

In July 2024 Lagarde told reporters in Frankfurt that "implementing the EU’s revised economic governance framework fully and without delay will help governments bring down budget deficits and debt ratios on a sustained basis. This was discussed, and we believe that it’s a very strong endorsement of the principle of discipline, so that all member states that have adhered and agreed to a set of rules under the fiscal governance framework will actually apply those rules and principles." At the time, Belgium, Greece, Spain, France and Italy were considered by the ECB "high risk in the medium term". France and Italy were among several nations "scolded in June [2024] by the European Commission for running deficits well above the bloc’s 3 per cent ceiling." Another publication said she warned at the ECB Forum in Sintra about respect for EU budgetary rules: the ECB was "concerned about the fiscal rules that must be respected within the EU and the structural reforms that will lead to an improvement in productivity, which is the only way for Europe to remain strong and prosperous."

In September 2024 Lagarde announced that the ECB's primary interest rate would be cut to 3.5% because of weak eurozone growth, following of drop of inflation to 2.2%.

On 12 September 2024, after the Draghi report on EU competitiveness had been published, Lagarde said that the ECB would not help individual member states implement its recommendations: "Structural reforms are not the responsibility of the central bank — they are the responsibility of governments."

In February 2026, there were media report of her early resignation to allow outgoing French President Emmanuel Macron and German Chancellor Friedrich Merz to nominate her successor, ahead of French presidential elections. In July 2026 she said she could leave the ECB before the end of her term to take part in France’s 2027 presidential election. In October 2026, it was confirmed that she would step down from the role eight months early, in February 2027, and that she had been in talks to chair the World Economic Forum.

== Other activities ==
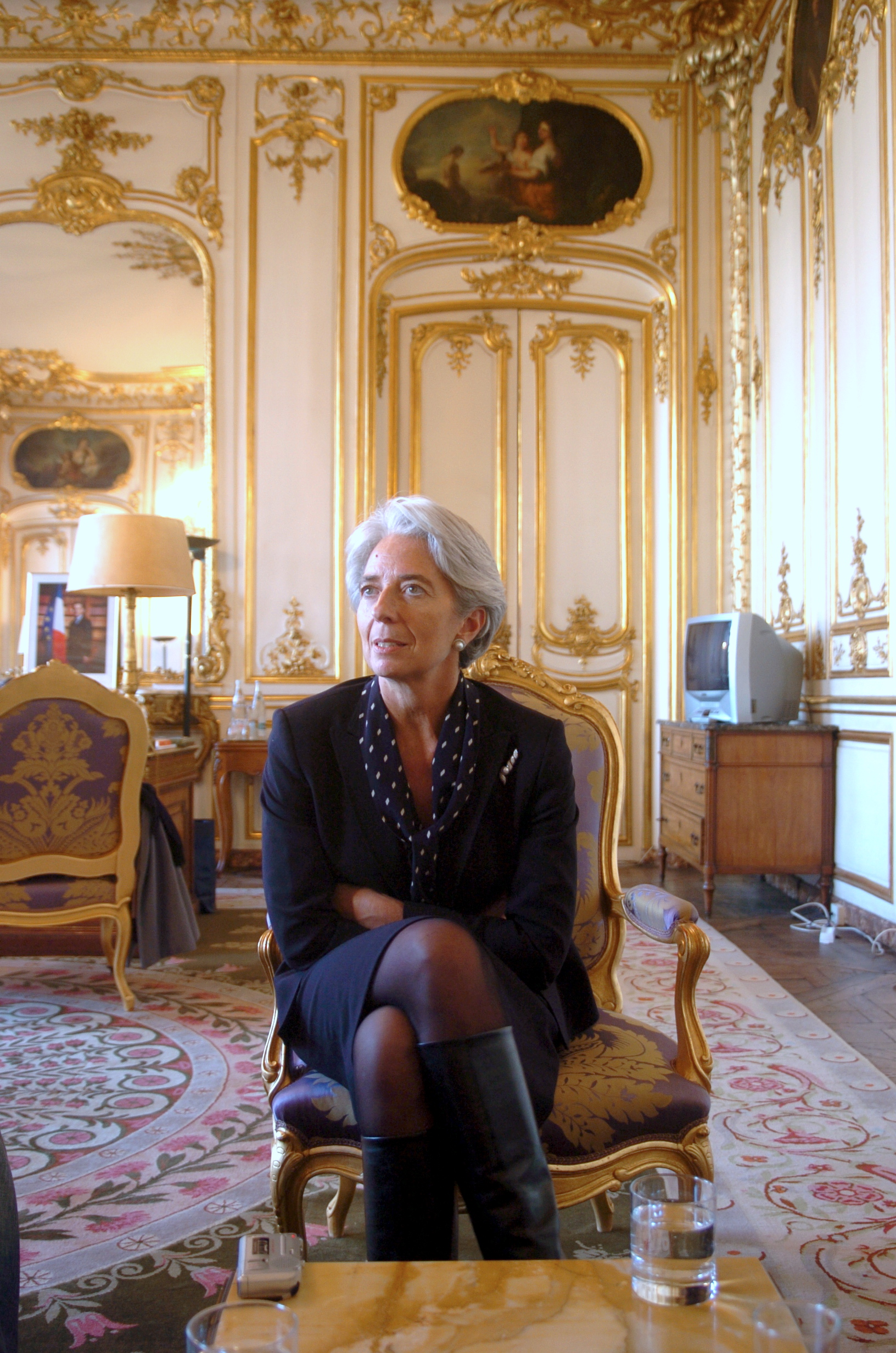
Christine Lagarde in 2007.

=== European Union institutions ===
- European Systemic Risk Board (ESRB), ex officio chair of the General Board (since 2019)
- European Investment Bank (EIB), ex officio member of the board of governors (2007–2011)

=== International organizations ===
- Bank for International Settlements (BIS), ex officio member of the board of directors (since 2019)
- Asian Development Bank (ADB), ex officio member of the board of governors (2007–2011)
- European Bank for Reconstruction and Development (EBRD), ex officio member of the board of governors (2007–2011)
- International Monetary Fund (IMF), ex officio member of the board of governors (2007–2011)
- World Bank, ex officio member of the board of governors (2007–2011)

=== Non-profit organizations ===
- World Economic Forum (WEF), member of the board of trustees (since 2011)

=== Academic institutions ===
- Honorary fellow of Robinson College, Cambridge

== Media ==
Lagarde was interviewed in the documentary film Inside Job (2010), which later won an Academy Award for Best Documentary Feature.

The American fashion magazine Vogue profiled Lagarde in September 2011.

Lagarde was portrayed by Laila Robins in the HBO television film Too Big to Fail (2011), which was based on the popular non-fiction book of the same name by The New York Times journalist Andrew Ross Sorkin.

Meryl Streep based parts of Miranda Priestly's appearance in the feature film The Devil Wears Prada (2006) on Lagarde, citing her "unassailable elegance and authority".

Lagarde presented the 2014 Richard Dimbleby Lecture, titled "A New Multilateralism for the 21st Century".

== Recognition ==
=== Awards ===
- 2011 – 9th Most Powerful Woman in the World, named by Forbes magazine
- 2012 – 8th Most Powerful Woman in the World, named by Forbes magazine
- 2013 – 7th Most Powerful Woman in the World, named by Forbes magazine
- 2014 – 5th Most Powerful Woman in the World, named by Forbes magazine
- 2015 – 6th Most Powerful Woman in the World, named by Forbes magazine
- 2016 – 6th Most Powerful Woman in the World, named by Forbes magazine
- 2017 – 8th Most Powerful Woman in the World, named by Forbes magazine
- 2017 – #1 in the List of 100 Most Influential People in Multinational Organisations, awarded by UK-based company Richtopia
- 2018 – 3rd Most Powerful Woman in the World, named by Forbes magazine
- 2019 – CARE Humanitarian Award, awarded by CARE
- 2019 – Distinguished International Leadership Award, awarded by the Atlantic Council
- 2019 – 2nd Most Powerful Woman in the World, named by Forbes magazine
- 2020 – 2nd Most Powerful Woman in the World, named by Forbes magazine
- 2022 – 2nd Most Powerful Woman in the World, named by Forbes magazine
- 2023 – 2nd Most Powerful Woman in the World, named by Forbes magazine
- 2024 – 2nd Most Powerful Woman in the World, named by Forbes magazine
- 2025 – 2nd Most Powerful Woman in the World, named by Forbes magazine

=== Honours ===
French honours

- Grand Officer of the Légion d'honneur (13 July 2026 ; Officer in 6 April 2012 ; Knight in 2000)
- Commander of the Ordre national du Mérite (2021)
- Commander of the Ordre du Mérite agricole (2008)
- Commander of the Ordre du Mérite Maritime (2007)

Foreign honours

- Grand Cross of the Order of the Southern Cross (Brazil, 2009)
- Commander of the National Order of June 27 (Djibouti, 2017)
- Grand Officier of the National Order of the Ivory Coast (Ivory Coast, 2013)
- Grand Officier of the Order of Ouissam Alaouite (Morocco, 2007)
- Medal of the Order of Friendship (Russia, 2010)
- Honorary medal of Sheikh Mohammed bin Rashid Al Maktoum (UAE, 2016)

=== Honorary doctorate ===
- Honorary doctorate from KU Leuven (Belgium) – awarded at KU Leuven Kulak
- Honorary doctorate from University of Liège.
- Honorary doctorate from Université de Montréal.

== Personal life ==
Lagarde has had three known partners. The first is the French financial analyst Wilfried Lagarde, with whom she has two sons, Pierre-Henri Lagarde (born 1986) and Thomas Lagarde (born 1988); they married in 1982 and divorced in 1992. The second is the British businessman Eachran Gilmour; sources differ on whether they were ever married. Since 2006, her partner has been the entrepreneur Xavier Giocanti from Marseille, a fellow-student at Université Paris X. Some sources say they have married, but not when.

She is a health-conscious vegetarian, and her hobbies include regular trips to the gym, cycling, and swimming.

She speaks French, English and Spanish. After she took office as president of the European Central Bank, it was reported that she intended to learn German.

== See also ==
- Notable AFS exchange students

Political offices
Preceded by François Loos	Minister of Foreign Trade; 2005–2007	Succeeded by Hervé Novelli
Preceded by Dominique Bussereau	Minister of Agriculture and Fisheries; 2007	Succeeded by Michel Barnier
Preceded by Jean-Louis Borloo	Minister of Economy, Finance and Industry; 2007–2011	Succeeded by François Baroin
Diplomatic posts
Preceded by Dominique Strauss-Kahn	Managing Director of the International Monetary Fund; 2011–2019	Succeeded by Kristalina Georgieva
Government offices
Preceded by Mario Draghi	President of the European Central Bank; 2019–present	Incumbent
