= Claire Le Flécher =

French diplomat and senior civil servant

Director General of La France Humaniste
- Incumbent
- Assumed office September 2026

Ambassador of France to Kuwait
- In office September 2021 – August 2024
- Preceded by: Anne-Claire Legendre

First Counsellor at the French embassy in Armenia
- In office September 2017 – August 2021

Deputy to the sub-director for Russia and Eastern Europe, Ministry for Europe and Foreign Affairs
- In office July 2014 – August 2017

Adviser for education to the Mayor of Paris
- In office January 2013 – May 2014

Deputy mayor of Soissons
- In office March 2008 – January 2011

Regional councillor of Île-de-France
- In office 2004–2008

Personal details
- Citizenship: France
- Education: Paris Nanterre University; INALCO; Sciences Po; École nationale d'administration
- Occupation: Diplomat • Civil servant

Claire Le Flécher is a French diplomat and senior civil servant. She was ambassador of France to Kuwait from 2021 to 2024. A graduate of Sciences Po and the École nationale d'administration (ENA), she worked as a parliamentary assistant, ministerial adviser, regional councillor and deputy mayor before joining the Ministry for Europe and Foreign Affairs in 2014. In September 2026 she was reported to be taking over as director general of the political party La France Humaniste.

== Education ==
Claire Le Flécher studied hypokhâgne and khâgne at the Lycée La Bruyère from 1992 to 1995, then took a licence (bachelor) in history and a maîtrise (masters) in political science at Paris Nanterre University (1995–1997). She studied Arabic and Russian at the Institut national des langues et civilisations orientales (INALCO) from 1995 to 2000, and attended the public service section of Sciences Po from 1997 to 1999.

In October 2008 she was admitted to the preparatory cycle for the ENA internal competition, and she was a student at ENA in 2011–2012 (the "Marie Curie" class).

== Early career ==
=== Political activism ===
Claire Le Flécher became politically active at the age of 19 during the 1995 strikes. She chaired the Sciences Po section of the Young Socialist Movement and later sat on its national bureau. She sat on the Regional Council of Île-de-France from 2004 to 2008, one of three elected councillors of the Nouveau Parti socialiste tendency of the Socialist Party, of whose National Council she was a member.

=== Ministries and local government ===
From 2000 to April 2001 she was parliamentary assistant at the Senate to the Socialist senator Bernard Angels. From April 2001 to May 2002 she was parliamentary adviser to the Secretary of State for the Budget, Florence Parly. A Journal officiel notice of 1 March 2002 appointed her technical adviser in a secretary of state's cabinet from 4 March 2002.

From September 2002 to June 2007 she headed the Cycle des hautes études pour le développement économique at the Ministry of the Economy and Finance in Vincennes, and from June 2007 to December 2010 she was a researcher in public management at the same ministry. From March 2008 to January 2011 she was deputy mayor of Soissons and vice-president of its communauté d'agglomération.

After ENA she was assigned, from 1 January 2013, to the corps of administrators of the City of Paris. Until May 2014 she was adviser for education to the mayor, Bertrand Delanoë.

== Diplomatic career ==
=== Foreign ministry and Armenia ===
Le Flécher joined the Ministry for Europe and Foreign Affairs in July 2014 and was deputy to the sub-director for Russia and Eastern Europe until August 2017. She was then first counsellor at the Embassy of France in Yerevan from September 2017 to August 2021. At her request, she was integrated into the corps of conseillers des affaires étrangères at hors classe rank on 1 September 2019.

=== Ambassador to Kuwait (2021–2024) ===
A decree of 25 August 2021 appointed her ambassador to Kuwait, succeeding Anne-Claire Legendre. She took up the post in September 2021. In October 2022 she hosted at the embassy French gendarmes who had trained 27 officers of the Kuwait National Guard in crisis management. On 14 March 2023 she spoke at an AmCham diwaniya on women in business, citing France's use of quotas to increase women's representation in positions of responsibility. An opinion piece in the Arab Times credited her with launching a France–Kuwait Friendship Society in 2023 and with promoting French-language teaching in Kuwait.

She left Kuwait on 29 August 2024, after a private farewell visit to the Emir, Mishal Al-Ahmad Al-Jaber Al-Sabah. The Arab Gulf States Institute in Washington gives the end of her mission as August 2024, and her own profile as September 2024.

==== 2022 diplomats' strike ====
In 2022, French diplomats protested a senior civil service reform that provided for phasing out the two historic diplomatic corps by 2023. Six unions and a collective of about 500 young diplomats called a strike for 2 June 2022, the first at the Quai d'Orsay since 2003. Le Flécher was one of several ambassadors who announced on Twitter that they would strike, citing the reform and the continuing reduction in diplomatic resources.

== After Kuwait ==
From March to October 2025 she was special adviser to Catherine Pégard at the Ministry for Europe and Foreign Affairs, and submitted a report to the minister on patronage (mécénat) at the ministry. On 3 June 2025, the Arab Gulf States Institute in Washington hosted a public conversation with her on Kuwait. In October 2025 she was among the vice-presidents elected to the board of Administration moderne, an association of women senior civil servants.

In February 2026, La Lettre reported that she would succeed Jacques Maire as head of the Compagnie française des expositions (Cofrex), and Le Bulletin Quotidien that she was expected to be given its presidency.

=== La France Humaniste party ===
On 15 September 2026, La Lettre reported that Claire Le Flécher, described as a former ambassador to Kuwait, was to become director general (directrice générale) of La France Humaniste, the party founded by Dominique de Villepin and the movement on which he relies for his campaign ahead of the 2027 presidential election.

== See also ==
- Embassy of France, Kuwait
- La France Humaniste
- France–Kuwait relations
