= List of senators of Val-d'Oise =

Location of Val-d'Oise in France

Following is a list of senators of Val-d'Oise, people who have represented the department of Val-d'Oise in the Senate of France. The department was created in 1968 during a reorganization of the former Seine and Seine-et-Oise departments.

== Fifth Republic ==
Senators for Val-d'Oise under the French Fifth Republic were:

| Period | Name | Party | Notes |
|---|---|---|---|
| 1968–1977 | Fernand Chatelain | French Communist Party (PCF) | |
| 1968–1977 | Adolphe Chauvin | Union of Democrats for the Republic (UDR) | |
| 1968–1977 | André Messager | Union of Democrats for the Republic (UDR) | |
| 1977–1986 | Fernand Chatelain | French Communist Party (PCF) | Died 11 June 1979 |
| 1977–1986 | Marie-Claude Beaudeau | French Communist Party (PCF) | From 1979, replacing Fernand Chatelain |
| 1977–1986 | Adolphe Chauvin | Union of Democrats for the Republic (UDR) | |
| 1977–1986 | Louis Perrein | Socialist Party (PS) | |
| 1977–1986 | Pierre Salvi | Union of Democrats for the Republic (UDR) | |
| 1986–1995 | Marie-Claude Beaudeau | French Communist Party (PCF) | |
| 1986–1995 | Hélène Missoffe | Rally for the Republic (RPR) | |
| 1986–1995 | Louis Perrein | Socialist Party (PS) | |
| 1986–1995 | Pierre Salvi | Union of Democrats for the Republic (UDR) | |
| 1986–1995 | Michel Poniatowski | Union for French Democracy (UDF) | From 1989, replacing Pierre Salvi, died |
| 1995–2004 | Alain Richard | Socialist and Republican group (SOC) | Named to the government in 1997 |
| 1995–2004 | Bernard Angels | Socialist Party (PS) | From 1997, replacing Alain Richard, named to the government |
| 1995–2004 | Marie-Claude Beaudeau | French Communist Party (PCF) | |
| 1995–2004 | Nelly Olin | Rally for the Republic (RPR); Union for a Popular Movement (UMP) | Named to the government in 2004 |
| 1995–2004 | Gérard Claudel | Union for a Popular Movement (UMP) | From 2004, replacing Nelly Olin, named to the government |
| 1995–2004 | Jean-Philippe Lachenaud | Union for a Popular Movement (UMP) | |
| 2004–2011 | Bernard Angels | Socialist Party (PS) | |
| 2004–2011 | Robert Hue | French Communist Party (PCF) | |
| 2004–2011 | Raymonde Le Texier | Socialist Party (PS) | |
| 2004–2011 | Lucienne Malovry | Union for a Popular Movement (UMP) | From 2004, replacing Nelly Olin, retained in the government |
| 2004–2011 | Hugues Portelli | Union for a Popular Movement (UMP) | |
| 2011–2017 | Francis Delattre | Union for a Popular Movement (UMP) | |
| 2011–2017 | Dominique Gillot | Socialist Party (PS) | |
| 2011–2017 | Robert Hue | Movement of Progressives (MDP) | |
| 2011–2017 | Hugues Portelli | Union for a Popular Movement (UMP) | |
| 2011–2017 | Alain Richard | Socialist Party (PS) | |

== Sources ==
- Liste des anciens sénateurs de la Vème République par circonscription (in French), Sénat de France
