= Dominique Strauss-Kahn =

French economist and politician (born 1949)

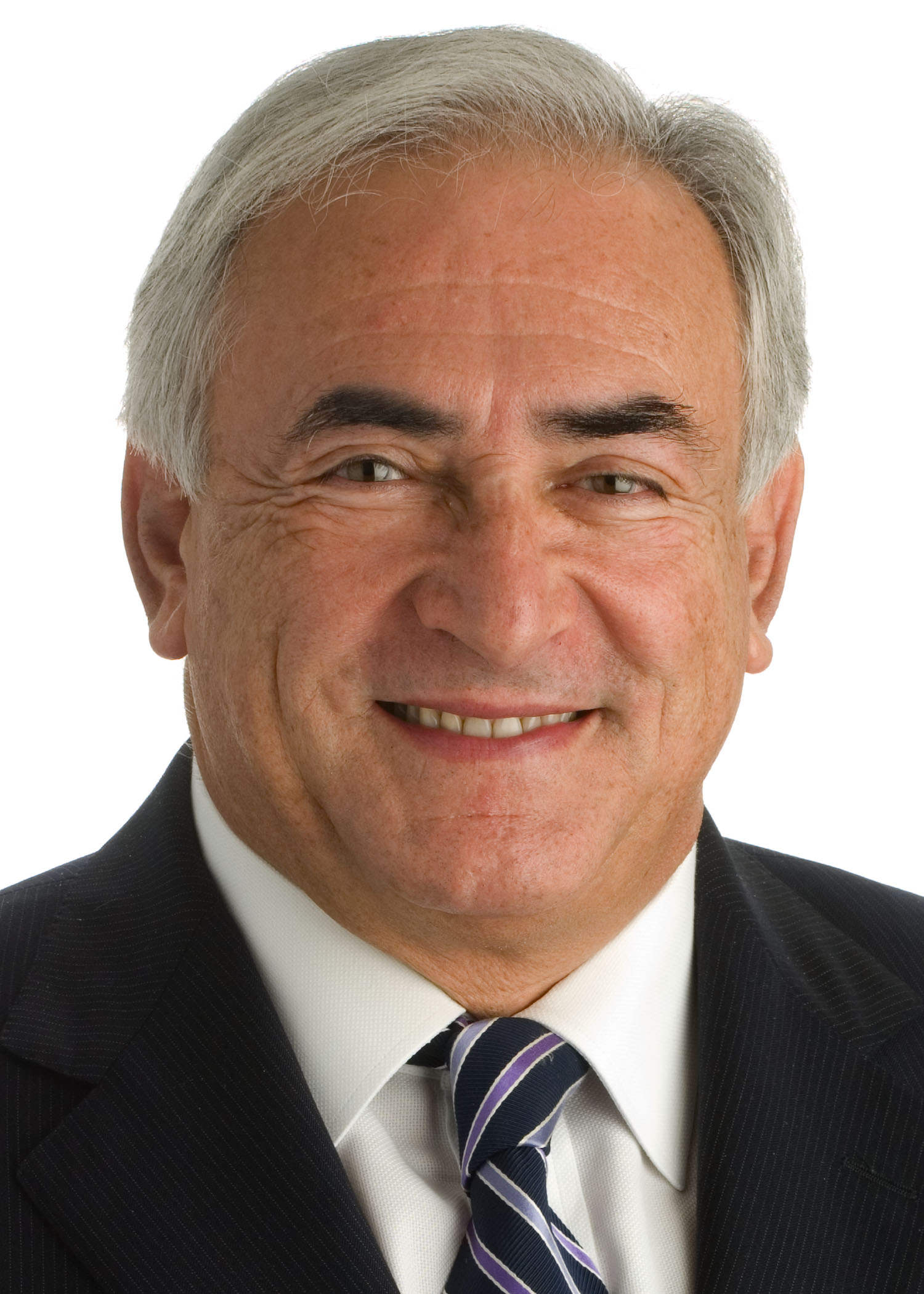
- Official portrait, 2008

Managing Director of the International Monetary Fund
- In office 1 November 2007 – 18 May 2011
- Deputy: John Lipsky
- Preceded by: Rodrigo Rato
- Succeeded by: Christine Lagarde
Ministerial and political offices
Minister of the Economy, Finance, and Industry
In office 4 June 1997 – 2 November 1999
Prime Minister	Lionel Jospin
Preceded by	Jean Arthuis (Economy and Finance); Franck Borotra (Industry)
Succeeded by	Christian Sautter
Mayor of Sarcelles
In office 23 June 1995 – 3 June 1997
Preceded by	Raymond Lamontagne
Succeeded by	François Pupponi
Minister of Industry and Foreign Trade
In office 16 May 1991 – 29 March 1993
Prime Minister	Édith Cresson; Pierre Bérégovoy
Preceded by	Roger Fauroux
Succeeded by	Gérard Longuet
Parliamentary offices
President of the National Assembly Finance Commission
In office 28 June 1988 – 16 May 1991
Preceded by	Michel d'Ornano
Succeeded by	Henri Emmanuelli
Member of the National Assembly for Val d'Oise's 8th constituency
In office 2 April 2001 – 19 October 2007
Preceded by	Raymonde Le Texier
Succeeded by	François Pupponi
In office 12 June 1997 – 4 July 1997
Preceded by	Pierre Lellouche
Succeeded by	Raymonde Le Texier
In office 23 June 1988 – 16 June 1991
Preceded by	Constituency established
Succeeded by	Bernard Angels
Member of the National Assembly
In office 2 April 1986 – 14 May 1988
Constituency	Haute-Savoie

Personal details
- Born: Dominique Gaston André Strauss-Kahn; 25 April 1949 (age 77) Neuilly-sur-Seine, Seine, France
- Party: Socialist
- Spouses: Hélène Dumas (m. 1967; div. 1984) Brigitte Guillemette (m. 1984; div. 1989) Anne Sinclair (m. 1991; div. 2013) Myriam L'Aouffir (m. 2017)
- Children: 5
- Education: HEC Paris; Sciences Po; Paris Institute of Statistics; Paris Nanterre University
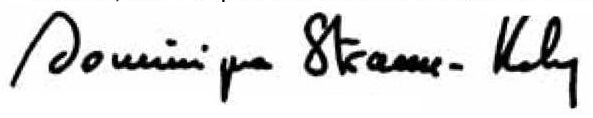
- Signature

Dominique Gaston André Strauss-Kahn (French: [dɔminik stʁos kan]; born 25 April 1949), also known as DSK, is a French economist and politician who served as the tenth managing director of the International Monetary Fund (IMF), and was a member of the French Socialist Party. He attained international notoriety due to his involvement in several sex scandals. Strauss-Kahn was a professor of economics at Paris West University Nanterre La Défense and Sciences Po, and was Minister of Economy and Finance from 1997 to 1999, as part of Lionel Jospin's Plural Left government. He sought the nomination in the Socialist Party presidential primary of 2006, but was defeated by Ségolène Royal.

Strauss-Kahn was appointed managing director of the IMF on 28 September 2007, with the backing of French President Nicolas Sarkozy. He served in that capacity until his resignation on 18 May 2011, in the wake of an allegation that he had sexually assaulted a hotel maid; the charges were later dismissed. Other sexual allegations followed, and resulted in acquittals. These accusations were seen as controversial in France, and prompted prominent conspiracy theories, as well as a debate on the role of the media in debating and determining a suspect's guilt ahead of conviction or legal proceedings having even been initiated. Numerous photos of the handcuffed Strauss-Kahn were banned from publication under French laws, while their publication in the United States prompted outrage.

These legal cases led Strauss-Kahn to drop out of the 2012 French presidential election, where he had been the favorite to win the Socialist Party's nomination (the party's eventual candidate, François Hollande, won the presidential election), and put an end to Strauss-Kahn's political career. He then resumed his activities in the private sector, mainly advising governments on their sovereign debts.

== Early life ==
Dominique Strauss-Kahn was born on 25 April 1949 in the wealthy Paris suburb of Neuilly-sur-Seine, Hauts-de-Seine. He is the son of lawyer Gilbert Strauss-Kahn. Strauss-Kahn's father was born to an Alsatian Jewish father while Strauss-Kahn's mother is from a Sephardic Jewish family in Tunisia. He and his parents settled in Morocco in 1951, but after the 1960 earthquake moved to Monaco, where his father practised law. While the family was living in Monaco, Strauss-Kahn went to school at the Lycée Albert Premier. The family later returned to Paris, where he attended classes préparatoires at the Lycée Carnot. He graduated from HEC Paris in 1971 and from Sciences Po and the Paris Institute of Statistics in 1972. He failed the entrance examination for École nationale d'administration, but obtained a bachelor degree in public law, as well as a PhD and an agrégation (1977) in economics at the Université Paris X (Nanterre).

== Marriage and children ==
Strauss-Kahn has been married four times and has five children. His first wife was Hélène Dumas, whom he married in 1967 when he was 18 and she was 20. The marriage lasted sixteen years and produced three children — Vanessa (1973), Marine (1976), and Laurin (1981) — but ended in divorce. Strauss-Kahn married his second wife, Brigitte Guillemette, a public relations executive, in 1986. Their daughter, Camille, was born in 1985. His third wife (married 1991) was Anne Sinclair, a popular French journalist, TV anchor, and heiress, the granddaughter of art dealer Paul Rosenberg. This marriage barely survived Strauss-Kahn's tenure at the IMF and the highly publicized allegations of sexual assault in 2011. In 2012, the press announced Sinclair and Strauss-Kahn's separation. Their divorce was finalized in 2013. In 2017, Strauss-Kahn married Myriam L'Aouffir, a digital communications expert. Strauss-Kahn also has an American son, Darius, born in 2010, as a result of an affair while he was serving as Director General of the IMF in Washington DC; he was sued by the mother for €8,000 monthly child support.

== Career outside politics ==
From 1977 to 1981, Strauss-Kahn lectured at the University of Nancy-II, first as an assistant, and later as assistant professor, before taking a position at the University of Nanterre. In 1982, he was appointed to the Plan Commission as head of the finance department, and later as Deputy Commissioner, a position he held until his election to the National Assembly in 1986. After his ousting in the 1993 parliamentary elections, Strauss-Kahn founded DSK Consultants, a corporate law consulting firm. Upon resigning from Lionel Jospin's government he resumed his academic duties, teaching economics at Sciences Po from 2000 until his appointment to the IMF in 2007.

== Political career ==
Strauss-Kahn was first an activist member of the Union of Communist Students, before joining in the 1970s the Centre d'études, de recherches et d'éducation socialiste (Center on Socialist Education Studies and Research, CERES) led by Jean-Pierre Chevènement, future presidential candidate at the 2002 election. There, he befriended the future Prime Minister of France Lionel Jospin (PS).

After the election of President François Mitterrand (PS) in 1981, Strauss-Kahn decided to stay out of government. He got involved in the Socialist Party (PS), which was led by Lionel Jospin, and founded Socialisme et judaïsme ("Socialism and Judaism"). The next year, he was appointed to the Commissariat au plan (Planning Commission) as commissaire-adjoint. In 1986, he was elected Member of Parliament for the first time in the Haute-Savoie department, and in 1988 in the Val-d'Oise department. He became chairman of the National Assembly Committee on Finances, famously exchanging heated words with the Finance Minister Pierre Bérégovoy (PS).

=== Minister for Industry ===
In 1991, he was nominated by Mitterrand to be Junior Minister for Industry and Foreign Trade in Édith Cresson's social-democratic government. He kept his position in Pierre Bérégovoy's government until the 1993 general elections. After the electoral defeat of 1993, Strauss-Kahn was appointed by former Prime Minister Michel Rocard chairman of the groupe des experts du PS ("Group of Experts of the Socialist Party"), created by Claude Allègre. The same year, he founded the law firm DSK Consultants, and worked as a business lawyer.

In 1994, Raymond Lévy, who was director of Renault, invited him to join the Cercle de l'Industrie, a French industry lobby in Brussels, where he met the billionaire businessman Vincent Bolloré and top manager Louis Schweitzer; Strauss-Kahn served as secretary-general and later as vice-president. This lobbyist activity earned him criticism from the alter-globalization left. In June 1995, he was elected mayor of Sarcelles and married Anne Sinclair, a famous television journalist working for the private channel TF1 and in charge of a political show, Sept sur Sept. She ceased presenting this show after Strauss-Kahn's nomination as Minister of Economics and Finance in 1997, in order to avoid conflict of interest, while Strauss-Kahn himself ceded his place as mayor to François Pupponi in order to avoid double responsibilities.

=== Minister for Economics, Finances and Industry ===
In 1997, Prime Minister Lionel Jospin (PS) appointed Strauss-Kahn as Minister for Economics, Finance and Industry, making him one of the most influential ministers in his Plural Left government. Although it was in theory contrary to the Socialist Party's electoral program, he implemented a wide privatization program, which included among others the IPO of France Télécom; he also implemented some deregulation policies in the research and development sector. The French economy achieved an excellent performance during his term of office: GDP increased, whereas unemployment and public debt decreased (creation of 300,000 jobs in 1998, a level not seen since 1969). This helped to strengthen his popularity and managed to win the support of former supporters of Jospin and Michel Rocard, making him the leader of the reform-oriented group Socialisme et démocratie. Strauss-Kahn was an early proponent of reducing the working week to 35 hours, a measure implemented by Martine Aubry, Minister for Social Policies.

In 1998, Strauss-Kahn became one of the leaders of the Socialist Party for the regional elections in the Ile-de-France region (Paris and suburbs), which were won by the PS. As Strauss-Kahn refused to swap his ministry for the executive leadership of the Ile-de-France, Jean-Paul Huchon became the president of the regional council. In 1999, he was accused of corruption in two financial scandals related to Elf Aquitaine and the MNEF Affair, a student mutual health insurance, and decided to resign from his ministerial office to fight these charges, in agreement with the "Balladur jurisprudence". He was replaced by Christian Sautter. He was acquitted in November 2001, and was reelected in a by-election in the Val-d'Oise.

As Minister of Economics and Finance, Strauss-Kahn succeeded in decreasing VAT to 5.5% for renovation works in construction, thus supporting this activity. At the same time, he decreased the budget deficit, which was more than 3% of GDP under Alain Juppé's center-right government (1995–97). He thus prepared France's entrance into the eurozone. Strauss-Kahn also repealed the Thomas Act on hedge funds, and launched the Conseil d'orientation des retraites (Orientation Council on Pensions). Strauss-Kahn succeeded in combining followers of Jospin and Rocard in the same political movement, Socialisme et démocratie, but failed to make it more than an informal network.

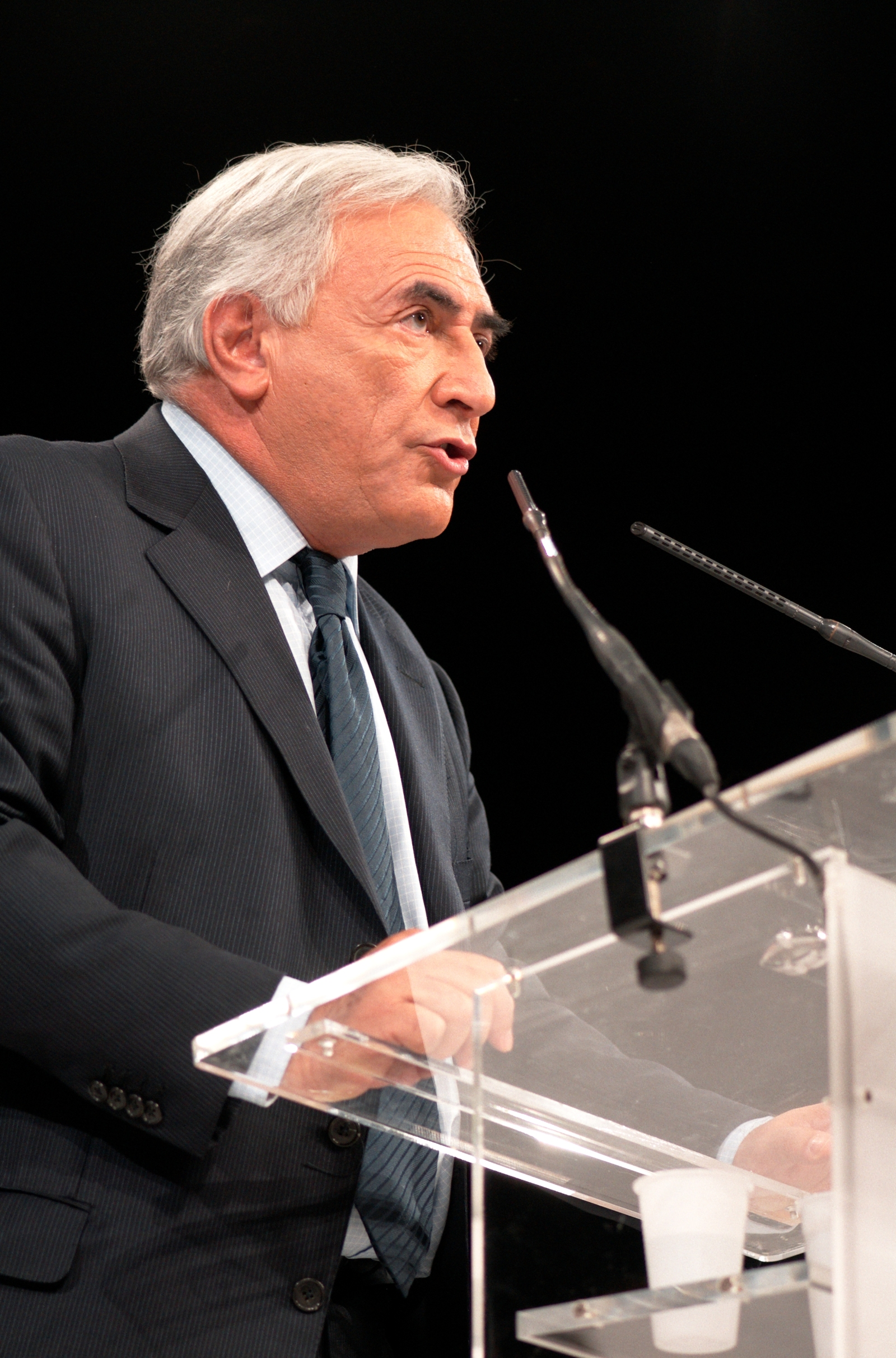
Speaking at a socialist rally in May 2007

=== In opposition ===
After Jacques Chirac's success in the 2002 presidential election and the following Union for a Popular Movement (UMP)'s majority in Parliament, Strauss-Kahn was re-elected Member of Parliament on 16 June 2002, in the 8th circonscription of the Val-d'Oise. He first declined in taking part in the new leadership of the PS, then in the opposition, in the 2003 congress of the party. But he joined the party's leadership again at the end of 2004, and was given overall responsibility for drawing up the Socialist programme for the 2007 presidential election, along with Martine Aubry and Jack Lang. During the summer meeting of 2005, he announced that he would be a candidate for the primary elections of the Socialist Party for the presidential election.

At the same time, Strauss-Kahn co-founded the think tank À gauche en Europe (To the Left in Europe) along with Michel Rocard. He presided jointly with Jean-Christophe Cambadélis over the Socialisme et démocratie current in the PS. Strauss-Kahn was one of the first French politicians to enter the blogosphere; his blog became one of the most visited, along with Juppé's, during his stay in Quebec. Strauss-Kahn then campaigned for a 'Yes' vote in the 2005 French European Constitution referendum. More than 54% of the French citizens refused it, damaging Strauss-Kahn's position inside the PS, while left-wing Laurent Fabius, who had campaigned for a 'No' vote, was reinforced.

Strauss-Kahn sought the nomination for the Socialist candidacy in the 2007 presidential election. His challengers were former prime minister Laurent Fabius and Ségolène Royal, the president of the Poitou-Charentes region. Strauss-Kahn finished second, behind Royal. On 13 April 2007, Strauss-Kahn called for an "anti-Sarkozy front" between the two rounds of the forthcoming presidential election. Following Ségolène Royal's defeat, Strauss-Kahn criticized the PS's strategy and its chairman, François Hollande. Along with Fabius, he then resigned from the party's national directorate in June 2007. Strauss-Kahn had been widely expected to seek the Socialist nomination for President of France in 2012, and was considered an early favorite.

=== IMF Managing Director ===
On 10 July 2007, Strauss-Kahn became the consensus European nominee to be the head of the International Monetary Fund (IMF), with the personal support of President Nicolas Sarkozy (member of the right UMP party). Former Polish Prime Minister Marek Belka withdrew his candidacy as it was opposed by the majority of European countries. Some critics alleged that Sarkozy proposed Strauss-Kahn as managing director of the IMF to deprive the Socialist Party of one of its more popular figures.

Strauss-Kahn became the front runner in the race to become managing director of the IMF, with the support of the 27-nation European Union, the United States, China and most of Africa. On 28 September 2007, the IMF's 24 executive directors selected him as the new managing director. Strauss-Kahn replaced Spain's Rodrigo Rato. On 30 September 2007, Dominique Strauss-Kahn was formally named as the new head of the IMF. The only other nominee was the Czech Josef Tošovský, a late candidate proposed by Russia. Strauss-Kahn said: "I am determined to pursue without delay the reforms needed for the IMF to make financial stability serve the international community, while fostering growth and employment". Under Strauss-Kahn the IMF's pursuit of financial stability included calls for a possible replacement of the dollar as the world's reserve currency. An IMF report from January 2011 called for a stronger role for special drawing rights (SDR) in order to stabilize the global financial system. According to the report, an expanded role for SDRs could help to stabilize the international monetary system. Furthermore, for most countries (except for those using the US dollar as their currency) there would be several advantages in switching the pricing of certain assets, such as oil and gold, from dollars to SDRs. For some commentators, that amounts to a call for a "new world currency that would challenge the dominance of the dollar".

In 2008, the IMF Board appointed an independent investigator following allegations that Strauss-Kahn had had an affair with a subordinate, Piroska Nagy, who was married at the time to economist Mario Blejer. Nagy alleged that Strauss-Kahn had used his position to coerce her into the affair. She was later made redundant, and Strauss-Kahn assisted her in getting a new job. The IMF board issued the findings of the investigation; while noting that the affair was "regrettable and reflected a serious error of judgment on the part of the managing director", the board cleared Strauss-Kahn of harassment, favoritism or abuse of power, and indicated that he would remain in his post. Strauss-Kahn issued a public apology for the affair. Le Journal du Dimanche dubbed him "le grand séducteur" (the Great Seducer).

Strauss-Kahn made comments that could be perceived as critical of global financial actors, in an interview for a documentary about the 2008 financial crisis, Inside Job (2010). He said he had attended a dinner organised by former Treasury Secretary Henry Paulson in which several CEOs of 'the biggest banks in the U.S.' had admitted they (or perhaps bankers in general) were 'too greedy' and bore part of the responsibility for the crisis. They said the government "'should regulate more, because we are too greedy, we can't avoid it.'" Strauss-Kahn said he warned the officials of a number of departments of the U.S. government of an impending crisis. He also said: "At the end of the day, the poorest – as always – pay the most."

Referring to his diplomatic efforts to secure IMF aid for Europe after the euro area crisis, economist Simon Johnson described Strauss-Kahn as "Metternich with a BlackBerry". In May 2011, referring to the IMF's change of heart in favour of progressive rather than neoliberal values, Joseph Stiglitz wrote that Strauss-Kahn had proved himself to be a "sagacious leader" of the institution. Following Strauss-Kahn's arrest for sexual assault in New York, economist Eswar Prasad said that should he be forced to step down, the IMF "will find it hard to find as effective and skilful an advocate for keeping the institution central to the global monetary system". John Lipsky, the IMF's second-in-command, was named acting managing director on 15 May 2011. Strauss-Kahn resigned from the IMF on 18 May 2011, after being arrested by New York police on 15 May over allegations of sexual assault. He was on a plane, about to take off, when airport police asked that the plane be stopped; he was escorted off the plane and interviewed by police. The case was later settled for an undisclosed amount, with the Associated Press and The Atlantic reporting that it was rumoured to be around $6 million.

=== Timeline ===
Managing Director of the International Monetary Fund, 2007–2011 (resignation – sexual assault case)

Governmental functions

- Minister of Industry and Foreign trade, 1991–1993.
- Minister of Economy, Finance and Industry, 1997–1999 (resignation).

Electoral mandates

- Member of the National Assembly of France for Val d'Oise (8th constituency) : 1988–1991 (he became minister in 1991) / Reelected in 1997, but he became minister / 2001–2007 (resigned on becoming managing director of the IMF in 2007). Elected in 1988, reelected in 1997, 2001, 2002, 2007.
- Member of the National Assembly of France for Savoie : 1986–1988.

Regional Council

- Regional councillor of Ile-de-France, 1998–2001 (resignation).

Municipal Council

- Mayor of Sarcelles, 1995–1997 (resignation).
- Deputy-mayor of Sarcelles, 1997–2007 (resigned on becoming managing director of the IMF in 2007). Reelected in 2001.
- Municipal councillor of Sarcelles, 1989–2007 (resigned on becoming managing director of the IMF in 2007). Reelected in 1995, 2001.

Agglomeration community Council

- President of the Agglomeration community of Val de France, 2002–2007 (resigned on becoming managing director of the IMF in 2007).
- Member of the Agglomeration community of Val de France, 2002–2007 (resigned on becoming managing director of the IMF in 2007).

=== Board of Russian Regional Development Bank and activities in Ukraine ===
In July 2013, Strauss-Kahn accepted a position as a board member of the Russian Regional Development Bank: a banking subsidiary of the Russian state oil company Rosneft. Shortly after that he also accepted a similar position at the Russian Direct Investment Fund. He was a member of the supervisory board of the bank Kredit Dnipro and involved himself in the bank Arjil, for which he raised advisory assignments to the Serbian Government in 2013 and to the Tunisian Government in 2016.

=== Adviser to the Serbian and South Sudan governments ===
On 13 September 2013, it was announced by Serbian Deputy Prime Minister Aleksandar Vučić that Strauss-Kahn would become economic adviser to the Serbian government and that he was expected in Belgrade the following week. Strauss-Kahn has helped the government of South Sudan to set up the National Credit Bank in May 2013. The bank was owned by the now bankrupt joint venture Leyne, Strauss-Kahn and Partners. But shortly after the bank was established, fighting in South Sudan began and in October 2014 he left the bank.

=== Investment banking and hedge fund ===
On 25 September 2013, it was announced that Strauss-Kahn was to join Anatevka, a small investment banking firm based in Luxembourg. The firm was also to change its name to Leyne, Strauss-Kahn and Partners or LSK. His lead partner in the venture was Thierry Leyne. In 2014, LSK announced an effort to launch a $2 billion hedge fund. Three days after Strauss-Kahn left the National Credit Bank in October 2014, Thierry Leyne committed suicide in Tel Aviv. On 7 November 2014, the company filed for bankruptcy with debts of 100 million €. France 2 television has investigated Strauss-Kahn (Cash Investigation) and has shown that he has made a profit of several millions dollars after the crash of National Credit Bank.

== New York v. Strauss-Kahn sexual assault case ==
On 14 May 2011, Nafissatou Diallo, a 32-year-old maid at the Sofitel New York Hotel, alleged that Strauss-Kahn had sexually assaulted her after she entered his suite. Strauss-Kahn was indicted on 18 May and granted US$1 million bail, plus a US$5 million bond, after 5 days. He was ordered to remain confined to a New York apartment under guard. A semen sample was found on the maid's shirt, and on 24 May it was reported that DNA tests showed a match to a DNA sample submitted by Strauss-Kahn. He was arraigned on 6 June 2011, and pleaded not guilty. On 30 June 2011, The New York Times reported that the case was on the verge of collapse because of problems with the credibility of the alleged victim, who had, according to sources within the NYPD, repeatedly lied since making her first statement. According to prosecutors, the accuser admitted that she lied to a grand jury about the events surrounding the alleged attack. Diallo said that the translator misunderstood her words. Strauss-Kahn was released from house arrest on 1 July.

After completing a lengthy investigation, prosecutors filed a motion to drop all charges against Strauss-Kahn, stating that they were not convinced of his culpability beyond a reasonable doubt due to serious issues in the complainant's credibility and inconclusive physical evidence, and therefore could not ask a jury to believe in it. The motion was granted by Judge Obus in a hearing on 23 August 2011. In a TV interview in September, Strauss-Kahn admitted that his liaison with Diallo was a moral fault and described it as "inappropriate" but said it did not involve violence, constraint or aggression. He said that Diallo had lied about the encounter and that he had no intention of negotiating with her over a civil suit she had filed against him. Strauss-Kahn later reached a settlement with Diallo for an undisclosed amount over the civil suit.

=== Aftermath ===
In the aftermath of the New York arrest, numerous other allegations of sexual misconduct were made. During the case, journalist Tristane Banon came forward with a claim that Strauss-Kahn had attempted to rape her. In September 2011, Banon stated that if there was no criminal prosecution, she would bring a civil case against Strauss-Kahn. According to a report in L'Express, Strauss-Kahn admitted to attempting to kiss Banon. In October, the French public prosecutors dropped the investigation. They stated that there was a lack of evidence regarding the allegation of attempted rape.

A pornographic parody film about the case, titled DXK, starring Roberto Malone as titular character, was crowdfunded and released in 2011. Originally, the lead character's name was announced to be Dominique Sex King, which was later changed to David Sex King. A feature film directed by Abel Ferrara, Welcome to New York (2014), was based on the Strauss-Kahn story. The film, featuring "Gérard Depardieu as Devereaux, a character modeled on Strauss-Kahn, and Jacqueline Bisset as Simone, likewise based on Anne Sinclair, ... [was] built around the Sofitel scandal and portray[ed] both characters in an unforgiving light". Sinclair said the film was "disgusting" and Strauss-Kahn's lawyer said "his client would sue the film's producers for libel". In 2020 Netflix released the documentary series Room 2806: The Accusation, a reconstruction of the Sofitel-affair and other cases of alleged sexual assault by Strauss-Kahn, based on interviews with persons involved. Strauss-Kahn declined to appear in the documentary.

== Acquittal on aggravated pimping charges ==
In March 2012, Strauss-Kahn came under investigation in France over his alleged involvement in a prostitution ring. The allegations relate to his supposed involvement in hiring prostitutes for sex parties at hotels in Lille, Paris and Washington. On 2 October 2012, a French prosecutor announced that they would discontinue the investigation of Strauss-Kahn's connection to a possible gang rape in Washington, D.C. On 26 July 2013, French prosecutors announced that Strauss-Kahn was to stand trial concerning allegations of aggravated pimping at the Carlton hotel in Lille. Strauss-Kahn was acquitted of these charges on 12 June 2015. His defense characterized the Carlton orgies as "sex between multiple and consensual partners, in a spirit of libertinage". The French court ruled that he had "behaved as a customer", not as a pimp.

== Works ==
- Inflation et partage des surplus; le cas des ménages. Cujas, 1975. (with André Babeau and André Masson).
- Économie de la famille et accumulation patrimoniale. Cujas. 1977.
- La Richesse des Français- Epargne, Plus-value/Héritage. (with André Babeau). Paris: PUF, 1977. Collection « L'économiste » ed. Pierre Tabatoni. Enquête sur la fortune des Français.
- Pierre Bérégovoy: une volonté de réforme au service de l'économie 1984–1993. Cheff, 2000. (with Christian Sautter)
- La Flamme et la Cendre, Grasset, 2002, (ISBN 2-01-279122-0)
- Lettre ouverte aux enfants d'Europe, Grasset, 2004, (ISBN 2-246-68251-7)
- Pour l'égalité réelle: Eléments pour un réformisme radical, Note de la Fondation Jean Jaurès, 2004
- DVD pour le Oui à la constitution, 2005
- 365 jours, journal contre le renoncement, Grasset, 2006

== See also ==
- MeToo movement
- Weinstein effect

National Assembly of France
Preceded by Yves Sautier	Deputy of the National Assembly for Haute-Savoie; 1986–1988	Succeeded by Michel Meylan
Political offices
Preceded by Raymond Lamontagne	Mayor of Sarcelles; 1995–1997	Succeeded by François Pupponi
Preceded by Roger Fauroux	Minister of Industry and External Trade; 1991–1993	Succeeded by Gérard Longuet
Preceded by Jean Arthuis	Minister of Economy, Finance and Industry; 1997–1999	Succeeded by Christian Sautter
Diplomatic posts
Preceded by Rodrigo Rato	Managing Director of the International Monetary Fund; 2007–2011	Succeeded by John Lipsky; Acting
