= Val-d'Oise's 8th constituency =

Constituency of the French Fifth Republic

8th constituency of Val-d'Oise
- inline Constituency of the National Assembly of France

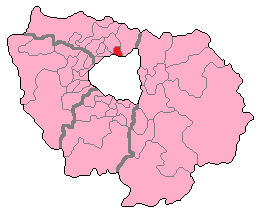
- Val-d'Oise's 8th Constituency shown within Île-de-France
- Deputy: Carlos Martens Bilongo; LFI
- Department: Val-d'Oise
- Cantons: Garges-lès-Gonesse-Est - Garges-lès-Gonesse-Ouest - Sarcelles-Nord-Est - Villiers-le-Bel
- Registered voters: 54,551

The 8th constituency of Val-d'Oise is a French legislative constituency in the Val-d'Oise département. It is currently represented by Carlos Martens Bilongo of LFI.

== Description ==
The 8th constituency of Val-d'Oise contains the town of Garges-lès-Gonesse and the north eastern half of Sarcelles.

The seat is notable for being held by former Finance Minister, head of the International Monetary Fund and candidate for the PS presidential nomination Dominique Strauss-Kahn.

== Historic Representation ==
Election	Member	Party
1986	Proportional representation – no election by constituency	
1988	Dominique Strauss-Kahn	PS
1991	Bernard Angels	PS
1993	Pierre Lellouche	RPR
1997	Dominique Strauss-Kahn	PS
1997	Raymonde Le Texier	PS
2001	Dominique Strauss-Kahn	PS
2002	Dominique Strauss-Kahn	PS
2007	Dominique Strauss-Kahn	PS
2007	François Pupponi	PS
2012	François Pupponi	PS
2017	François Pupponi	PS
2018	François Pupponi	LT
2020	François Pupponi	MoDem
2022	Carlos Martens Bilongo	LFI

== Election results ==
=== 2024 ===
Candidate	Party	Alliance	First round			Second round		
Candidate	Party	Alliance	Votes	%	+/–	Votes	%	+/–
Carlos Martens Bilongo	LFI	NFP	17,386	58.27	+18.01			
Thierry Fouchereau	RN		5,840	19.57	+8.13			
Ramzi Zinaoui	UDI	ENS	3,293	11.04	-13.38			
Patrick Angrevier	DVD		1,961	6.57	N/A			
Luisa Varela	REC		503	1.69	-1.60			
Malika Kherfi	DIV		451	1.51	N/A			
Rémi Gajdos	LO		404	1.35	+0.45			
Jean-Baptiste Tondu	NPA		0	0.00	N/A			
Valid votes			29,838	95.66	-1.65			
Blank votes			593	1.90	-0.07			
Null votes			762	2.44	+1.72			
Turnout			31,193	55.94	+23.02			
Abstentions			24,573	44.06	-23.02			
Registered voters			55,766					
Source: Ministry of the Interior, Le Monde
Result						LFI HOLD		

=== 2022 ===
Legislative Election 2022: Val-d'Oise's 8th constituency
Party	Candidate	Votes	%	±%
LFI (NUPÉS)	Carlos Martens Bilongo	6,485	37.14	-18.06
MoDem (Ensemble)	François Pupponi	4,263	24.42	N/A
RN	Véronique Mérienne	1,998	11.44	−0.08
UDI (UDC)	Patrick Angrevier	1,499	8.59	−2.34
DVG	Farouk Zaoui	807	4.62	N/A
REC	Muriel Gautherin	574	3.29	N/A
DVG	Shaïstah Raja	545	3.12	N/A
DVG	Daniel Auguste	438	2.51	N/A
Others	N/A	851		
Turnout		17,943	32.92	+0.83
2nd round result
LFI (NUPÉS)	Carlos Martens Bilongo	11,282	61.72	-4.08
MoDem (Ensemble)	François Pupponi	6,997	38.28	N/A
Turnout		18,279	35.17	+4.24
LFI gain from PS				

=== 2017 ===
Candidate	Label	First round		Second round	
Candidate	Label	Votes	%	Votes	%
François Pupponi	PS	6,474	38.37	10,252	65.80
Samy Debah	DIV	2,352	13.94	5,328	34.20
Pamela Hocini	FI	2,035	12.06		
Tifanny Alleau	FN	1,944	11.52		
Chantal Grolier	UDI	1,844	10.93		
Mohammed Farid	PCF	481	2.85		
Jean-Didier Dossou	DIV	409	2.42		
Laëtitia Zidée	ECO	324	1.92		
Marie-Laure Yapi	DIV	230	1.36		
Adhal Bara	DIV	173	1.03		
Pierre Valesa	ECO	170	1.01		
Rémi Gajdos	EXG	145	0.86		
Aysenur Catakli	DIV	117	0.69		
Farid Saidani	ECO	90	0.53		
Navaz Mouhamadaly	ECO	83	0.49		
Votes		16,871	100.00	15,580	100.00
Valid votes		16,871	96.38	15,580	92.34
Blank votes		438	2.50	859	5.09
Null votes		196	1.12	434	2.57
Turnout		17,505	32.09	16,873	30.93
Abstentions		37,046	67.91	37,681	69.07
Registered voters		54,551		54,554	
Source: Ministry of the Interior

=== 2012 ===
Legislative Election 2012: Val-d'Oise's 8th constituency
Party	Candidate	Votes	%	±%
PS	François Pupponi	10,997	50.22	
UMP	Marie-France Blanchet	4,903	22.39	
FN	Michel Thooris	2,298	10.50	
FG	Francis Parny	1,669	7.62	
DVG	Boualem Snaoui	505	2.31	
EELV	Armand Atonga	493	2.25	
MoDem	Benoît Jimenez	484	2.21	
Others	N/A	547		
Turnout		21,896	42.07	
2nd round result
PS	François Pupponi	14,169	66.30	
UMP	Marie-France Blanchet	7,201	33.70	
Turnout		21,370	41.06	
PS hold				

=== 2007 ===
Legislative Election 2007: Val-d'Oise's 8th constituency
Party	Candidate	Votes	%	±%
UMP	Sylvie Noachovitch	9,136	37.37	
PS	Dominique Strauss-Kahn	9,046	37.00	
FN	Roger Eliman	978	4.00	
PCF	Francis Parny	874	3.57	
MoDem	Jean-Michel Cadiot	812	3.32	
DIV	Boualem Snaoui	735	3.01	
DVG	Rachid Adda	659	2.70	
Far left	Philippe Guegdes	531	2.17	
Others	N/A	1,678		
Turnout		24,859	50.89	
2nd round result
PS	Dominique Strauss-Kahn	14,154	55.47	
UMP	Sylvie Noachovitch	11,363	44.53	
Turnout		26,088	53.42	
PS hold				

=== 2002 ===
Legislative Election 2002: Val-d'Oise's 8th constituency
Party	Candidate	Votes	%	±%
PS	Dominique Strauss-Kahn	9,259	38.62	
UDF	Sophie Jacquest	4,065	16.96	
FN	Rejane Dore	3,480	14.52	
UMP	Romana Navarre	2,350	9.80	
PCF	Francis Parny	1,366	5.70	
DVD	Ahmed Guenad	812	3.39	
DVG	Dieudonne M'bala M'bala	523	2.18	
Others	N/A	2,640		
Turnout		24,406	56.58	
2nd round result
PS	Dominique Strauss-Kahn	11,911	55.01	
UDF	Sophie Jacquest	9,741	44.99	
Turnout		22,476	52.11	
PS hold				

=== 1997 ===
Legislative Election 1997: Val-d'Oise's 8th constituency
Party	Candidate	Votes	%	±%
PS	Dominique Strauss-Kahn	10,055	36.62	
RPR	Michel Montaldo	5,749	20.94	
FN	Jean-Luc Vazeilles	5,517	20.10	
PCF	Lucette Lebeau	2,711	9.87	
GE	Jean-Pierre Gellée	687	2.50	
DVD	Raymond Strub	570	2.08	
Others	N/A	2,165		
Turnout		28,564	62.33	
2nd round result
PS	Dominique Strauss-Kahn	16,967	59.65	
RPR	Michel Montaldo	11,477	40.35	
Turnout		30,212	65.93	
PS gain from RPR				

== Sources ==
Official results of French elections from 2002: "Résultats électoraux officiels en France" (in French).
