= France–Kuwait relations =

- France: Kuwait

Diplomatic mission
- Embassy of France in Kuwait Al Hamra Tower, Al Shuhada Street, Kuwait City: Embassy of Kuwait in France; 2 rue de Lübeck, 75016 Paris

France–Kuwait relations are the international relations between the French Republic and the State of Kuwait.

== History ==
In 1778, a French emissary sent to the Indies was captured near Basra and released in Kuwait, where he placed himself under the protection of the ruling family. This was the first contact between the two peoples. As Kuwait gradually opened up, commercial relations intensified. Kuwait was an obligatory stopover between the Indies, the Ottoman Empire and Europe. Kuwait made its fortune in the pearl trade, and the pearls were resold by French jewellers on the Champs-Élysées; the French press was read in Kuwait.

Kuwait later fell within the British sphere of influence, and the United Kingdom discovered oil there.

France recognised Kuwait's independence two months after it was proclaimed in 1961. Kuwait quickly became an important supplier of oil. During the Arab–Israeli conflicts, France adopted a pro-Arab position from 1967 onwards, which enabled close cooperation and the signing of contracts in the field of armaments.

In 1991, following the invasion of Kuwait by Iraq, France, alongside the United States of America and under a United Nations mandate, took part in the liberation of Kuwait during Operation Daguet. In 1992, France concluded a defence agreement with Kuwait.

=== Diplomatic relations ===
Following the Iraqi invasion of Kuwait on 2 August 1990, France, as a member of the United Nations Security Council, voted for all resolutions aimed at protecting the emirate. After Kuwait's sovereignty was restored, France concluded a defence agreement guaranteeing Kuwait's security.

On 26 August 1990, President François Mitterrand declared that Kuwait's sovereignty was non-negotiable and decided to deploy some 18,000 French troops to help liberate the country, support that Kuwait continues to acknowledge. The defence agreement was signed in August 1992 and provides for cooperation in the event of external aggression against Kuwait, including joint exercises, exchange of expertise and training of personnel; a further military cooperation agreement followed in December 2006.

==== Bilateral framework ====
The two countries hold strategic dialogue sessions, alternately in Paris and Kuwait City, and have set up a Kuwait–France Friendship Committee. Economic cooperation rests on a tax cooperation agreement signed in 1973 and an investment promotion and protection agreement concluded in 1989; French companies are reported to account for around half of European companies operating in Kuwait, with French investment concentrated in energy, infrastructure and cosmetics. On 13 July 2025, during a visit by the Amir to France, the two sides signed a declaration of intent on a Kuwait–France Strategic Investment Partnership for 2025–2035 and a declaration on cultural cooperation to mark the 65th anniversary of relations in 2026. On 24 July 2025, the Kuwait National Guard and the French Gendarmerie signed a memorandum of understanding on coordination, cooperation and military and security training. In February 2025, Kuwait's health minister signed a memorandum of understanding with the Gustave Roussy cancer centre.

=== Visit of Emmanuel Macron ===
On Monday 19 October 2026, President Emmanuel Macron made an official visit to Kuwait, the first stop of a three-day Gulf tour that was reported to continue to the United Arab Emirates, Bahrain and Qatar; he was accompanied by executives of TotalEnergies and Engie. He was received at the airport by the Amir, Sheikh Meshal Al-Ahmad Al-Jaber Al-Sabah, together with the Crown Prince and senior ministers. The French delegation included the Minister of the Armed Forces and Veterans, Catherine Vautrin, the Minister for Europe and Foreign Affairs, Jean-Noël Barrot, and ministers delegate Alice Rufo and Sébastien Martin. The visit marked the 65th anniversary of relations.

The two countries signed eight documents: a letter of intent on defence cooperation, six declarations and a memorandum of understanding, covering defence, civil aviation, artificial intelligence, investment, health and academic cooperation. They included a declaration on strategic cooperation in aviation between the Kuwait Investment Authority and Airbus, a declaration between the Authority, the Kuwaiti Ministry of Health and the Gustave Roussy institute, and a memorandum between the Kuwait Foundation for the Advancement of Sciences and Airbus Africa Middle East. The Amir presented Macron with the Mubarak Al-Kabeer Collar, and Macron awarded the Amir the Grand Cross of the National Order of the Legion of Honour. The Kuwaiti Cabinet reviewed the outcomes of the visit on 20 October 2026.

== Contemporary period ==
=== Economic relations ===
Kuwait is France's third-largest supplier among the Gulf countries, behind Saudi Arabia and the United Arab Emirates.

In 2017, Kuwait was the largest buyer of French arms, with contracts worth €1.1 billion in armaments purchases.

=== Geopolitical and defence relations ===
The defence agreement signed in 1992 was renewed in 2009. It allows France to maintain a military presence in the Gulf and to intervene against the Islamic State. Under the terms of the agreement, France and Kuwait conduct joint military exercises, and Kuwaiti military personnel are trained in France.

In 2016, France announced the sale of 30 Caracal helicopters to Kuwait for more than one billion euros. Kuwait chose the French offer over proposals from Agusta and Sikorsky.

France supports Kuwait's mediation initiative in the crisis between Qatar and Saudi Arabia.

=== Cultural relations ===
In Kuwait, French is taught in public middle schools and in the National Guard. France has opened a French lycée in Kuwait. The French language is perceived in Kuwait as highly prestigious.

Cooperation is intense in the field of archaeology. In 2016, the French Centre for Archaeology and Social Sciences established itself in Kuwait.

== Resident diplomatic missions ==
- France has an embassy in Kuwait City.
- Kuwait has an embassy in Paris.

== See also ==
- Foreign relations of France
- Foreign relations of Kuwait
- Ambassadors of France to Kuwait:
  - Claire Le Flécher
  - Anne-Claire Legendre
