= Embassy of France, Kuwait =

Embassy of France in Kuwait
- Address: Al Hamra Tower, Al Shuhada Street, Kuwait City
- Ambassador: Olivier Gauvin
- Website: kw.diplomatie.gouv.fr/fr

The Embassy of France in Kuwait is the diplomatic mission of the French Republic to the State of Kuwait. It is located in Kuwait City, and the current ambassador is Olivier Gauvin, who was appointed on 24 June 2024.

The embassy has been located in Al Hamra Tower since 2014, having previously occupied a villa in the Mansouriah district of Kuwait City. Besides its diplomatic functions, it hosts a consular section and the visa service for France.

== Location ==
Al Hamra tower where the Embassy is located today

The embassy is located on the 40th floor of Al Hamra Tower, Al Shuhada Street, Kuwait City. It also houses a consular section. France shares this 40th floor with Germany, having its own embassy aswell. Both embassies are side by side with a shared reception and conference room. The official address is Al Hamra Business Tower, 40th floor, Al Shuhada Street, Sharq, Block 8.

A Times Kuwait article published on 22 January 2019, the day the Aachen Treaty was signed, described the arrangement as unique worldwide. The two chanceries adjoin one another and pool common facilities, which the article says divides costs and lets the ambassadors meet daily. The then French ambassador, Marie Masdupuy, and her German counterpart, Karlfried Bergner, were quoted presenting the co-location as an illustration of Franco-German friendship.

=== Former premises and 2014 relocation ===
Before 2014 the embassy was housed in a single-storey residential villa in Mansouriah (Block 1, Street 13, Villa 24) in Kuwait City. According to a video account of the move, the site suffered recurrent flooding during heavy rains, which affected staff and damaged the ministry's archives. The Quai d'Orsay is said to have weighed a major renovation against a full relocation and, on grounds of sound management of public funds and to remove the climatic risk permanently, opted to relocate the chancery to the 40th floor of Al Hamra Tower, in the Sharq district, during the tenure of ambassador Christian Nakhlé.

	Former embassy	Current embassy
Building	Residential villa	Skyscraper (Al Hamra Tower, 40th floor)
Address	Mansouriah, Block 1, Street 13, Villa 24	Al Shuhada Street, Sharq, Block 8, Kuwait City
Period	Until 2014	Since 2014

=== Aborted projects of a new embassy ===
In 1987–1988, before the Gulf War, the architect Edmond Lay worked on a design for a new French embassy in Kuwait, in collaboration with the engineering firm (bureau d'études techniques) of Jean Lalanne. The surviving preliminary studies, dated from 24 December 1987 to 20 May 1988, comprise 27 drawings, including floor plans for the ground floor, upper floors and basement, a structural plan, and south, east and west elevations. The project was never built; the archive description states that the Gulf War put an end to it.

== Functions and services ==
The embassy is the representation of France to the State of Kuwait and is placed under the authority of the French ministry of foreign affairs. It is responsible for representing French interests in fields including the economy, defence, culture, and university and scientific cooperation, and it maintains regular contact with Kuwaiti political, economic, military, judicial and cultural figures. Its consular section handles passports, national identity cards, civil status, nationality and social affairs for French citizens, as well as visa applications for France. The embassy's services are not open to the public without an appointment.

=== French community in Kuwait ===
As of 31 December 2016, 1,144 French citizens were registered with the consular register in Kuwait.

== History ==
France recognised Kuwait's independence on 28 August 1961 and initially accredited its ambassador to Lebanon to the Kuwaiti government. The first resident ambassador was appointed on 31 July 1968.

Together with the accreditation of its ambassador in Beirut, France opened a permanent trade mission in Kuwait in 1961, and diplomatic relations were formally established in 1967, according to Kuwaiti press accounts.

=== Early cultural presence ===
Because French was practically unknown in the Gulf in the 1970s, the first teaching structures were created within the French embassies in Kuwait and Qatar in response to demand for French courses. The Voltaire Institute, conceived in 1966, opened in September 1968 in a building in the garden of the French chancery in Kuwait for the purpose of teaching French. It was a private establishment under Kuwaiti sponsorship and Kuwaiti law, but its management was in practice entrusted to the embassy's cultural attaché; it had 360 members at its opening and 450 in 1981, about a third of them Kuwaitis. A 1973 file in the papers of the architect André Wogenscky refers to a cultural attaché at the French embassy in Kuwait. In 1979 the embassy's cultural service organised, at the request of and in collaboration with Kuwait University, the first French cultural week in the country.

In March 1984, a telegram concerning threats against the Kuwaiti ambassador in France was filed among the records of the French Ministry of the Interior's Directorate of Public Liberties and Legal Affairs, in a file covering the years 1984–1986.

=== Embassies terror attacks (1983) ===
On December 12, 1983, the French Embassy in Kuwait City was targeted alongside the U.S. Embassy in a coordinated series of six truck bombings by the pro-Iranian Shia militant group Al-Dawa. The blast breached the compound's perimeter wall, causing structural damage and lightly injuring five embassy employees, but resulted in no French fatalities. The attack was a direct reprisal for France's military and financial backing of Iraq during the Iran-Iraq War. The subsequent arrest of the attackers by Kuwaiti authorities prompted pro-Iranian factions to kidnap French and American citizens in Lebanon throughout the 1980s to demand their release.

=== Iraqi invasion and siege (1990) ===
Following the Iraqi invasion of Kuwait in August 1990, the embassy, like other foreign missions in occupied Kuwait, came under pressure from Iraqi forces. On 27 August 1990, France, in liaison with its European partners, decided to refer to the United Nations Security Council the worsening situation of the embassies in Kuwait, and asked for a United Nations mission to be sent to help restore the normal functioning of diplomatic missions and guarantee their inviolability. Foreign ministry spokesman Daniel Bernard said the situation was not easing: the chancery's water and electricity had been cut, and Iraqi troops had knocked down a small wall to get at its water supply. Around six diplomats remained and kept working. After weekend communication problems, Paris had relied on European Community embassies to stay in touch, and on 26 August it received a message from the chargé d'affaires, Jean-Pierre Galtier.

In retaliation for measures taken by France after the violation of its embassy in Kuwait, Iraq expelled eleven French diplomats from Baghdad; the expulsion was reported by Antenne 2 on 25 September 1990.

=== Reopening (1991) ===
Map showing the embassy of France (indicated with the letter C) in Kuwait City in 1991

After Kuwait's liberation, ambassador Jean Bressot presided over a brief flag-raising at the embassy entrance on 28 February 1991, when a soldier of a Commando de recherche et d'action dans la profondeur (CRAP) hoisted the tricolour. AFP noted that the flag on the roof had never been lowered by the Iraqis and had flown throughout the war. Men of the CRAP, led by Colonel Michel Monnier-Vinard of the Daguet Division staff, had just unlocked the embassy doors; they were part of a roughly 70-strong detachment that reached Kuwait City, about twenty of whom went to the embassy that morning.

=== Cultural and educational cooperation: L'Institut Français (2012— ) ===
The French Institute in Kuwait (Institut français du Koweït) was established on 1 January 2012 by merging three entities: the embassy's Department of Cooperation and Cultural Action, the Voltaire Institute and the Francophone community in Kuwait. The Institute works under the French ambassador's authority. Its linguistics department teaches French as a foreign language to children, teenagers and adults, a Campus France centre advises students planning to study in France, and its library holds over 7,000 items.

Logo of the Instituts Français

It also stages cultural events with local partners. The Ifpo study notes that, across the Gulf, the Institutes act as language and cultural centres in separate premises, while cooperation projects are managed by the cooperation departments inside the embassies. On 23 September 2026 the Institute launched a cultural season for the second half of 2026 to mark the 65th anniversary of relations.

=== Regional tensions and temporary closure (2026) ===
On 3 March 2026, the embassy announced a temporary closure to the public as a precautionary measure amid escalating regional tensions arising from the conflict between the United States and Israel on one side and Iran on the other. In a statement reported by the Kuwaiti newspaper Al-Jarida, it urged French citizens in Kuwait to follow the instructions of the local authorities and to limit unnecessary travel, and said it was monitoring developments in coordination with the Kuwaiti authorities and remained available for emergency communication. On 24 March 2026 the embassy announced the reopening of its visa section and the resumption of full consular services, including the visa application centre, following a temporary suspension; applicants were asked to begin their applications on the official French visa portal and to book appointments in advance.

=== Visit of Emmanuel Macron (2026) ===
In the weeks before the visit of President Emmanuel Macron organised in October 2026, the embassy reported meetings between ambassador Olivier Gauvin and Kuwaiti officials: the Minister of Communications and Information Technology, on digitalisation, the digital economy and artificial intelligence (5 October 2026), and the Minister-assistant for Strategic and Security Affairs (30 September 2026).

=== Archives ===
The embassy's own archives were entirely destroyed during the Iraqi invasion of Kuwait, so the post has no pre-1991 records; the surviving collection (reference 325PO, 154 items, 17 linear metres) begins in 1991, with only a few earlier documents dating back to 1969. It is held by the Ministry for Europe and Foreign Affairs' diplomatic archives centre in Nantes.

== List of ambassadors ==
From	To	Ambassador
1964	1968	Pierre-Louis Falaize (Note: Ambassador of France to Lebanon, accredited to Kuwait.)
1968	1975	Paul Carton (Note: Chargé d'affaires, then ambassador.)
1975	1979	José Paoli (Note: family relative of Patrice Paoli (1999-2002) below)
1979	1982	Pierre Blouin
1982	1986	Jean Bressot
1986	1988	Marcel Laugel
1988	1991	Jean Bellivier (Note: Jean-Pierre Galtier was chargé d'affaires at the embassy during the siege of August 1990.)
1991	1992	Jean Bressot (Note: Second term.)
1992	1997	Charles de Bancalis de Maurel d'Aragon
1997	1999	Jean Félix-Paganon
1999	2002	Patrice Paoli
2002	2005	Claude Losguardi
2005	2007	Corinne Breuzé
2007	2010	Jean-René Gehan
2010	2013	Nada Yafi
2013	2017	Christian Nakhlé
2017	2020	Marie Masdupuy
2020	2021	Anne-Claire Legendre
2021	2024	Claire Le Flécher
2024	present	Olivier Gauvin

== See also ==
- France–Kuwait relations
- Foreign relations of France
- List of diplomatic missions of France
