= Anne Osborn Krueger =

American economist

Anne Krueger
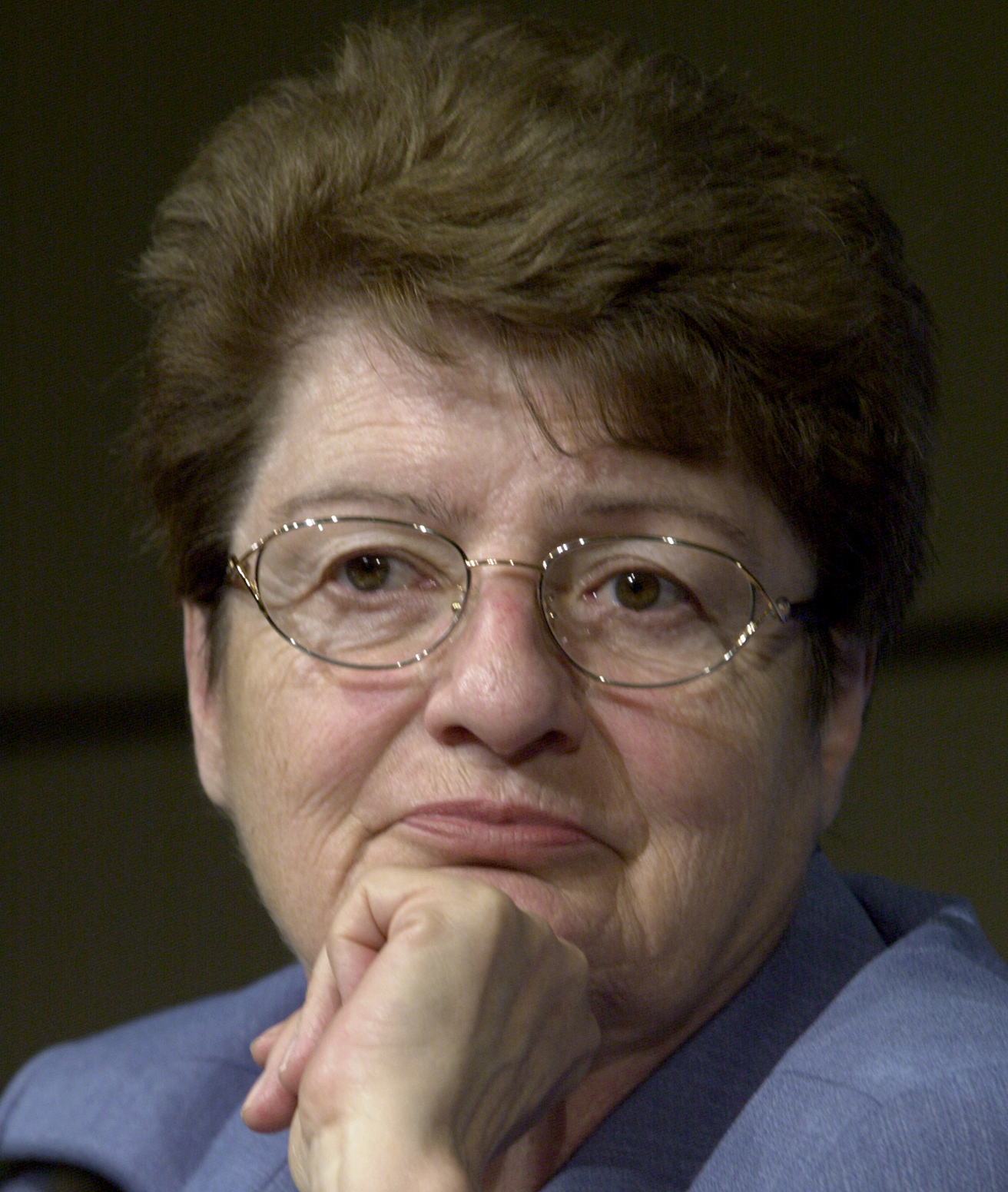
- Krueger in 2004

Acting Managing Director of the International Monetary Fund
- In office March 4, 2004 – June 7, 2004
- Preceded by: Horst Köhler
- Succeeded by: Rodrigo Rato

First Deputy Managing Director of the International Monetary Fund
- In office September 1, 2001 – August 31, 2006
- Preceded by: Stanley Fischer
- Succeeded by: John Lipsky

Chief Economist of the World Bank
- In office 1982–1986
- President: Alden W. Clausen
- Preceded by: Hollis Chenery
- Succeeded by: Stanley Fischer

Personal details
- Born: February 12, 1934 (age 92) Endicott, New York, U.S.
- Education: Oberlin College (BA); University of Wisconsin–Madison (PhD)

Academic background
- Doctoral advisor: James Earley

Academic work
- Institutions: Johns Hopkins University; Stanford University; Duke University; University of Minnesota
- Doctoral students: Zvi Eckstein

Anne Osborn Krueger (/ˈkruːɡər/; born February 12, 1934) is an American economist. She was the World Bank Chief Economist from 1982 to 1986, and the first deputy managing director of the International Monetary Fund (IMF) from 2001 to 2006. She is currently the senior research professor of international economics at the Johns Hopkins School of Advanced International Studies in Washington, D.C. She also is a senior fellow of Center for International Development (also was the founding Director) and the Herald L. and Caroline Ritch Emeritus Professor of Sciences and Humanities' Economics Department at Stanford University.

== Early life ==
Krueger was born on February 12, 1934, in Endicott, New York. She was one of eight siblings born to Australian parents who had moved to the United States; her father was a physician. Her uncles included Australian government minister Sir Reginald Wright and physiologist Sir Douglas Wright.

Krueger initially planned to pursue pre-law and attend law school, but during her undergraduate years she came to the crucial realization that “one had to understand economics in order to understand law and politics”. This very insight prompted her to declare economics as her major in her senior year. She received her undergraduate degree from Oberlin College in 1953. She received her Masters and Ph.D. in economics from the University of Wisconsin–Madison in 1956 and 1958 respectively.

== Professional career ==
As an economist, Krueger is known in macroeconomics and trade, famously popularising the term rent-seeking in a 1974 article. Furthermore, she has frequently criticised the U.S. sugar subsidies. She has published extensively on policy reform in developing countries, the role of multilateral institutions in the international economy, and the political economy of trade policy. In her 1996 Presidential address to the American Economic Association, she explored the lack of congruence between successful trade and development policies enacted worldwide and prevailing academic views.

She first started teaching at the University of Wisconsin as a teaching assistant in 1955 and then became an economics professor in 1958. She taught economics at the University of Minnesota from 1959 to 1982 before serving as World Bank Chief Economist from 1982 to 1986 where she was the Vice President of Economics and Research. Under her tenure as chief economist, the World Bank undertook very large multi-country comparative studies to understand the effects of trade.

After leaving the Bank, she taught at Duke University from 1987 to 1993, when she joined the faculty of Stanford University as Herald L. and Caroline L. Ritch Professor in Humanities and Sciences in the Department of Economics. She stayed at Stanford until 2001. She was also the founding director of Stanford's Center for Research on Economic Development and Policy Reform; and a senior fellow of the Hoover Institution.

She served as First Deputy Managing Director of the International Monetary Fund (IMF) from September 1, 2001, to August 31, 2006, serving as Acting Managing Director of the Fund on a temporary basis between March 4, 2004 (resignation of Horst Köhler), and June 7, 2004 (starting date for Rodrigo de Rato's mandate). Until the appointment of Christine Lagarde in 2011, she was the only female to fill the role of IMF Managing Director.

In 2005, she was awarded the prestigious title of Honorary Patron of the University Philosophical Society, Trinity College Dublin. In 2010, she was awarded an honorary doctorate from her alma mater, Oberlin College. Beginning in the spring of 2007, she assumed the position of professor of international economics at the Johns Hopkins School of Advanced International Studies in Washington, D.C.

She is a Distinguished Fellow and past president of the American Economic Association, a member of the National Academy of Sciences, the American Academy of Arts and Sciences, The Econometric Society, and The American Philosophical Society and a senior research fellow of the National Bureau of Economic Research. She is the recipient of a number of economic prizes and awards.

== Struggling with Success ==
The 1950s and the 1960s brought the neoclassical argument for open trade under attack because it had ignored (as Krueger quotes it) “dynamic considerations” and they stated that open trade was “static” (p. 51). Throughout the 1990s there was a general consensus that open trade was anything but static and the benefits were largely “dynamic” (p51).

In the book, Struggling with Success: Challenges Facing the International Economy (2012), Anne Krueger takes a defensive stance on globalization and the role it has played on improving the world and the lives of the people on it as a whole. She states that, “...globalization, has proceeded at a rapid pace since about 1800 and the degree of interdependence has greatly increased (p 24).” During the same time the industrial countries (whose economies were integrating) saw rapid growth in the quality of life for poor nations (p 24). Krueger's main focus is on the causes of the Asian “Tigers” growth, the rise of government regulation after and slightly before WWII and (regulations) inevitable fall, and how further deregulation improved the world economy.

Krueger places emphasis on the need to remove trade barriers and to deregulate domestic economies in the book Struggling with Success. Krueger says a lot of credit must be given to tools like “producer subsidy equivalent” in helping to remove trade barriers. “That tool permitted negotiations to begin restricting and dismantling agricultural protection (p 63).” These effective protection and cost benefit analysis gave politicians “empirical quantification, however rough, of their relevant magnitudes (p 63).” Krueger states that research results should be “observable, hopefully quantifiable, and recognizable by the policy maker (p 64).” The most prevalent danger for economists is for their theories to be misinterpreted by policy makers (p 64).

Ultimately, regulation has negative effects of the market in the country imposing the regulation and may have spillover effects on other countries trading with the nation imposing the regulations (p85). She points to the interest equalization tax that caused the move of financial capital from the New York to London, Sarbanes-Oxley caused corporate headquarters to be moved from the US, and anti-dumping duties caused the move of computer assembly firms (p85). She concludes here by saying that unprecedented economic growth from open trade regimes led to an increased appreciation of supply-side economics.

== Rent-Seeking ==
In 1974, Krueger wrote "The Political Economy of the Rent-Seeking Society" in which she popularized the term rent-seeking. Rent seeking occurs when interest groups lobby for government favors in the form of tariffs, patents, subsidies, import quotas, and other market regulations. In many cases, rent-seeking behavior can be unproductive because it manipulates the existing market, rather than creating new wealth. Krueger says rent-seeking behavior in the form of import restrictions carry the welfare costs of tariffs, as well as an additional welfare cost due to rent-seeking behavior. She also claims that rent-seeking behavior breeds more rent-seeking behavior by creating an economic environment where participating in rent-seeking is the only way to enter the market. In markets dominated by rent-seeking, new firms must dedicate their resources to rent-seeking rather than using their resources to develop technology.

Krueger’s empirical findings were groundbreaking. By examining the value of import licenses, price premiums on restricted goods, and resources devoted to obtaining government favors, Krueger calculated that competitive rent-seeking consumed 7.3% of India's national income in 1964 and 15% of Turkey's GNP in 1968. Whether through money spent lobbying, navigating bureaucracy, or maintaining political connections, individuals and firms diverted substantial resources from productive to unproductive activities. In Turkey, Krueger calculated that the value of import licenses was TL 1,404 million, nearly three times the CIF (Cost, Insurance, and Freight) value of the imported goods themselves, demonstrating how competitive rent-seeking dissipates real value. Her work challenged the prevailing wisdom that widespread government planning was necessary for economic development, showing instead that such policies created market failures that might worsen the problems they were meant to solve. In 2011, the American Economics Association named Krueger's article one of the twenty best articles in the first hundred years of the American Economic Review.

== Legacy ==
Anne Krueger's work laid the foundations for future theories of comparative development, most notably, Daron Acemoglu and James Robinson's 2012 book, "Why Nations Fail". The authors build a grand theory around concepts Krueger helped to pioneer. Acemoglu and Robinson's framework distinguishes between extractive and inclusive institutions, defining extractive economic institutions as those "designed to create and capture rents" that "solidify the political power of elites". This idea reinforces Krueger's empirical findings, further emphasizing the idea that government-created restrictions concentrate wealth among politically connected elites while imposing substantial indirect costs on society.

Contemporary debates about tech monopolies, pharmaceutical patents, occupational licensing, and financial sector rents all reflect Krueger's core insight: institutional design determines whether economic activity creates or extracts value. Her pioneering attempt to quantify rent-seeking inspired subsequent research on lobbying expenditures, corporate markups, and regulatory capture, though we still lack the comprehensive rent-extraction-to-GDP ratio she seems to have envisioned. Her work fundamentally transformed how economists understand the relationship between political institutions and economic development, providing the foundations for modern institutional and development economics.

== Editorship ==
- Reforming India's Economic, Financial and Fiscal Policies (2003, with Sajjid Z. Chinoy).
- Latin American Macroeconomic Reform: The Second Stage (2003, with Jose Antonio Gonzales, Vittorio Corbo, and Aaron Tornell).
- Economic Policy Reform and the Indian Economy (2003).
- A New Approach to Sovereign Debt Restructuring (2002).
- Economic Policy Reform: The Second Stage (2000).
- The WTO as an International Organization (2000).
- Krueger, Anne O (2012). Struggling with Success: Challenges Facing the International Economy. Hackensack, New Jersey: World Scientific. p. 400. ISBN 978-981-4374-32-3. Archived from the original on 2012-05-11.

Diplomatic posts
Preceded by Hollis Chenery	Chief Economist of the World Bank; 1982–1986	Succeeded by Stanley Fischer
Preceded by Stanley Fischer	First Deputy Managing Director of the International Monetary Fund; 2001–2006	Succeeded by John Lipsky
Preceded by Horst Köhler	Managing Director of the International Monetary Fund; Acting; 2004	Succeeded by Rodrigo Rato
