= Carlos Martens Bilongo =

French politician (born 1990)

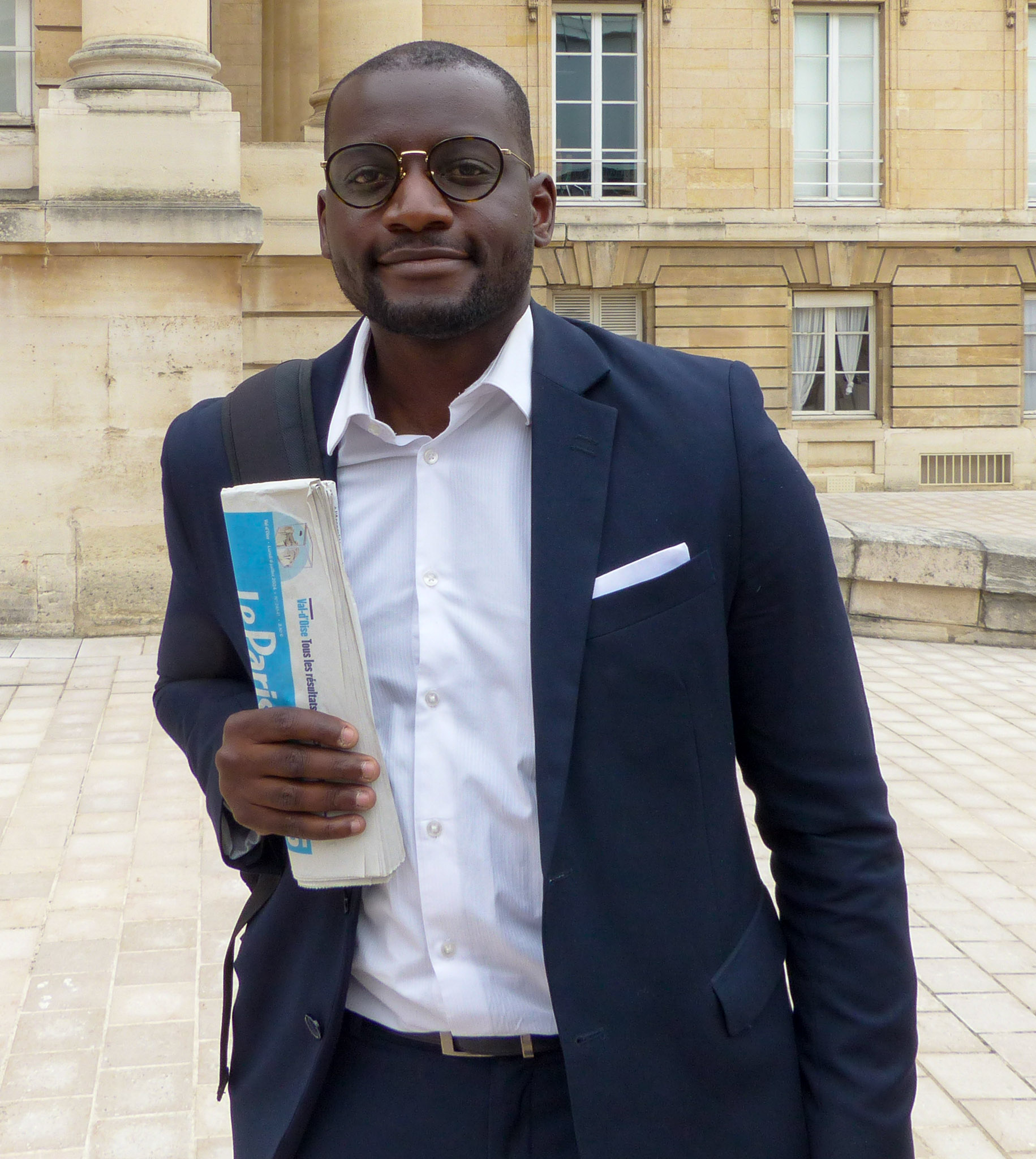
- Carlos Martens Bilongo in 2024

Member of the National Assembly for Val-d'Oise's 8th constituency
- Incumbent
- Assumed office 19 June 2022
- Preceded by: François Pupponi

Personal details
- Born: 31 December 1990 (age 35) Villiers-le-Bel, France
- Party: La France Insoumise

Carlos Martens Bilongo (born 31 December 1990) is a French teacher and politician who has represented the 8th constituency of the Val-d'Oise department in the National Assembly since 2022. A member of La France Insoumise (FI), he was elected under the New Ecological and Social People's Union (NUPES) alliance.

== Early life and career ==
Carlos Martens Bilongo was born on December 31, 1990, in Villiers-le-Bel to parents of Congolese (DRC) and Angolan origin. He is the youngest of six children.

After obtaining a vocational baccalaureate at the Gustave-Monod high school, Carlos Martens Bilongo joined Isifa plus values cfa Paris Sud, a business school in Paris, where he obtained a BTS Technico-commercial in 2012, before obtaining, a year later, a degree in Marketing Negotiation.

After an apprenticeship contract at Az Métal, he worked successively as a technical sales representative and then as a business manager, a position he held for six years. Since 2019, he has been a teacher in economics and law at the Alexandre-Dumas high school.

As a sports coach and physical trainer, he trains the singer Aya Nakamura during her tour.

== Political career ==
=== Activism ===
Martens Bilongo is involved in a member of the Triangle de Gonesse collective, a platform that brings together several associations committed to the environment. They have been fighting for several years to "save the fertile agricultural land" north of Paris.

=== French National Assembly ===
Carlos Martens Bilongo is a member of La France Insoumise. He was nominated by the NUPES in Villiers-le-Bel in the 8th constituency of Val-d'Oise, where he beat François Pupponi in the first round with more than 37% of the vote against 24%. During the inter-round, he received the support of the mayors of Sarcelles, Garges-lès-Gonesse and Villiers-le-Bel. On the second round, he was elected deputy with 61.72% of the vote.

On November 3, 2022, during a question session to the government at the National Assembly, while Deputy Bilongo was addressing the subject of the distribution of migrants sailing on the Ocean Viking, he was interrupted by the National Rally deputy Grégoire de Fournas, who said: "Let him go back to Africa", according to the version retained by the editors of the debates and available in the minutes of the session. These remarks provoked indignation in the Chamber and a temporary suspension of the sitting by Yaël Braun-Pivet, President of the Assembly.

Carlos Martens Bilongo filed a new complaint in October 2026 against unknown persons for, among other charges, "collusion with a foreign power," after being the subject of a 2023 report by Tracfin.
