= Benoît Jimenez =

French politician (born 1989)

Mayor of Garges-lès-Gonesse
- Incumbent
- Assumed office 4 July 2020
- Preceded by: Maurice Lefèvre

Personal details
- Born: 15 July 1989 (age 37)
- Party: La France Humaniste

Benoît Jimenez (born 15 July 1989) is a French politician serving as mayor of Garges-lès-Gonesse since 2020. He has served as president of La France Humaniste since 2025. He is a member of the Regional Council of Île-de-France, and serves as its special delegate for integration through sports. He is the vice president for employment, training, urban affairs and solidarity economy of Roissy Pays de France. In the 2012 legislative election, he was a candidate for the National Assembly in Val-d'Oise's 8th constituency.
