= Marie-Claude Beaudeau =

French politician

Senator in the Senate of France
- In office 12 June 1979 – 30 September 2004

Personal details
- Born: 30 October 1937 (age 87); Saint-Vincent-de-Connezac, France
- Political party: French Communist Party

Marie-Claude Beaudeau (née Rivière; born 30 October 1937) is a French politician and a member of the French Communist Party. She was senator for Val-d'Oise from 1979 to 2004.

== Biography ==
Beaudeau was born on 30 October 1937 in Saint-Vincent-de-Connezac in the department of Dordogne. Her parents are Pierre Rivière and Françoise Rivière (née Chauny). She worked as an executive secretary and married Emilien Beaudeau in 1956. She served as a municipal councillor of Sarcelles in 1972, the deputy mayor of Sarcelles from 1977 to 1983 and a departmental councillor for Val-d'Oise in the district of Sarcelles-Nord-Est in 1977. She was a member of the French Communist Party.

She first became a senator in the Senate for Val-d'Oise on 12 June 1979, replacing Fernand Chatelain who died. She was then elected on 28 September 1986 and re-elected on 24 September 1995. She was secretary of the Social Affairs Committee and vice-president of the Finance, Budgetary Control and National Economic Accounts Committee. She was a member of the Communist, Republican, Citizen and Ecologist group. She left office on 30 September 2004.

She is the president of the Beaugrenelle Defense Committee.
