= François Pupponi =

French politician

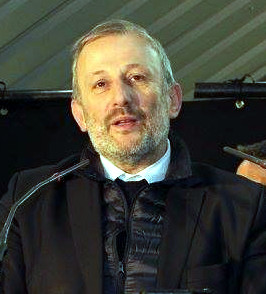
- François Pupponi in 2015

Mayor of Sarcelles
- In office 1997–2017
- Preceded by: Dominique Strauss-Kahn
- Succeeded by: Nicolas Maccioni

Member of the National Assembly for Val-d'Oise's 8th constituency
- In office 17 June 2007 – 21 June 2022
- Preceded by: Dominique Strauss-Kahn
- Succeeded by: Carlos Martens Bilongo

Personal details
- Born: 31 July 1962 (age 63) Nantua, France
- Party: Territories of Progress; Democratic Movement
- Other political affiliations: Socialist Party (2012–2020)

François Pupponi (born 31 July 1962) is a French politician. Born in Nantua in Eastern France, he is of Corsican descent. He has served as the mayor of Sarcelles between 1997 and 2017. He also serves as a member of the National Assembly, representing Val-d'Oise's 8th constituency.
