= John Lipsky =

American economist

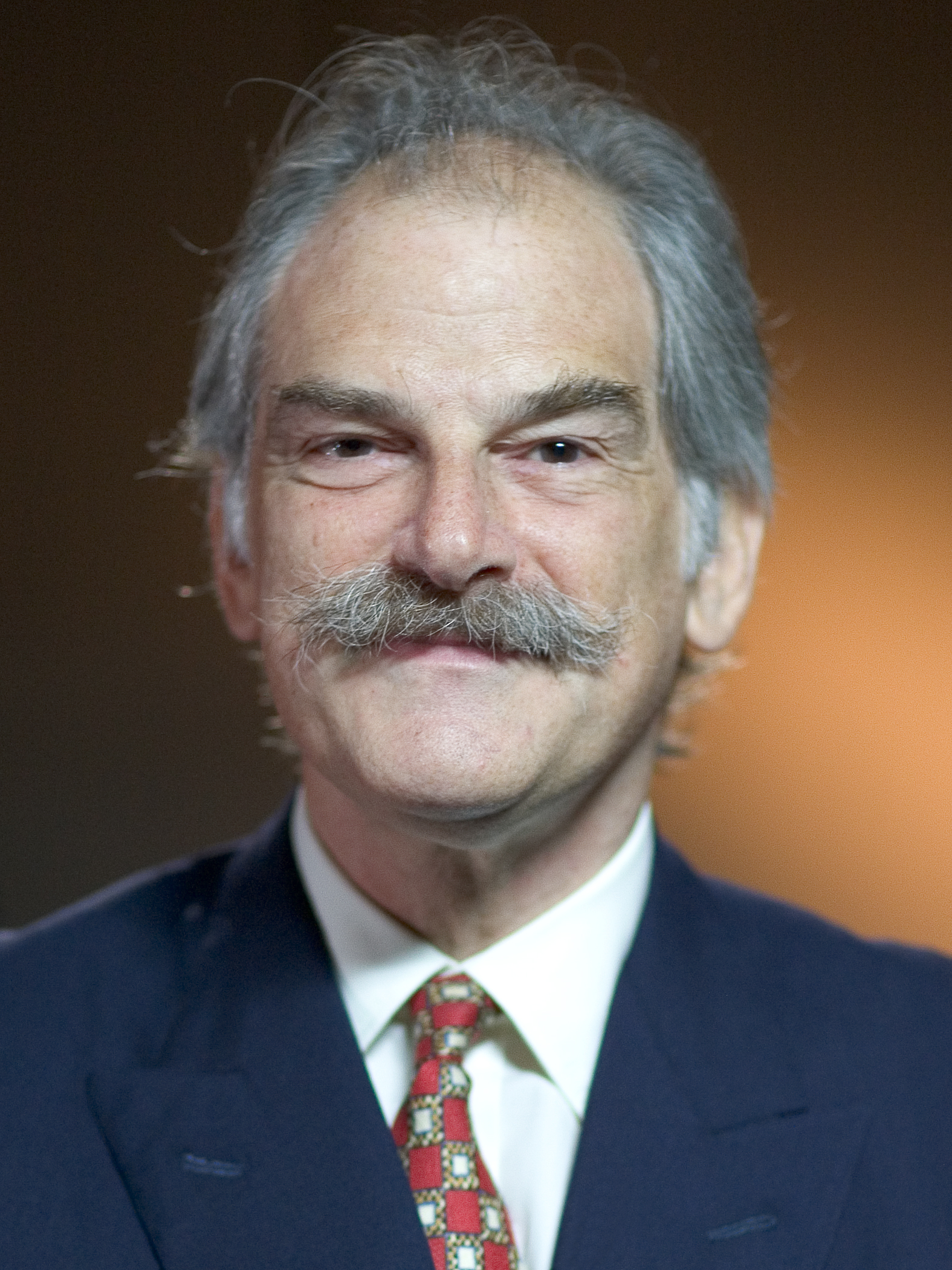
- Lipsky in 2010

Managing Director of the International Monetary Fund
- Acting
- In office May 15, 2011 – July 5, 2011
- Preceded by: Dominique Strauss-Kahn
- Succeeded by: Christine Lagarde

First Deputy Managing Director of the International Monetary Fund
- In office September 1, 2006 – September 1, 2011
- Director: Dominique Strauss-Kahn; Christine Lagarde
- Preceded by: Anne Osborn Krueger
- Succeeded by: David Lipton

Personal details
- Born: February 19, 1947 (age 78) Cedar Rapids, Iowa, U.S.
- Relations: Joan Lipsky (mother)
- Children: 3
- Education: Wesleyan University (BA); Stanford University (MA, PhD)

John Phillip Lipsky (born February 19, 1947) is an American economist. He was the acting managing director of the International Monetary Fund from May to July 2011. He assumed the post of acting managing director after Dominique Strauss-Kahn was arrested in May 2011 accused of sexual assault. After the appointment of Christine Lagarde he returned to his post as the first deputy managing director of the IMF. He retired from the IMF in November 2011 and is currently a distinguished visiting scholar at Johns Hopkins School of Advanced International Studies (SAIS).

== Family, early life and education ==
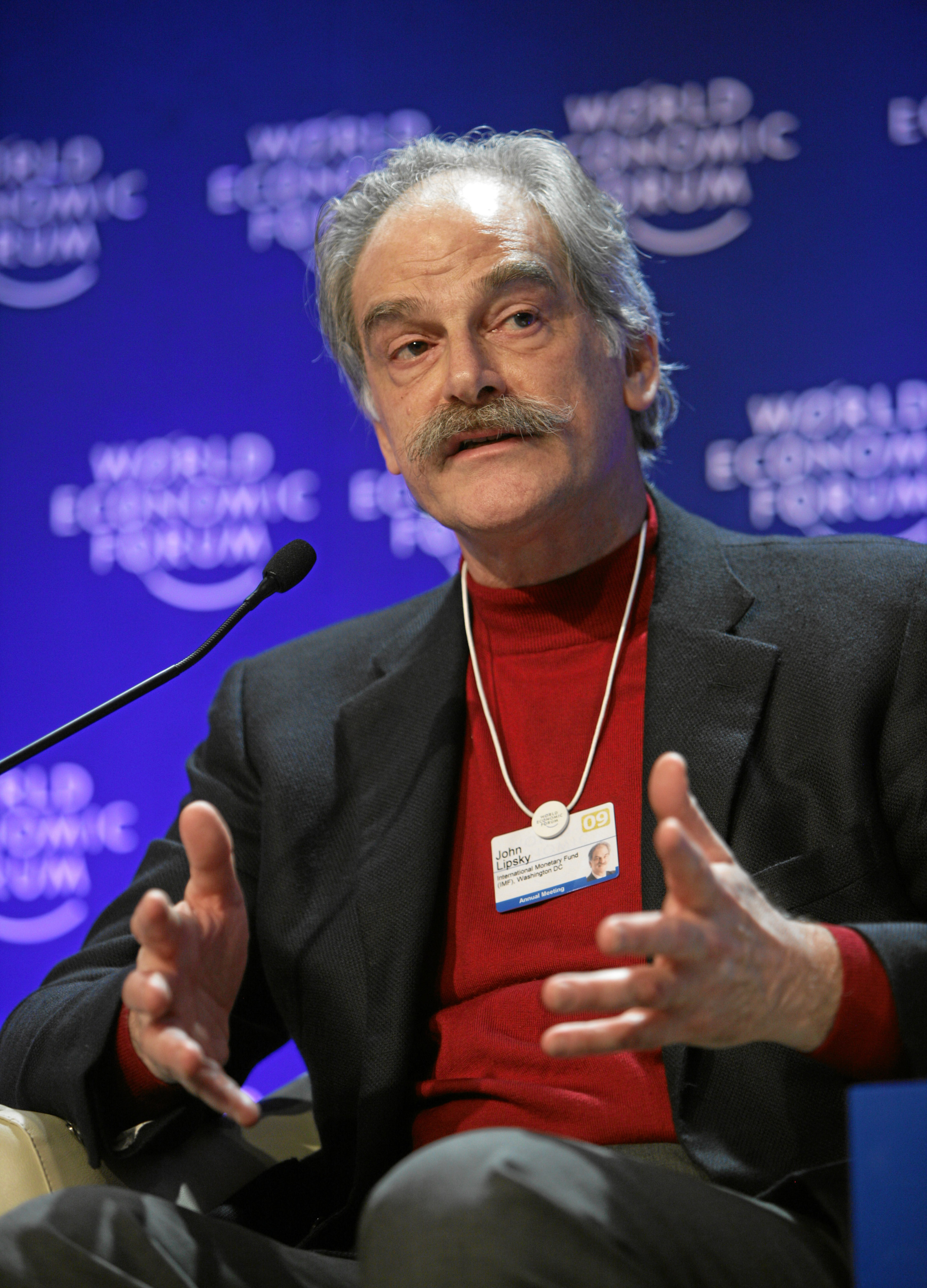
Lipsky during the WEF 2011

Lipsky was born into a Jewish family in Cedar Rapids, Iowa. Lipsky's great-grandfather, Henry Smulekoff, was a Ukrainian immigrant who opened a furniture store on Cedar Rapids' May's Island in 1890. Lipsky was the middle child of three born to Abbott and Joan Miller Lipsky. His late father was president of Smulekoff's, and sister Ann Lipsky is president today. His mother was a lawyer who served as a member of the Iowa House of Representatives and as the chair of the Iowa Council on Human Services. Early interest in Latin America was sparked by a family vacation in Mexico which led to a friendship, a summer in Guadalajara with the friend, and a summer for the friend in Iowa.

Lipsky attended Wesleyan University, earning a B.A. in economics. He then earned a M.A. and Ph.D. in economics from Stanford University.

== Career ==
On graduation from Stanford, Lipsky joined the International Monetary Fund, where he helped manage the Fund's exchange rate surveillance procedure. Appointed the IMF's resident representative in Chile from 1978 (during General Augusto Pinochet's military dictatorship), Lipsky returned, in 1980, to the IMF headquarters in Washington D.C. to develop the IMF's analysis of international capital markets. He also participated in negotiations with several member countries.

After 10 years at the IMF, in 1984 he joined Salomon Brothers in New York, working with Henry Kaufman. Based in London, England, from 1989, he was director of the bank's European Economic and Market Analysis Group. He returned to New York in 1994, when appointed the bank's chief economist and a managing director, with an office next to Henry Kaufman. In 1998 he joined JPMorgan as Chief Economist, and on that bank's merger with Chase Manhattan was appointed Chief Economist and Director of Research. He was then appointed to an operation role, becoming vice chairman of JPMorgan Investment Bank.

"In 2000, he chaired [an IMF] Financial Sector Review Group, established by former Managing Director Horst Köhler, to provide ... an independent perspective on [the Fund's] work on international financial markets." On September 1, 2006, he returned to the IMF as First Deputy Managing Director, succeeding the departing Anne Osborn Krueger. On May 12, 2011, Lipsky announced that he would leave his post at the end of his term on August 31, 2011, declining the option to serve for a second term. Three days later, on May 15, 2011, Lipsky was appointed acting managing director of the IMF, after managing director Dominique Strauss-Kahn's resignation due to being arrested on sexual assault charges.

Lipsky also serves on the board of directors of the National Bureau of Economic Research. His other professional activities have included serving on the board of directors of the American Council on Germany, the Japan Society, the advisory board of the Stanford Institute for Economic Policy Research, and the Council on Foreign Relations. On 27 February that year, it was announced that he was joining the board of HSBC

=== IMF leadership role ===
Lipsky's unplanned accession at the IMF led quickly to his immersion in addressing the European and Greek sovereign debt crises, a high-profile role his predecessor had been playing. At the 37th G8 summit held on 26–27 May 2011 in Deauville, France, Lipsky had to overcome Germany's reluctance to fund another round of bailouts for Greece. He did so by threatening to withhold IMF disbursements, an action that would precipitate a Greek default – an option none was ready to accept at that point. In the "bitter infighting," Lipsky was characterized in The Guardian as "less silky, much blunter" than Strauss-Kahn.

Lipsky retired from the IMF in 2011. He now teaches at the Johns Hopkins School of Advanced International Studies (SAIS).

Lipsky was credited with introducing Elizabeth Holmes of Theranos to the sometime chairman of Oracle, Donald Lucas. Lucas went on to serve as the chairman of the board of Theranos. http://digitalassets.lib.berkeley.edu/roho/ucb/text/lucas_don.pdf

== Personal life ==
Lipsky lives in Washington, D.C., and Brooklyn, New York.

Diplomatic posts
| Preceded by Anne Osborn Krueger | First Deputy Managing Director of the International Monetary Fund; 2006–2011 | Succeeded by David Lipton |
| Preceded by Dominique Strauss-Kahn | Managing Director of the International Monetary Fund; Acting; 2011 | Succeeded by Christine Lagarde |
