= La France Humaniste =

French political party founded in 2025

Humanist France La France Humaniste
- Abbreviation: LFH
- President: Benoît Jimenez
- Honorary president: Dominique de Villepin
- Director-general: Claire Le Flécher
- Founder: Dominique de Villepin
- Founded: 24 June 2025; 16 months ago (Note: Villepin announced the party in an interview with Le Parisien published on 23 June 2025; several outlets date the launch to 24 June 2025, when the announcement was reported.)
- Headquarters: Paris
- Youth wing: Forum Villepin
- Membership (2026): c. 50,000 (party claim) or 80,000 (September 2026)
- Ideology: Gaullism; Humanism; Republicanism; Souverainism
- Political position: Disputed (Note: The party describes itself as above the left–right divide; Radio France Internationale describes it as a "right-wing party" occupying the space of an independent Gaullist right, and the database Poligraph classifies it on the right.); Self-described: neither left nor right Media: Right
- Colours: Navy blue White
- National Assembly: 0 / 577
- Senate: 0 / 348
- European Parliament (French seats): 0 / 81
- Mayors: 13 / 34,965 (September 2026)
- Departmental councillors: 6 / 4,044 (September 2026)
- Overseas territorial assemblies (French Guiana, Mayotte): 2 (September 2026)
- Assembly of French Citizens Abroad: 1 / 90

Website
- lafrancehumaniste.fr

Humanist France (French: La France Humaniste, LFH) is a French political party founded in June 2025 by the former prime minister Dominique de Villepin, less than two years before the 2027 French presidential election. Chaired by Benoît Jimenez, mayor of Garges-lès-Gonesse, with Villepin as honorary president, the party presents itself as a free-to-join movement "for everyone", aimed at uniting the French "to defend social justice and the republican order" and at offering voters an alternative to what Villepin calls the "radicalism" of La France Insoumise (LFI) and the National Rally (RN).

The party is organised around a network of local "humanist circles" (cercles humanistes), of which it claimed more than 800 by mid-2026, and around a youth-oriented online community, the Forum Villepin. As of October 2026, Villepin had not formally declared his candidacy for the 2027 election, but the party was gathering the 500 sponsorships (parrainages) from elected officials required to run for President.

== History ==
=== Background ===
After serving as foreign minister, interior minister and then prime minister (2005–2007) under President Jacques Chirac. His opposition, as foreign minister, to the 2003 invasion of Iraq — expressed in a celebrated speech at the United Nations Security Council in February 2003 — remained central to his public image.

The party La France Humaniste has a precursor: in June 2010 Villepin launched Solidary Republic (République solidaire), presented at a rally in Paris's Halle Freyssinet attended by about 6,000 people. Its founder declared his candidacy for the 2012 presidential election in December 2011. Villepin attempted to run in the 2012 French presidential election but withdrew after failing to collect the 500 sponsorships needed to stand, and largely retreated from front-line politics.

From 2024–2025, Villepin regained media prominence through interventions on international affairs, in particular the war in Ukraine, the Gaza war and the second presidency of Donald Trump, in which he defended international law and criticised Western governments for ignoring a "spiral of violence" in Gaza. He lamented a world that had become more dangerous, "without rules, without international law, where the law of the jungle, the law of the strongest prevails". Polling at the time ranked him among the most popular political figures in France, with notable support among left-wing voters; a BVA poll indicated that he drew much of his support from La France Insoumise sympathisers, although other polls placed him lower in voting preferences. In 2025 he published Le Pouvoir de dire non (The Power to Say No, Flammarion), a title alluding to his 2003 "no" to the Iraq war, in which he prepared his return to politics.

In parallel, supporters organised an online pre-campaign. The "Forum Villepin" account, created in March 2025, promoted Villepin's international stature on social media, particularly among young people; by June 2025, Villepin's Instagram account had about 124,000 followers and was gaining nearly 15,000 a week.

=== Foundation (June 2025) ===
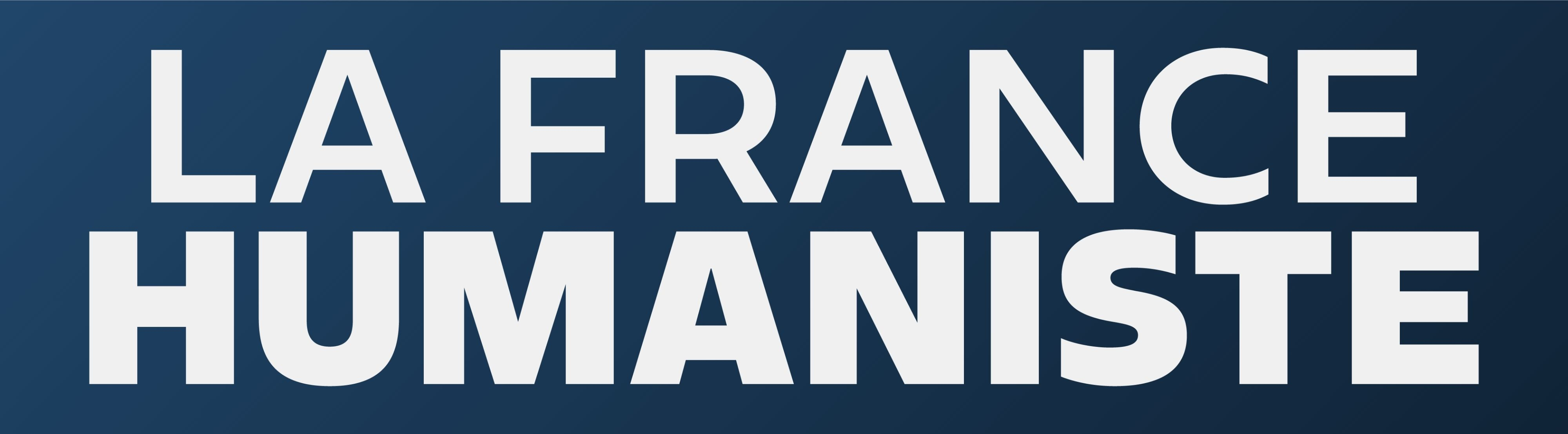
Former logo for the party

Villepin announced the creation of La France Humaniste in an interview with Le Parisien published on 23 June 2025. He described it as "a movement of ideas, of citizens, through the creation of a political party", open free of charge to people of all political backgrounds. Villepin took the title of honorary president, while the operational leadership was entrusted to Benoît Jimenez, mayor of Garges-lès-Gonesse. Explaining the move, Villepin said that "the French people deserve a real choice" and should not be forced to choose "between the radicalism of LFI and that of the RN", criticising parties that gave in to populism, "one-upmanship" and stigmatisation. He described the new organisation as a "party of balance" (parti d'équilibre) intended to counter the "logic of permanent one-upmanship" in French politics, and said that the movement already had "several dozen local committees" across France.

Asked about the 2027 presidential election, Villepin said that it was not yet time to "enter the presidential debate", without ruling out a candidacy, and expressed confidence that collecting the 500 sponsorships would this time "not be an obstacle". Commentators noted that the launch, two years before the election, moved him closer to a presidential bid.

The political scientist Alexandre Dézé lists LFH, alongside Édouard Philippe's Horizons and Xavier Bertrand's Nous France, among the parties created in France with a presidential vocation.

=== Development (2025–2026) ===
On 17 December 2025, Villepin inaugurated the party's premises in Paris and held its first meeting there. He claimed to have gathered "nearly 50,000 members who come from everywhere", many of them young people, and stated that "all [his] energy" was "focused on the goal of 2027", describing the National Rally as an "identity threat" (menace identitaire). On the same occasion he asserted that he had "never been on the right".

In January 2026, Villepin said he was already "on the ground" for 2027 and had begun collecting sponsorships, while ruling out any participation in a primary of the right. On 27 March 2026 the movement held a conference in the Richelieu amphitheatre of the Sorbonne, which drew about 1,500 people according to the organisers, counting those following in overflow rooms. The event was described by L'Humanité as having "the air of a presidential pre-rally", and it was attended among others by the rapper Fianso and the businessman Michel-Édouard Leclerc. The party then claimed 60,000 members and 700 circles, and said the Forum Villepin had 94,000 social media followers; it also mentioned an internal "conseil national humaniste et républicain" tasked with liaison with local elected officials. In April 2026, he claimed on BFMTV that La France Humaniste gathered 100,000 young people and was "today the leading youth movement in France".

In the March 2026 municipal elections, party president Benoît Jimenez was re-elected mayor of Garges-lès-Gonesse in the first round with 70.7% of the vote.

In spring 2026 the party's local network expanded through departmental committees and "humanist circles" (see below). In May 2026 the Journal du Dimanche reported that the party's website listed 908 circles in France and abroad, while anonymous members asserted that many of them were inactive "empty shells".

On 28 May 2026, during a visit to La Rochelle in front of several hundred party members, Villepin's entourage again claimed 50,000 members and said that 100 people had been tasked with collecting sponsorships — the shortfall that had ended his 2012 bid. On Franceinfo at the end of May 2026, asked whether he was on his way to the Élysée Palace, he answered "exactly". He continued a tour of France, visiting Saint-Étienne on 5 June 2026 for a "humanist café" with about fifty residents, where he said he wished to "weigh with all [his] weight" in the presidential campaign and to be part of the "final picture" of contenders from the end of the year, and Thorigny-sur-Marne on 8 June 2026, where more than 300 people attended a meeting of the Seine-et-Marne federation. On 4 July 2026 he took part in the Festival des Idées organised by former Socialist deputy Christian Paul at La Charité-sur-Loire, urging the French to "come together".

=== Pre-campaign for 2027 ===
While De Villepin was preparing for the launch of his party, in May 2025, an Ifop–Fiducial poll for Paris Match and Sud Radio placed Villepin first among French political figures, with 51% favourable opinions against 50% for Édouard Philippe; he had already topped the ranking in February and March. The survey covered 1,018 people representative of the French population aged 18 and over, with a margin of error of between 1.4 and 3.1 points. He was reported to enjoy 55% favourable opinions on the left, including 65% among La France Insoumise sympathisers, and 55% on the right, notably 70% among sympathisers of The Republicans, his former political family.

In July 2026, as the La France Humaniste is running for over a year, the AFP reported that Villepin, then credited with around 3% of voting intentions, had about 200 promises of sponsorship, and that he hoped to attract centrists, moderate left-wing voters and ecologists rather than declare early. On 30 August 2026, he told BFMTV that he would confirm his candidacy "once the election campaign has begun", and again rejected primaries as "the latest gimmick for the desperate". In the September 2026 Ifop–Fiducial poll for Paris Match and Sud Radio, conducted by telephone on 2–3 September among 1,034 people using the quota method, Villepin ranked second out of all the personalities surveyed with 47% favourable opinions (up one point from July 2026), behind only the businessman Michel-Édouard Leclerc (54%) and ahead of Christine Lagarde (46%). This made him the highest-ranked politician in the survey, having risen from sixth place in July; his favourable opinions reached 82% among Renaissance sympathisers and 35% among La France Insoumise sympathisers.

In September 2026, La Lettre reported that Claire Le Flécher, former French ambassador to Kuwait, was to take the head of La France Humaniste as director-general, and that the movement had won supporters among former allies of Benoît Hamon, such as Guillaume Balas and Olivier Girardin. On 17 September 2026, L'Opinion published an appeal led by Benoît Jimenez and signed by some twenty mayors and local councillors, calling on Villepin to stand: "This path, Dominique de Villepin proposes it, and that is why we call on him to run for the presidential election." The newspaper presented the appeal as a way to dispel doubts about Villepin's ability to secure the 500 sponsorships. At the end of September 2026, the movement presented a "France 2027" project, which commentators noted did not yet amount to an official candidacy.

In October 2026, the party's representative in the Tarn claimed that between 200 and 300 of the required 500 sponsorships had been secured, insisting that Villepin "will not back out".

== Ideology and positions ==
La France Humaniste claims to transcend the traditional left–right divide and to offer an option to counter the growing polarisation of French politics; its two founding "promises" are "social justice" and "republican order". Villepin has defined himself as "French, republican", rejecting the left/right question by asking whether it had been put to Jean Moulin in 1943, and has described his line as "eco-Gaullist and Gaullist, period", arguing that the country must be "sovereign" to think about its future. Party officials describe themselves as Gaullist "but not right-wing", while the Seine-et-Marne co-coordinator presented Villepin as embodying "social Gaullism, firmness and mutual aid without welfarism".

The party's appeal of September 2026 summarises its programme around "the Republic and the authority of the rule, social justice, freedom, responsibility [and] the general interest", calling for a France that "protects without closing itself off", "asserts its sovereignty and carries weight in Europe", and applies "the common rule everywhere". Other recurring themes include:

- Opposition to the far right: Villepin presents the National Rally as an "identity threat" that would lead to "a regime that differentiates between the French", and local officials reject "national preference".
- Institutions: Villepin advocates moving away from "presidential verticality" so that the president recovers his role as "arbiter and guarantor of the continuity of the State".
- Economy and taxation: he has floated a reworked wealth tax and the reintroduction of a carbon tax, and called the "quoi qu'il en coûte" ("whatever it costs") policy "of rare stupidity" during the autumn 2026 social crisis. His visit to Saint-Étienne was intended to highlight deindustrialisation.
- Foreign policy: the party's discourse emphasises Villepin's diplomatic stature, his defence of international law and multilateralism, and his opposition to the Iraq war.
- Technology: Villepin has argued that "the question is no longer for or against AI" and has called for an "AI for the common good".
- Method: in June 2026 he proposed governing France "as Luis Enrique coaches PSG", by "playing as a team" and "breaking habits".

== Organisation ==
=== Leadership ===
Leadership of La France humaniste
Office	Holder	Since	Ref.
Founder and honorary president	Dominique de Villepin	June 2025	
President	Benoît Jimenez (mayor of Garges-lès-Gonesse)	June 2025	
Director-general	Claire Le Flécher (former ambassador to Kuwait)	September 2026	

=== Legal structure and statutes ===
La France Humaniste is constituted as an association under the 1901 law and describes itself in its statutes as a political group subject to the 1988 law on the financial transparency of political life. It is run by a board of at least three members and a bureau comprising at least the president, the treasurer and the honorary president; the president is elected for two years by the bureau. Membership is individual and belonging to another party is not incompatible with it; the bureau may refuse members whose public positions are manifestly incompatible with the movement's values. The annual membership fee was set at zero euros by a general assembly held on 23 June 2025. The statutes list as resources membership fees, contributions from elected members based on their allowances, donations from individuals collected through a financing association or financial agent, and transfers from partner political associations; the party may not receive funds from foreign states or foreign legal entities, nor from legal persons other than political parties. Its internal rules require written mandates for spokespeople, oblige members to declare interests linked to foreign entities, and set up a disciplinary system with mediators and an investigation unit.

=== Membership ===
Membership of La France Humaniste is free. The party claimed nearly 50,000 members in December 2025, a figure repeated in May 2026. These are the party's own figures, and the extent of its activity on the ground has been questioned (see below). In April 2026 Villepin also claimed 100,000 young supporters, and in June 2026 the party presented the Forum Villepin as gathering more than 102,000 young people across the country and on social media.

=== Humanist circles and local committees ===
The basic unit of the party is the "humanist circle" (cercle humaniste), a local group of up to about twenty people tasked with carrying out grassroots militant actions, relaying national messages and passing proposals up to the party's bodies. Circles organise "humanist cafés" (cafés humanistes), door-to-door canvassing and solidarity actions; supporters present the movement as being "without chiefs, without internal wars". Circles are coordinated by departmental committees and correspondents. More than 800 circles had been created by June 2026, according to the party, and its website listed 908 in France and abroad in May 2026.

Each circle is capped at twenty members and the structure has three tiers: circle, department and national coordination. Circles are meant to serve as an entry point for newcomers, through open events, canvassing and solidarity actions.

Selected departmental structures
Department	Launched	Local leaders	Notes	Ref.
Gard (30)	April 2026	Alain Picasso (departmental referent); Halim Belhaj (Cercle Nîmes République)	First meeting on 15 April 2026 with about twenty participants; three circles in Nîmes by June 2026	
Réunion (974)	April 2026	Imrhane Moullan (departmental referent)	Call to create circles across the island	
Indre-et-Loire (37)	May 2026	Alain Dayan, Florie-Laure Caudron (co-coordinators)	200 members claimed; about ten sponsorship promises in September 2026	
Seine-et-Marne (77)	c. March 2026	Steeve Boumbou-Liotta, Bouchra Fenzar-Rizki (co-coordinators)	Nearly 800 members claimed in June 2026	
Somme (80)	8 June 2026	Carl Wozniczka-Brousse (correspondent)	Departmental support committee	
Savoie and Haute-Savoie (73–74)	June 2026	Sylvain Arenal (correspondent)	About 700 people mobilised, according to the party	
Haute-Saône (70)	June 2026	Anthony Louise (organiser, Vesoul)	Local group	
Loir-et-Cher (41)	July 2026	Gildas Vieira, Ginette Guy-Serraire	Humanist circle in Blois	
Cher (18)	c. June 2026	Abdel Khechim (referent)	First humanist café in Bourges in September 2026	
Isère (38)	September 2026	Rosa Belaïdi (correspondent)	Opposition municipal councillor in Bourgoin-Jallieu	
Tarn (81)	October 2026	Philippe Colombani (chair, former diplomat)	About 100 members; 17-member committee; five circles (Albi, Castres, Gaillac, Graulhet, Lavaur)	

=== Forum Villepin ===
The Forum Villepin, active on social media since March 2025, describes itself as the youth section of La France humaniste; its president, Jules Faure de Fallois, confirmed in September 2026 that it was attached to Villepin's campaign while stating that its posts were "not coordinated" with Villepin, who left it "great freedom". Its content, which includes AI-generated videos featuring Villepin alongside Jacques Chirac, has gone viral and drawn criticism over the use of the late president's image. Commenting on an AI-generated rap clip in October 2026, Villepin said it showed "an expectation among young people of another way of talking about politics".

== Elected officials ==
As of September 2026, the party's elected officials included the following, all of whom signed the appeal calling on Villepin to stand, led by party president Benoît Jimenez and published in L'Opinion on 17 September 2026. (Note: L'Opinion presents the list as the signatories of the appeal and describes them as coming from "all the republican, humanist and democratic political families"; it does not state the party membership of each signatory.)

Elected officials (September 2026)
Name	Office	Commune / body	Department / territory
Benoît Jimenez	Mayor; president of La France humaniste	Garges-lès-Gonesse	Val-d'Oise
Hamid Chabani	Departmental councillor	Departmental Council	Seine-Saint-Denis
Miltiade Constantakatos	Mayor	Frais	Territoire de Belfort
Majdoline El Abidi	Departmental councillor	Departmental Council	Seine-et-Marne
Bouchra Fenzar-Rizki	Mayor; vice-president of the Departmental Council	Thorigny-sur-Marne	Seine-et-Marne
Jérôme François	Mayor	Mériel	Val-d'Oise
François Ginestet	Mayor	Jaunac	Ardèche
Olivier Girardin	Mayor	La Chapelle-Saint-Luc	Aube
Pascal Gouhoury	Mayor; president of the Communauté d'agglomération du Pays de Fontainebleau	Samoreau	Seine-et-Marne
Jean-Bernard Soudan	Mayor	Armentières-en-Brie	Seine-et-Marne
Djamila Haddad	Departmental councillor	Departmental Council	Aube
Jean-Louis Klipfel	Mayor	Laubach	Bas-Rhin
Olivier Bova	Mayor	Mont-Saint-Martin	Meurthe-et-Moselle
Denise Leiboff	Mayor; president of the Fédération nationale des communes pastorales	Lieuche	Alpes-Maritimes
Farid Mebarki	Mayor	La Chapelle-Gauthier	Seine-et-Marne
Ali Omar	Vice-president	Assembly of Mayotte	Mayotte
Aziza Philippon	Departmental councillor	Departmental Council	Val-d'Oise
Emmanuel Prince	Vice-president	Assembly of French Guiana	French Guiana
Hugues Toussay	Mayor	Le Diamant	Martinique
Ramzi Zinaoui	Departmental councillor	Departmental Council	Val-d'Oise
Ghassan Ayoub	Councillor	Assembly of French Citizens Abroad	Central Asia and Middle East constituency

In total, the list comprises 21 elected officials: 13 mayors (one of them also a departmental vice-president and another the president of an agglomeration community), five further departmental councillors, two vice-presidents of overseas territorial assemblies and one member of the Assembly of French Citizens Abroad. As of October 2026, the party had no members in the National Assembly, the Senate or the European Parliament. Other local elected officials have joined its departmental structures, including two deputy mayors of Albi, Mathieu Vidal and Jean-Michel Bouat.

== Reception and analysis ==
In his study of the alleged decline of political parties, Alexandre Dézé cites La France humaniste, alongside Horizons (October 2021) and Nous France (October 2022), as an example of parties created "with a presidential vocation", noting that all candidates in the 2012, 2017 and 2022 presidential elections belonged to parties despite "the sometimes instrumental character of their creation".

The website VL Média compared its strategy of going beyond the left–right cleavage with that of Emmanuel Macron's La République En Marche; L'Humanité asked whether "villepinism" was "another Macronism". AFP reported that a Macronist minister described Villepin as an "inverted Fabien Roussel" — a right-wing figure liked by the left — and raised concerns about his paid activities abroad, including in China, which he has denied constitute any conflict of interest.

The party's claimed numbers have been questioned: in May 2026, anonymous members told the Journal du Dimanche that many of the circles shown on the party's map were inactive, and the weekly reported that Villepin was struggling to rally prominent supporters. Some attendees at his public meetings regretted the lack of concrete proposals, and the commentator Zohra Bitan dismissed his "Luis Enrique method" as "hollow". Polls in 2026 credited Villepin with between about 2.5% and 6% of voting intentions.

== See also ==
- Dominique de Villepin
- Gaullism
- 2027 French presidential election
- List of political parties in France
