= Embassy of the United States, Kuwait City =

- Location: Kuwait City, Kuwait
- Address: Plot No.14, Block 6, Masjed Al-Aqsa Street Masjid Al Aqsa Street، Kuwait
- Coordinates: 29°17′31″N 48°2′49″E
- Website: https://kw.usembassy.gov

The Embassy of the United States in Kuwait City is the diplomatic mission of the United States of America in Kuwait.

== History ==
Diplomatic relations between the United States and Kuwait were established on September 22, 1961, following Kuwait's full independence from the United Kingdom. The U.S. opened its first consulate in Kuwait on June 27, 1951, and began operating publicly on October 15 of the same year with Enoch Duncan as the U.S. Consul. On December 11 and 27, 1960, a bilateral agreement with Kuwait on non-immigrant passport visas was concluded, underscoring the recognition of Kuwait as a sovereign state.

=== 1983 Attacks ===
On 12 December 1983, a truck laden with 45 large cylinders of gas connected to plastic explosives broke through the front gates of the American Embassy in Kuwait City and rammed into the embassy's three-story administrative annex, demolishing half the structure. The shock blew out windows and doors in distant homes and shops. A State department spokesman initially declared that damage at the embassy was extensive, and that non-American embassy workers were among the dead and the wounded. According to the US State Department, the attack on the US embassy in Kuwait City led to a "comprehensive review of overseas security and the Department’s establishment of the Bureau of Diplomatic Security (DS) on November 4, 1985".

=== 1990 Iraqi invasion ===
On August 2, 1990, Iraq invaded Kuwait. Initially, US diplomats were not to evacuate to publicly defy Iraq's invasion of the country. The decision was later reversed after Iraq freed approximately 750 US citizens held in Iraq and Kuwait, which allowed American Ambassador W. Nathaniel Howell and embassy staff to leave Kuwait on December 13, 1990, after 110 days spent in the embassy without power and with scarce rations. The United States, alongside a multinational coalition, expelled Iraqi forces from Kuwait in 1991.

Map of 1991 Kuwait City with the locations of the Embassies of the UK (A), the USA (B), and France (C)

The embassy reopened on March 1, 1991, following the liberation of Kuwait. Since then, Kuwait has served as an important platform for U.S. and coalition operations, particularly during the Iraq War starting in 2003, and played a crucial role during the withdrawal of U.S. combat troops and equipment from Iraq in 2011.

=== 2026 drone attacks from Iran ===
On 2 March 2026, the embassy was hit by drones or by an Iranian missile strike during Iran's retaliatory attacks during the 2026 Iran war, prompting US Secretary of State Marco Rubio to close the embassy until further notice.

== See also ==
- Embassy of Kuwait, Washington, D.C.
- Kuwait–United States relations
- List of ambassadors of the United States to Kuwait
