= Joan Miller Lipsky =

American politician (1919–2015)

Member of the Iowa House of Representatives
- In office 1967–1979

Personal details
- Born: April 9, 1919 Cedar Rapids, Iowa, U.S.
- Died: August 18, 2015 (aged 96) Cedar Rapids, Iowa, U.S.
- Party: Republican
- Children: 3, including John
- Education: Northwestern University (BS); University of Iowa (JD)

Joan Miller Lipsky (April 9, 1919 – August 18, 2015) was an American attorney and politician who served as a member of the Iowa House of Representatives from 1967 to 1979.

== Early life and education ==
Lipsky was born in Cedar Rapids, Iowa. After graduating from the Gulf Park Academy for Women in Mississippi, she earned a Bachelor of Science degree in psychology from Northwestern University.

== Career ==
Lipsky attended graduate school at the University of Iowa. She was a staff psychologist at the University of Chicago Medical Center.

She served in the Iowa House of Representatives from 1967 to 1979 as a Republican. During her final term in the House, Lipsky began attending the University of Iowa College of Law. She earned her Juris Doctor in 1980 and began practicing law in Cedar Rapids. Lipsky was a Republican candidate for lieutenant governor during the 1986 Iowa gubernatorial election.

== Personal life ==
She was married to Abbott Bennett Lipsky until his death in 2008. They had three children, including John Lipsky, an economist who served as the acting managing director of the International Monetary Fund. During her retirement, Lipsky split her time between Cedar Rapids and Sarasota, Florida. She died in 2015.
