= André Masson (economist) =

French economist

André Masson (French pronunciation: [ɑ̃dʁe masɔ̃]; born 21 May 1950) is a French economist. His positions include director of research at CNRS and director of studies at School for Advanced Studies in the Social Sciences.
