= Saint-Vincent-de-Connezac =

- Commune
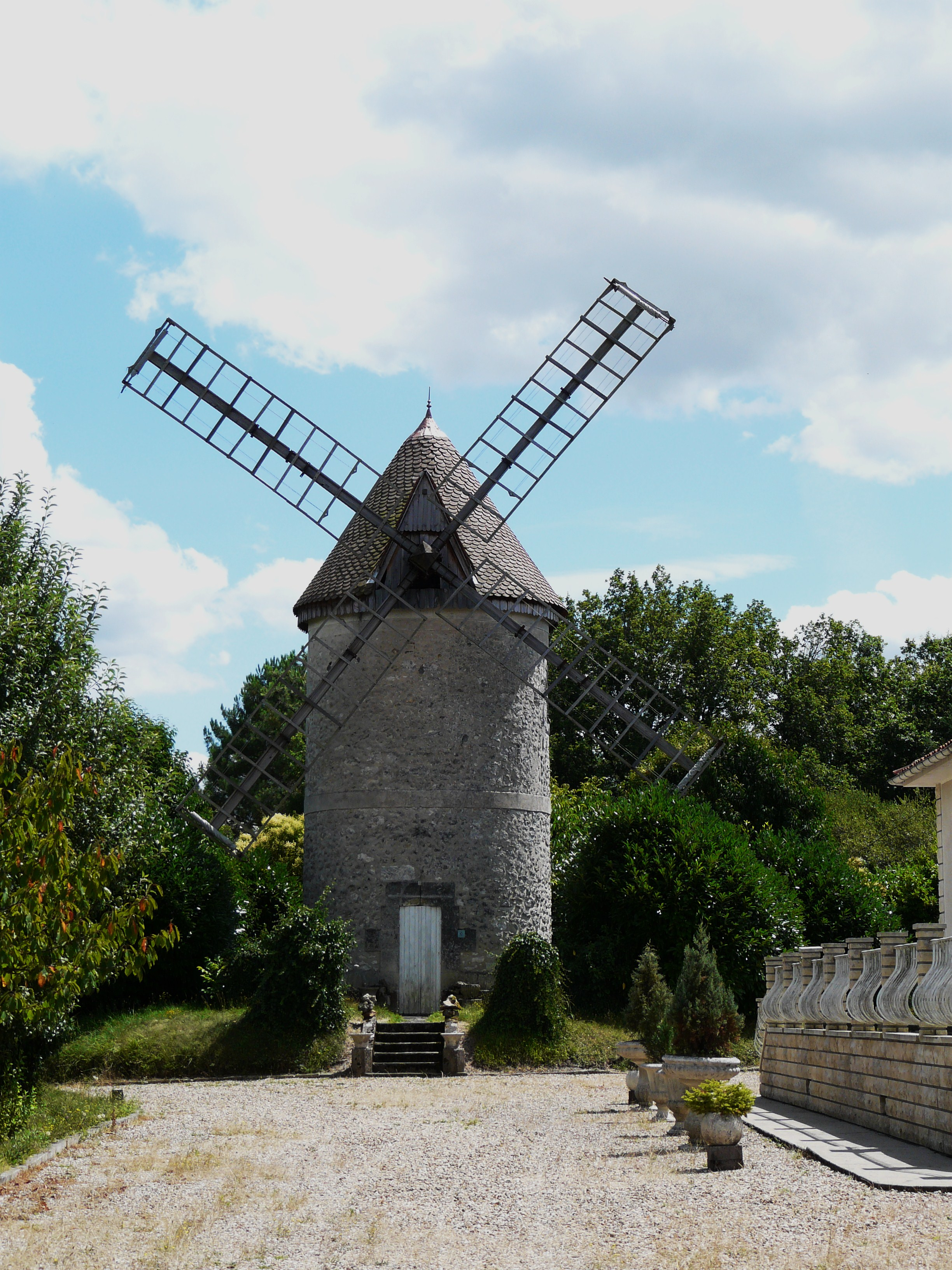
- The windmill in Saint-Vincent-de-Connezac

- Coat of arms
- Location of Saint-Vincent-de-Connezac
- Location within France Location within Nouvelle-Aquitaine
- Coordinates: 45°09′53″N 0°23′54″E
- Country: France
- Region: Nouvelle-Aquitaine
- Department: Dordogne
- Arrondissement: Périgueux
- Canton: Ribérac

Government
  - Mayor (2020–2026): Jean-Claude Arnaud
- Area^{1}: 14.81 km^{2} (5.72 sq mi)
- Elevation: 106 m (348 ft)
- Highest elevation: 210 m (690 ft)
- Lowest elevation: 90 m (300 ft)
- Population (2023): 664
  - Density: 44.8/km^{2} (116/sq mi)
- Time zone: UTC+01:00 (CET)
  - Summer (DST): UTC+02:00 (CEST)
- INSEE/Postal code: 24509 /24190
- ^{1} French Land Register data, which excludes lakes, ponds, glaciers > 1 km^{2} (0.386 sq mi or 247 acres) and river estuaries.

Saint-Vincent-de-Connezac (French pronunciation: [sɛ̃ vɛ̃sɑ̃ də kɔnzak]; Limousin: Sent Vincenç de Conasac) is a commune in the Dordogne department in Nouvelle-Aquitaine in southwestern France.

== Population ==
Historical population
Year	Pop.	±% p.a.
1968	546	—
1975	511	−0.94%
1982	432	−2.37%
1990	403	−0.86%
1999	439	+0.96%
2007	519	+2.11%
2012	605	+3.11%
2017	662	+1.82%
2023	664	+0.05%
Source: INSEE

== See also ==
- Communes of the Dordogne department
