= Compagnie française des expositions =

French company

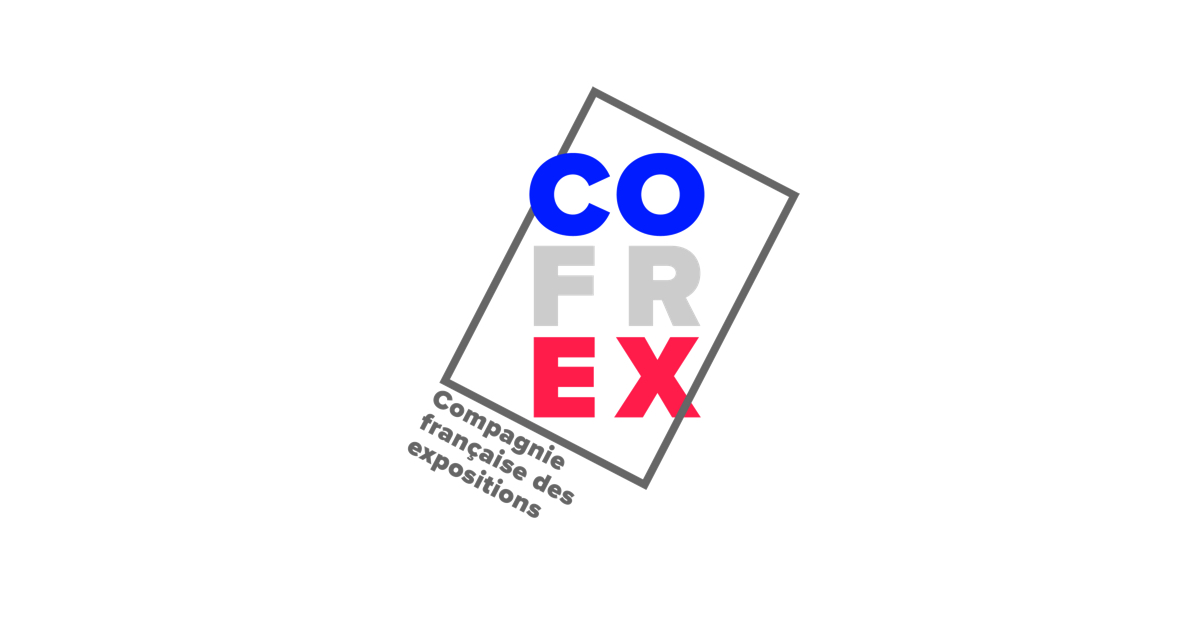
- Abbreviation: Cofrex
- Established: 17 January 2018; 7 years ago
- Type: SAS (the Slate is the sole shareholder)
- Headquarters: 77 boulevard Saint-Jacques, 75014 Paris, France
- President: Erik Linquier
- Website: www.cofrex.fr

The Compagnie française des expositions (French pronunciation: [kɔ̃paɲi fʁɑ̃sɛːz dez‿ɛkspozisjɔ̃]; "French Exhibition Company"), founded on 17 January 2018 by decree of the State, is the official French company responsible for organizing and promoting France's participation in World Expos and Specialised Expos.

== History ==
Before the Compagnie française des expositions (Cofrex) was established, France's participation in World Expos and Specialised Expos was organized by different entities for each event, who were selected following a public call for tenders.

Cofrex was created with the aim of ensuring long-term development and continuity for these events. It is a sustainable project that uses experience of previous exhibitions in order to organize France's future participation in World Expos and Specialised Expos in the best possible way, for the general public as well as for the sponsors.

== World Expos ==
The first World Expos were held in London in 1851, and then in France in 1853. Since 1931, the World Expos have been governed and overseen by BIE (Bureau of International Expositions). BIE is an intergovernmental organization in charge of regulating these global events and ensuring that they are successful.

=== World Expo 2020 in Dubai ===
The Expo 2020 will be held in Dubai (United Arab Emirates) from 20 October 2020 until 10 April 2021. The theme of the expo is “Connecting Minds, Creating the future”, which is then divided into three sub-themes: Mobility, Durability, Opportunity. This is the first edition that Cofrex is overseeing as France's official organizer.

With 25 million visits expected by the Expo 2020 organizers, tickets should go on sale in October 2019.

==== France's participation ====
At the unveiling of the Louvre Abu Dhabi which took place on 8 and 9 November 2017, Emmanuel Macron, the President of France, officially announced France's participation in the Expo 2020 in Dubai. He also revealed that the theme selected for France would be “Mobility”, a key topic for French technology and innovation. On 9 November, together with His Highness Mohammed bin Rashid Al Maktoum, he attended the signing of the contract for France's participation to the Expo 2020 by Reem Al Hashimi, the Minister for International Cooperation, and Erik Linquier, the President of Cofrex and France's Commissioner General for Expo 2020 Dubai.

Located in the heart of the Expo 2020 in Dubai South, the French Pavilion Dubai 2020 was designed with a special theme: “Light, Enlightenment”. It is a dual reference to the humanist century (Enlightenment) and also evokes movement (the speed of light):

- Light as a philosophy: the light as a tool, which illuminates and reveals and facilitates vision and progress.
- Light as a source of warmth and creativity: palpable light that generates warmth and is a source of innovation.
- Light as a medium of connectivity: light that connects, transports and transmits data.

==== The French Pavilion official film ====
The French Pavilion official film was produced by Sonia Rolland, artistic director and former Miss France 2000.

==== Pavilion design ====
The architecture, design and architects for the French Pavilion were selected following a public call for tenders in 2018. The Pavilion was officially unveiled on 19 March 2019 during a lecture at the Ministry for Ecological and Inclusive Transition, which was attended by Brune Poirson, Secretary of State to the Minister for Ecological and Inclusive Transition. “The Expo 2020 Dubai will be an important opportunity to demonstrate that the choices we have made in support of ecological and inclusive transition represent solutions for the future,” said the Secretary of State.

The French Pavilion was designed by two architecture firms: Atelier du Prado and Celnikier & Grabli Architectes, and, more specifically, by Jean-Luc Perez from l'Atelier du Prado and Jacob Celnikier and Pascal Grabli from CGA. A scenographer was also appointed to work on the design of the French Pavilion in accordance with the “Light, Enlightenment” theme. The person chosen was Jean-Marie Priol, artistic director of the Immersive(s) group.

The French Pavilion boasts an impeccable environmental record. Cofrex has presented a sustainable and responsible building, which is 80% self-sufficient in terms of energy. Photovoltaic panels will be installed on the Pavilion to produce solar energy. The French Pavilion can be completely dismantled, and it can therefore be re-used after the Expo 2020. It will also be equipped with a purification microstation. Protecting local biodiversity is also one of the objectives, which takes the form of a garden made up of 15 varieties of endemic plants and trees.

“The French Pavilion aims to showcase the fastest possible mobility there can be, but also to embody the Enlightenment, which has been a symbol of the sharing and spreading of knowledge since the eighteenth century”, stated Erik Linquier, President of Cofrex and France's Commissioner General for the Expo 2020 Dubai. “In keeping with the ecological ambition of the One Planet Summit, this pavilion will be the most sustainable ever built,” he said.

==== The construction of the French Pavilion ====
On 2 May, the Minister for Transport, Élisabeth Borne, unveiled the site where the French Pavilion for the Expo 2020 Dubai was to be established. The following people were also in attendance: Najeeb Al-Ali, executive director of the 2020 Exhibition Office, Ludovic Pouille French ambassador to the United Arab Emirates and Joëlle Garriaud-Maylam, senator representing French citizens living abroad.

In her statements to the press, the Minister stressed France's commitment to an ecological transition and combatting global warming.

==== French sponsor companies ====
To organize France's participation to the Expo 2020 in the best possible way, Cofrex is seeking public and private sponsors in the digital and urban services fields. Several French companies and institutions have already announced that they are sponsoring the French Pavilion:

- As an ambassador for the Expo 2020, Engie is one of the main sponsors of the event. The energy provider will introduce its innovations in the fields of sustainable cities and connected territories, with smart cities and responsible mobility being in the spotlight.
- Alcatel-Lucent Enterprise is the IT technology sponsor and will provide the French Pavilion with network and communication solutions to connect visitors.
- Bureau Veritas is supporting the French Pavilion in the form of a skills-based sponsorship as part of an agreement signed with Cofrex. The company will provide access to its specialized construction teams to take care of the Pavilion's CSR (Corporate Social Responsibility) during the event.
- RATP has also signed a sponsorship agreement with Cofrex. The group will help by showcasing its innovations in the field of smart cities and its sustainable mobility solutions.
- CNES (National Centre for Space Studies) is also sponsoring the French Pavilion. It will offer visitors the chance to find out about French space activities through films, satellite images and models. In addition, throughout the entire construction period of the event, CNES will offer satellite views of the site in Dubai, with a focus on the French Pavilion.

The other sponsors of the French Pavilion are: Orange, Renault, EDF, Lacoste, Accor, la Région Île-de-France, Suez, Akuo Energy, Axa, Schneider Electric, A.T. Kearney, Radio France, France Médias Monde, France Télévisions, INA, Médiatransports, JCDecaux, French Business Council Dubaï and Northern Emirates, IDATE DigiWorld, Business France, Paris Ile-de-France Capitale Économique, Alliance française Dubaï, IFF, la Guilde.

=== Future events ===
On 23 November 2018, the Member States of the BIE chose Japan as the host country for the World Expo in 2025. The event will be held in Osaka and the theme will be “Designing Future Society for Our Lives.”

== Specialised Expos ==
The next Specialised Expo will be held in Buenos Aires (Argentina) in 2023. It will have the following theme: “Creative Industries in Digital Convergence”. This will be the first Specialised Expo organized by Cofrex.

== Management ==
Erik Linquier has served as the president of Cofrex since it was established in 2018. In this capacity, he has been appointed as the General Commissioner of the French Pavilion for the Expo 2020 in Dubai.

A graduate of Sciences Po and ENA, Erik Linquier began his career as an auditor at the Court of Auditors. He then joined the Ministry of Finance where he worked as an economic advisor at the French Embassy in Canada. He later worked as a French negotiator for European Union free trade agreements, and finally as Secretary-General for the French Treasury. He also held the position of Deputy Secretary-General at Enedis, the world's leading energy group. Until 2017, Erik Linquier was the executive director at Accenture.
