= Anne-Claire Legendre =

French diplomat

President of the Institut du monde arabe
- Incumbent
- Assumed office February 2026
- Preceded by: Jack Lang

Spokesperson of the Ministry for Europe and Foreign Affairs
- In office 1 September 2021 – 2023

Ambassador of France to Kuwait
- In office 2020–2021

Consul General of France, New York City
- In office 10 February 2016 – 30 July 2020

Personal details
- Born: June 3, 1979 (age 47) Brittany, France
- Education: Sciences Po; INALCO; Sorbonne Nouvelle University
- Awards: Ordre national du Mérite (2023)

Anne-Claire Legendre (born 3 June 1979 in Brittany) is a French female diplomat and politician. Since February 2026, she has served as President of the Institut du monde arabe, succeeding Jack Lang.

== Biography ==
Anne-Claire Legendre was born on 3 June 1979 in Brittany, France. Her mother, Maurice Fresneau, was a professor of medicine, and was the founder of the Universite Angevine du Temps Libre.

Prior to entering politics, she studied at Sciences Po and humanities at the Sorbonne Nouvelle University, before studying Arabic at the Institut national des langues et civilisations orientales.

== Career ==
Legendre began her work at the French embassy in Yemen, working in the press office between 2006 and 2007. In 2007, she joined the French directorate of the Ministry of Foreign Affairs, and developed consular cooperation programs amongst members of the European Union.

Between 2010 and 2013, she joined the Permanent Mission of France to the United Nations, where she was given trust on sensitive files regarding the Middle East in the United Nations Security Council.

In 2013, she joined the cabinet for the newly-formed Ministry for Europe and Foreign Affairs under Laurent Fabius, as Councillor of the MENA region, before becoming Consul General of France in New York City in 2016.

On 10 September 2020, Legendre was appointed Ambassador Extraordinary and Plenipotentiary of the French Republic to the State of Kuwait. On July 28, 2021, she was appointed Director of Communications and Press for the Ministry for Europe and Foreign Affairs, and took office on September 1.

Starting in March 2022, she was regularly invited by 24-hour news channels to comment, in particular, on the situation following Russia's invasion of Ukraine.

In 2026, as the first woman to hold the position, she was appointed president of the Institut du monde arabe, succeeding Jack Lang after his retirement from the Epstein files.
