= Raymonde Le Texier =

French politician (born 1939)

Raymonde Le Texier (born 29 October 1939) is a member of the Senate of France, representing the Val-d'Oise department. She is a member of the Socialist Party, and the vice president of the Commission of Social Affairs.
