= Bernard Angels =

French politician

Bernard Angels (born 18 September 1944) is a former member of the Senate of France who represented the Val-d'Oise department from 1997 to 2011. He is a member of the Socialist Party.

== Bibliography ==
- Page on the Senate website (in French)
