= Stanley Fischer =

American and Israeli economist (1943–2025)

- סטנלי פישר
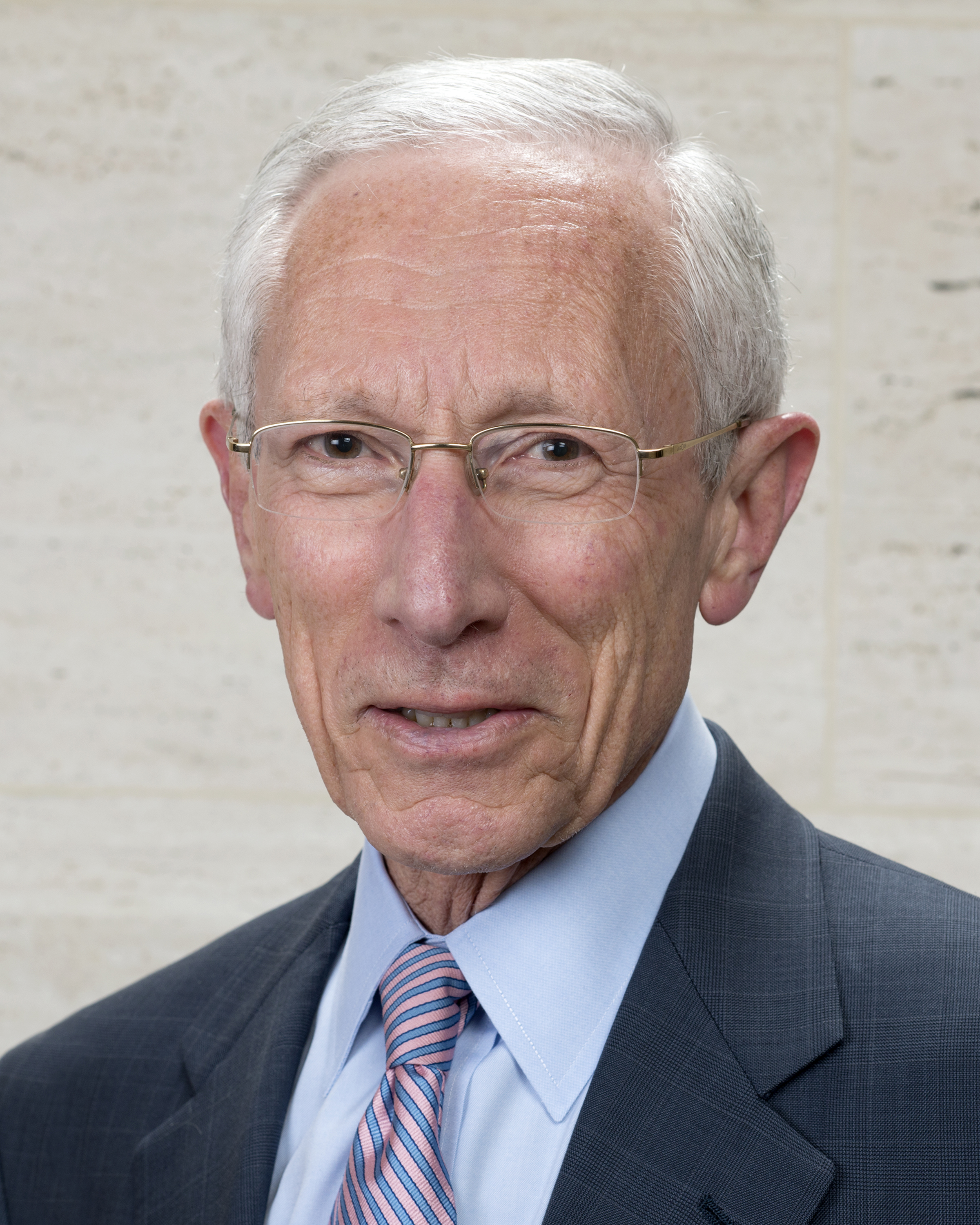
- Official portrait, 2014

20th Vice Chair of the Federal Reserve
- In office June 16, 2014 – October 13, 2017
- President: Barack Obama; Donald Trump
- Preceded by: Janet Yellen
- Succeeded by: Richard Clarida

Member of the Board of Governors of the Federal Reserve
- In office May 21, 2014 – October 13, 2017
- President: Barack Obama; Donald Trump
- Preceded by: Ben Bernanke
- Succeeded by: Michelle Bowman

8th Governor of the Bank of Israel
- In office May 1, 2005 – June 30, 2013
- Prime Minister: Ariel Sharon; Ehud Olmert; Benjamin Netanyahu
- Preceded by: David Klein
- Succeeded by: Karnit Flug

6th First Deputy Managing Director of the International Monetary Fund
- In office September 1, 1994 – August 31, 2001
- Managing Director: Michel Camdessus; Horst Köhler
- Preceded by: Richard Erb
- Succeeded by: Anne Osborn Krueger

3rd Chief Economist of the World Bank
- In office January 1988 – August 1990
- President: Barber Conable
- Preceded by: Anne Osborn Krueger
- Succeeded by: Lawrence Summers

Personal details
- Born: October 15, 1943 Mazabuka, Northern Rhodesia
- Died: May 31, 2025 (aged 81) Lexington, Massachusetts, U.S.
- Spouse: Rhoda Keet (m. 1965; died 2020)
- Children: 3
- Education: London School of Economics (BSc, MSc); Massachusetts Institute of Technology (PhD)
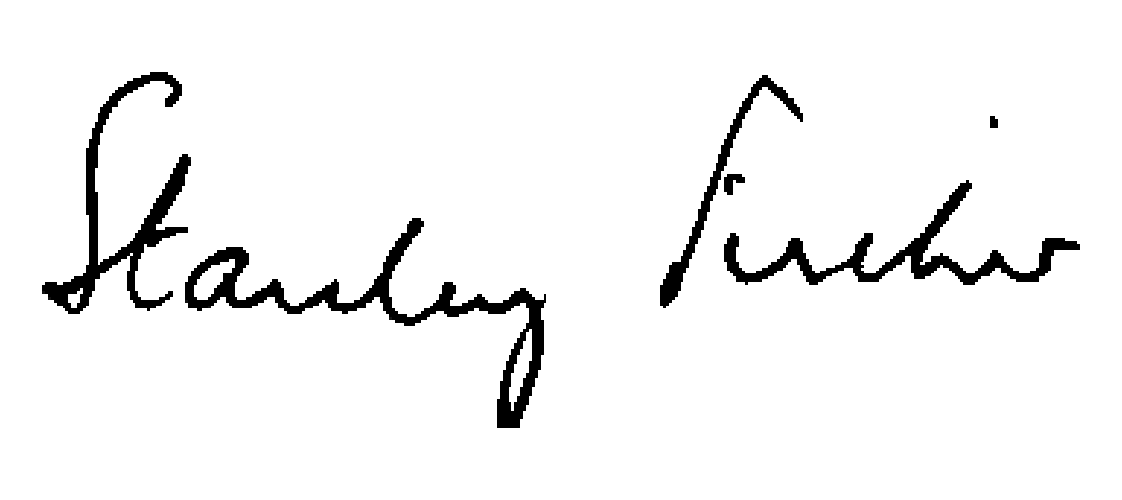
- Signature

Academic background
- Doctoral advisor: Franklin M. Fisher

Academic work
- Discipline: Macroeconomics
- School or tradition: New Keynesian economics
- Doctoral students: Zvi Bodie; Isher Judge Ahluwalia; Frederic Mishkin; Steven M. Sheffrin; Olivier Blanchard; Ben Bernanke; Kazuo Ueda; David Hsieh; Kenneth D. West; Greg Mankiw; Jeffrey Miron; Mark Bils; David Romer; Ricardo J. Caballero; Michael Kuehlwein; D. Nathan Sheets; Ilan Goldfajn

Stanley Fischer (Hebrew: סטנלי פישר; October 15, 1943 – May 31, 2025) was an American and Israeli economist who served as the 20th vice chair of the Federal Reserve of the United States from 2014 to 2017. Fischer previously served as the 8th governor of the Bank of Israel from 2005 to 2013. Born in Northern Rhodesia (now Zambia), he held dual citizenship in Israel and the United States. He previously served as First Deputy Managing Director of the International Monetary Fund and as Chief Economist of the World Bank. On January 10, 2014, President Barack Obama nominated Fischer to the position of Vice Chair of the Federal Reserve. On September 6, 2017, Fischer announced that he was resigning as vice-chair for personal reasons effective October 13, 2017. He was a senior advisor at BlackRock.

== Background ==
Stanley Fischer, whose Hebrew name was Shlomo Ben Pesach Hacohen, was born into a Jewish family in Lusaka, Northern Rhodesia (now Zambia), on October 15, 1943. When he was 13, his family moved to Southern Rhodesia (now Zimbabwe), where he became an active member of Habonim, a Labor Zionist youth movement. In 1960, he visited Israel as part of a winter program for youth leaders, and studied Hebrew at kibbutz Ma'agan Michael.

Fischer initially intended to study chemistry at the Hebrew University of Jerusalem, but was drawn to economics after being introduced to the work of Paul Samuelson at the Massachusetts Institute of Technology and reading The General Theory of Employment, Interest, and Money by John Maynard Keynes. He accepted a scholarship to attend the London School of Economics in England, where he received B.Sc. and M.Sc. degrees in economics between 1962 and 1966. While at LSE, he studied Keynesian macroeconomics and was introduced to econometric modeling. He subsequently enrolled in the doctoral program in economics at the Massachusetts Institute of Technology (MIT), citing the presence of Paul Samuelson and Robert Solow as a primary factor in his decision. He received a Ph.D. in 1969 with a dissertation titled Essays on Assets and Contingent Commodities, which addressed general equilibrium theory under uncertainty. He became a naturalized United States citizen in 1976.

In 1965, Fischer married Rhoda Keet, whom he met during his days in Habonim; the couple had three children. When they moved to Israel, Rhoda became honorary president of Aleh Negev, a rehabilitation village for the disabled. Rhoda Fischer died in 2020.

Fischer died from Alzheimer's disease at his home in Lexington, Massachusetts, on May 31, 2025, at age 81.

== Academic career ==
Fischer began his academic career at the University of Chicago faculty, serving as an assistant professor from 1970 to 1973. He returned to MIT in 1973, where he stayed for the remainder of his academic career. He held the Elizabeth and James Killian Class of 1926 Professorship from 1992 to 1995 and served as department chair in 1993–94, before working at the IMF.

Many of Fischer's students at MIT went on to prominent roles in global economic policy, including Federal Reserve chairman Ben Bernanke, European Central Bank president Mario Draghi, Inter-American Development Bank president Ilan Goldfajn, Reserve Bank of Australia governor Philip Lowe, and Bank of Japan governor Kazuo Ueda. Others, such as Greg Mankiw and Christina Romer, chaired the Council of Economic Advisers, while Maurice Obstfeld, Kenneth Rogoff, and Frederic Mishkin held senior positions at the International Monetary Fund and the Federal Reserve.

In 1977, Fischer published the paper Long-Term Contracts, Rational Expectations, and the Optimal Money Supply Rule, which reconciled the concept of rational expectations—developed by new classical economists such as Robert Lucas—with the phenomena of price stickiness and observed this fusion creates certain market imperfections and advocated for active monetary policy to mitigate economic downturns. Through this critique of new classical macroeconomics, Fischer contributed significantly to clarifying the limits of the policy-ineffectiveness proposition. Fischer's analysis contributed to the foundation of New Keynesian economics.

He authored three popular economics textbooks, Macroeconomics (with Rüdiger Dornbusch), Lectures on Macroeconomics (with Olivier Blanchard), and the introductory Economics, with David Begg and Rüdiger Dornbusch.

In 2012, Fischer served as Humanitas Visiting Professor in Economic Thought at the University of Oxford.

== Public policy and banking career ==
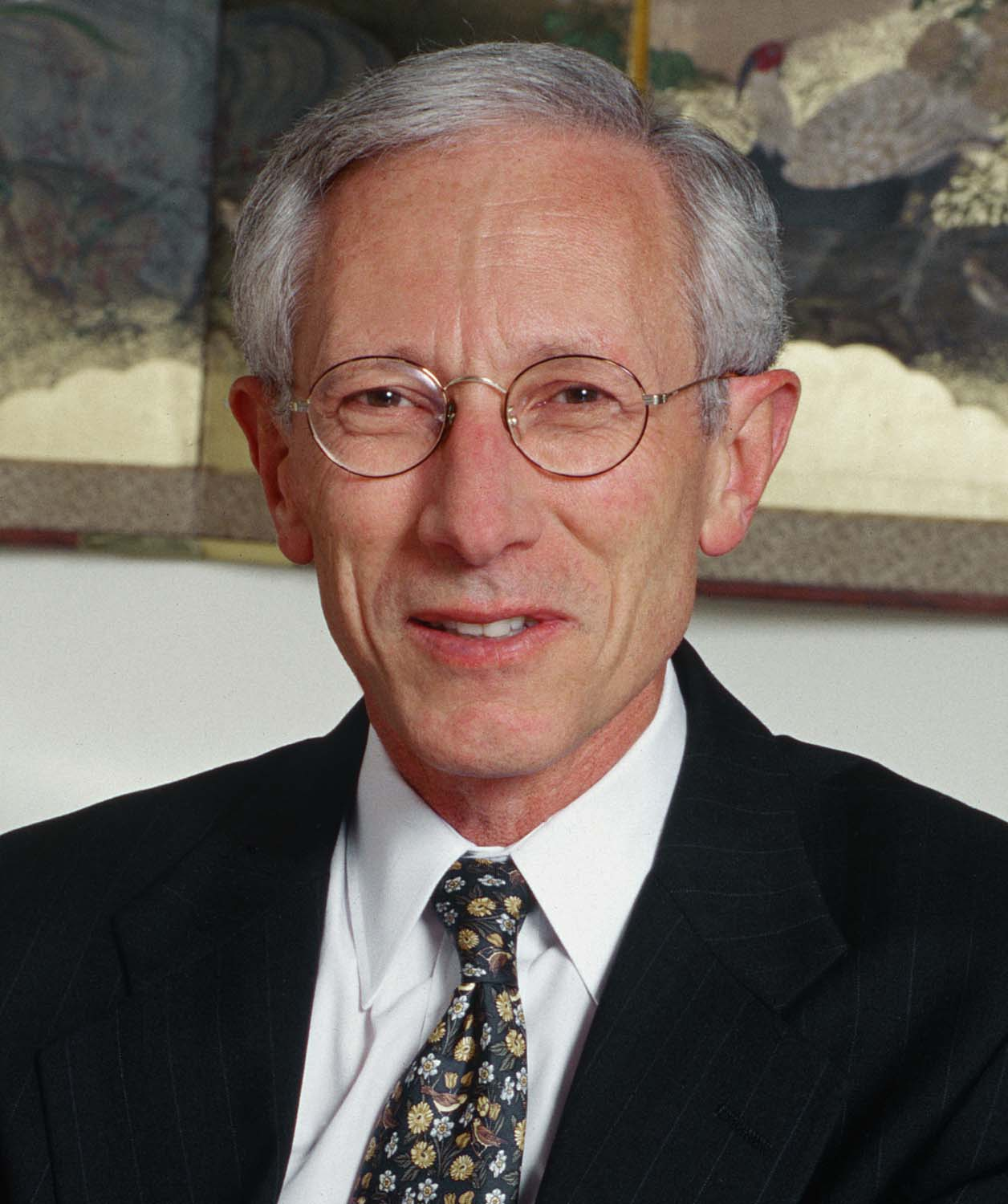
Stanley Fischer in 2000 at the International Monetary Fund

From January 1988 to August 1990 he served as Chief Economist of the World Bank. He was then appointed First Deputy Managing Director of the International Monetary Fund, and served in that role from September 1994 to August 2001. By the end of 2001, Fischer had joined the Group of Thirty, an influential Washington D.C.-based financial advisory body. From February 2002 to April 2005, after leaving the IMF, he was an executive at Citigroup, where he served as Vice Chairman, President of Citigroup International, and Head of the Public Sector Client Group.

=== Bank of Israel ===
Fischer was appointed Governor of the Bank of Israel in January 2005 by the Israeli cabinet, after being recommended by Prime Minister Ariel Sharon and Finance Minister Benjamin Netanyahu. He had been involved in the past with the Bank of Israel; he had helped implement Israel's 1985 Economic Stabilization Plan as a U.S. government adviser. He took the position on May 1, 2005, replacing David Klein (who ended his term on January 16, 2005), and was sworn in for a second term on May 2, 2010. Fischer became an Israeli citizen, but did not renounce his U.S. citizenship.

Under his management, in 2010, the Bank of Israel was ranked first among central banks for its efficient functioning, according to IMD's World Competitiveness Yearbook.

Fischer was widely praised for his handling of the Israeli economy during the 2008 financial crisis. In September 2009, the Bank of Israel was the first bank in the developed world to raise interest rates. In 2009, 2010, 2011, and 2012 Fischer received an "A" rating on the Central Banker Report Card published by Global Finance magazine.

In June 2011, Fischer applied for the post of IMF managing director to replace Dominique Strauss-Kahn, but was barred, as the IMF stipulates that a new managing director must be no older than 65, and he was 67 at the time.

On June 30, 2013, Fischer stepped down as Governor of the Bank of Israel halfway through his second term, despite high popularity.

=== U.S. Federal Reserve ===
American President Barack Obama nominated Fischer to the position of Vice Chair of the Federal Reserve, the United States' central bank, in January 2014. In nominating Fischer for the position, Obama stated he brought "decades of leadership and expertise from various roles, including serving at the International Monetary Fund and the Bank of Israel."

On May 21, 2014, the Senate confirmed Fischer's appointment to the Federal Reserve Board of Governors. In a separate vote on June 12, he was confirmed as the vice chair. Fischer succeeded Janet Yellen as vice chair; Yellen had become Chair of the Federal Reserve earlier in 2014. Fischer resigned for personal reasons in mid-October 2017, eight months before the expiry in June 2018 of his term as vice chair.

== Awards and recognition ==
Fischer received an honorary doctorate from the Hebrew University of Jerusalem in 2006. In October 2010, Fischer was declared Central Bank Governor of the Year by Euromoney magazine. He was the winner of Central Banking's Lifetime Achievement Award in 2022.

He was a member of the Bilderberg Group and attended its conferences in 1996, 1998, and 1999. He also appears to have attended the Bilderberg Group's conference in 2011 in St. Moritz, Switzerland, though (as of March 2016) his name does not show up on the list of participants for the year 2011. He was a Distinguished Fellow of the Council on Foreign Relations. Fischer was named a Distinguished Fellow of the American Economic Association in 2013. He was also a member of the Inter-American Dialogue.

Diplomatic posts
Preceded by Anne Osborn Krueger	Chief Economist of the World Bank; 1988–1990	Succeeded by Lawrence Summers
Preceded by Richard D. Erb	First Deputy Managing Director of the International Monetary Fund; 1994–2001	Succeeded by Anne Osborn Krueger
Government offices
Preceded by David Klein	Governor of the Bank of Israel; 2005–2013	Succeeded by Karnit Flug
Preceded by Ben Bernanke	Member of the Federal Reserve Board of Governors; 2014–2017	Succeeded by Michelle Bowman
Preceded by Janet Yellen	Vice Chair of the Federal Reserve; 2014–2017	Succeeded by Richard Clarida
