= Jacques J. Polak =

Dutch economist (1914–2010)

Jacques Polak
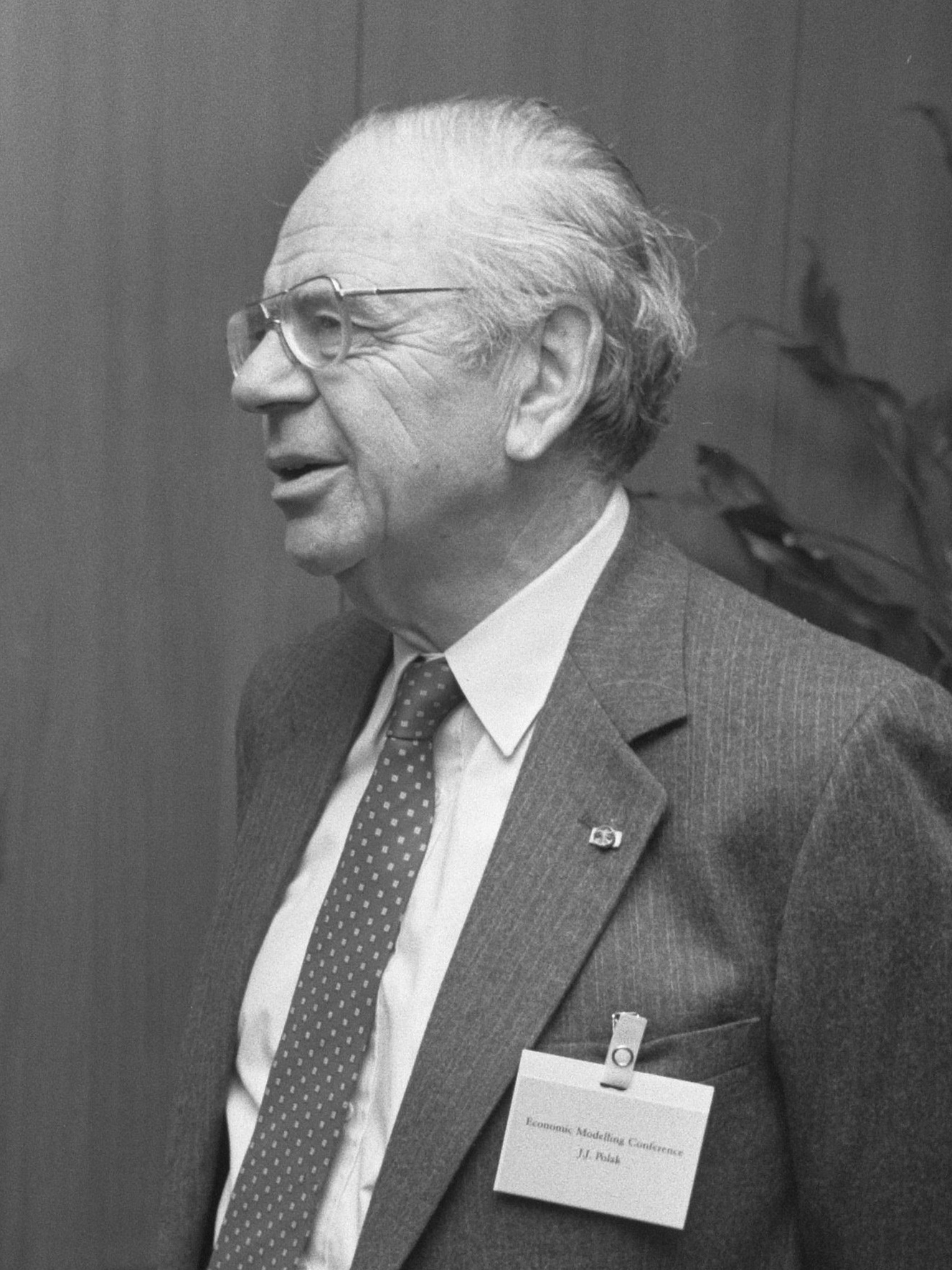
- Polak in 1987

Chief Economist of the International Monetary Fund
- In office 1958–1980
- President: Per Jacobsson; Pierre-Paul Schweitzer; Johan Witteveen; Jacques de Larosière
- Preceded by: Edward Bernstein
- Succeeded by: William Hood

Personal details
- Born: Jacques Jacobus Polak; 25 April 1914 Rotterdam, Netherlands
- Died: 26 February 2010 (aged 95) Bethesda, Maryland, U.S.
- Education: University of Amsterdam (PhD)

Academic background
- Influences: Jan Tinbergen

Academic work
- Discipline: Monetary economics Econometrics
- Institutions: International Monetary Fund

Jacques Jacobus Polak (25 April 1914 – 26 February 2010) was a Dutch economist. He received his doctorate in economics in 1937 from the University of Amsterdam. His first professional work was with Professor Jan Tinbergen. In 1938 he began his international service at the Economic and Financial Organization of the League of Nations, where he served until 1943. He was a member of the Netherlands delegations to the 1944 Bretton Woods Conference establishing the International Monetary Fund and to the Atlantic City conference that established the United Nations Relief and Rehabilitation Administration (UNRRA). During this period, he served at the Dutch Embassy in Washington. From 1944 to 1946, he was an Assistant Financial Adviser, and then Economic Adviser to the Director General of UNRRA.

He joined the staff of the International Monetary Fund in January 1947, serving first as Chief of the Statistics Division, and then as assistant director, deputy director, and from 1958, as Director, of Research. In 1966, he also became the Economic Counsellor of the Fund, a position which he held until his retirement from the Fund staff in 1979. After serving briefly as Adviser to the managing director, he was elected in January 1981 as executive director of the Fund for the constituency of Cyprus, Israel, the Netherlands, Romania, and Yugoslavia. He served with distinction as an executive director until 1986 when he retired for a second time. Subsequently, in addition to engaging in a full agenda of research and writing, he served as a Consultant with the World Bank, as a Senior Adviser to the Development Center of the Organisation for Economic Co-operation and Development (OECD), and, after 1987, as President of the Per Jacobsson Foundation.

The International Monetary Fund recently honored Polak by naming its annual research conference after him.

Jacques Polak's first publication appeared in 1937. He wrote more than ninety papers and six books. One of his main contributions was an analytic model published in an article by Polak in 1957 and today known as the Polak Model.

In addition, Dr. Polak was an awarded the rank of Commander in the Order of the Orange-Nassau, a rare distinction.

Polak was elected a corresponding member of the Royal Netherlands Academy of Arts and Sciences in 1978.

== Selected publications ==
- ——— (1943), "European Exchange Depreciation in the Early Twenties", Econometrica, 11 (2): 151–162, doi:10.2307/1909265, JSTOR 1909265.
- ——— (1955), "The Economics of Scrabble", American Economic Review, 45 (4): 648–652, JSTOR 1811640.
- ——— (1957), "Monetary Analysis of Income Formation and Payments Problems", IMF Staff Papers, 6 (1): 1–50, doi:10.2307/3866128, JSTOR 3866128.

Diplomatic posts
Preceded by Edward Bernstein	Chief Economist of the International Monetary Fund; 1958–1980	Succeeded by William Hood
