= Maurice Obstfeld =

American economist (born 1952)

Maury Obstfeld

Chief Economist of the International Monetary Fund
- In office 8 September 2015 – 31 December 2018
- President: Christine Lagarde
- Preceded by: Olivier Blanchard
- Succeeded by: Gita Gopinath

Personal details
- Born: 19 March 1952 (age 74) New York City, U.S.
- Education: University of Pennsylvania (BA); King's College, Cambridge (MA); Massachusetts Institute of Technology (PhD)

Academic background
- Doctoral advisor: Rudi Dornbusch

Academic work
- Discipline: International economics
- School or tradition: New Keynesian economics
- Institutions: University of California, Berkeley
- Website: Information at IDEAS / RePEc

Maurice Moses "Maury" Obstfeld (born March 19, 1952) is a professor of economics at the University of California, Berkeley and previously Chief Economist at the International Monetary Fund. He is also a nonresident senior fellow at the Peterson Institute for International Economics.

He is well known for his work in international economics and his research on the global economy. He is among the most influential economists in the world according to IDEAS/RePEc. He graduated from University of Pennsylvania summa cum laude, Cambridge and MIT, where received his Ph.D. in 1979. Director of the Center for International and Development Economic Research (CIDER). He joined Berkeley in 1989 as a professor, following appointments at Columbia (1979–1986) and the University of Pennsylvania (1986–1989). He was also a visiting professor at Harvard between 1989 and 1991. Obstfeld serves as honorary advisor to the Bank of Japan's Institute of Monetary and Economic Studies. Among Obstfeld's honors are the Carroll Round Keynote Lecture, Woodward Lecture, and Bernhard Harms Prize and Lecture in 2004. Obstfeld is a Fellow of the Econometric Society and the American Academy of Arts and Sciences. He is active as a research Fellow of CEPR, a research associate at NBER, and an International Research Fellow at the Kiel Institute for the World Economy.

On June 3, 2014, the White House announced that Obstfeld would join the Council of Economic Advisers as lead macroeconomist.

On July 20, 2015, Christine Lagarde, managing director of the International Monetary Fund (IMF), announced her intention to appoint Obstfeld as Economic Counsellor and Director of the IMF's Research Department. Obstfeld succeeds Olivier Blanchard whose retirement was announced previously. He began his work at the Fund on September 8, 2015.

== Books and selected publications ==
- "Economic Policy for a Pandemic Age: How the World Must Prepare" with Monica de Bolle and Adam S. Posen, April 2021
- "How the G20 Can Hasten Recovery from COVID-19" with Adam S. Posen, April 2020
- "Meeting Globalization's Challenges" with Luís A. V. Catão, 2019
- "Advancing the Frontiers of Monetary Policy" with Tobias Adrian and Douglas Laxton, 2018
- "Coping with the Climate Crisis" with Rabah Arezki and Patrick Bolton and Karim El Aynaoui, 2018
- "International Economics: Theory and Policy" with Paul Krugman and Marc Melitz, 2018
- "Global Economic Crisis" with Dongchul Cho and Andrew Mason, 2012
- "Too Much Focus on the Yuan?" (with Alan J. Auerbach), October 2010
- "Lenders of Last Resort and Global Liquidity: Rethinking the System," Development Outreach (World Bank Institute), December 2009
- "Global Capital Markets" with Alan M. Taylor, 2004
- Money, Capital Mobility, and Trade: Essays in Honor of Robert Mundell, with Guillermo Calvo and Rudi Dornbusch, 2001
- Globalization and Macroeconomics, Fall 2000
- International Economics: Theory and Policy, with Paul Krugman and Marc Melitz
- Foundations of International Macroeconomics, with Kenneth Rogoff

Diplomatic posts
Preceded by Olivier Blanchard	Chief Economist of the International Monetary Fund; 2015–2018	Succeeded by Gita Gopinath
