= Chief Economist of the International Monetary Fund =

Role in the International Monetary Fund

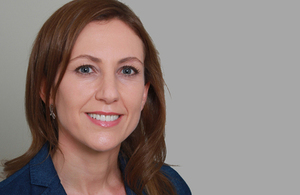
- Incumbent; Silvana Tenreyro since 10 August 2026
- Formation: 1946 (80 years ago)
- First holder: Edward Bernstein

The chief economist of the International Monetary Fund (IMF) is the economic counsellor and director of the fund's Research Department. The person holding the position is responsible for providing independent advice to the fund on its policy issues, integrating ideas of research in design of policies, conveying these ideas to the policymakers inside and outside the fund and managing all research done at IMF. The chief economist is a member of the Senior Leadership of the IMF.

"The job is one of the most prestigious in the field, and has been held by some of the most prominent academic researchers in international economics." The chief economist is part of the senior leadership team, directly advises the managing director, and leads about a hundred Ph.D. economists in the Research Department.

The Research Department publishes working papers on highly relevant policy and research issues in international economics; produces a number of reports including the widely tracked annual World Economic Outlook; organizes conferences including the annual research conference that brings together top economists and policymakers; and publishes the peer-reviewed journal IMF Economic Review.

== List of IMF Chief Economists ==
The position has been held by the following:

Name	Start	End	University at appointment
Edward Bernstein	1946	1958	
Jacques Polak	1958	1980	
William Hood	1980	1987	
Jacob Frenkel	1987	1991	University of Chicago
Michael Mussa	August 1991	29 June 2001	University of Chicago
Kenneth Rogoff	August 2001	September 2003	Harvard University
Raghuram Rajan	September 2003	January 2007	University of Chicago
Simon Johnson	March 2007	31 August 2008	Massachusetts Institute of Technology
Olivier Blanchard	1 September 2008	8 September 2015	Massachusetts Institute of Technology
Maurice Obstfeld	8 September 2015	31 December 2018	University of California, Berkeley
Gita Gopinath	1 January 2019	21 January 2022	Harvard University
Pierre-Olivier Gourinchas	24 January 2022	1 July 2026	University of California, Berkeley
Silvana Tenreyro	10 August 2026	Incumbent	London School of Economics

== See also ==
- Chief Economist of the World Bank
