= Silvana Tenreyro =

British-Argentine economist

Silvana Tenreyro CBE FBA
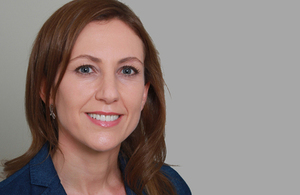
- Tenreyro in 2017

Chief Economist of the International Monetary Fund
- Incumbent
- Assumed office 10 August 2026
- President: Kristalina Georgieva
- Preceded by: Pierre-Olivier Gourinchas

Personal details
- Born: María Silvana Tenreyro; 6 September 1973 (age 53) Argentina
- Education: National University of Tucumán (BA); Harvard University (MA, PhD)

María Silvana Tenreyro (born 6 September 1973) is a British-Argentine economist who is professor of economics at the London School of Economics and was an external member of the Bank of England's Monetary Policy Committee from July 2017 to July 2023. She was president of the European Economic Association for 2021. Since 2026 she is the Economic Counsellor and Director of the Research Department, at the International Monetary Fund.

== Early life and education ==
She graduated with a BA (summa cum laude) from the National University of Tucumán, Argentina, in 1997, followed by an MA and a PhD in economics at Harvard University, where she was supervised by Robert Barro, Alberto Alesina and Kenneth Rogoff.

She was appointed to a three-year term on the Bank of England Monetary Policy Committee from July 2017, and was reappointed for a second term from July 2020. She has been a professor of economics at the London School of Economics. She worked at the US Federal Reserve Bank of Boston from 2002 to 2004 and at the Bank of Mauritius from 2012 to 2014.

Tenreyro was elected fellow of the British Academy (FBA) in July 2018. In 2021 she was named a Fellow of the Econometric Society. She has British, Italian and Argentine citizenships.

She was appointed Commander of the Order of the British Empire (CBE) in the 2023 Birthday Honours for services to the economy.

For her academic work on Macroeconomics and International Economics, Tenreyro was awarded the Yrjö Jahnsson Award (2021), the Birgit Grodal Award (2022), the Banque de France and Toulouse School of Economics Junior Prize in Monetary Economics and Finance (2021) and the Carl Menger Prize in Monetary Macroeconomics (2018). She was also awarded an Honorary Doctorate by the University of St. Gallen.

In July 2026, IMF managing director Kristalina Georgieva appointed Tenreyro as the IMF's Economic Counsellor and Director of the Research Department, effective 10 August 2026.

Diplomatic posts
| Preceded by Pierre-Olivier Gourinchas | Chief Economist of the International Monetary Fund; Taking office 2026 | Designate |
