= Pierre-Olivier Gourinchas =

French economist (born 1968)

Chief Economist of the International Monetary Fund
- In office 24 January 2022 – 30 June 2026
- President: Kristalina Georgieva
- Preceded by: Gita Gopinath
- Succeeded by: Silvana Tenreyro

Personal details
- Born: 30 March 1968 (age 58)
- Education: École Polytechnique; École des Hautes Etudes en Sciences Sociales; École des ponts ParisTech; Massachusetts Institute of Technology (PhD)

Pierre-Olivier Gourinchas (born 30 March 1968) is a French economist who served as the chief economist of the International Monetary Fund from 2022 to 2026. Gourinchas is the S.K. and Angela Chan Professor of Management at the University of California, Berkeley, the director of the Clausen Center for International Business and Policy, and is affiliated with the Haas School of Business. His research focuses on macroeconomics, in particular international macroeconomics and international finance. In 2008, Gourinchas received the Prize of the Best Young Economist of France.

== Biography ==
Pierre-Olivier Gourinchas studied at the École Polytechnique (1987–90), École des Hautes Etudes en Sciences Sociales (1990–91), École des Ponts et Chaussées (1990–93), and Massachusetts Institute of Technology (1993–96), obtaining a Ph.D. from the last with a thesis on exchange rates and consumption under Olivier Blanchard, Ricardo Caballero and Rudiger Dornbusch. Since his graduation, Gourinchas has held academic positions at the Stanford Graduate School of Business, Princeton University, and - since 2003 - at the University of California, Berkeley, where he has been the Director of the Clausen Center for International Business and Policy since 2013. Moreover, Gourinchas is also editor-in-chief of the IMF Economic Review, managing editor of the Journal of International Economics and co-director of the NBER International Finance and Macroeconomics programme. He is a fellow of the Econometric Society.

=== IMF ===
Effective January 24, 2022, he was appointed the Chief Economist of the International Monetary Fund (IMF), succeeding Gita Gopinath. As Chief Economist, he is part of the Senior Leadership of the IMF.

In October 2023, Gourinchas advised central banks to keep monetary policy tightened as despite some decreases in late 2023, the risks from inflation to the health of economies remained high.

In January 2024, he issued an updated IMF World Economic Outlook in which he described projected global economic growth and the status of inflation. He has stated that US economic growth, fiscal stimulus in China and risks from wars are relevant in IMF forecasting.

He stepped down from his IMF positions at the end of June 2026.

== Research ==
Pierre-Olivier Gourinchas' research interests include consumption, precautionary savings, credit expansions, the forward premium anomaly, exchange rates and labour markets. According to IDEAS/RePEc, Gourinchas belongs to the top 2% of economists as ranked by research output.

== Key publications ==
- Gourinchas, P.O., Parker, J.A. (2002). Consumption over the life cycle. Econometrica, 70(1), pp. 47–89.
- Gourinchas, P.O., Farhi, E., Caballero, R.J. (2008). An Equilibrium Model of "Global Imbalances" and Low Interest Rates. American Economic Review, 98, pp. 358–393.
- Gourinchas, P.O., Rey, H. (2007). From world banker to world venture capitalist: US external adjustment and the exorbitant privilege. In: Clarida, R.H. (ed.). G7 Current Account Imbalances. Chicago: University of Chicago Press, pp. 11–66.
- Gourinchas, P.O., Rey, H. (2005). International financial adjustment. NBER Working Paper Series.
- Gourinchas, P.O., Jeanne, O. (2006). The elusive gains from international financial integration. Review of Economic Studies, 73(3), pp. 715–741.
- Gourinchas, P.O., Obstfeld, M. (2012). Stories of the twentieth century for the twenty-first. American Economic Journal: Macroeconomics, 4(1), pp. 226–265.
- Gourinchas, P.O., Valdes, R., Landerretche, O. (2001). Lending booms: Latin America and the world. NBER Working Paper Series.
- Gourinchas, P.O., Jeanne, O. (2007). Capital flows to developing countries: The allocation puzzle. NBER Working Paper Series.
- Gourinchas, P.O., Rey, H. (2014). External adjustment, global imbalances, valuation effects. In: Handbook of International Economics, vol. 4. Amsterdam: Elsevier, pp. 585–645.
- Gourinchas, P.O., Tornell, A. (2004). Exchange rate puzzles and distorted beliefs. Journal of International Economics, 64(2), pp. 303–333.
- Li, N. et al. (2010). International prices, costs, and markup differences. American Economic Review.
- Gourinchas, Pierre-Olivier; Rey, Hélène (2014), Gopinath, Gita; Helpman, Elhanan; Rogoff, Kenneth (eds.), "Chapter 10 - External Adjustment, Global Imbalances, Valuation Effects", Handbook of International Economics, Handbook of International Economics, vol. 4, Elsevier, pp. 585–645

Diplomatic posts
Preceded by Gita Gopinath	Chief Economist of the International Monetary Fund; 2022–2026	Succeeded by Silvana Tenreyro; Designate
