= Jacob A. Frenkel =

Israeli economist (born 1943)

Jacob Frenkel
- יעקב פרנקל
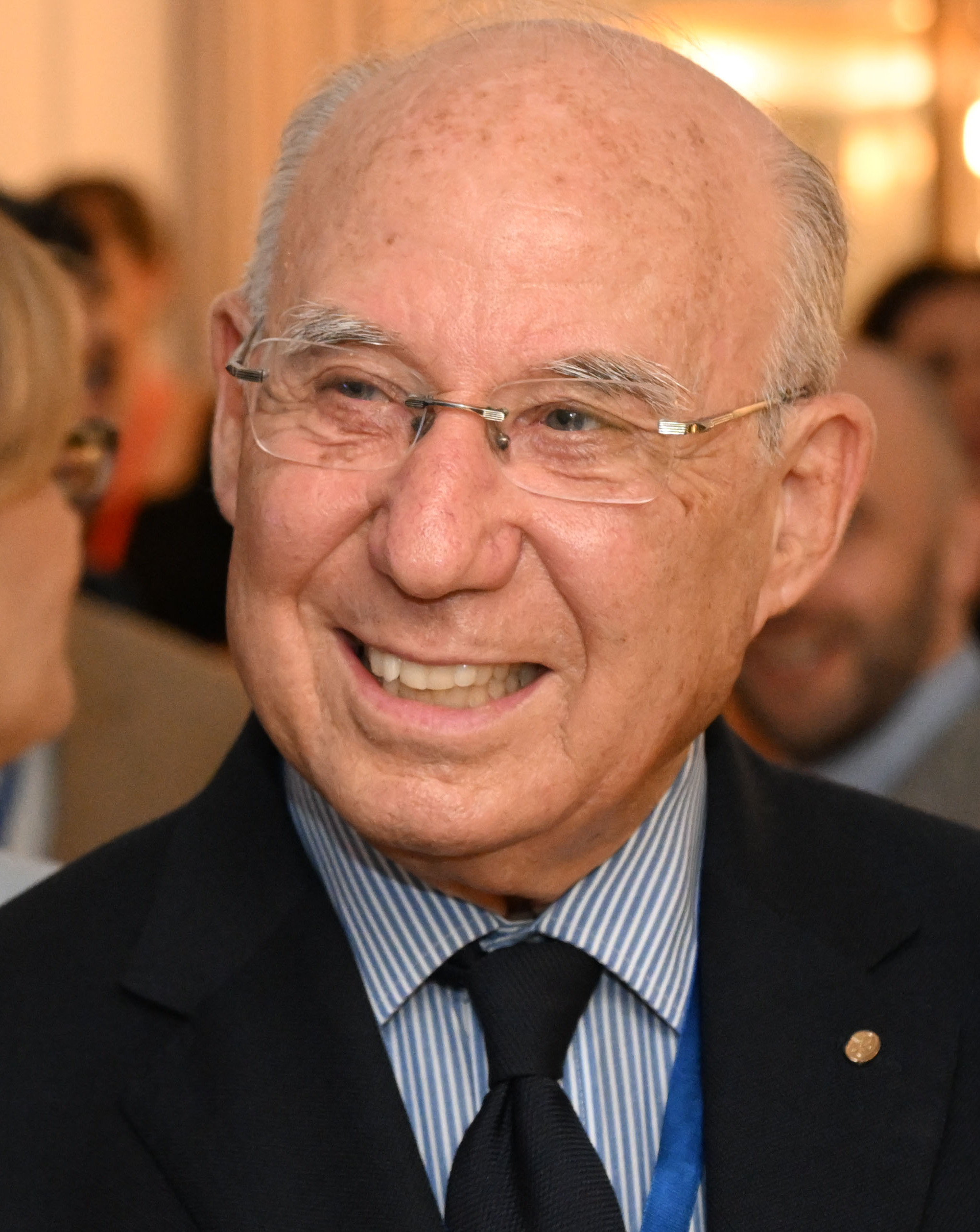
- Frenkel in 2023

Governor of the Bank of Israel
- In office 1991–2000
- Preceded by: Michael Bruno
- Succeeded by: David Klein

Chief Economist of the International Monetary Fund
- In office 1987–1991
- President: Michel Camdessus
- Preceded by: William Hood
- Succeeded by: Michael Mussa

Personal details
- Born: Jacob Aharon Frenkel; 8 February 1943 (age 83) Tel Aviv, Mandatory Palestine
- Education: Hebrew University (BA); University of Chicago (MA, PhD)

Academic background
- Doctoral advisor: Robert Mundell

Academic work
- Discipline: Economics
- Institutions: University of Chicago (1973–1987); International Monetary Fund (1987–1991); Bank of Israel (1991–2000); Merrill Lynch (2000–2004); Group of Thirty; American International Group (2004–preset); JPMorgan Chase (2009–present)
- Doctoral students: Christina Liu

Jacob Aharon Frenkel (Hebrew: יעקב אהרן פרנקל; born 8 February 1943) is an Israeli economist and, until the end of 2019, was the chairman of JPMorgan Chase International. He served as governor of the Bank of Israel between 1991 and 2000.

== Biography ==
Frenkel was born in Mandatory Palestine. He earned a B.A. in economics and political science at the Hebrew University of Jerusalem, and an M.A. and Ph.D. in economics at the University of Chicago. He earned his Ph.D. in 1970 with a thesis titled Money, Wealth and the Balance of Payments in a Model of Accumulation.

== Banking and financial career ==
Frenkel is currently the chairman of JPMorgan Chase International, which executes the international strategy of the American financial services firm. He also serves as chairman and CEO of the Group of Thirty (G-30), which is a private, nonprofit, consultative group on international economic and monetary affairs.

Frenkel served from 2004 to 2009 as vice chairman of American International Group (AIG) and from 2000 to 2004 as chairman of Merrill Lynch International, as well as chairman of Merrill Lynch’s Sovereign Advisory and Global Financial Institutions Groups. Between 1991 and 2000 he served two terms as the governor of the Bank of Israel. He is credited with reducing inflation in Israel and achieving price stability, liberalizing Israel’s financial markets, removing foreign exchange controls, and integrating the Israeli economy into the global financial system. During 1995–1996, Frenkel served as chairman of the board of governors of the Inter-American Development Bank and, during 1999–2000, as vice chairman of the board of governors of the European Bank for Reconstruction and Development.

Between 1987 and 1991, he was the economic counselor and director of research at the International Monetary Fund, and between 1973 and 1987 he was on the faculty of the University of Chicago, where he held the position of the David Rockefeller Professor of International Economics and served as editor of the Journal of Political Economy.

He is a fellow of the Econometric Society, a foreign honorary member of the American Academy of Arts and Sciences, a member of the board of directors of the National Bureau of Economic Research, a former member of the international advisory board of the Council on Foreign Relations, a member of the Trilateral Commission, a member of the board of the council for the United States and Italy, a member of the investment advisory council of the Prime Minister of Turkey, and a member of the international advisory council of the China Development Bank. He is also a member of the board of directors of the Peter G. Peterson Institute for International Economics.

In June 2013 he was nominated to be the governor of the Bank of Israel for a second time. In July 2013, following official inquiries into an event that took place in Hong Kong Airport in November 2006, he withdrew his nomination. Frankel denied any wrongdoing but authorities in Hong Kong stated that he had been arrested at the airport for suspected theft of a suit bag from a duty-free shop. Frenkel did not disclose the incident to the Committee on Senior Appointments, which vetted his nomination for a new governor of the Bank of Israel.

== Other activities ==
Frenkel serves on the Leadership Council for Concordia, a nonpartisan, nonprofit based in New York City focused on promoting effective public-private collaboration to create a more prosperous and sustainable future. In early 2021, he was appointed by the G20 to the High Level Independent Panel (HLIP) on financing the global commons for pandemic preparedness and response, co-chaired by Ngozi Okonjo-Iweala, Tharman Shanmugaratnam and Lawrence Summers.

== Awards and recognition ==
Frenkel won the 2002 Israel Prize in Economics. He received the Tel-Aviv University Hugo Ramniceanu Prize for Economics, the Czech Karel Englis Prize in Economics, the “Order de Mayo al Merito” (in the rank of Gran Cruz) decoration from the Government of Argentina and the “Order of Merit” (in the rank of Cavaliere di Gran Croce) decoration from the Republic of Italy. He is also a recipient of several Honorary Doctoral degrees and other decorations and awards, including the “1993 Economic Policy Award” by “Emerging Markets” and the “1997 Central Banker of the Year Award” by “Euromoney”.

== Published works ==
- Frenkel, Jacob A. "Current Problems of the International Monetary System: Reflections on European Monetary Integration." Weltwirtschaftliches Archiv 111 (No. 2, 1975): 216–21.
- All NBER publications by Jacob Frenkel

== See also ==
- List of Israel Prize recipients

Diplomatic posts
Preceded by William Hood	Chief Economist of the International Monetary Fund; 1987–1991	Succeeded by Michael Mussa
Government offices
Preceded by Michael Bruno	Governor of the Bank of Israel; 1991–2000	Succeeded by David Klein
