= Polak model =

The Polak model is a monetary approach to the balance of payment published by J. J. Polak in 1957. It seeks to model a small, open economy operating under fixed nominal exchange rate. Polak suggest explicit links between the monetary and external sectors. Polak results continue to form the theoretical bases on which the IMF Financial Programming are carried out.

The Polak Model is based on the following four equations:

$M_dv=Y$

$Z=mY$

$\Delta M_s=\Delta R+\Delta DC$

$\Delta R=X-Z+\Delta F$

Where $M_d$ is the demand for money, $v$ is the velocity of money (here considered constant), $Y$ is the output, $Z$ is the imports, $m$ is the marginal propensity to import, $M_s$ is the money supply, $R$ is the amount of foreign reserves, $DC$ is the Domestic Credit, $X$ is exports, and $F$ are other net foreign currency flows.

In the model the following variables are seen as exogenous:

Real Output $(Y)$, Exports $(X)$, other foreign currency inflows $(\Delta F)$ $\Delta F = NTR - INT - \Delta NFA$.

They have to be projected during the IMF Financial Programming exercise in order to set the desired levels for the target variables which are:

Level of International Reserves $(R)$ Inflation, of change in price for the domestic sector $(\Delta P_d)$ and, Credit extended to the private sector $(\Delta DC_p)$.

The model also assumes that sooner or later the market will clear meaning that demand and supply of money will equal, or:

$\Delta M_d=\Delta M_s$

== See also ==
- Mundell–Fleming model
- Marshall–Lerner condition
