= Michael Mussa =

American economist and academic

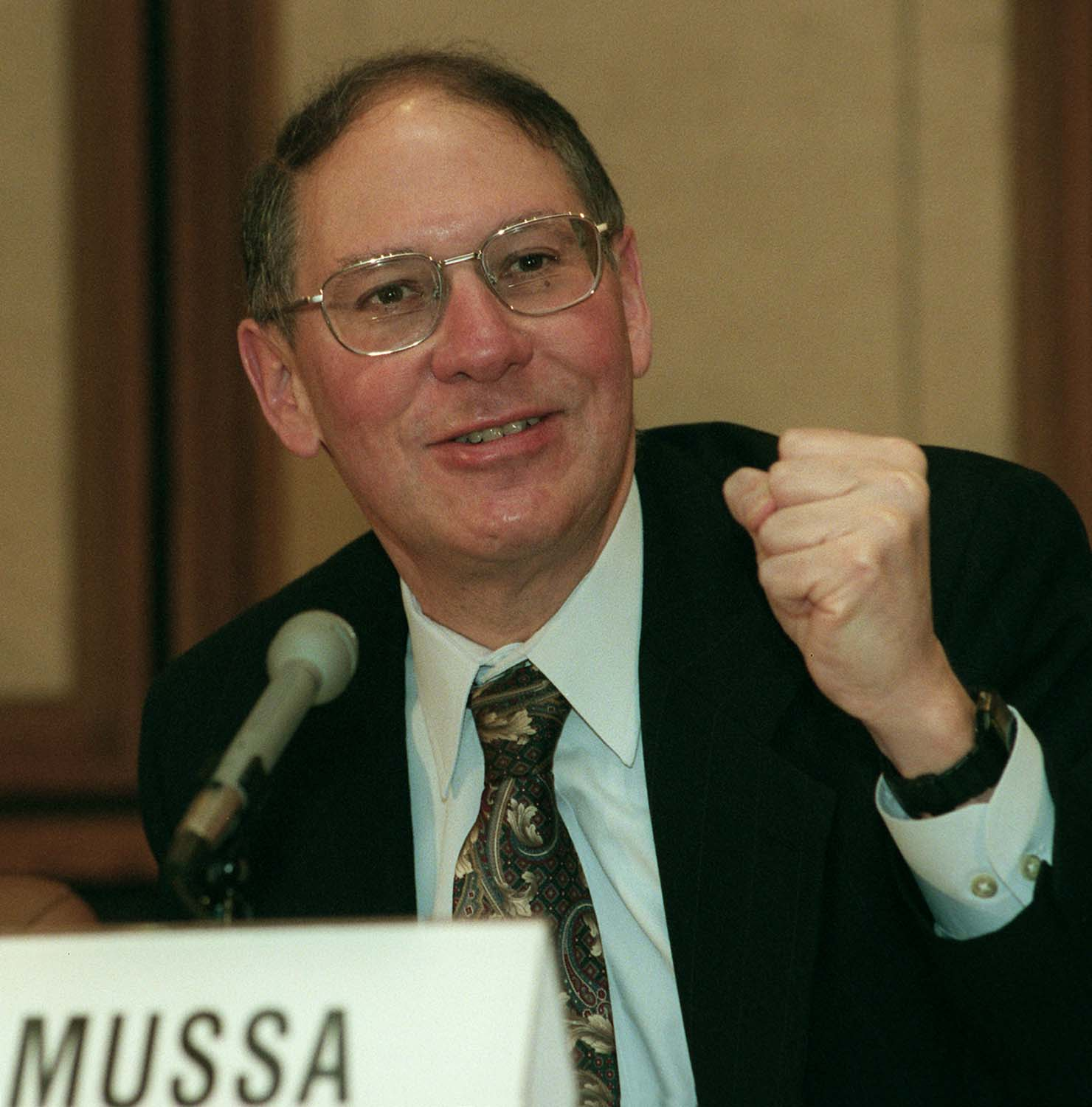
- Mussa in 2000

Chief Economist of the International Monetary Fund
- In office August 1991 – June 29, 2001
- President: Michel Camdessus; Horst Köhler
- Preceded by: Jacob A. Frenkel
- Succeeded by: Kenneth Rogoff

Personal details
- Born: April 15, 1944 Los Angeles, California, U.S.
- Died: January 15, 2012 (aged 67) Washington, D.C., U.S.
- Education: University of California, Los Angeles (BA); University of Chicago (MA, PhD)

Academic work
- Discipline: International economics Macroeconomics; Monetary economics
- Institutions: International Monetary Fund; Council of Economic Advisers; Peterson Institute for International Economics; National Bureau of Economic Research; University of Chicago; University of Rochester

Michael Louis Mussa (April 15, 1944 – January 15, 2012) was an American economist and academic. He was chief economist at the International Monetary Fund from 1991 to 2001 and was a member of the Council of Economic Advisers from 1986 to 1988. He was also a senior fellow at the Peterson Institute for International Economics from 2001 until his death in 2012.

Mussa was a professor at the University of Rochester at the University of Chicago, and a visiting professor at the London School of Economics and at the Geneva Graduate Institute.

Diplomatic posts
Preceded by Jacob A. Frenkel	Chief Economist of the International Monetary Fund; 1991–2001	Succeeded by Kenneth Rogoff
