= Gita Gopinath =

Indian-American economist (born 1971)

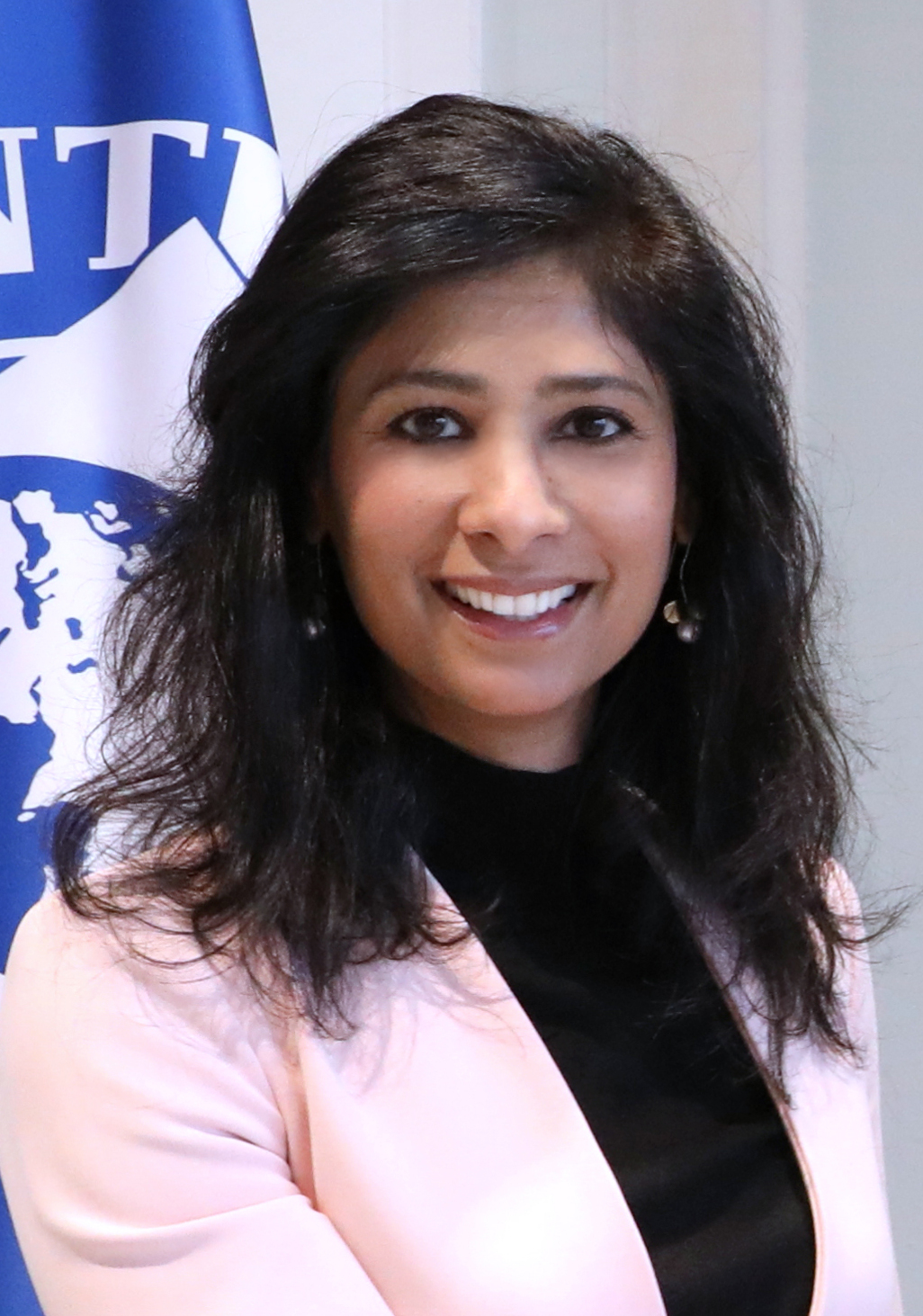
- Gopinath in 2025

First Deputy Managing Director of the International Monetary Fund
- In office 21 January 2022 – 31 August 2025
- President: Kristalina Georgieva
- Preceded by: Geoffrey Okamoto
- Succeeded by: Dan Katz

Chief Economist of the International Monetary Fund
- In office 1 January 2019 – 21 January 2022
- President: Kristalina Georgieva
- Preceded by: Maurice Obstfeld
- Succeeded by: Pierre-Olivier Gourinchas

Personal details
- Born: 8 December 1971 (age 54) Kolkata, West Bengal, India
- Citizenship: United States
- Spouse: Iqbal Dhaliwal
- Children: 1
- Relatives: A. K. Gopalan (cousin)
- Education: Lady Shri Ram College for Women (BA); Delhi School of Economics (MA); University of Washington (MA); Princeton University (PhD)
- Awards: Pravasi Bharatiya Samman

Academic background
- Doctoral advisor: Kenneth Rogoff; Ben Bernanke; Pierre-Olivier Gourinchas

Gita Gopinath (born 8 December 1971) is an Indian-American economist who has served as the Gregory and Ania Coffey professor of Economics at Harvard University since 2025. She was previously with the university from 2005 to 2019 before taking leave for public service. Gopinath served as the first deputy managing director of the International Monetary Fund (IMF) from 2022 to 2025. Prior to that, she served as chief economist of the IMF between 2019 and 2022.

Gopinath had a two-decade-long career as an academic at both Harvard and the University of Chicago (2001–05). At the former institution, she was the John Zwaanstra Professor of International Studies and Economics from 2005 to 2022. She is co-director of the international finance and macroeconomics program at the National Bureau of Economic Research (NBER) and has earlier worked as the honorary economic adviser to the chief minister of Kerala.

During her time at the IMF, Gopinath worked closely with Christine Lagarde on global macroeconomic initiatives. She was credited with naming the worldwide recession of 2020 as "the Great Lockdown". After her tenure as chief economist, Gopinath led the IMF alongside Kristalina Georgieva as her deputy from 2022 until 2025.

== Early life and education ==
Gita Gopinath was born on 8 December 1971, in Kolkata, India in a Malayali family from Kannur, Kerala. She is the younger of two daughters of T.V. Gopinath and V.C. Vijayalakshmi. Her family is related to the late A. K. Gopalan.

She studied at Nirmala Convent School in Mysore. She received a B.A. degree from Lady Shri Ram College for Women of the University of Delhi in 1992 and an M.A. degree in economics from Delhi School of Economics, also of the University of Delhi, in 1994. She further completed an M.A. degree at the University of Washington in 1996. She earned her Ph.D. in economics from Princeton University in 2001 after completing a doctoral dissertation titled "Three essays on international capital flows: a search theoretic approach", under the supervision of Ben Bernanke, Kenneth Rogoff, and Pierre-Olivier Gourinchas. She was awarded the Princeton's Woodrow Wilson Fellowship Research Award while doing her doctoral research at Princeton.

== Career ==
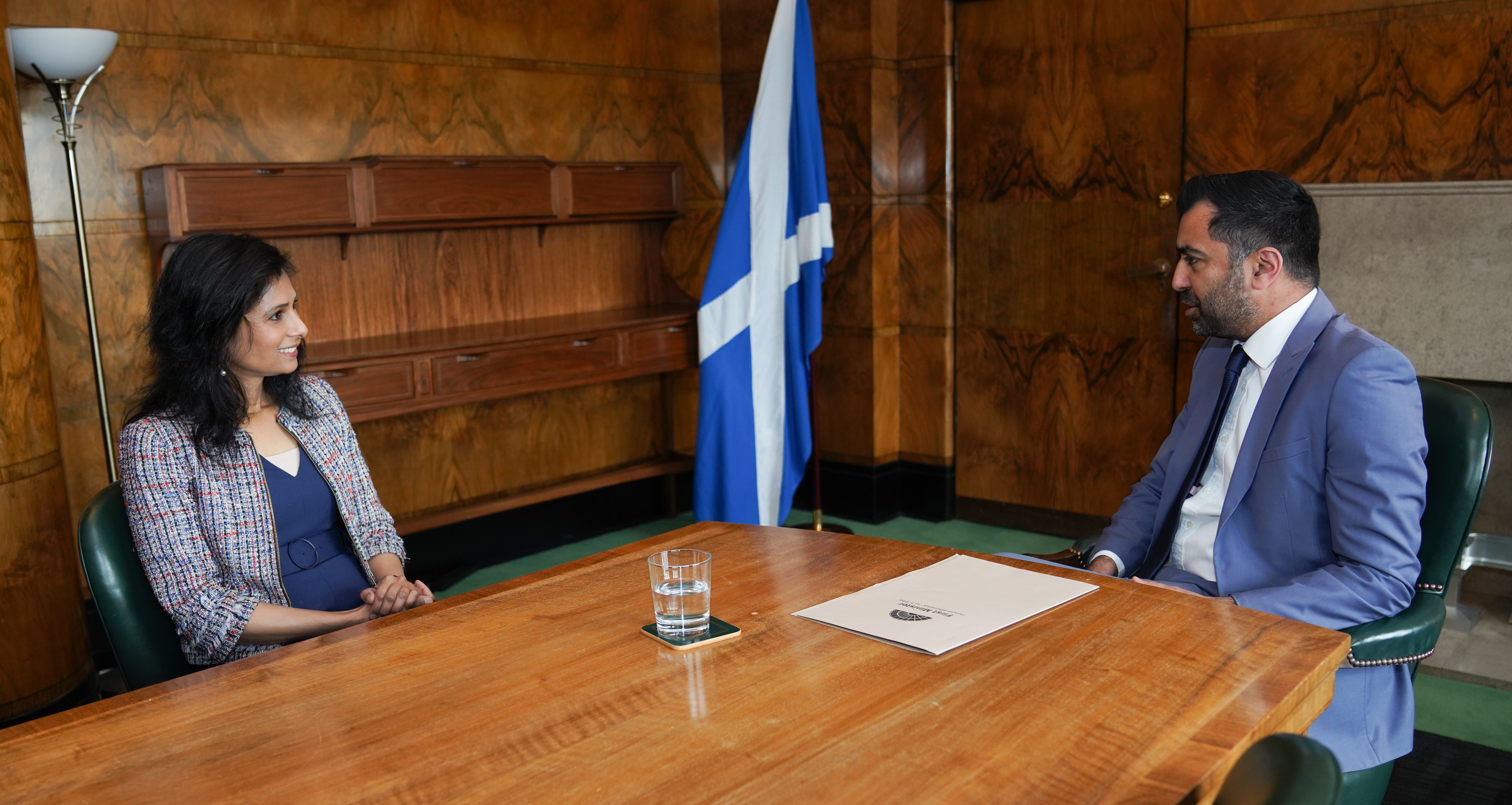
Gopinath meets with First Minister of Scotland Humza Yousaf in June 2023.

In 2001, she joined the University of Chicago Booth School of Business as an assistant professor. In 2005 she moved to Harvard University's economics department, where she served as the John Zwanstra Professor of International Studies and Economics through 2022. In Harvard she co-authored papers such as The Macroeconomics of Border Taxes and Dominant Currency Paradigm.

In October 2018, Gopinath was appointed chief economist of the International Monetary Fund (IMF), becoming the first woman to hold the post. As part of her initiatives, she co-authored the "Pandemic Paper", an international plan on how to end the COVID-19 pandemic that set globally endorsed targets for vaccinating the world. This work led to the creation of the Multilateral Task Force made up of the leadership of the IMF itself, World Bank, World Health Organization (WHO), and World Trade Organization (WTO) to help end the pandemic and the establishment of a working group with vaccine manufacturers to identify trade barriers, supply bottlenecks, and accelerate the delivery of COVID-19 vaccines to low-income and lower-middle income countries (see also: Economic impact of the COVID-19 pandemic).

In December 2021, Gopinath was elevated as the fund's new first deputy managing director (FDMD), the number two position at the fund. Gopinath had been earlier scheduled to return to her academic position at Harvard University in January 2022 on completion of her term as chief economist. Kristalina Georgieva added that "given that the pandemic has led to an increase in the scale and scope of the macroeconomic challenges facing our member countries, Gita—universally recognized as one of the world's leading macroeconomists—has precisely the expertise that we need for the FDMD role at this point. Indeed, her particular skill set—combined with her years of experience at the Fund as Chief Economist—make her uniquely well qualified. She is the right person at the right time."

As the first deputy managing director of the IMF, Gopinath represents the fund at multilateral forums, maintains high-level contacts with member governments and board members, the media, and other institutions, leads the fund's work on surveillance and related policies, oversees research, and flagship publications and the work of senior staff. Gopinath was earlier the co-director of the international finance and macroeconomics program at the National Bureau of Economic Research, a visiting scholar at the Federal Reserve Bank of Boston, a member of the economic advisory panel of the Federal Reserve Bank of New York, economic adviser to the chief minister of Kerala, a co-editor at the American Economic Review, and a co-editor of the 2019 edition of the Handbook of International Economics.

In June 2021, Gopinath was appointed to the World Bank–International Monetary Fund High-Level Advisory Group (HLAG) on Sustainable and Inclusive Recovery and Growth, co-chaired by Mari Pangestu, Ceyla Pazarbasioglu, and Nicholas Stern.

She rejoined Harvard in 2025 as the Gregory and Ania Coffey professor of Economics.

== Honours ==
Gopinath was named one of the top 25 economists under 45 by the International Monetary Fund in 2014 and was chosen as a Young Global Leader by the World Economic Forum in 2011. In November 2016, she received the 2017 Distinguished Alumna at the University of Washington. In April 2018, Gopinath was elected a fellow of the American Academy of Arts and Sciences at Harvard University and the Econometric Society in November. Foreign Policy named her one of the Top Global Thinkers in 2019. In 2019, she was awarded the Pravasi Bharatiya Samman by the President of India Ram Nath Kovind.

In 2021, the Financial Times named Gopinath among the "25 most influential women of the year", the International Economic Association named her the Schumpeter-Haberler Distinguished Fellow, the Agricultural & Applied Economics Association recognized her with the John Kenneth Galbraith Award, and the Carnegie Corporation named her among "Great (American) Immigrants". She was named among the Bloomberg "50 people who defined 2019" and among the "Women who Broke Major Barriers to Become Firsts" by Time magazine. In 2021 Gopinath was selected by the Carnegie Corporation as a "Great Immigrant, Great American".

== Personal life ==
Gopinath is a naturalized American citizen and an overseas citizen of India. She is married to Iqbal Singh Dhaliwal, her classmate from the Delhi School of Economics. The couple have a child.

Diplomatic posts
Preceded by Maurice Obstfeld	Chief Economist of the International Monetary Fund; 2019–2022	Succeeded by Pierre-Olivier Gourinchas
