= 11 USC Section 1113 – Rejection of collective bargaining agreements =

U.S. bankruptcy coed

11 U.S.C. § 1113, "Rejection of collective bargaining agreements", codifies under what circumstances collective bargaining agreements may be rejected in a Chapter 11 bankruptcy.

When a company seeks to reject or modify a collective bargaining agreement, this section of legislation clarifies the circumstances under which such agreements may be rejected.

Section 1113(b) and (c) generally require the following steps:

- The debtor must make a proposal to the union to modify the collective bargaining agreement anytime after filing a petition and before an application seeking rejection of the agreement.
- The proposal must be based on the most complete and reliable information available at the time of the proposal.
- The proposed modifications in employees' benefits and protections are those necessary to permit the reorganization of the debtor.
- The proposed modifications must assure that all creditors, the debtor and all of the affected parties are treated fairly and equitably.
- The debtor must provide the union with such relevant information as is necessary to evaluate the proposal.
- The debtor must meet at reasonable times with the union between the time of the making of the proposal and the hearing on the application to reject the collective bargaining agreement.
- The debtor must confer in good faith with the union in attempting to reach mutually satisfactory modifications of the agreement.
- The union must have refused to accept the debtor's proposal without good cause.

The balance of equities clearly favors the rejection of the collective bargaining agreement.

== History ==
Congress enacted Section 1113 favoring voluntary solutions in response to NLRB v. Bildisco & Bildisco, where the Supreme Court concluded that a debtor could reject a collective bargaining agreement without engaging in collective bargaining and that such unilateral alterations by a debtor would not violate the National Labor Relations Act.

== Explanation ==
However, even with §1113, rejection of a collective bargaining agreement is allowed under this specific procedure.

Once in bankruptcy, a debtor may file a motion to reject the collective bargaining agreement any time, provided that the debtor first fulfills its obligation to make a proposal to the union regarding "necessary" modifications to the collective bargaining agreement, provides the union with relevant information necessary to evaluate the proposal, and makes a good-faith effort to meet and confer with the union regarding the proposal.

The procedure must be followed exactly; the court must schedule a hearing within 14 days following the filing of a motion to reject the collective bargaining agreement, but this may be extended. The court is required to rule on any motion for rejection within 30 days after the commencement of a hearing unless otherwise agreed by the parties. Until court approval of the rejection of the collective bargaining agreement, the debtor must comply with all of its provisions. If the court does not issue a timely ruling, the debtor may terminate or alter the provisions of the agreement pending court action.

The court also may authorize the debtor to implement "interim changes in the terms, conditions, wages, benefits or work rules provided by a collective bargaining agreement" if those changes are "essential to the continuation of the debtor's business, or in order to avoid irreparable damage to the estate".

The debtor's rejection of the collective bargaining agreement does not terminate the debtor's duty to bargain with the union under the NLRA. Even if a bankruptcy court permits the debtor to reject the entire collective bargaining agreement, the debtor may unilaterally implement only those changes in employment contracts contained in its §1113 proposal to modify the agreement.

Terms and conditions unaffected by the debtor's §1113 proposal may not be changed unilaterally without exhausting the NLRA's bargaining requirements.

== Law ==
Under the NLRA, the employer may unilaterally change working conditions after reaching a legitimate impasse in bargaining, and may then implement only those changes that were reasonably contemplated within the proposals that the union had rejected in good faith bargaining.

Courts have recognized the employees' right to strike in situations where debtors have obtained court orders rejecting collective bargaining agreements under §1113, except that an arbitration agreement may be enforced via injunction where the underlying collective bargaining agreement has a mandatory grievance arbitration procedure and the strike is triggered by issues subject to this mandatory arbitration procedure.

A debtor must propose only "those necessary modifications in the employees' benefits and protections that are necessary to permit the reorganization of the debtor".

The legislative history of §1113 strongly suggests that "necessary" should not be equated with "essential" or bare minimum.

Finally, where the debtor's collective bargaining agreement contains a successorship clause and a buyer may be waiting in the wings, the debtor may seek to have the collective bargaining agreement voluntarily modified or rejected before the sale of assets is consummated.

The asset buyer may wish to consider insisting on relief from any such obligation, especially if the purchaser intends to continue operations as a successor under the NLRA. Even in bankruptcy, a company will remain bound by the terms of its collective bargaining agreement unless and until it obtains relief pursuant to the procedures set forth above.

== See also ==
- Collective bargaining
- Bankruptcy in the United States
