= Michael Kuehlwein =

American economist

Michael Karl Kuehlwein is an American economist. He is the George E. and Nancy O. Moss Professor of Economics at Pomona College in Claremont, California.

== Early life ==
Kuehlwein grew up in Delaware. He attended Swarthmore College, graduating in 1980, and then earned his doctorate from MIT in 1988. His dissertation, under Stanley Fischer, was titled "Consumption in the presence of uncertainty".

== Career ==
Kuehlwein began teaching at Pomona in 1987. In 2003, he became the inaugural George E. and Nancy O. Moss Professor of Economics, an endowed chair.

He teaches courses on macroeconomics. His research interests center around consumer spending and saving.

== Personal life ==
Kuehlwein is married and has two boys, Gregory and Duncan.
