= Arthur O'Sullivan (economist) =

American economist

Arthur O'Sullivan (born 1953) is an American economist, Professor of Economics at Lewis & Clark College, and author of college textbooks on economics.

== Works ==
Sole author

- Urban Economics, Irwin / McGraw-Hill Series in Urban Economics, 1990 (First Edition) – 2008 (Seventh Edition). ISBN 978-0-07-337578-6

With Steven M. Sheffrin

- Economics: Principles in Action, Pearson Prentice Hall, 2003. ISBN 978-0-13-063085-8
- Microeconomics: Principles and Tools, Prentice-Hall, 2004. ISBN 978-0-13-035812-7
