= Steven M. Sheffrin =

Academic background
- Doctoral advisor: Stanley Fischer

Steven M. Sheffrin is an economist who focuses on property tax limitations in the United States. He is the director emeritus of Tulane University’s Murphy Institute and a professor of economics. Sheffrin is an expert in state taxation and served as a member on Louisiana's state Task Force on the Structural Changes in Budget and Tax Policy in 2016.

== Education ==
Sheffrin received his undergraduate degree from Wesleyan University (College of Social Studies; Magna Cum Laude with additional honors) in 1972 and his PhD in economics from the Massachusetts Institute of Technology.

== Career ==
Sheffrin began his academic career at University of California, Davis in 1976 in the economics department. He served as the economics chair from 1983–1990 and in 1998 he became dean of the division of social sciences, a post he held until 2008. During his tenure at Davis, Sheffrin founded the Center for State and Local Taxation in 1991 in collaboration with the California Franchise Tax Board and the Board of Equalization, which offered a yearly program in state and local taxation.

While at UC Davis, Sheffrin held several other positions as well. From 1980–81 he served as a Financial Economist for the U.S. Department of Treasury and was on the Board of Directors of the National Tax Association from 1992–95. In addition, in 1993 Sheffrin was appointed to the Fiscal Task Force for the California Business Higher Education Forum where he was responsible for the property taxation component.

== Research and publications ==
Sheffrin’s research focuses on public finance, taxation and behavioral economics, exploring the practical, policy-oriented questions related to property taxation, state corporate taxation, tax fairness and compliance. "He is the author of ten books and monographs and over one hundred articles in the fields of macroeconomics, public finance, and international economics. His book Rational Expectations (2nd edition, Cambridge University Press, 1996) is a highly regarded introduction to this important theory." He has written extensively on California Proposition 13 and was Director of the Proposition 13 Study Project for the Assembly Office of Research for the State of California from 1990 to 1991. Proposition 13 is the controversial property tax law enacted in 1978 that limited property taxes to no more than one percent of the assessed value of a property. As a result of his expertise, Sheffrin is often called upon to discuss the long-term implications of the law and the impact it has had on California's businesses and residents Sheffrin is also frequently interviewed on other local and national tax issues. He has co-authored two college textbooks with fellow economist Arthur O'Sullivan.

== Bibliography ==
- Steven M. Sheffrin; Arthur O'Sullivan; Terri A. Sexton (January 27, 1995). Property Taxes and Tax Revolts: The Legacy of Proposition 13. Cambridge University Press. ISBN 978-0-521-46159-7.
- Steven M. Sheffrin (October 31, 2013). Tax Fairness and Folk Justice. Cambridge University Press. ISBN 978-0-521-19562-1.
