= IMF Economic Review =

- Discipline: Economics
- Language: English
- Edited by: Linda Tesar

Publication details
- Former name(s): IMF Staff Papers
- History: 2010–present
- Publisher: Palgrave Macmillan

Standard abbreviations
- ISO 4: IMF Econ. Rev.

Indexing
- ISSN: 2041-4161 (print); 2041-417X (web)

The IMF Economic Review (IMFER) is a peer-reviewed scientific journal published by Palgrave Macmillan on behalf of the International Monetary Fund (IMF), whose main research publication it is. The IMF Economic Review has a focus on open economy macroeconomics, but also features content on global economic policies, international finance as well as international trade. Its current publication frequency is of four issues per year and its current editor and co-editor are the economists Pierre-Olivier Gourinchas and Ayhan Kose.

== History ==
Prior to 2010, the IMF Economic Review was published under the title IMF Staff Papers. The IMF Staff Papers were first published in 1964, reaching its maximum publication frequency with four issues per year in 1978. According to Olivier Blanchard, the creation of the IMF Economic Review followed the dual motive of filling the gap between macroeconomic theory and practice as well as reviving the IMF Staff Papers, which had become "too inbred" over time, ranking poorly in listings of academic journals.

== Reception ==
According to Thomson Reuters' Journal Citation Report 2012, the 5-year impact factor of the IMF Economic Review was 2.559.

== Sources ==
- Website of the IMF Economic Review
