= Olivier Blanchard =

French economist and professor (born 1948)

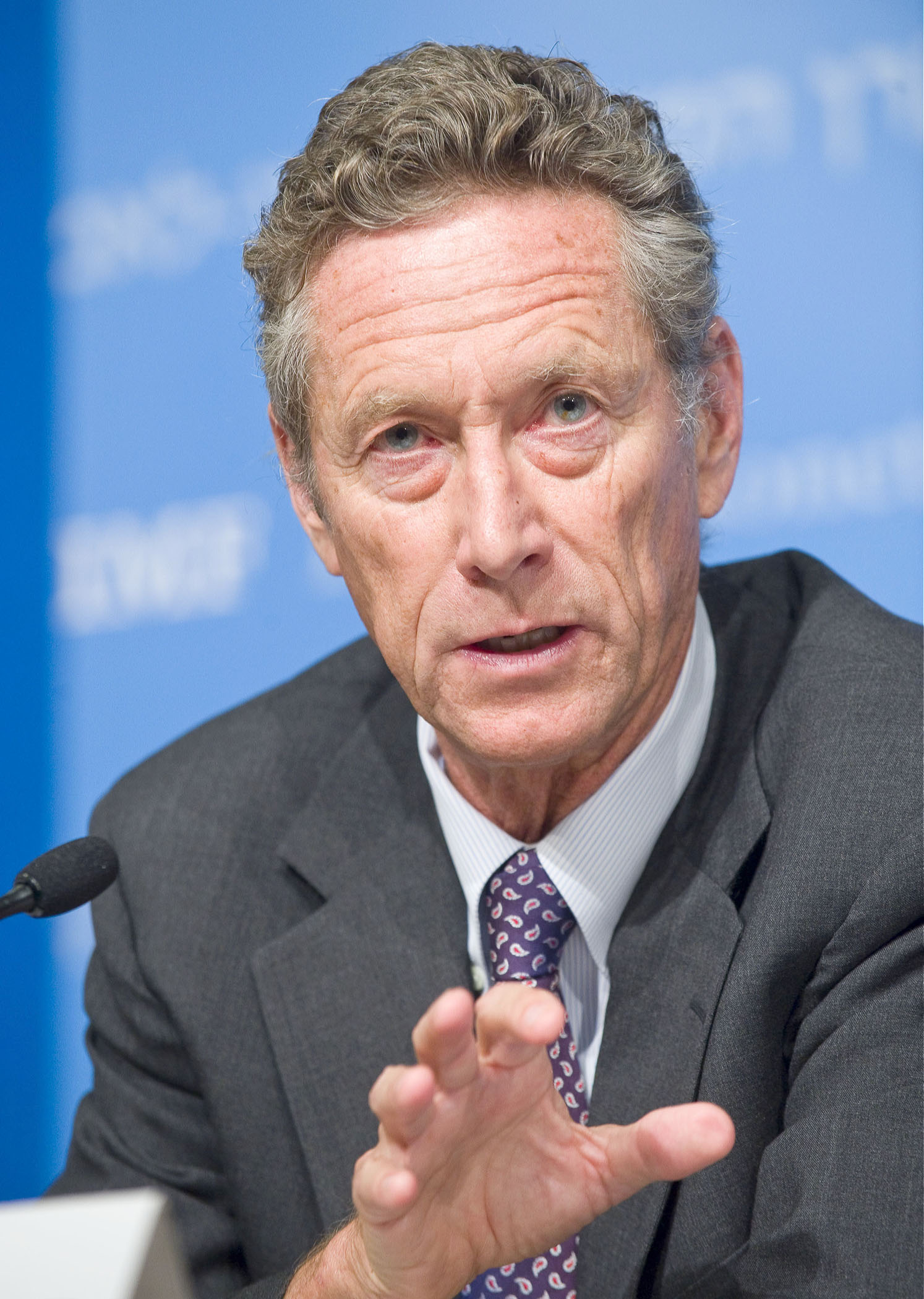
- Blanchard in 2008

Chief Economist of the International Monetary Fund
- In office 1 September 2008 – 8 September 2015
- President: Dominique Strauss-Kahn; Christine Lagarde
- Preceded by: Simon Johnson
- Succeeded by: Maurice Obstfeld

Personal details
- Born: Olivier Jean Blanchard; 27 December 1948 (age 77) Amiens, France
- Education: ESCP Business School (BA); Paris Dauphine University (MA); Massachusetts Institute of Technology (PhD)

Academic background
- Doctoral advisor: Stanley Fischer

Academic work
- Discipline: Macroeconomics
- School or tradition: New Keynesian economics
- Institutions: Peterson Institute for International Economics (since 2015); International Monetary Fund (2008–2015); Harvard University; Massachusetts Institute of Technology
- Doctoral students: Fumio Hayashi; Nobuhiro Kiyotaki; Roland Bénabou; Michael C. Burda; Ricardo J. Caballero; Jordi Galí; Anil Kashyap; Gilles Saint-Paul; Janice Eberly; Charles I. Jones; David Laibson; Pierre-Olivier Gourinchas; Robert Shimer; Augustin Landier; Justin Wolfers; Thomas Philippon
- Website: Information at IDEAS / RePEc

Olivier Jean Blanchard (French: [blɑ̃ʃaʁ]; born 27 December 1948) is a French economist and professor. He is Robert M. Solow Professor Emeritus of Economics at the Massachusetts Institute of Technology, Professor of Economics at the Paris School of Economics, and as the C. Fred Bergsten Senior Fellow at the Peterson Institute for International Economics.

== Education and career ==
Blanchard was born in Amiens (France). His father was a neurologist, his mother a psychiatrist. Blanchard says he was attracted to economics because of the student protests in France in 1968, showing the importance of economics for society’s welfare, and the attractiveness of thinking about the issues through quantitative methods. He obtained a DES in economics at the University of Nanterre in 1972. He then moved from France to the United States in 1973. He obtained a PhD from MIT in 1977, under the supervision of Stanley Fischer and Robert Solow. He was an assistant professor, then an associate professor at Harvard from 1977 to 1983, when he moved back to MIT. He became full professor in 1985, class of 1941 Professor from 1994 to 2010, and Robert Solow Professor of Economics from 2010 to 2020. He has been Robert Solow Professor Emeritus since then. He was Chair of the economics department from 1998 to 2003. In 2008, he took a leave from MIT to be the Chief Economist of the International Monetary Fund, where he stayed until 2015. In 2015, he became the Fred Bergsten Senior Fellow at the Peterson Institute for International Economics. In 2023, he returned to France, joined the Paris School of Economics, and remains a Senior Fellow of the Peterson Institute.

Blanchard has mentored a number of notable students throughout his academic career, including Jordi Galí, David Laibson, Tobias Adrian, Laurence M. Ball, Roland Bénabou, Ricardo J. Caballero, and Pierre-Olivier Gourinchas, among many others.

He is married to Noelle Blanchard, and has three daughters, Marie, Serena, and Julia.

== Research contributions ==
Blanchard is one of the leaders of “New Keynesian economics”, an approach to macroeconomics that captures and extends John Maynard Keynes’s general vision and gives a major role to movements in aggregate demand in economic fluctuations. His research runs from theoretical research to empirical and policy relevant work. He is the author or editor of 30 books and more than 150 articles. According to IDEAS/RePEc, he is one of the most cited economists in the world.

The development, with Nobu Kiyotaki, of micro foundations for the role of nominal price rigidities and the induced role of aggregate demand in a general equilibrium model with monopolistic competition; this model has become the basis for later (and much more sophisticated) models with the same general approach. The derivation of the solution to linear models with rational expectations, with Charles Kahn. The analysis of the co-movements between asset prices and economic activity under the assumption of rational expectations. The identification of demand and supply shocks, with Danny Quah, through long-run restrictions in a VAR representation. The characterization of asset market bubbles under rational expectations, with Mark Watson.

=== On monetary policy ===
The “divine coincidence” result, derived in research with Jordi Gali, that, in the baseline New Keynesian model, stabilizing inflation, which is good on its own, also leads output to be equal to its constrained optimum; this baseline result allows to think about the nature of the trade-off that emerges between inflation and output when other distortions are introduced. The effect of real wage rigidities on fluctuations and the role of monetary policy, with Jordi Gali. The nature of the wage-price spiral, and the conditions under which it can emerge. The analysis of the US inflation episode of the 2020s, with Ben Bernanke. Blanchard has also argued for a higher inflation target for central banks, to decrease the risk of hitting the zero lower bound which dramatically decreases the scope for using monetary policy for stabilization purposes.

=== On fiscal policy ===
The characterization of the dynamic effects of spending and tax changes on both the level and the composition of output, with Roberto Perotti. The effects of debt and deficits on output and welfare in a model in which people have finite horizons. The effects of debt and deficits in an economy where interest rates are low, potentially lower than the growth rate. The way to think about and assess public debt sustainability, using stochastic debt sustainability analysis. Fiscal dominance of monetary policy, with an application to Brazil.

=== On labor markets ===
Blanchard explored the “hysteresis” hypothesis, namely that transitory shocks may have a permanent effect on participation or unemployment, with Lawrence Summers. The channels through which this may happen include union wage setting with insiders and outsiders, and loss of skills or morale when unemployment is high. He additionally examined gross flows in labor markets, and the determination of equilibrium unemployment and vacancies, with Peter Diamond. The theoretical foundations and the empirical evidence for the “aggregate matching function”, examining how hires depend on workers looking for jobs and jobs looking for workers. The nature of the Beveridge curve, i.e. the relation between unemployment and vacancies, with Peter Diamond. The mobility of workers across US states in response to demand shocks, with Larry Katz. The set of optimal labor market institutions, from unemployment insurance to severance payments, with Jean Tirole.

=== On structural change and transition ===
Blanchard has argued that, between short run fluctuations and long run growth trends, there are important evolutions at the medium run frequency, reflecting major structural changes or distributional conflicts. This could for example explain the evolution of the share of labor income from the 1970s. In the early 1990s, Blanchard became involved in transition from central planning to a market economy in Eastern Europe. In a book based on a series of lectures, he discussed how to think about the various privatization options, and about the speed of transition. In an article with Michael Kremer, he argued that the large decrease in output at the start of the transition, despite the shift to a set of market prices, was due to “disorganization”, the failure of supply chains; the mechanism became relevant again in the face of supply chain disruptions during the covid and energy crisis inflation of the early 2020s.

=== On the evolution of macroeconomic theory and policy more generally ===
Blanchard wrote two surveys of the field, one in the 1990s and one in the 2000s, assessing what he saw as progress, and what he saw as dead ends. After the 2008 financial crisis, he organized a series of conferences on the lessons of the crisis, whether and how we should rethink macroeconomics and macroeconomic policy. MIT Press published those conclusions in a series of books, containing short articles by a wide set of important economists, and summaries by Blanchard and different co-editors.

== International Monetary Fund ==
Blanchard joined the IMF as chief economist in September 2008, two weeks before the Lehman collapse. His formal title was “Economic Counsellor and Head of the Research Department".

He stayed until 2015, so that much of his time was spent analyzing the 2008 financial crisis, and later the Euro area crisis. With the support, first of Dominique Strauss Kahn, then of Christine Lagarde, he was given wide range to think about the issues raised by the two crises, and influence the position of the Fund on issues such as unconventional monetary policy, macro prudential policy, fiscal austerity, the pros and cons of capital flows, the effect of the crisis on emerging market countries. There were two episodes in particular where there was intense internal and external pushback.

During his tenure as chief economist, Blanchard reshaped IMF policies. During the Great Recession Blanchard supported global fiscal stimulus. During its slow recovery, he urged a cautious removal of stimulus and advocated quantitative easing.

=== Fiscal austerity ===
In 2012, looking at output forecasts and realizations across advanced economies, Blanchard and Daniel Leigh found that the countries where fiscal consolidation was strongest were also those that underperformed relative to forecasts. They concluded that the adverse effects of fiscal consolidation, the so called “multipliers”, were larger than those assumed by the IMF and the EU commission, and that fiscal adjustment should be slower. This led to a reassessment of IMF advice.

=== Capital controls ===
Blanchard also argued that the IMF view that capital controls were bad should be revisited. In particular, he argued that short horizon capital flows were often costly, both when they came in and overwhelmed the domestic financial system, and when they suddenly went out. This led to a long discussion and a more nuanced position of the IMF stance on capital mobility.

=== Inequality ===
Under Blanchard's tenure at IMF, Jonathan D. Ostry and Andy Berg published their findings that "inequality was detrimental to sustained growth." By April 2014, in the World Economic Outlook, Blanchard situated inequality as a "central issue" for "macroeconomic developments and one that the IMF should take into account".

as the effects of the financial crisis slowly diminish, another trend may come to dominate the scene, namely rising inequality. Though inequality has always been perceived to be a central issue, until recently it was not seen as having major implications for macroeconomic developments. This belief is increasingly called into question. How inequality affects both the macroeconomy, and the design of macroeconomic policy, will likely be increasingly important items on our agenda for a long time to come.

— Olivier Blanchard World Economic Outlook April 2014

== Textbooks ==
In 1989, Blanchard and Stanley Fischer published Lectures on Macroeconomics, a review of macroeconomic theory based on their joint graduate course in macroeconomics at MIT. While not conceived as a graduate textbook, it quickly became one and has been widely used in graduate courses up to this day.

Blanchard has also written an undergraduate textbook, Macroeconomics. The first edition was published in 1997. The ninth edition was published in 2024. The textbook has been translated and adapted in 21 foreign editions.

Among the other books, Blanchard and Herbert Giersch (and other authors) co-wrote in 1985 “Employment and growth: A two-handed approach”, emphasizing the role of both supply and demand, and attempting to integrate the supply focused German approach and the more demand focused Anglo-Saxon approach to macroeconomic policy.

In 2019, at the request of President Macron, Blanchard and Jean Tirole put together an international commission of experts to suggest policies aimed at fighting global warming, improving the retirement system, and improving redistribution. The report, “Les grands defis économiques” came out in 2021.

== Professional obligations and honors ==
Blanchard was Vice President of the American Economic Association in 1995-1996, and President in 2018-2019. He is a fellow of the Econometric Society and was a council member from 2001 to 2007. He is a member of the American Academy of Sciences. He was made a chevalier de la Legion d’honneur in 2008, and an officier in 2016. He is also a commander de l’ordre du mérite since 2021. In 2024 he was awarded the BBVA Foundation Frontiers of Knowledge Award in the category of "Economics and Finance" for his contribution to the theory of business cycle fluctuations.

He was a co-editor of the Quarterly Journal of Economics from 1979 to 1998, a founding editor of the American Economic Journal Macro from 2007 to 2009. He was a co-editor of the NBER Macroeconomics Annual from 1989 to 1993. He was a member of the advisory board of the Congressional Budget Office from 2016 to 2023, and a member of the Brookings Panel on Economic Activity from 1986 to 2023.

Diplomatic posts
Preceded by Simon Johnson	Chief Economist of the International Monetary Fund; 2008–2015	Succeeded by Maurice Obstfeld
Academic offices
Preceded by Alvin E. Roth	President of the American Economic Association; 2018	Succeeded by Ben Bernanke
