= Marc Melitz =

American economist

- Born: January 1, 1968 (age 58)

Academic background
- Education: University of Michigan; University of Maryland, College Park; Haverford College
- Doctoral advisor: James A. Levinsohn

Academic work
- Discipline: International economics, International trade, Foreign direct investment
- Institutions: Harvard University
- Notable ideas: Contributions to the New Trade Theory
- Website: Information at IDEAS / RePEc

Marc J. Melitz (born January 1, 1968) is an American economist. He is currently a professor of economics at Harvard University.

Melitz has published a number of highly cited articles in the area of international economics and international trade, most notably "The Impact of Trade on Intra-Industry Reallocations and Aggregate Industry Productivity" in Econometrica which explores the effects of international trade on the competition within domestic industries.

In addition to his Harvard position, Melitz is also a research associate of the National Bureau of Economic Research, and a research fellow of the Centre for Economic Policy Research, the CESifo’s Research Network, and the Kiel Institute for the World Economy. Before joining Harvard, Melitz was a professor at Princeton University.

Melitz holds a BA in Mathematics from Haverford College (1989), an MSBA in Operations Research from the University of Maryland, College Park (1992) a M.A.(1997), and a Ph.D. (2000) in Economics from the University of Michigan.

In 2008, The Economist listed Melitz as one of the top 8 young economists in the world.

== Work ==
Melitz is best known for revolutionizing our understanding of trade. Elhanan Helpman said that "Marc Melitz has done the most influential work in international trade in a generation. This work provides deep insights into the causes of foreign trade and foreign direct investment, and it has opened up an entirely new line of research that has occupied many scholars in the last decade."

The first explanation for why trade occurs is the Ricardian model of comparative advantage, later formalized in the Heckscher-Ohlin model. Countries have different factor endowments, leading them to be better suited to the production of different goods than the other, and trade allows them to produce as if they were combined. This gives strong predictions about who should trade with whom, which were not seen in the data. Leontief showed that the United States, which had more capital per worker than anywhere in the world, exported products which were more labor-intensive.

Paul Krugman used Dixit-Stiglitz preferences to explain this. Rather than all industries being perfectly competitive, industries featured increasing returns to scale. For example, they might feature a fixed-cost to enter, and constant marginal costs thereafter, with the average cost per unit falling with every unit they produce. Every firm produces one good which is similar, but slightly different from every other firm's, and consumers gain from having more variety. Thus, trade in automobiles between Japan and the United States makes sense – Japan makes Hondas, the U.S. makes Fords, and everyone is better off.

Later, economists began getting access to firm-level data. Rather than firms being identical, as Krugman assumed, they varied widely in their efficiency. Melitz's 2003 paper “The Impact of Trade on Intra-Industry Reallocations and Aggregate Industry Productivity” develops a model of intra-industry reallocation, and shows how the gains from trade can be much larger than previously thought. Firms pay a fixed cost in order to export, leading to only the most efficient firms being able to export. More efficient firms grab a larger market share, and inefficient firms are pushed out.

Melitz, with Gianmarco Ottoviano, extends the logic of Melitz (2003) to economies with variable markups. In economies with more competition, markups – the difference between the price charged and the marginal cost to produce – are reduced by competition. Since these markups are caused by each firm facing a downward sloping demand curve, we can think increasing the size of the market as pushing the demand curve out, and simultaneously making it flatter. Firms with high marginal costs are more hurt by the increase in competition, than they benefit from the increased market size; and vice versa for firms with low marginal costs.

These papers were critiqued by Arkolakis, Costinot, and Rodriguez-Clare in “New Trade Models, Same Old Gains?”, which showed that the welfare impact of intra-industry reallocation is much smaller than believed. In their telling, observing the micro-structure of the economy is irrelevant to finding the macroeconomic impacts. Melitz and Stephen Redding rebut this, however, by pointing out how critical the assumption that firm productivity is Pareto-distributed is to their estimates. Allowing for the distribution of firm productivity to be truncated – in other words, for there to be a finite upper bound for productivity – means that the elasticity of trade will not be constant across time and space. They then calibrate their model to U.S. trade data, and find that the conditions for large gains from trade are met.

Other work by Melitz, with Elhanan Helpman and Stephen Yeaple, has investigated why some firms export their products, while others invest in production within another country. They are able to show how firm heterogeneity can explain the coexistence of firms which engage in exporting, and firms which engage in foreign direct investment. In their model, only relatively productive firms engage in foreign activity at all, and only the most productive firms among those invest abroad. In addition, the greater the dispersion of productivity, the more skewed international commerce will be toward foreign direct investment over exporting.
