= Tobias Adrian =

German and American economist (born 1971)

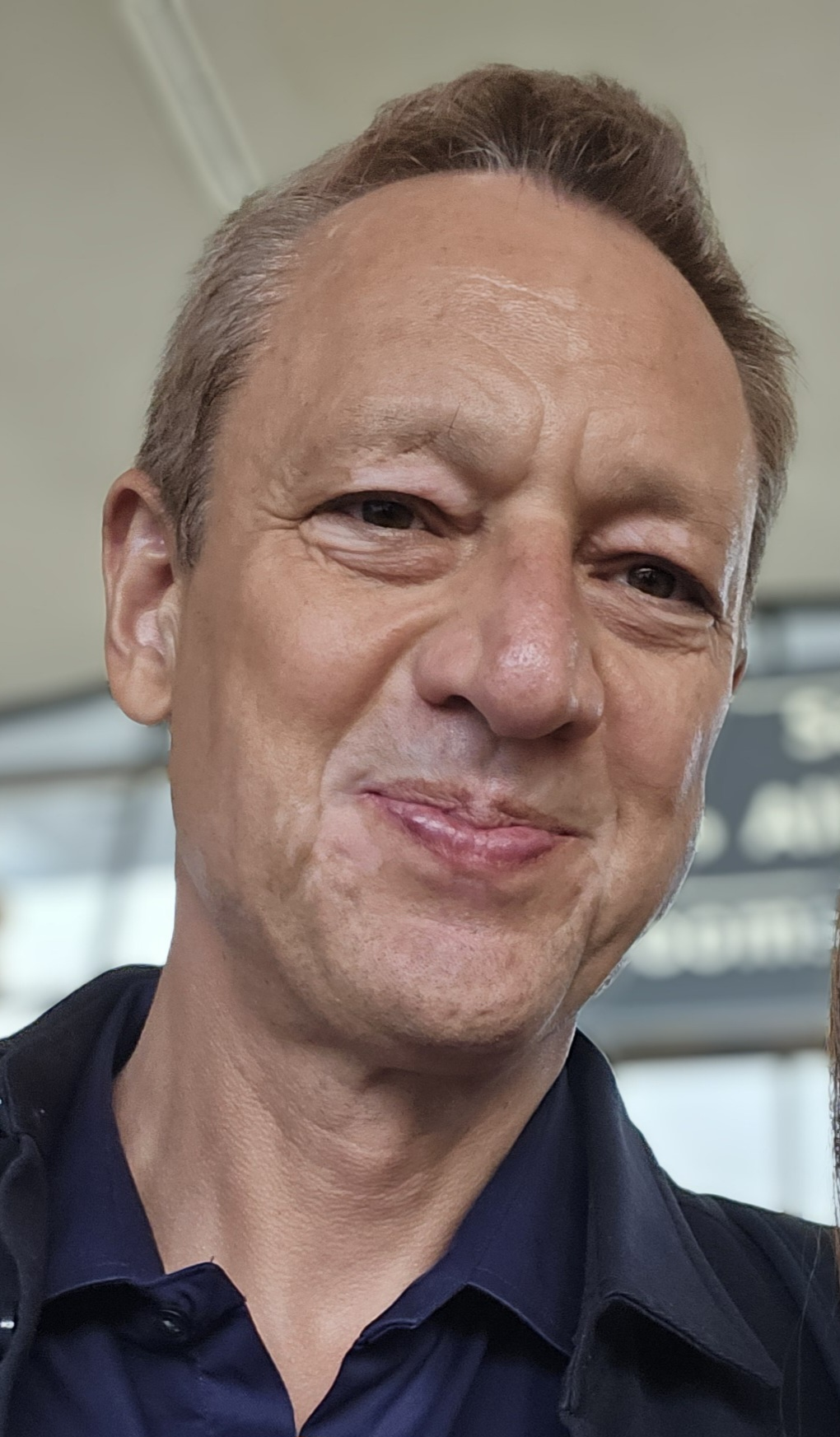
- Tobias Adrian in 2025
- Born: 23 July 1971 (age 55); Kronberg, West Germany (now Germany)
- Citizenship: American; German

Academic background
- Education: Paris Dauphine University (DEUG); Goethe University Frankfurt (Diplom); London School of Economics (MSc); Massachusetts Institute of Technology (PhD)
- Academic advisors: Olivier J. Blanchard; Stephen A. Ross

Academic work
- Discipline: Economics
- Institutions: IMF; Federal Reserve Bank of New York
- Notable ideas: Growth-at-Risk, CoVaR, yield curve
- Website: Official website

Tobias Adrian (born 23 July 1971) is a German and American economist. He was Financial Counsellor of the International Monetary Fund and Head of their Monetary and Capital Markets Department from January 3, 2017 to August 31, 2026. He was previously employed at the Federal Reserve Bank of New York, where he was a senior vice president and the associate director of the Research and Statistics Group. His research covers aspects of risk to the wider economy of developments in capital markets. His work has covered the 2008 financial crisis, monetary policy transmission, and the yield curve.

== Early life and education ==
Adrian was born in Kronberg, West Germany and attended Humboldtschule, Bad Homburg. After studying at Goethe University Frankfurt, Paris Dauphine University, and the London School of Economics, he studied for a Ph.D. at the Massachusetts Institute of Technology, graduating in 2003. His doctoral thesis was entitled Learning, dynamics of beliefs, and asset pricing.

== Career ==
While working at the Federal Reserve, Adrian made substantial contributions to the role of financial intermediaries in monetary policy transmission, with Hyun-Song Shin. He also documented how the inversion of the yield curve can be viewed as a causal transmission channel for monetary policy tightening, with Hyun-Song Shin and Arturo Estrella. This is based on earlier work with Estrella that documented the forecasting power of the yield curve. Adrian also worked on widely adopted yield curve models with Richard Crump and Emanuel Moench.

The Adrian–Crump–Moench (ACM) model provides a regression-based no-arbitrage decomposition of Treasury yields into expectations of future short rates and a time-varying term premium (Adrian, Crump, Moench 2013). The ACM term premium is a standard reference in central bank communications. Extensions separately identify real-term premia and inflation risk premia using TIPS data, and apply regression-based affine pricing jointly to stocks and bonds.

Together with Markus Brunnermeier of Princeton University, Adrian created one of the first measures of systemic risk, the CoVaR. This measure, which takes into account spillover and contagion effects between asset classes and industries, was used to stress test banks following the great recession.

== Research ==
Adrian has published extensively on the topic of market liquidity, including policy effects and its procyclical behavior. He has also written on the importance of the shadow banking system in capital markets, and its prominent role in the 2008 financial crisis.

In macrofinance, Adrian, with Boyarchenko and Giannone, have a Growth-at-Risk (GaR) framework which links financial conditions to the conditional distribution of future GDP growth. "Vulnerable Growth" (in American Economic Review, 2019) shows that the conditional mean and conditional variance of GDP growth are negatively correlated, so that lower quantiles of growth are far more sensitive to financial variables than upper quantiles, revealing a pronounced asymmetry that makes the economy especially vulnerable when conditions tighten. GaR has been adopted as a core analytical tool by the International Monetary Fund's Global Financial Stability Report and by numerous central banks.

Adrian's research with Nellie Liang, Fernando Duarte, and others examines the risk-taking channel of monetary policy: low-interest rates encourage intermediaries to expand balance sheets and assume greater risk, stimulating activity in the short run but building vulnerability (Adrian and Liang 2018). On quantitative easing, Adrian and co-authors show that large-scale asset purchases primarily compress term premia through the portfolio balance channel, lowering long-term rates by 50–100 basis points (2026 NBER Macroeconomics Annual). At the International Monetary Fund, Adrian co-developed the Integrated Policy Framework (IPF), providing operational guidance on the joint deployment of monetary, macroprudential, and capital-flow-management tools for open economies.

On global markets, in joint work with Hyun Song Shin, Adrian documented that dealer leverage is procyclical: when measured risk falls, Value-at-Risk constraints loosen and intermediaries expand balance sheets, compressing risk premia; when volatility rises, constraints bind and forced deleveraging drains market liquidity (Adrian and Shin 2010). The Intermediary Asset Pricing framework, developed with Erkko Etula, Tyler Muir, Emanuel Moench, and Hyun Song Shin, shows that risk premia across equities, bonds, and credit markets are determined by the risk-bearing capacity of financial intermediaries.

More recently, Adrian has studied how financial conditions present asymmetric risks to GDP growth with Domenico Giannone and Nina Boyarchenko. This work led to a novel model for economic forecasting, under which multimodal distributions (allowing both "good" and "bad" outcomes) arise naturally under tight financial conditions. With Patrick Bolton and Alissa Kleinnijenhuis, Adrian has conducted a first empirical study of the costs and benefits of phasing out coal around the world, and documented a large net social gain on the order of trillions. Their work establishes a novel economic foundation for climate finance.

Some of Adrian's research has focused on the impact of digital money and platforms on monetary economics, financial intermediation, and global payment systems. In their 2021 publication "The Rise of Digital Money," Adrian and Mancini-Griffoli introduced a taxonomy that categorizes digital currencies by issuer, value stability, and underlying technology. Building on this taxonomy, Adrian & Mancini-Griffoli (2021) discuss the policy and institutional implications of transitioning to a tokenized monetary system.

A 2023 paper co-authored by Adrian, Rod Garratt, Dong He, and Mancini-Griffoli ("Trust Bridges and Money Flows") introduced the concept of "trust bridges" in international payments. This framework proposes modular interoperability protocols designed to connect domestic payment systems across jurisdictions. The paper suggests that this architecture could improve cross-border settlement efficiency while allowing individual countries to maintain monetary sovereignty, capital-flow management tools, and compliance with anti-money laundering and combating the financing of terrorism (AML/CFT) regulations.

== Selected works ==
- Adrian, Tobias; Shin, Hyun Song (2010). "Liquidity and leverage". Journal of Financial Intermediation. 19 (3). Elsevier BV: 418–437. doi:10.1016/j.jfi.2008.12.002. hdl:10419/60918. ISSN 1042-9573.
- Adrian, Tobias; Ashcraft, Adam; Boesky, Hayley; Pozsar, Zoltan (2013). "Shadow Banking". Economic Policy Review. 19 (2). Federal Reserve Bank of New York.
- Adrian, Tobias; Brunnermeier, Markus K. (June 2016). "CoVaR". American Economic Review. 106 (7). American Economic Association: 1705–1741. doi:10.1257/aer.20120555. ISSN 0002-8282.
- Adrian, Tobias; Boyarchenko, Nina; Giannone, Domenico (April 2019). "Vulnerable Growth". American Economic Review. 109 (4). American Economic Association: 1263–1289. doi:10.1257/aer.20161923. ISSN 0002-8282. S2CID 32943592.
