= David Klein (economist) =

Israeli banker, Governor of the Bank of Israel (1935–2021)

David Klein (Hebrew: דוד קליין; July 15, 1935 – 26 May 2021) was an Israeli economist who served as governor of the Bank of Israel from January 2000 to January 2005.

== Biography ==
David Klein earned a BA in general history and economics from the Hebrew University of Jerusalem in 1959. In 1972 he was awarded a PhD in economics from George Washington University. His thesis was Velocity of Money, Production Costs, and Short-run Price Level Determination.

== Finance career ==
In 1959–1966, Klein worked in the budget department of the Israel Ministry of Finance. In addition to oversight and planning duties, he was involved in the establishment of the town of Arad and the reconstruction of the town of Qazvin in Iran after an earthquake.

In 1966–1972 Klein worked for the International Monetary Fund in the Fiscal Affairs Department. He was responsible for fiscal policy in developing countries.

In 1972–1976, he worked in econometrics as the Tevel Institute of Policy Studies in Jerusalem. From 1976 to 1987 he worked for Bank Leumi Le-Israel as a senior economist and head of the strategic planning division.

In 1987–2005, Klein served in various senior roles at the Bank of Israel and was a member of the management team.

In 2000–2005, he was Governor of the Bank of Israel.
