= Kenneth Rogoff =

American economist and chess grandmaster (born 1953)

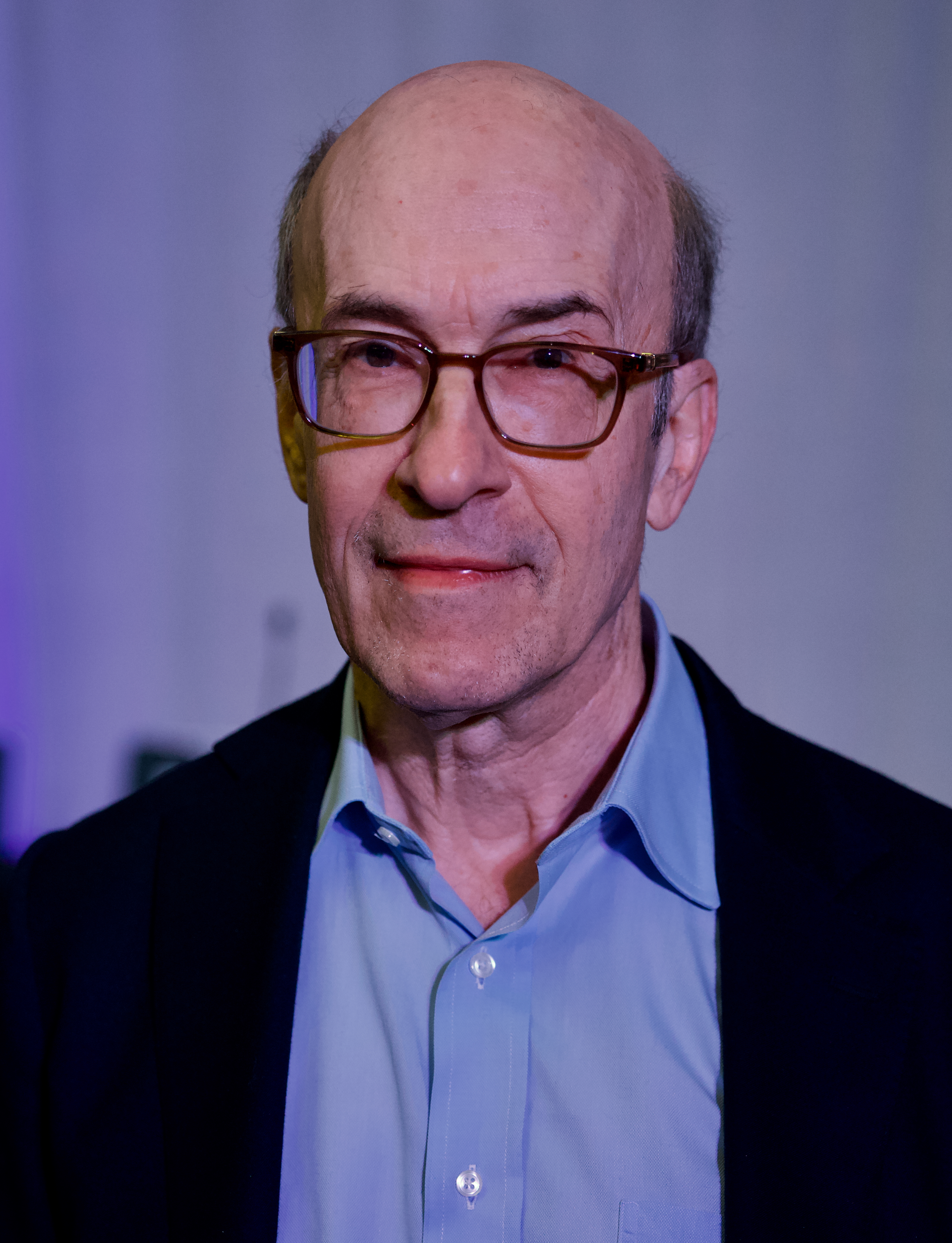
- Rogoff at ASSA 2026

Chief Economist of the International Monetary Fund
- In office August 2001 – September 2003
- President: Horst Köhler
- Preceded by: Michael Mussa
- Succeeded by: Raghuram Rajan

Personal details
- Born: March 22, 1953 (age 73) Rochester, New York, U.S.
- Spouses: Evelyn Brody (m. 1979–1989) Natasha Lance (m. 1995)
- Education: Yale University (BA, MA); Massachusetts Institute of Technology (PhD)
- Website: rogoff.scholars.harvard.edu

Academic background
- Thesis: Essays on expectations and exchange-rate volatility (1980)
- Doctoral advisor: Rudi Dornbusch

Academic work
- Discipline: Financial economics
- Institutions: Harvard University
- Doctoral students: See list: Gita Gopinath; Keyu Jin
- Website: Information at IDEAS / RePEc
- Chess career
- Country: United States
- Title: Grandmaster (1978)
- Peak rating: 2520 (January 1977)
- Peak ranking: No. 61 (January 1980)

Kenneth Saul Rogoff (born March 22, 1953) is an American economist and chess Grandmaster.

He is the Maurits C. Boas Chair of International Economics at Harvard University. During the Great Recession, Rogoff was an influential proponent of austerity.

== Early life and education ==
Rogoff grew up in a Jewish family in Rochester, New York. His father was a professor of radiology at the University of Rochester.

Rogoff received a B.A. and M.A. from Yale University summa cum laude in 1975, and a PhD in Economics from the Massachusetts Institute of Technology in 1980. His doctoral dissertation was titled Essays on expectations and exchange-rate volatility (1980).

== Career ==
Early in his career, Rogoff served as an economist at the International Monetary Fund (IMF), and at the Board of Governors of the Federal Reserve System.

Rogoff was the Charles and Marie Robertson Professor of International Affairs at Princeton University. In 1998 he joined the faculty at Harvard University, and later was appointed as the Thomas D. Cabot Professor of Public Policy and Professor of Economics at Harvard. He also served as Chief Economist of the International Monetary Fund from 2001–2003. He currently is the Maurits C. Boas Chair of International Economics at Harvard.

In 2002, Rogoff was in the spotlight because of a dispute with Joseph Stiglitz, former chief economist of the World Bank and 2001 Nobel Prize winner. After Stiglitz criticized the IMF in his book, Globalization and Its Discontents, Rogoff replied in an open letter. He is also a regular contributor to the non-profit media organization Project Syndicate since 2002.

=== 2008 financial crisis ===
Fellow economist Alan Blinder credits both Rogoff and Carmen Reinhart with describing highly relevant aspects of the 2008 financial crisis and Great Recession.

In a normal recession such as 1991 or 2000, the Keynesian tools of tax cuts and infrastructure spending (fiscal stimulus), as well as lowered interest rates (monetary stimulus), will usually right the economic ship in a matter of months and lead to recovery and economic expansion. Even the serious recession of 1982, which Blinder states "was called the Great Recession in its day," fits comfortably within this category of a normal recession which will respond to the standard tools.

By contrast, the 2008 near-meltdown destroyed parts of the financial system and left other parts reeling and in serious need of de-leveraging. Large amounts of governmental debt, household debt, corporate debt, and financial institution debt were left in its wake. This debt made the normal tools of tax cuts and increased infrastructure spending somewhat less available and/or politically difficult to achieve. Fiscal policy at times even ended up becoming pro-cyclical, as it did in some European countries under austerity policies. In the United States, economist Paul Krugman argued that even the combination of the October 2008 bailout and the February 2009 bailout was not big enough, although Blinder states that they were large compared to previous bailouts. Since interest rates were already near zero, the standard monetary tool of lowering rates was not going to provide much help.

Recovery from what Blinder terms a Reinhart-Rogoff recession may require debt forgiveness, either directly, or implicitly through encouraging somewhat higher than normal rates of inflation, as Blinder described not being "your father's recovery policies".

During the 2010 United Kingdom general election, Rogoff contributed to an open letter to The Sunday Times endorsing the Conservative Party and Shadow Chancellor of the Exchequer George Osborne's demands for greater austerity during the European debt crisis.

=== 2026 Iran war ===
During the 2026 Iran war, Rogoff criticised Operation Economic Outcast as being likely to accelerate dedollarisation, cause China and Europe to expand their own international financial systems, and make China retaliate against the U.S. with its own leverage in rare earths and pharmaceuticals.

== Criticism and controversy ==
In April 2013, Rogoff was at the center of worldwide attention with Carmen Reinhart (coauthor of the book This Time is Different) when their widely cited study "Growth in a Time of Debt" was shown to contain computation errors which critics claim undermine its central thesis that too much debt causes low growth. An analysis by Thomas Herndon, Michael Ash and Robert Pollin argued that "coding errors, selective exclusion of available data, and unconventional weighting of summary statistics led to serious errors that inaccurately represent the relationship between public debt and GDP growth among 20 advanced economies in the post-war period." Their calculations demonstrated that some high-debt countries grew at 2.2 percent rather than the −0.1 percent figure initially cited by Reinhart and Rogoff. Rogoff and Reinhart claimed that their fundamental conclusions were accurate after correcting the coding errors detected by their critics. They disavowed their claim that a 90% government debt-to-GDP ratio is a specific tipping point for growth outcomes. The subject remains controversial, because of the political ramifications of the research, though in Rogoff and Reinhart's words "[t]he politically charged discussion ... has falsely equated our finding of a negative association between debt and growth with an unambiguous call for austerity."

== Chess ==
At sixteen Rogoff dropped out of high school to concentrate on chess. At that time he met Bobby Fischer, who was impressed by Rogoff's "self-assured style and his knowing exactly what he wanted over the chessboard". He won the United States Junior Championship in 1969 and spent the next several years living primarily in Europe and playing in tournaments there. However, at eighteen he made the decision to go to college and pursue a career in economics rather than to become a professional player, although he continued to play and improve for several years afterward. Rogoff was awarded the IM title in 1974, and the GM title in 1978. He was 3rd in the World Junior Championship of 1971 and finished 2nd in the US Championship of 1975, which doubled as a Zonal competition, a half point behind Walter Browne; this result qualified him for the 1976 Interzonal at Biel where he finished 13–15th. In other tournaments, he tied for first at Norristown in 1973 and at Orense in 1976. He has also drawn individual games against former world champions Mikhail Tal and Tigran V. Petrosian. In 2012 he drew a blitz game with the world's highest rated player Magnus Carlsen.

== Memberships ==
- 2004: Council on Foreign Relations
- Economic Advisory Panel of the Federal Reserve.
- National Academy of Sciences
- American Academy of Arts and Sciences
- 2008: Group of Thirty.

== Publications ==
His book This Time Is Different: Eight Centuries of Financial Folly, which he co-authored with Carmen Reinhart, was released in October 2009.

In The Curse of Cash, published in 2016, he urged that the United States phase out the 100-dollar bill, then the 50-dollar bill, then the 20-dollar bill, leaving only smaller denominations in circulation.

His 2025 book Our Dollar, Your Problem explores the global rise of the U.S. dollar and shows why its future stability is far from assured.

== Personal life ==
Rogoff has been married to the TV and film producer Natasha Lance since 1995. They have two children.

== See also ==
- Austerity
- Dedollarisation
- List of Jewish chess players

Diplomatic posts
Preceded by Michael Mussa	Chief Economist of the International Monetary Fund; 2001–2003	Succeeded by Raghuram Rajan
