= Debt of developing countries =

The debt of developing countries usually refers to the external debt incurred by governments of developing countries.

There have been several historical episodes of governments of developing countries borrowing in quantities beyond their ability to repay. "Unpayable debt" is external debt with interest that exceeds what the country's politicians think they can collect from taxpayers, based on the nation's gross domestic product, thus preventing it from ever being repaid. The debt can result from many causes.

Some of the high levels of debt were amassed following the 1973 oil crisis. Increases in oil prices forced many poorer nations' governments to borrow heavily to purchase politically essential supplies. At the same time, OPEC funds deposited and "recycled" through western banks provided a ready source of funds for loans. While a portion of borrowed funds went towards infrastructure and economic development financed by central governments, a portion was lost to corruption and about one-fifth was spent on arms.

== Debt abolition ==
There is much debate about whether the richer countries should be asked for money which has to be repaid. The Jubilee Debt Campaign gives six reasons why the third world debts should be cancelled. Firstly, several governments want to spend more money on poverty reduction but they lose that money in paying off their debts. Economist Jeff Rubin agrees with this stance on the basis that the money could have been used for basic human needs and says it is odious debt. Secondly, the lenders knew that they gave to dictators or oppressive regimes and thus, they are responsible for their actions, not the people living in the countries of those regimes. For example, South Africa has been paying off $22 billion which was lent to stimulate the apartheid regime. They have yet to recover from this, their external debt has increased to $136.6 billion while the number of people in the housing backlog has increased to 2.1 million from 1994's 1.5 million. Also, many lenders knew that a great proportion of the money would sometime be stolen through corruption. Next, the developing projects that some loans would support were often unwisely led and failed because of the lender's incompetence. Also, many of the debts were signed with unfair terms, several of the loan takers have to pay the debts in foreign currency such as dollars, which make them vulnerable to world market changes. The unfair terms can make a loan extremely expensive, many of the loan takers have already paid the sum they loaned several times, but the debt grows faster than they can repay it. Finally, many of the loans were contracted illegally, not following proper processes.

A seventh reason for canceling out some debts is that the money loaned by banks is generally created out of thin air, sometimes subject to a small capital adequacy requirement imposed by such institutions as the Bank of International Settlements. Maurice Félix Charles Allais, 1988 winner of the Nobel Memorial Prize in Economics, commented on this by stating: "The 'miracles' performed by credit are fundamentally comparable to the 'miracles' an association of counterfeiters could perform for its benefit by lending its forged banknotes in return for interest. In both cases, the stimulus to the economy would be the same, and the only difference is who benefits."

=== Consequences of debt abolition ===
Some people argue against forgiving debt on the basis that it would motivate countries to default on their debts, or to deliberately borrow more than they can afford, and that it would not prevent a recurrence of the problem. Economists refer to this as a moral hazard. It would also be difficult to determine which debt is odious. Moreover, investors could stop lending to developing countries entirely.

== Debt as a mechanism in economic crisis ==
An example of debt playing a role in economic crisis was the 1998–2002 Argentine great depression. During the 1980s, Argentina, like many Latin American economies, experienced hyperinflation. As a part of the process put in place to bring inflation under control, a fixed exchange rate was put into place between Argentina's new currency and the US dollar. This guaranteed that inflation would not restart, since for every new unit of currency issued by the Argentine Central Bank, the Central Bank had to hold a US dollar against this – therefore in order to print more Argentine currency, the government required additional US dollars. Before this currency regime was in place, if the government had needed money to finance a budget deficit, it could simply print more money (thus creating inflation). Under the new system, if the government spent more than it earned through taxation in a given year, it needed to cover the gap with US dollars, rather than by simply printing more money. The only way the government could get these US dollars to finance the gap was through higher tax of exporters' earnings or through borrowing the needed US dollars. A fixed exchange rate was incompatible with a structural (i.e., recurrent) budget deficit, as the government needed to borrow more US Dollars every year to finance its budget deficit, eventually leading to an unsustainable amount of US dollar debt.

Argentina's debt grew continuously during the 1990s, increasing to above US$120 billion. As a structural budget deficit continued, the government kept borrowing more, creditors continued to lend money, while the IMF suggested less state spending to stop the government's ongoing need to keep borrowing more and more. As the debt pile grew, it became increasingly clear the government's structural budget deficit was not compatible with a low inflation fixed exchange rate – either the government had to start earning as much as it spent, or it had to start (inflationary) printing of money (and thus abandoning the fixed exchange rate as it would not be able to borrow the needed amounts of US dollars to keep the exchange rate stable). Investors started to speculate that the government would never stop spending more than it earned, and so there was only one option for the government – inflation and the abandonment of the fixed exchange rate. In a similar fashion to Black Wednesday, investors began to sell the Argentine currency, betting it would become worthless against the US dollar when the inevitable inflation started. This became a self-fulfilling prophecy, quickly leading to the government's US dollar reserves being exhausted. The crisis led to riots in December 2001. In 2002, a default on about $93 billion of the debt was declared. Investment fled the country, and capital flow towards Argentina ceased almost completely.

The Argentine government met severe challenges trying to refinance the debt. Some creditors denounced the default as sheer robbery. Vulture funds who had acquired debt bonds during the crisis, at very low prices, asked to be repaid immediately. For four years, Argentina was effectively shut out of the international financial markets.

Argentina finally got a deal by which 77% of the defaulted bonds were exchanged by others, of a much lower nominal value and at longer terms. The exchange was not accepted by the rest of the private debt holders, who continue to challenge the government to repay them a greater percentage of the money which they originally loaned. The holdouts have formed groups such as American Task Force Argentina to lobby the Argentine government, in addition to seeking redress by attempting to seize Argentine foreign reserves.

In 2016, Argentina cancelled its debt with the holdout creditors, which received returns in the order of the hundreds of percentage points.

=== The determinants of external debt crises in developing countries ===
Some of the major risk factors which increase the probability of the external debt crises in developing countries include high level of inflation, relatively large share of short term debt in external debt, denomination of the debt in foreign currency, decrease of the terms of trade over time, unsustainable total debt service relative to GNI, high income inequality, and high share of agriculture in GDP. At the same time, holding foreign exchange reserves is a strong protective measure against an external debt crisis.

== Debt relief ==
37 impoverished countries have recently received partial or full cancellation of loans from foreign governments and international financial institutions, such as the IMF and World Bank under the Heavily Indebted Poor Countries (HIPC) Initiative, see table below. A further two countries, Eritrea and Sudan, are in the process towards full debt relief; Zimbabwe has unsustainable debt but has not made the reforms necessary to participate in the program.

Under the Jubilee 2000 banner, a coalition of groups joined together to demand debt cancellation at the G7 meeting in Cologne, Germany. As a result, finance ministers of the world's wealthiest nations agreed to debt relief on loans owed by qualifying countries.

A 2004 World Bank/IMF study found that in countries receiving debt relief, poverty reduction initiatives doubled between 1999 and 2004. Tanzania used savings to eliminate school fees, hire more teachers, and build more schools. Burkina Faso drastically reduced the cost of life-saving drugs and increased access to clean water. Uganda more than doubled school enrollment.

In 2005, the Make Poverty History campaign, mounted in the run-up to the G8 Summit in Scotland, brought the issue of debt once again to the attention of the media and world leaders. Some have claimed that it was the Live 8 concerts which were instrumental in raising the profile of the debt issue at the G8, but these were announced after the Summit pre-negotiations had essentially agreed the terms of the debt announcement made at the Summit, and so can only have been of marginal utility. Make Poverty History, in contrast, had been running for five months prior to the Live 8 announcement and, in form of the Jubilee 2000 campaign (of which Make Poverty History was essentially a re-branding) for ten years. Debt cancellation for the 18 countries qualifying under this new initiative has also brought impressive results on paper. For example, it has been reported that Zambia used savings to significantly increase its investment in health, education, and rural infrastructure. The fungibility of savings from debt service makes such claims difficult to establish. Under the terms of the G8 debt proposal, the funding sources available to Heavily Indebted Poor Countries (HIPC) are also curtailed; some researchers have argued that the net financial benefit of the G8 proposals is negligible, even though on paper the debt burden seems temporarily alleviated.

The 2005 HIPC agreement did not wipe all debt from HIPC countries, as is stated in the article. The total debt has been reduced by two-thirds, so that their debt service obligations fall to less than 2 million in one year. While celebrating the successes of these individual countries, debt campaigners continue to advocate for the extension of the benefits of debt cancellation to all countries that require cancellation to meet basic human needs and as a matter of justice.

To assist in the reinvestment of released capital, most international financial institutions provide guidelines indicating probable shocks, programs to reduce a country's vulnerability through export diversification, food buffer stocks, enhanced climate prediction methods, more flexible and reliable aid disbursement mechanisms by donors, and much higher and more rapid contingency financing. Sometimes outside experts are brought to control the country's financial institutions.

=== List of heavily indebted poor countries ===
36 post-completion-point HIPC
Afghanistan	Comoros	Guinea	Malawi	São Tomé and Príncipe
Benin	DR Congo	Guinea-Bissau	Mali	Senegal
Bolivia	Rep. of Congo	Guyana	Mauritania	Sierra Leone
Burkina Faso	Côte d'Ivoire	Haiti	Mozambique	Tanzania
Burundi	Ethiopia	Honduras	Nicaragua	Togo
Cameroon	The Gambia	Liberia	Niger	Uganda
Central African Republic	Ghana	Madagascar	Rwanda	Zambia
Chad				
2 post-decision-point HIPC
Eritrea	Sudan			

=== 2004 Indian Ocean earthquake ===
When the 2004 Indian Ocean earthquake and tsunami hit, the G7 announced a moratorium on debts of twelve affected nations and the Paris Club suspended loan payments of three more. By the time the Paris Club met in January 2005, its 19 member-countries had pledged $3.4 billion in aid to the countries affected by the tsunami.

The debt relief for tsunami-affected nations was not universal. Sri Lanka was left with a debt of more than $8 billion and an annual debt service bill of $493 million. Indonesia retained a foreign debt of more than $132 billion and debt service payments to the World Bank amounted to $1.9 billion in 2006. In 2015 the total debt of Sri Lanka is $55 billion. Some of this is due to borrowing to help with infrastructure and some of it is due to corruption. The last time they sought help from the IMF was 2009, they received a $2.6 billion loan. They have yet to recover from the tsunami.

=== G8 Summit 2005: aid to Africa and debt cancellation ===
The traditional meeting of G8 finance ministers before the summit took place in London on 10 and 11 June 2005, hosted by then-Chancellor Gordon Brown. On 11 June, agreement was reached to write off the entire US$40 billion debt owed by 18 Heavily Indebted Poor Countries (HIPC) to the World Bank, the International Monetary Fund and the African Development Fund. The annual saving in debt payments amounts to just over US$1 billion. War on Want estimates that US$45.7 billion would be required for 62 countries to meet the Millennium Development Goals. The ministers stated that twenty more countries, with an additional US$15 billion in debt, would be eligible for debt relief if they met targets on fighting corruption and continue to fulfill structural adjustment conditionalities that eliminate impediments to investment and calls for countries to privatize industries, liberalize their economies, eliminate subsidies, and reduce budgetary expenditures. The agreement came into force in July 2006 and has been called the "Multilateral Debt Reduction Initiative", MDRI. It can be thought of as an extension of the HIPC initiative. This decision was heavily influenced and applauded by international development organizations like Jubilee 2000 and the ONE Campaign.

Opponents of debt cancellation suggested that structural adjustment policies should be continued. Structural adjustments had been criticized for years for devastating poor countries. For example, in Zambia, structural adjustment reforms of the 1980s and early 1990s included massive cuts to health and education budgets, the introduction of user fees for many basic health services and for primary education, and the cutting of crucial programs such as child immunization initiatives.

==== Criticism of G8 debt exceptions ====
Countries that qualify for the HIPC process will only have debts to the World Bank, IMF and African Development Bank canceled. Criticism was raised over the exceptions to this agreement as Asian countries will still have to repay debt to the Asian Development Bank and Latin American countries will still have to repay debt to the Inter-American Development Bank. Between 2006 and 2010 this amounts to US$1.4 billion for the qualifying Latin American countries of Bolivia, Guyana, Honduras and Nicaragua.

=== Getting Africa out of the debt spiral ===
African leaders, finance ministers, and experts were to meet in Lomé, Togo, on May 14, 2025. Their final declarations call for structural reforms, particularly those of national institutions, which must be led by African countries. Effectively combat illicit financial flows, with losses estimated at nearly $90 billion per year, and greater international cooperation.

== See also ==
- Committee for the Abolition of the Third World Debt
- Debt: The First 5,000 Years
- Domestic liability dollarization
- Eurodad (European Network on Debt and Development)
- Haiti's external debt
- Jubilee USA Network
- List of countries by public debt
- List of countries by household debt
- List of countries by corporate debt
- List of countries by external debt
- Odious debt
- Original sin (economics)
- Sovereign debt
- The End of Poverty
- World debt
