= List of countries by financial assets =

This is a list of countries and regions by global financial assets, the total privately owned assets by residents payable in currency, stocks, and bonds.

== Financial assets ==
Financial assets of countries from 2010 to 2025 (EUR billions)
Country or region	2025	2024	2023	2021	2017	2016	2015	2014	2013	2012	2011	2010
World					169,172	154,826	135,711	118,278	111,220	103,299	95,264	82,243
United States	125,913	105,789	88,552	72,314	71,424	65,156	56,456	48,259	42,169	38,693	35,543	32,020
China	39,298	28,338	23,490	17,886	22,469	19,651	14,223	10,544	8,463	6,480		
Japan	14,167	11,553	11,555	12,707	15,196	13,753	12,063	11,716	13,991	15,572	14,172	11,273
Germany	9,420	7,265	5,780	5,175	5,763	5,485	5,231	5,153	4,940	4,715	4,934	4,672
United Kingdom	8,010	5,222	5,421	6,111	7,669	8,562	7,642	5,874	5,605	5,128	5,067	4,669
Canada	7,433	5,310	4,735	3,649	4,664	4,091	4,074	3,570	3,655	3,281	2,711	2,022
France	7,047	4,948	6,300	5,845	5,102	4,869	4,678	4,429	4,228	4,002	3,995	3,830
Italy	6,030	4,988	4,595	3,795	4,168	4,117	3,934	3,897	3,718	3,549	3,655	3,523
India	4,921	3,400	2,607	1,525	1,878	1,622	1,315	1,054	1,043	895	989	651
Australia	4,790	2,862	2,582	2,263	3,209	2,889	2,686	2,458	2,651	2,110	1,953	1,525
Taiwan	4,662	3,947	3,504	2,802	2,622	2,330	2,066	1,785	1,764	1,646	1,623	1,183
South Korea	3,590	2,037	2,029	1,870	2,660	2,494	2,170	1,817	1,761	1,540	1,435	1,200
Switzerland	3,462	2,341	2,224	1,835	2,259	2,164	1,944	1,794	1,744	1,654	1,575	1,239
Netherlands	3,361	2,263	2,079	2,203	2,336	2,195	2,129	2,038	1,984	1,832	1,746	1,523
Spain	3,110	2,350	2,086	1,590	2,090	2,008	1,983	1,879	1,706	1,716	1,777	1,753
Brazil	2,358	1,691	1,831	1,228	1,745	797	1,204	1,133	1,272	1,287	1,224	760
Sweden	1,991	1,505	1,309	1,260	1,341	1,278	1,158	1,041	879	736	739	562
Belgium	1,637	1,276	1,204	1,147	1,311	1,219	1,193	1,090	1,026	940	918	900
Mexico	1,473	1,162	1,371	768	868	934	936	876	867	768	819	561
Denmark	1,477	1,122	1,009	864	837	823	766	665	659	632	587	526
Russia	1,563	1,176	1,145	857	815	607	297	497	453	366	282	198
Israel				757	752	688	553	517	475	482	-	-
Singapore	1,364	1,095	954	710	706	640	588	510	515	435	431	317
Austria	896	679	631	573	637	614	580	540	524	509	498	440
New Zealand	845	679	651	551	530	410	397	159	150	131	124	89
South Africa	841	688	601	379	531	439	502	446	501	176	205	154
Poland	806	607	516	374	428	407	379	370	338	285	281	231
Norway	645	238	208	150	492	428	438	398	414	357	345	302
Thailand	788	322	311	281	534	413	397	306	316	237	211	119
Malaysia	746	395	323	322	471	454	475	422	410	364	348	265
Chile	507	364	351	333	402	297		253	267	228	261	145
Portugal	574		327	285	381	374	366	400	388	384	395	390
Ireland	564		374	298	368	355		335	320	300	294	307
Turkey	505		281	200	315	311		237	248	221	191	197
Indonesia	480		260	210	330	287		244	277	209	169	122
Czech Republic	473		336	231	194	190		153	163	151	136	124
Finland	438		206	194	315	301		252	237	232	240	202
Vietnam	408											
Colombia	354		237	190	240	142		148	160	132	115	82
Greece	351		224	174	255	239		290	259	244	276	287
Philippines	344											
Hungary	276		222	156	148	130		102	99	88	104	101
Romania	261		182	122	120	114		111	84	147	112	91
Pakistan	159											
Bulgaria	154		113	70	64	58		48	45	36	38	33
Peru	120		65	76	109	100		80	81	70	-	-
Slovakia	117		50	41	67	59		52	50	45	41	39
Croatia	106		64	51	55	52		48	48	43	45	48
Argentina	99		43	42	96	86		70	76	70	47	34
Kazakhstan	99		42	9	29	24		28	26	22	17	14
Slovenia	86		61	48	41	39		39	38	41	42	40
Lithuania	84		59	35	37	34		28	24	24	22	21
Sri Lanka	61											
Ukraine				22	36	38		82	77	60	41	29
Latvia	46		33	23	27	26		15	14	12	14	11
Malta	46											
Cambodia	43											
Estonia	58		34	26	25	22		16	19	21	19	23
Serbia	30		13	9	14	13		13	-	-	-	-

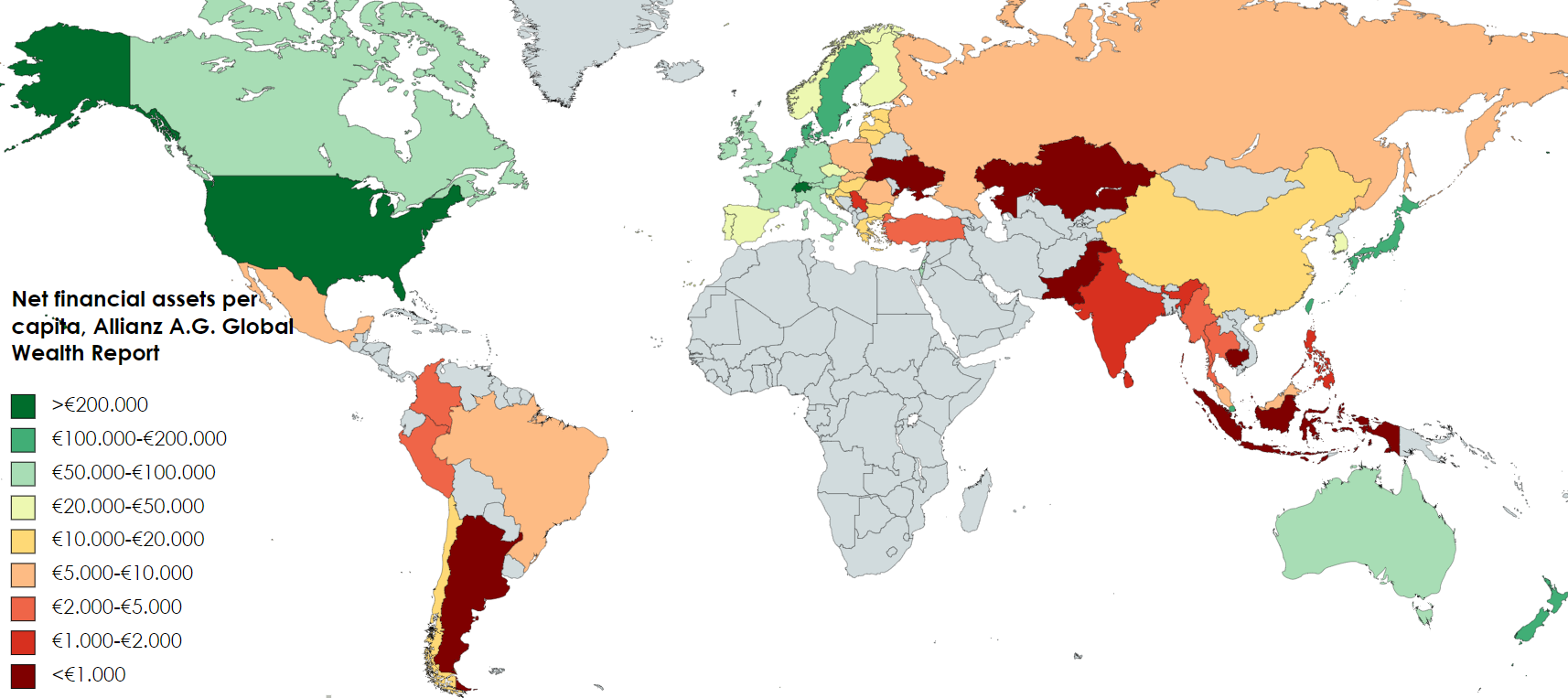
Net financial assets per capita (Euro), Allianz A.G. Global Wealth Report

== Mean net and gross financial assets per capita ==
This list shows 57 countries with net financial assets per capita.

List by Allianz A.G. (2025)
Country	Mean net financial assets per capita (EUR)	Mean gross financial assets per capita (EUR)
United States	311,000	370,160
Switzerland	268,860	397,150
Singapore	197,460	245,920
Denmark	191,560	252,110
Taiwan	167,530	197,900
Sweden	144,470	191,160
Canada	138,090	193,280
New Zealand	133,030	165,510
Netherlands	127,640	189,540
Belgium	110,290	141,510
Australia	110,280	184,530
Japan	91,920	112,720
Germany	86,800	112,550
Italy	83,510	100,960
Ireland	79,800	112,240
United Kingdom	77,180	118,370
Austria	75,760	99,920
France	74,870	106,640
Malta	63,960	88,580
Spain	49,220	65,140
Norway	44,040	119,200
Finland	40,560	78,960
South Korea	39,290	69,240
Portugal	36,420	55,290
Czech Republic	34,740	44,910
Slovenia	32,020	40,790
Estonia	30,790	43,530
Hungary	24,170	28,380
Greece	23,220	33,190
Lithuania	21,260	30,010
Croatia	19,950	27,060
China	19,870	27,550
Latvia	19,720	24,560
Chile	18,730	26,060
Bulgaria	17,840	22,370
Poland	15,970	21,180
Malaysia	11,510	21,750
South Africa	11,190	13,670
Slovakia	10,580	21,530
Romania	10,270	13,550
Mexico	9,100	11,540
Brazil	8,070	11,250
Russia	8,060	10,720
Colombia	4,650	6,920
Thailand	4,500	10,980
Turkey	4,290	5,820
Kazakhstan	2,450	5,040
India	2,400	3,480
Serbia	2,390	4,420
Sri Lanka	2,310	2,700
Peru	2,270	3,610
Philippines	2,060	3,040
Cambodia	1,760	2,560
Vietnam	1,730	4,120
Argentina	1,560	2,180
Indonesia	980	1,740
Pakistan	630	660

== Gross financial wealth per adult ==
This list shows selected countries, sorted by highest financial gross wealth per adult, taken from UBS' Global Wealth Databook. The net average wealth is calculated by subtracting the debt from the mean financial wealth. The adult financial wealth is the total value of financial worth, or the sum of their overall financial assets minus liabilities. Financial wealth takes into account: savings, monetary gold, currency and deposits, stocks, securities and loans. Financial assets include pension and life insurance reserves, which in many cases cannot be withdrawn at one's discretion.

During periods when equity markets experienced strong growth, the relative national and per capita wealth of the countries where people are more exposed on those markets, such as the United States and United Kingdom, tend to rise. On the other hand, when equity markets are depressed, the relative wealth the countries where people invest more in real estate or bonds, such as France and Italy, tend to rise instead. Countries with more aged populations like Germany and Italy would have higher relative wealth, if calculated per capita and not per adult.

* indicates "Income in COUNTRY or TERRITORY" or "Economy of COUNTRY or TERRITORY" links.

Gross financial wealth per adult (2023)
Country	Gross financial wealth per adult (USD)
Switzerland *	448,960
United States *	422,404
Hong Kong	387,963
Denmark *	308,420
Singapore *	245,992
Australia *	230,904
Sweden *	225,252
New Zealand *	225,242
Canada *	224,904
Taiwan *	213,771
Netherlands *	205,080
Israel *	203,689
Belgium *	172,396
France *	168,334
United Kingdom *	168,223
Norway *	148,386
Japan *	145,912
Ireland *	137,362
Austria *	114,960
Germany *	113,737
Italy *	105,265
South Korea *	91,776
Finland *	91,391
Spain *	75,047
Portugal *	60,102
Czech Republic *	48,239
China *	38,503
Greece *	38,228
Chile *	35,512
Hungary *	29,095
Poland *	20,968
South Africa *	19,501
Mexico *	19,149
Romania *	14,378
Russia *	14,350
Kazakhstan *	11,256
Thailand *	10,181
Colombia *	7,637
Indonesia *	6,968
Turkey *	4,187
India *	3,769

== See also ==
- List of countries by corporate debt
- List of countries by external debt
- List of countries by government debt
- List of countries by household debt
- List of countries by total private wealth
- List of countries by wealth per adult
- List of countries by GNI (nominal) per capita
- List of countries by stock market capitalization
