= Global debt =

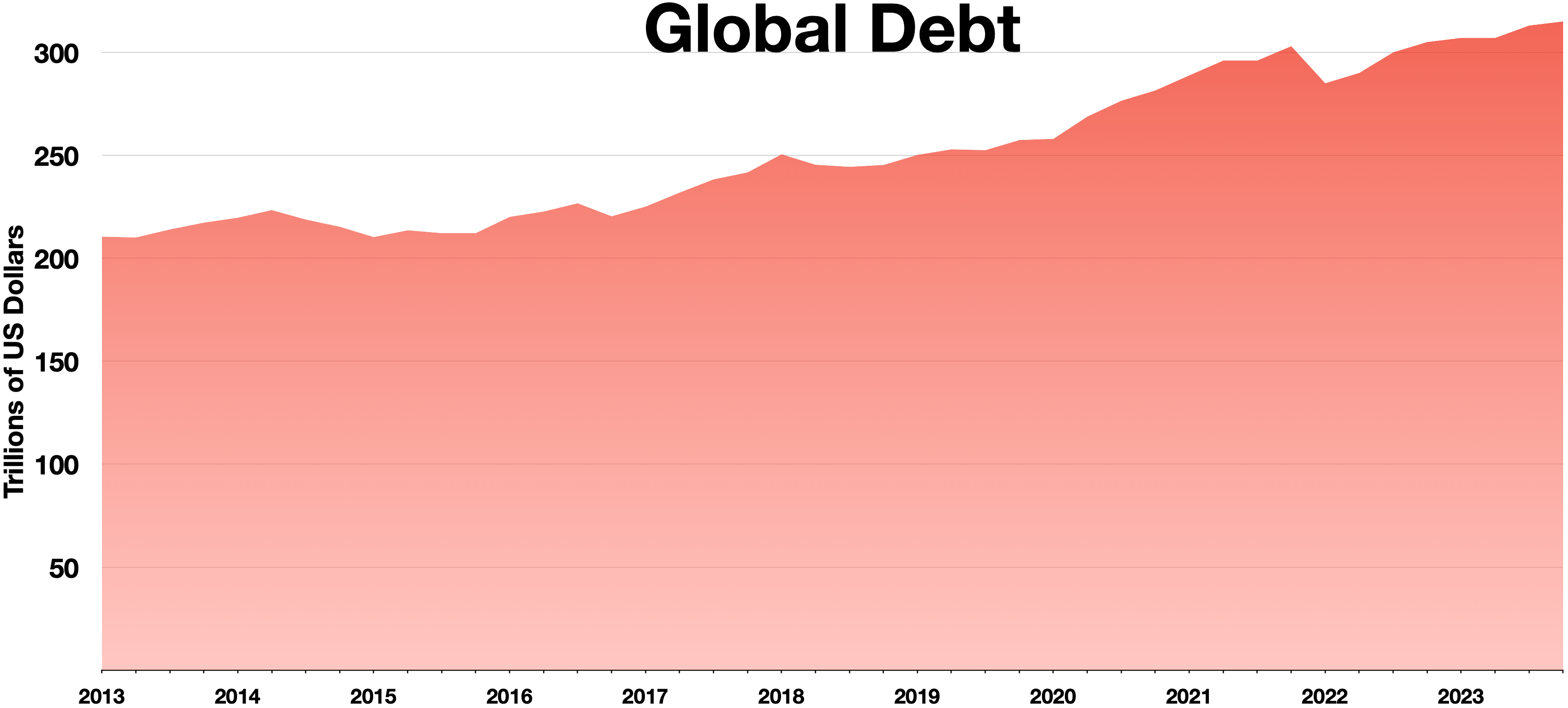
Global debt reached over $300 trillion in US Dollars by 2021

Global debt refers to the total amount of money owed by all sectors, including governments, businesses, and households worldwide.

As of 2022, global debt was the equivalent of 305 trillion USD. This includes debt by both public and private debtors. The total external debt owed by public and private debtors to creditors in other countries amounted to $76 trillion in 2019. The global debt continues to grow. Between 2015 and 2019 global debt increased by approximately 6% per year. According to the International Monetary Fund in September 2025 total global debt was equivalent to 235 percent of global gross domestic product, of which 93% was government debt and 143% was private debt made up of Household debt and non-financial Corporate debt.

== Debt by country and region ==
Region	Country	Public debt % of GDP	Private debt % of GDP	External debt, billion $	GDP, billion $	Total debt, billion $	Money supply, billion $
Northern Africa	Algeria	51.3		5.2	193.6		186.8
Northern Africa	Egypt	89.84		131.6	435.6		365.9
Northern Africa	Libya				48.8		83.5
Northern Africa	Morocco	76.4		65.7	133.1		181.4
Northern Africa	Sudan	270.4		23.0	31.5		10.0
Northern Africa	Tunisia	82.9		41.0	45.6		35.6
Sub-Saharan Africa	Angola	136.8		67.3	124.9		46.8
Sub-Saharan Africa	Botswana	19		1.6	18.4		9.7
Sub-Saharan Africa	Burkina Faso	46.5		4.5	19.6		9.1
Sub-Saharan Africa	Burundi	66		0.6	3.4		1.5
Sub-Saharan Africa	Cameroon	44.9		13.9	45.7		9.8
Sub-Saharan Africa	Central African Rep.			0.9	2.6		0.8
Sub-Saharan Africa	Chad	52.1		3.7	12.9		2.2
Sub-Saharan Africa	Congo, dem rep.	15.16		6.1	64.8		8.0
Sub-Saharan Africa	Congo, rep.	110.1		5.3	16.0		3.6
Sub-Saharan Africa	Côte d'Ivoire	47		25.1	73.0		27.0
Sub-Saharan Africa	Djibouti	41		2.7	3.8		3.1
Sub-Saharan Africa	Eritrea	182.2		0.8	2.6		4.5
Sub-Saharan Africa	Ethiopia	55.42		30.4	105.3		35.8
Sub-Saharan Africa	Gabon	77.3		7.6	22.5		5.1
Sub-Saharan Africa	Gambia	85		0.8	2.2		1.1
Sub-Saharan Africa	Ghana	78.3		31.3	73.9		22.8
Sub-Saharan Africa	Guinea	44		4.2	21.0		5.6
Sub-Saharan Africa	Guinea-Bissau	79.4		0.8	1.7		0.8
Sub-Saharan Africa	Kenya	67.6		38.2	114.7		47.2
Sub-Saharan Africa	Lesotho	54.2		1.1	2.6		1.0
Sub-Saharan Africa	Liberia	58.3		1.5	3.8		0.8
Sub-Saharan Africa	Madagascar	49		4.9	14.6		4.1
Sub-Saharan Africa	Malawi	54.8		2.9	12.0		2.8
Sub-Saharan Africa	Mali	47.3		6.1	19.3		7.0
Sub-Saharan Africa	Mauritania	59.2		5.7	9.3		2.6
Sub-Saharan Africa	Mauritius	99.91		18.5	11.3		18.4
Sub-Saharan Africa	Mozambique	119		20.9	18.1		10.7
Sub-Saharan Africa	Namibia	66.7		8.0	13.0		9.3
Sub-Saharan Africa	Niger	45		4.6	15.6		3.0
Sub-Saharan Africa	Nigeria	35		70.6	510.6		128.7
Sub-Saharan Africa	Rwanda	64.6		8.2	12.1		3.2
Sub-Saharan Africa	Senegal	69.2		17.2	28.4		12.9
Sub-Saharan Africa	Sierra Leone	76.3		2.1	4.3		1.3
Sub-Saharan Africa	Somalia			4.7	8.5		2.4
Sub-Saharan Africa	South Africa	69.4		170.8	426.2		317.9
Sub-Saharan Africa	Tanzania	39.15		25.5	77.5		16.2
Sub-Saharan Africa	Uganda	46.4		17.2	46.4		10.5
Sub-Saharan Africa	Zambia	140.2		30.0	26.7		8.3
Sub-Saharan Africa	Zimbabwe	102.6		12.7	36.4		6.4
Caribbean	Cuba			30.1	107.4		
Caribbean	Dominican rep.	71.5		44.5	109.1		46.7
Caribbean	Haiti	53.9		2.3	20.2		5.5
Caribbean	Jamaica	108.1		18.0	15.7		11.3
Caribbean	Puerto Rico	50.2		56.8	116.8		
Northern America	Canada	117.46	303.91	2124.9	2221.2	9359.5	2723.2
Northern America	United States of Am.	133.92	242.97	20276.0	25346.8	95529.6	28261.7
Northern America	Mexico	61.03	118	467.5	1322.7		593.9
Central America	Costa Rica	67.98		31.3	65.3		36.0
Central America	El Salvador	89.17		18.3	30.7		21.6
Central America	Guatemala	31.5		25.1	91.0		57.2
Central America	Honduras	50.96		11.0	30.1		23.2
Central America	Nicaragua	65.71		12.1	15.8		6.3
Central America	Panama	66.28		108.9	70.5		54.9
South America	Argentina	102.8		253.8	564.3		160.3
South America	Bolivia	78.1		15.4	41.0		43.5
South America	Brazil	98.09		549.2	1833.3		2038.6
South America	Chile	32.54	220.13	193.3	317.6	802.5	298.2
South America	Colombia		30.02	155.2	351.3		204.8
South America	Ecuador	60.9		56.2	115.5		56.5
South America	Guyana	51.1		1.5	13.5		7.6
South America	Paraguay	36.65		19.8	41.9		23.1
South America	Peru	32.48		73.5	240.3		118.0
South America	Uruguay	68.06		43.7	64.3		38.0
South America	Venezuela	304.13		189.3	49.1		26.0
Central Asia	Kazakhstan	26.33		163.0	193.6		68.3
Central Asia	Kyrgyz rep.	68.04		8.7	9.0		4.3
Central Asia	Tajikistan	51.31		6.8	7.8		2.4
Central Asia	Turkmenistan	32.25		5.6	76.6		
Central Asia	Uzbekistan	36.44		32.2	73.1		13.1
Eastern Asia	China		61.4	2349.4	19911.6		42192.7
Eastern Asia	Hong Kong	1		1648.4	369.5		1680.4
Eastern Asia	Japan	254.13	221.94	4254.3	4912.1	23385.3	13813.0
Eastern Asia	Korea, North			5.0	28.5		
Eastern Asia	Korea, South	47.88	271.55	457.7	1804.7	5764.7	2986.7
Eastern Asia	Mongolia	91.3		33.2	18.1		11.7
Eastern Asia	Taiwan	32.65		189.7	841.2		
South-eastern Asia	Cambodia	34.24		17.6	28.0		36.1
South-eastern Asia	Indonesia	79.29		417.5	1289.3		576.3
South-eastern Asia	Laos	82.6		17.2	17.3		6.3
South-eastern Asia	Malaysia	67.43		0.3	439.4		604.6
South-eastern Asia	Myanmar	39.3		13.3	69.3		45.9
South-eastern Asia	Philippines	51.68		98.5	412.0		372.8
South-eastern Asia	Singapore	152		1557.6	424.4		637.9
South-eastern Asia	Thailand	51.83		204.1	522.0		644.2
South-eastern Asia	Vietnam	46.3		125.0	408.9		580.7
Southern Asia	Afghanistan	7.4		3.0	20.1		7.5
Southern Asia	Bangladesh	39.5		67.7	396.5		229.2
Southern Asia	Bhutan	131.2		2.9	2.7		2.7
Southern Asia	India	89.61		564.2	3534.7		3107.0
Southern Asia	Iran	45.6		5.5	1739.0		1434.7
Southern Asia	Nepal	42.2		7.9	36.3		42.7
Southern Asia	Pakistan	79.6		116.5	346.3		188.8
Southern Asia	Sri Lanka	101.2		56.3	81.9		51.7
Western Asia	Armenia	63.5		13.1	14.0		7.6
Western Asia	Azerbaijan	21.3		15.8	73.4		29.5
Western Asia	Bahrain	129.7		50.3	44.2		38.0
Western Asia	Cyprus	119.14	371.78	213.2	27.7	136.1	
Western Asia	Georgia	63.77		20.1	20.9		12.9
Western Asia	Iraq	84.2			297.3		162.3
Western Asia	Israel	71.67		132.5	520.7		553.5
Western Asia	Jordan	88		38.0	47.7		54.7
Western Asia	Kuwait	11.7		47.2	186.6		225.1
Western Asia	Lebanon	135		68.9	18.1		47.1
Western Asia	Oman	71.4		46.3	110.1		56.9
Western Asia	Qatar	72.6		167.8	225.7		257.5
Western Asia	Saudi Arabia	32.4		205.1	1040.2		729.2
Western Asia	Syria			4.8	21.4		12.4
Western Asia	Turkey	39.77	172.96	435.9	692.4	1472.9	467.4
Western Asia	United Arab Emirates	39.36		237.6	501.4		562.5
Western Asia	Yemen	84.17		7.1	28.1		9.8
Eastern Europe	Belarus	48.05		42.5	59.4		20.1
Eastern Europe	Bulgaria	33.08	205.68	43.3	89.5	213.8	84.8
Central Europe	Czech Rep.	37.81	142.41	191.9	296.2	533.9	273.4
Central Europe	Hungary	78.46	139.83	123.3	197.8	431.8	137.5
Eastern Europe	Moldova	34.78		8.5	13.8		7.2
Central Europe	Poland	57.47	122.33	351.8	699.6	1257.8	547.8
Eastern Europe	Romania	47.36	121.9	142.4	286.5	484.9	131.8
Eastern Europe	Russia	19.28	215.46	475.5	1829.1	4293.5	1284.0
Central Europe	Slovakia	60.27	139.81	115.9	118.4	237.0	
Eastern Europe	Ukraine	60.78		129.9	200.1		87.6
Northern Europe	Denmark	42.13	280.16	504.8	399.1	1286.3	271.4
Northern Europe	Estonia	18.46	179.67	23.9	37.2	73.7	
Northern Europe	Finland	69.55	238.56	631.5	297.6	917.0	
Northern Europe	Iceland	77.08	264.24	19.4	27.9	95.1	20.0
Northern Europe	Ireland	58.52	343.73	2829.3	516.1	2076.2	
Northern Europe	Latvia	43.46	110.74	40.2	40.3	62.1	
Northern Europe	Lithuania	47.13	111.28	37.9	69.8	110.5	
Northern Europe	Norway	41.4	316.07	651.0	541.9	1937.3	418.9
Northern Europe	Sweden	121.13	279.79	911.3	621.2	2490.7	550.4
Northern Europe	United Kingdom	130.3	209.82	8721.6	3376.0	11482.5	5411.7
Southern Europe	Albania	77.57		10.9	17.9		15.9
Southern Europe	Bosnia Herzegovina	36.72		14.3	23.4		19.3
Southern Europe	Croatia	88.74	214.78	48.3	69.5	210.8	60.2
Southern Europe	Greece	211.21	139.13	484.9	222.8	780.5	
Southern Europe	Italy	155.82	180.17	2463.2	2058.3	6915.8	
Southern Europe	Kosovo	24.1		3.1	9.7		5.6
Southern Europe	Malta	53.3	334.76	98.2	17.3	66.9	
Southern Europe	Montenegro	107.15		9.7	6.0		3.6
Southern Europe	North Macedonia	60.22		10.6	14.2		9.4
Southern Europe	Portugal	135.19	258.73	462.4	251.9	992.3	
Southern Europe	Serbia	58.37		38.5	65.0		39.4
Southern Europe	Slovenia	79.77	117.78	48.7	63.6	125.7	
Southern Europe	Spain	119.92	209.96	2338.9	1435.6	4735.6	
Central Europe	Austria	83.16	174.73	688.4	479.8	1237.4	
Western Europe	Belgium	114.14	273.51	1317.5	609.9	2364.2	
Western Europe	France	115.08	294.66	6356.5	2936.7	12032.8	
Central Europe	Germany	69.05	180.47	5671.5	4256.5	10620.9	
Western Europe	Luxembourg	24.82	472.55	4266.8	86.9	432.2	
Western Europe	Netherlands	52.49	283.63	4345.4	1013.6	3406.9	
Western Europe	Switzerland	42.38	270.98	1909.4	842.0	2638.4	1538.3
Oceania	Papua New Guinea	46.4		18.0	29.9		8.0
Oceania	Australia	57.33		3115.9	1748.3		2402.2
Oceania	New Zealand	43.1		190.6	257.2		288.1
	World Total			76560.0	96100.1	246000.0	137903.6

Explanation of the table:

Public debt % of GDP: This is the total domestic and external debt of the government and its institutions as percent of the gross domestic product of the country.

Private debt % of GDP: This is the total domestic and external debt of the citizens and private companies as percent of the gross domestic product of the country.

External debt: This is the total debt of public and private debtors to foreign country banks and other foreign creditors. The amounts are in billion US $, calculated by the official exchange rate (a billion is defined here as a thousand millions, or 10^{9}).

GDP: Gross domestic product, billion US $.

Total debt, billion $: This is the sum of all debt, domestic and external, owed by public and private debtors in the country. The amounts are in billion US $, calculated by the official exchange rate.

Money supply, billion $: This is the supply of broad money, or money in circulation, of the country in its own currency. The amounts are in billion US $, calculated by the official exchange rate.

Disclaimer: Most values are from 2020 or 2021. Some values are a few years older. Values from different sources may not have been calculated in the same way. You cannot expect the table to be updated every year because some information is difficult to find and nobody has volunteered to keep the table up to date.

Data sources:

Public debt: IMF global debt database. Data for 2020.

Private debt: IMF global debt database. Data for 2020.

External debt: Data for Australia, Austria, Bahrain, Belgium, Canada, Chile, Croatia, Cuba, Cyprus, Czech Rep., Denmark, Estonia, Finland, France, Germany, Greece, Hong Kong, Hungary, Iceland, Ireland, Israel, Italy, Japan, North and South Korea, Kuwait, Latvia, Lithuania, Luxembourg, Malta, Namibia, Netherlands, New Zealand, Norway, Oman, Poland, Portugal, Puerto Rico, Qatar, Saudi Arabia, Singapore, Slovakia, Slovenia, Spain, Sweden, Switzerland, Taiwan, United Arab Emirates, United Kingdom, USA, Uruguay, European Union, and World are from the CIA world factbook with data from 2019. All other data are from the World bank with data for 2020.

GDP: Most data are from IMF World Economic Outlook Database, 2022. Data for Afghanistan, Cuba, Lebanon, Pakistan, Syria, Ukraine, and World are from the World bank with data for 2020 or 2021. The data for North Korea are copied from Economy of North Korea.

The money supply data are from the World bank with data for 2020.

== Consequences of high debt ==
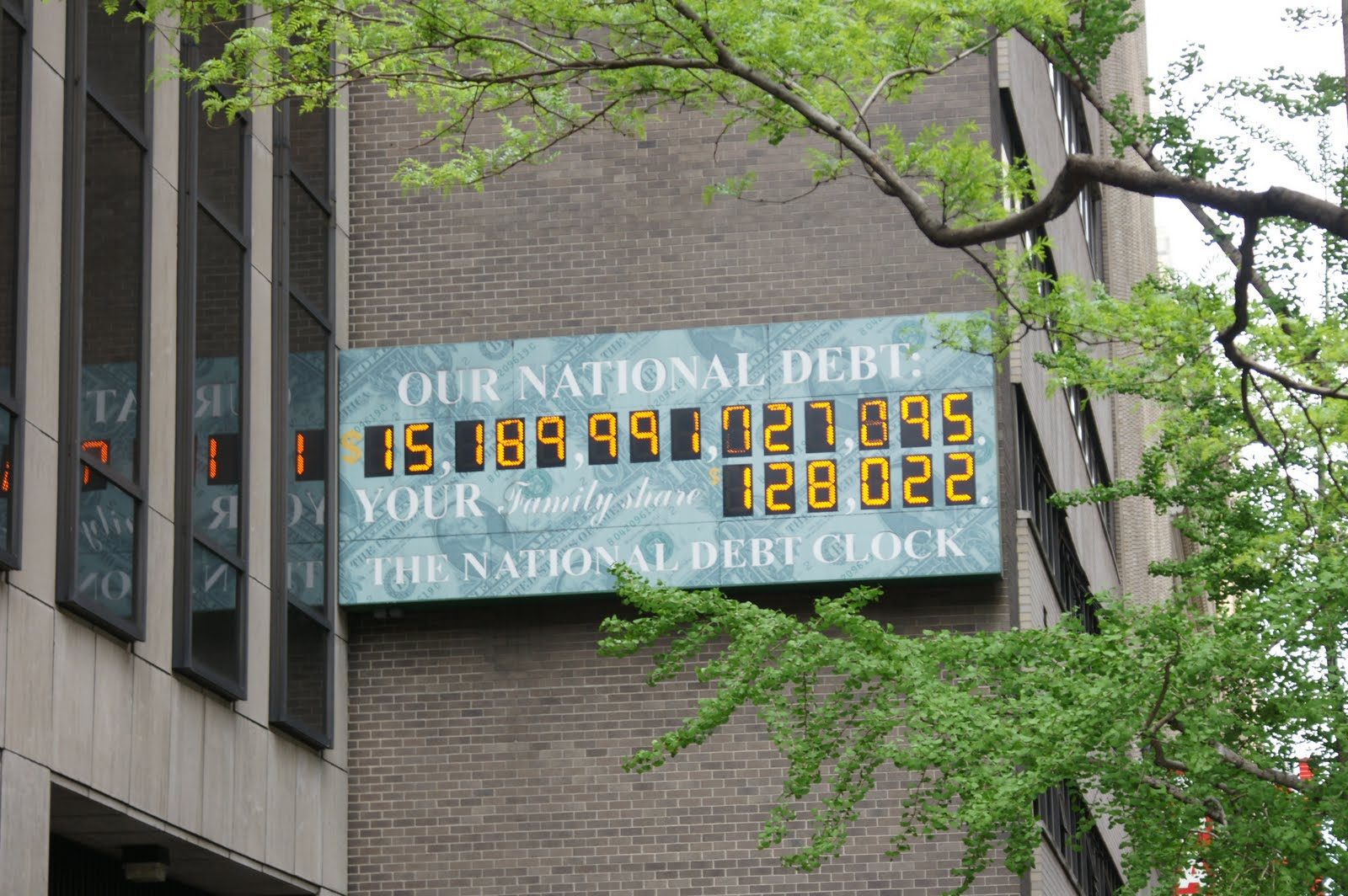
National Debt Clock outside the IRS office in New York City, 2012

There is more debt in the world than there is money in circulation. The ratio of total debt to money supply ranges from 1.7 in Japan and Switzerland to 4.7 in Denmark and Iceland. The ratio for the world total is 1.8, according to the above table. A high ratio of public debt to money cannot be sustained, according to some models. Economists prefer to look at the ratio of debt to the GDP. This ratio ranges from 1.5 in Latvia to 5.0 in Luxembourg. The world total is 3.5, according to the Institute of International Finance.

The reason why there is more debt than money in circulation can be explained by the creation of credit money. When a bank issues a loan, it creates credit money and debt at the same time. The total debt in society and the total money in circulation are both increased by the same amount, which is the principal of the loan. By the time the loan has to be paid back, the debt has been increased by the compound interest while the credit money has not been increased. Most of the excess debt thus originates from compound interest of bank credit.

It may seem impossible to repay all debt when there is more debt than money in the world, but it is theoretically possible to pay back all debt if the banks spend their income from interest payments to buy products and services so that the same money can circulate and be reused for more interest payments. However, critics fear that too much money is hoarded in the financial economy rather than spent in the real economy so that the total debt is spiraling up rather than being paid down. In fact, the global debt has grown by approximately 6% per year during the period from 2015 to 2021.

The debt may be paid down if the rate of economic growth exceeds the interest rate. However, this is unlikely to happen as long as the rate of return on capital investment is greater than the rate of economic growth. A further reason why this is unrealistic is, as environmentalists argue, that perpetual growth on a finite planet is not sustainable.

The debt may be undermined if the inflation rate exceeds the interest rate, but inflation also raises the prices of real estate and other assets, resulting in more new debt to finance housing costs. A high inflation rate leads to low consumer confidence, high unemployment, and economic instability.

The fast growing debt is a consequence of the current financial system that leads to an unbalanced and uncontrolled growth of money and debt. There is a distorted balance between public and private interests with insufficient democratic accountability, according to a Dutch government report. A high level of debt makes the economy unstable with risks of economic crises. The consequences of recurrent crises has been described as unfair because a disproportionate share of the benefits during a financial boom goes to the financial sector, while the general public bears the costs during the subsequent bust in the form of bankruptcies, bank bailouts, unemployment, and home evictions. For example, farmers in India are being forced to sell their farm and land because of inescapable debt (see Farmers' suicides in India).

== Consequences of high external debt ==
External debt consists of government debt to foreign countries as well as private debt in foreign currencies. External debt is different from domestic debt because it affects the trade balance. Interest payments and inflation contribute negatively to the trade balance of the debtor country, while it provides a surplus to the creditor country or the country that issues the currency. While the government can control the internal debt through its monetary policy and fiscal policy, it has fewer means to control the external debt. A high external debt can lead to sovereign default, especially for poor countries with limited export.

The growing level of unserviceable external debt in poor countries is producing a dependent relationship between debtor and creditor countries. Critics claim that this debt dependence is often used as leverage for a neocolonial relationship. This view is opposed by development economists who find a beneficial effect of the inflow of foreign capital, whether in the form of direct investment or loans.

Private banks earn rents from the circulation of money because most of the money in circulation originates from bank credit. An imbalance results if money created in one country is used for circulation in another country. Currency substitution, i.e. payment in foreign currencies, is common in countries with a weak currency. As far as the currency that circulates internationally originates from bank credit, it provides a seigniorage profit and an interest rent in the country where the money is created and a corresponding trade deficit for the country where the currency is circulating or stored. This exacerbates the situation in poor countries, making them vulnerable to increasing external debt, inflation, and economic crises.

Similar problems appear in countries that do not have their own currency. For example, the high external debt and financial crises of Greece, Italy, Spain, and several other Eurozone countries in the aftermath of the 2008 financial crisis was partially due to their lack of monetary autonomy and inability to control the money supply.

== See also ==
- Debt clock
- Debt crisis
- Debt of developing countries
- List of countries by corporate debt
- List of countries by external debt
- List of countries by household debt
- List of countries by government debt
- List of countries by financial assets
- List of countries by credit rating
- Corporate debt bubble
- The Age of Debt Bubbles
