= The No-Nonsense Guide to Globalization =

- First edition
- Author: Wayne Ellwood
- Publisher: Verso Books
- Publication date: 2001
- Pages: 144
- ISBN: 1-89635-746-6

The No-Nonsense Guide to Globalization is a book by Wayne Ellwood, an editor for the New Internationalist. It was first published in 2001 by Verso Books.

It covers topics such as globalization around the world, the Bretton Woods Institutions, developing countries' debt, poverty, the environment, and possible means of redesigning the global economy.

== Reception ==
Sue McGregor of the International Journal of Consumer Studies said The No-Nonsense Guide to Globalization provided readers encouragement on how to change globalization.
