= List of countries by total private wealth =

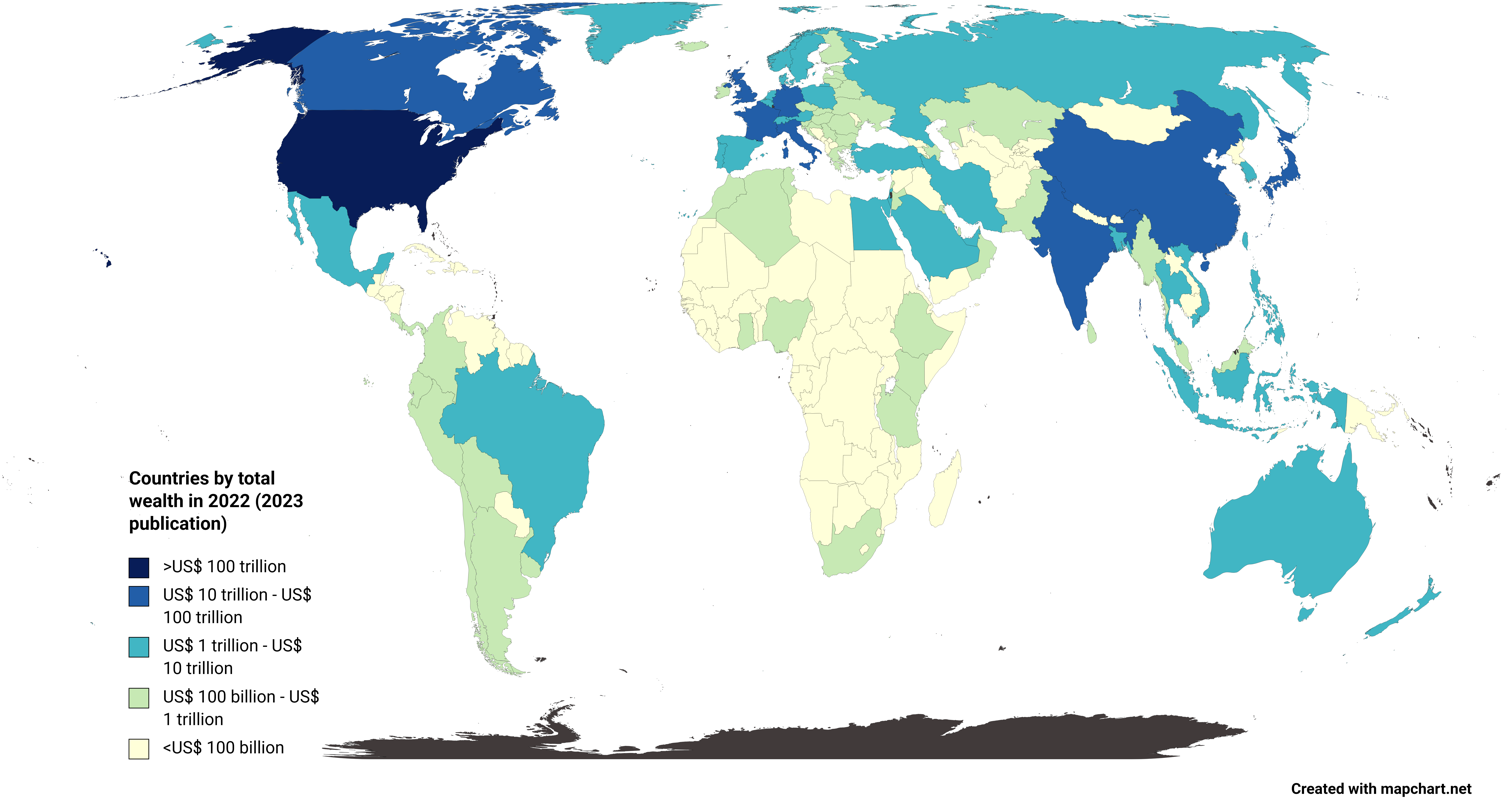
Countries by total wealth, 2022 (2023 publication)

Top 10 countries by total wealth, 2024
1. United States 163.9 (34.8%)
2. China 91.082 (19.3%)
3. Japan 21.332 (4.53%)
4. United Kingdom 18.056 (3.83%)
5. Germany 17.695 (3.76%)
6. India 16.008 (3.40%)
7. France 15.508 (3.29%)
8. Canada 11.55 (2.45%)
9. Italy 11.04 (2.34%)
10. South Korea 10.6 (2.25%)
11. Rest of the world 94.29 (20.0%)

National net wealth, also known as national net worth, is the total sum of the value of a country's assets minus its liabilities. It is the total value of net wealth possessed by the residents of a state at a set point in time. Figures in this article only cover household wealth, and exclude government wealth, which may be substantial, as in China, or negative, as in the UK or US, and so do not show total wealth.

National net wealth is an important indicator of a nation's ability to take on debt and sustain spending and is influenced not only by real estate prices, equity market prices, exchange rates, liabilities and incidence in a country of the population, but also by human resources, natural resources, and capital and technological advancements, which may create new assets or render others worthless in the future.

The most significant component by far among most developed nations is commonly reported as household net wealth or worth, and reflects infrastructure investment. National wealth can fluctuate, as evidenced in the United States after the Great Recession and subsequent economic recovery. During periods of strong equity market growth, the relative national and per capita wealth of countries where people are more exposed to those markets, such as the United States and the United Kingdom, tends to rise. On the other hand, when equity markets are depressed, the relative wealth of countries where people invest more in real estate and bonds, such as France and Italy, tends to rise.

== Total household wealth by country ==
* indicates "Wealth in country or territory" or "Economy of country or territory" links.

List by UBS and Credit Suisse pertaining to total wealth of countries in 2022
Country (or area)	Region	Total wealth (USD bn)	% of world	Wealth to GDP ratio	Population	Wealth per capita (USD)
World		454,385	100.0%	—N/a	7,995,707,304	57,150
Asia and Oceania	Asia and Oceania	177,824	39.1%	—N/a		
Northern America	Northern America	151,170	33.3%	—N/a		
United States *	Americas	139,866	30.8%	5.493	333,287,557	419,726
East Asia	East Asia	125,887	27.7%	—N/a		
Europe	Europe	104,410	23.0%	—N/a		
China *	Asia	84,485	18.6%	4.470	1,412,175,000	59,827
Japan *	Asia	22,582	5.0%	4.918	124,500,000	181,382
South Asia	South Asia	17,581	3.87%	—N/a		
Germany *	Europe	17,426	3.8%	3.797	84,358,845	206,568
France	Europe	15,989	3.5%	5.071	68,042,591	234,984
United Kingdom *	Europe	15,972	3.5%	5.069	67,508,936	236,593
India *	Asia	14,225	3.13%	5.414	1,417,173,173	10,842
Latin America and the Caribbean	Americas	15,071	3.3%	—N/a		
Canada *	Americas	11,263	2.5%	4.937	38,929,902	289,313
Oceania	Oceania	11,201	2.47%	—N/a		
Italy *	Europe	11,020	2.4%	5.669	58,983,122	186,831
West Asia	West Asia	10,920	2.40%	—N/a		
South Korea *	Asia	9,890	2.2%	—N/a	51,628,117	191,559
Australia *	Oceania	9,720	2.1%	5.157	25,978,935	374,083
Southeast Asia	Southeast Asia	9,687	2.13%	—N/a		
Spain *	Europe	8,487	1.9%	5.577	47,475,420	178,770
Africa	Africa	5,909	1.3%	—N/a		
Taiwan *	Asia	5,422	1.2%	—N/a	23,923,276	226,641
Netherlands *	Europe	4,869	1.1%	4.104	17,533,044	277,710
Mexico *	Americas	4,863	1.1%	2.129	127,504,125	38,152
Switzerland *	Europe	4,829	1.1%	5.514	8,740,472	552,313
Brazil *	Americas	4,628	1.0%	1.921	215,313,498	21,505
Russia *	Europe	4,386	0.97%	1.795	144,713,314	30,310
Hong Kong *	Asia	3,493	0.77%	8.384	7,335,200	476,377
Indonesia *	Asia	3,256	0.72%	1.629	275,501,339	11,820
Belgium *	Europe	3,195	0.70%	4.116	11,655,000	274,000
Iran *	Asia	3,034	0.67%	1.707	88,550,000	34,300
Sweden *	Europe	2,335	0.51%	3.860	10,520,520	222,171
Saudi Arabia *	Asia	2,268	0.50%	1.962	36,400,000	62,305
Singapore *	Asia	1,906	0.42%	3.712	5,637,000	338,000
Denmark *	Europe	1,869	0.41%	3.630	5,882,000	318,000
Austria *	Europe	1,794	0.39%	4.381	8,940,432	200,655
Norway *	Europe	1,644	0.36%	2.717	5,425,270	303,044
Poland *	Europe	1,592	0.34%	2.972	37,766,327	42,161
New Zealand *	Oceania	1,426	0.31%	5.181	5,124,110	278,406
Thailand *	Asia	1,421	0.31%	2.134	71,697,336	19,829
Israel *	Asia	1,368	0.30%	2.739	9,593,413	142,595
Portugal *	Europe	1,324	0.29%	4.598	10,271,492	128,959
Egypt *	Africa	1,249	0.27%	2.900	104,258,327	11,979
United Arab Emirates *	Asia	1,242	0.27%	2.189	9,441,129	131,550
Bangladesh *	Asia	1,241	0.27%	2.304	171,186,372	7,249
Turkey *	Asia	1,041	0.23%	1.780	85,279,553	12,209
Vietnam *	Asia	1,017	0.22%	3.043	98,186,698	10,358
Philippines *	Asia	1,011	0.22%	2.501	115,559,384	8,746
South Africa *	Africa	926	0.20%	2.191	60,756,135	15,250
Ireland *	Europe	913	0.20%	2.447	5,123,987	178,235
Greece *	Europe	890	0.20%	4.131	10,445,321	85,212
Central Asia	Central Asia	889	0.196%	—N/a		
Finland *	Europe	792	0.17%	2.952	5,548,321	142,901
Chile *	Americas	779	0.17%	2.002	19,678,432	39,512
Czech Republic *	Europe	770	0.17%	2.366	10,701,234	71,934
Palestine *	Asia	733	0.16%	—N/a	5,378,392	136,334
Kazakhstan *	Asia	720	0.17%	1.761	19,234,567	37,501
Nigeria *	Africa	699	0.17%	1.475	218,987,654	3,190
Ukraine *	Europe	679	0.16%	2.003	36,421,908	18,745
Pakistan *	Asia	678	0.16%	1.671	240,112,345	2,825
Malaysia *	Asia	678	0.16%	1.870	33,456,789	20,310
Romania *	Europe	667	0.16%	2.671	19,038,764	35,032
Algeria *	Africa	601	0.14%	1.473	45,998,112	13,066
Colombia *	Americas	564	0.13%	1.737	52,215,743	10,802
Kuwait *	Asia	564	0.13%	3.008	4,380,326	128,770
Peru *	Americas	519	0.12%	1.662	34,050,342	15,243
Hungary *	Europe	458	0.11%	2.117	9,603,021	47,702
Kenya *	Africa	435	0.10%	2.607	54,985,698	7,909
Argentina *	Americas	420	0.10%	0.698	46,044,703	9,123
Qatar *	Asia	407	0.097%	1.865	2,760,385	147,437
Macau *	Asia	372	0.089%	—N/a	677,300	550,000
Sri Lanka *	Asia	359	0.086%	3.535	22,181,000	16,186
Morocco *	Africa	347	0.083%	2.548	37,108,492	9,353
Lebanon *	Asia	345	0.082%	—N/a	5,296,814	65,139
Ethiopia *	Africa	300	0.072%	1.699	123,438,901	2,430
Luxembourg *	Europe	299	0.071%	2.321	660,752	452,818
Myanmar *	Asia	283	0.068%	4.334	54,321,009	5,212
Slovakia *	Europe	270	0.065%	2.731	5,423,118	49,784
Bulgaria *	Europe	258	0.062%	2.086	6,834,291	37,749
Belarus *	Europe	255	0.061%	1.950	9,157,332	27,858
Ecuador *	Americas	255	0.061%	1.908	18,423,119	13,841
Jordan *	Asia	235	0.056%	3.281	11,285,409	20,823
Croatia *	Europe	230	0.055%	3.440	3,875,643	59,357
Uruguay *	Americas	217	0.052%	1.356	3,422,794	63,422
Costa Rica *	Americas	211	0.050%	1.926	5,180,829	40,711
Oman *	Asia	189	0.045%	2.044	4,576,298	41,293
Slovenia *	Europe	188	0.045%	3.784	2,119,409	88,721
Serbia *	Europe	186	0.044%	3.303	6,664,449	27,922
Tunisia *	Africa	177	0.042%	2.887	12,458,223	14,210
Yemen *	Asia	171	0.041%	—N/a	38,222,276	4,478
Azerbaijan *	Asia	157	0.038%	1.727	10,336,578	15,182
Panama *	Americas	150	0.036%	1.617	4,404,108	34,056
Lithuania *	Europe	147	0.035%	2.105	2,861,203	51,376
Tanzania *	Africa	145	0.035%	1.298	65,498,112	2,215
Latvia *	Europe	141	0.034%	2.727	1,881,231	74,976
Iceland *	Europe	129	0.031%	3.928	387,758	332,711
Bahrain *	Asia	116	0.028%	2.748	1,472,204	78,832
Ghana *	Africa	112	0.027%	1.628	33,475,870	3,346
Cyprus *	Asia	109	0.026%	4.289	1,251,488	87,091
Bolivia *	Americas	105	0.025%	1.907	12,224,110	8,589
Nepal *	Asia	90	0.022%	2.219	30,192,689	2,981
Bosnia and Herzegovina *	Europe	87	0.021%	3.868	3,234,873	26,905
Estonia *	Europe	82	0.020%	1.555	1,365,884	60,042
Turkmenistan *	Asia	78	0.019%	1.398	6,377,645	12,231
Albania *	Europe	77	0.018%	4.581	2,761,785	27,868
Zimbabwe *	Africa	71	0.017%	1.819	15,418,674	4,605
DR Congo *	Africa	71	0.017%	—N/a	102,972,000	689
Nicaragua *	Americas	69	0.016%	2.955	6,948,393	9,930
Mauritius *	Africa	68	0.016%	3.417	1,273,468	53,388
Paraguay *	Americas	68	0.016%	1.337	7,132,530	9,536
Moldova *	Europe	65	0.016%	3.426	2,510,121	25,889
Cambodia *	Asia	64	0.015%	1.956	17,764,289	3,603
Malta *	Europe	58	0.014%	3.336	542,105	107,012
Angola *	Africa	55	0.013%	0.552	36,739,284	1,496
Trinidad and Tobago *	Americas	51	0.012%	1.689	1,534,937	33,245
Uganda *	Africa	49	0.012%	0.853	47,249,585	1,036
Armenia *	Asia	47	0.011%	3.072	2,780,469	16,905
Georgia *	Asia	46	0.011%	2.117	3,688,647	12,472
Cameroon *	Africa	46	0.011%	0.846	28,798,436	1,598
Jamaica *	Americas	45	0.011%	2.552	2,827,377	15,910
Libya *	Africa	44	0.011%	1.298	6,812,341	6,462
Papua New Guinea *	Oceania	43	0.010%	1.208	10,275,546	4,184
Senegal *	Africa	41	0.0098%	1.400	17,196,301	2,384
Afghanistan *	Asia	41	0.0098%	—N/a	41,128,765	997
Montenegro *	Europe	36	0.0086%	4.691	627,082	57,423
Laos *	Asia	35	0.0084%	1.486	7,548,932	4,636
Namibia *	Africa	31	0.0074%	1.941	2,567,012	12,073
Madagascar *	Africa	30	0.0072%	1.488	29,178,914	1,028
Rwanda *	Africa	28	0.0067%	1.620	13,768,431	2,034
Botswana *	Africa	27	0.0065%	1.14	2,588,432	10,430
Zambia *	Africa	27	0.0065%	0.858	20,084,521	1,344
Tajikistan *	Asia	25	0.0060%	2.218	10,092,114	2,476
Kyrgyzstan *	Asia	25	0.0060%	2.484	6,951,283	3,595
Gabon *	Africa	23	0.0055%	1.007	2,458,673	9,355
Mali *	Africa	22	0.0053%	0.926	22,593,871	973
Sudan *	Africa	22	0.0053%	0.360	48,109,347	457
Malawi *	Africa	22	0.0053%	1.565	20,541,789	1,071
Equatorial Guinea *	Africa	20	0.0048%	1.179	1,696,428	11,791
Syria *	Asia	18	0.0043%	—N/a	21,324,187	844
Guinea *	Africa	18	0.0043%	1.139	13,859,102	1,299
Bahamas *	Americas	16	0.0038%	2.125	407,381	39,313
Burkina Faso *	Africa	16	0.0038%	0.813	12,998,564	1,231
Mozambique *	Africa	16	0.0038%	0.788	33,897,452	472
Barbados *	Americas	16	0.0038%	2.688	281,895	56,790
Mongolia *	Asia	15	0.0036%	0.857	3,457,987	4,338
Benin *	Africa	15	0.0036%	0.834	13,754,321	2,976
Liberia *	Africa	14	0.0033%	1.628	5,214,889	2,686
Niger *	Africa	13	0.0031%	1.637	26,912,003	483
Brunei *	Asia	12	0.0029%	2.537	452,981	26,508
Fiji *	Oceania	12	0.0029%	0.707	924,871	12,975
Chad *	Africa	10	0.0024%	1.241	17,482,109	572
Maldives *	Asia	10	0.0024%	—N/a	521,938	19,158
Congo *	Africa	6	0.0014%	—N/a	6,102,814	984
Mauritania *	Africa	6	0.0014%	0.789	4,823,119	1,243
Guyana *	Americas	6	0.0014%	0.966	816,209	7,352
Togo *	Africa	6	0.0014%	0.911	8,849,204	678
Eritrea *	Africa	5	0.0012%	0.774	3,684,118	1,357
Haiti *	Americas	5	0.0012%	0.349	11,585,874	432
Seychelles *	Africa	4	0.00096%	2.348	107,118	37,329
Burundi *	Africa	4	0.00096%	0.996	12,887,004	310
Sierra Leone *	Africa	4	0.00096%	0.728	8,420,641	475
Timor-Leste *	Asia	4	0.00096%	1.487	1,364,931	2,933
Belize *	Americas	3	0.00072%	1.064	419,198	7,154
Gambia *	Africa	3	0.00072%	1.095	2,759,452	1,087
Central African Republic *	Africa	2	0.00048%	0.901	5,833,172	343
Comoros *	Africa	2	0.00048%	1.716	907,321	2,204
Djibouti *	Africa	2	0.00048%	0.602	1,120,456	1,786
Guinea-Bissau *	Africa	2	0.00048%	1.493	2,089,315	957
Lesotho *	Africa	2	0.00048%	0.842	2,175,418	919
Suriname *	Americas	2	0.00048%	0.541	618,040	3,238
São Tomé and Príncipe *	Africa	2	0.00048%	—N/a	231,856	8,626

== Countries ranking through time ==
The following table ranks the 30 countries with the largest national net wealth from 2000 to 2020, according to UBS and Credit Suisse S.A. (August 2023).

The 30 largest countries by net national wealth (in billions USD)
Country	Peak		Historical data					Peak to 2000 ratio
Country	Value	Year	2020	2015	2010	2005	2000	Peak to 2000 ratio
World	465,666	2021	422,718	297,743	252,084	182,218	117,825	3.952
United States	145,793	2021	126,300	87,959	64,661	62,634	43,423	3.358
China	85,947	2021	73,866	46,535	25,493	8,522	3,704	23.204
Japan	29,718	2011	26,744	21,519	28,640	19,476	19,404	1.532
Germany	18,412	2021	18,053	12,009	11,934	9,073	6,160	2.989
United Kingdom	16,741	2021	15,454	13,978	11,199	10,949	6,565	2.550
France	16,326	2020	16,326	11,594	13,526	9,679	4,704	3.471
India	15,365	2022	12,688	8,948	6,810	3,266	1,553	9.894
Italy	12,820	2007	12,176	10,506	11,545	9,457	5,522	2.322
Canada	12,501	2021	10,586	6,930	6,832	4,363	2,613	4.784
Australia	10,734	2021	9,268	6,424	6,662	3,480	1,500	7.156
Spain	10,296	2007	8,759	6,177	8,701	6,905	2,497	4.123
South Korea	9,946	2021	9,625	6,128	4,744	3,508	1,721	5.779
Taiwan	5,776	2021	4,920	3,514	2,628	1,883	1,437	4.019
Netherlands	5,447	2020	5,447	3,255	3,323	2,524	1,591	3.424
Switzerland	4,893	2021	4,673	3,428	2,892	1,737	1,273	3.844
Mexico	4,863	2022	3,767	2,659	2,261	1,563	828	5.873
Brazil	4,628	2022	3,092	2,398	3,128	1,064	646	7.164
Russia	4,386	2022	3,177	1,824	2,165	869	–	–
Belgium	3,544	2020	3,544	2,531	2,565	1,826	1,110	3.193
Hong Kong	3,495	2021	3,446	2,548	1,588	976	871	4.013
Indonesia	3,256	2022	3,087	1,899	1,359	704	364	8.945
Iran	3,034	2022	1,443	–	–	–	–	–
Sweden	2,865	2021	2,742	1,783	1,628	966	522	5.489
Saudi Arabia	2,268	2022	1,905	1,437	–	620	415	5.465
Denmark	1,998	2021	1,793	1,055	1,022	799	451	4.430
Turkey	1,970	2013	1,509	1,777	1,718	1,034	525	3.752
Singapore	1,906	2022	1,637	1,075	–	–	324	5.883
Austria	1,855	2020	1,855	1,408	1,460	1,067	719	2.580
New Zealand	1,658	2021	1,436	–	–	–	–	–
Norway	1,644	2022	–	–	988	–	336	4.893
Poland	–	–	1,465	993	936	622	–	–
Egypt	–	–	–	1,035	–	–	–	–
Thailand	–	–	–	1,000	926	–	–	–
Greece	–	–	–	–	1,252	1,020	618	–
Portugal	–	–	–	–	958	731	422	–
Ireland	–	–	–	–	–	696	336	–

== Shares of global wealth ==
The following table shows the share of global wealth held by the ten wealthiest countries, measured by net national wealth, for the given years. The share of a country's global wealth that is 5% or greater in a given year is in bold.

Shares of global wealth (%) of the ten wealthiest countries by net national wealth for 2000–22
Year	Australia	Canada	China	France	Germany	India	Italy	Japan	South Korea	Spain	United Kingdom	United States	Aggregate share of the top 10
2000	—	2.2%	3.1%	4.0%	**5.2%**	—	4.7%	**16.5%**	1.5%	2.1%	**5.6%**	**36.9%**	**81.8%**
2001	—	2.1%	3.6%	4.0%	**5.2%**	—	4.6%	**14.1%**	1.5%	2.3%	**5.6%**	**38.8%**	**81.8%**
2002	—	2.0%	3.7%	4.6%	**5.5%**	—	**5.3%**	**13.8%**	1.7%	2.9%	**6.1%**	**35.1%**	**80.7%**
2003	1.9%	2.2%	3.7%	**5.2%**	**5.8%**	—	**5.7%**	**12.9%**	—	3.5%	**6.2%**	**32.8%**	**79.9%**
2004	1.9%	2.2%	3.9%	**5.6%**	**5.7%**	—	**5.7%**	**11.5%**	—	3.9%	**6.5%**	**32.5%**	**79.4%**
2005	—	2.4%	4.7%	**5.3%**	**5.0%**	—	**5.2%**	**10.7%**	1.9%	3.8%	**6.0%**	**34.4%**	**79.4%**
2006	2.0%	2.3%	**5.0%**	**5.8%**	**5.0%**	—	**5.5%**	**9.5%**	—	4.2%	**6.4%**	**32.3%**	**78.0%**
2007	2.3%	2.6%	**6.0%**	**6.1%**	**5.3%**	—	**5.5%**	**8.6%**	—	4.4%	**6.2%**	**29.3%**	**76.3%**
2008	—	2.2%	**8.2%**	**6.0%**	**5.4%**	2.2%	**5.6%**	**11.2%**	—	4.4%	4.4%	**27.5%**	**77.1%**
2009	2.4%	2.6%	**8.6%**	**5.7%**	**5.3%**	—	**5.4%**	**10.2%**	—	4.1%	4.8%	**26.3%**	**75.4%**
2010	—	2.7%	**10.1%**	**5.4%**	4.7%	2.7%	4.6%	**11.4%**	—	3.5%	4.4%	**25.7%**	**75.2%**
2011	—	2.7%	**11.9%**	**5.1%**	4.6%	2.5%	4.3%	**11.4%**	—	3.4%	4.5%	**25.2%**	**75.6%**
2012	—	2.8%	**12.5%**	4.8%	4.6%	2.7%	4.2%	**9.8%**	—	2.9%	4.4%	**25.6%**	**74.3%**
2013	—	2.7%	**13.8%**	4.8%	4.7%	2.6%	4.1%	**7.8%**	—	2.7%	4.5%	**26.8%**	**74.5%**
2014	2.2%	2.6%	**15.1%**	4.2%	4.3%	2.8%	3.9%	**7.1%**	—	—	4.7%	**28.6%**	**75.5%**
2015	2.2%	2.3%	**15.6%**	3.9%	4.0%	3.0%	3.5%	**7.2%**	—	—	4.7%	**29.5%**	**75.9%**
2016	2.2%	2.5%	**16.7%**	3.8%	3.9%	3.2%	3.3%	**7.2%**	—	—	4.0%	**29.9%**	**76.7%**
2017	2.2%	2.4%	**17.4%**	3.9%	4.1%	3.3%	3.3%	**6.7%**	—	—	4.1%	**28.4%**	**75.8%**
2018	—	2.2%	**18.4%**	3.8%	4.1%	3.4%	3.0%	**6.7%**	2.2%	—	3.7%	**28.5%**	**76.0%**
2019	—	2.3%	**18.1%**	3.6%	4.0%	3.4%	2.8%	**6.5%**	2.1%	—	3.6%	**29.6%**	**76.0%**
2020	—	2.5%	**17.5%**	3.9%	4.3%	3.0%	2.9%	**6.3%**	2.3%	—	3.7%	**29.9%**	**76.3%**
2021	2.3%	2.7%	**18.5%**	3.5%	4.0%	3.2%	2.5%	**5.4%**	—	—	3.6%	**31.3%**	**77.0%**
2022	—	2.5%	**18.6%**	3.5%	3.8%	3.4%	2.4%	**5.0%**	2.2%	—	3.5%	**30.8%**	**75.7%**
2023	%	%	%	%	%	%	%	%	%	%	%	%	%
2024	%	%	%	%	%	%	%	%	%	%	%	%	%
2025	%	%	%	%	%	%	%	%	%	%	%	%	%

== See also ==
- List of countries by financial assets
- List of countries by wealth per adult
- G7
- Distribution of wealth
- Affluence in the United States
