= List of countries by external debt =

This is a list of countries by external debt: it is the total public and private debt owed to non-residents repayable in internationally accepted currencies, goods or services, where the public debt is the money or credit owed by any level of government, from central to local, and the private debt the money or credit owed by private households or private corporations based on the country under consideration.

For information purposes, several non-sovereign entities are also included in this list. Note that while a country may have a relatively large external debt (either in absolute or per capita terms) it could actually be a "net international creditor" if its external debt is less than the total of external debt of other countries held by it.

== List of countries by External debt ==
Country	Total debt (billions)	Per capita, $	% of GDP	% of total wealth	Last Reported
United States	30,467.296	88,351	93.25	21.59	June 2026
United Kingdom	11,355	152,271	278.18	5.91	31 March 2026
France	9,547.3052	133,891	257.21	57.85	June 2026
Germany	8,313.9039	97,519	149.27	46.71	June 2026
Netherlands	4,877.3109	268,672	336.43	100.17	Mar 2026
Japan	4,786.71	38,939	109.30	21.2	Mar 2026
Luxembourg	4,055.4745	5.87 million	3,673	1356.35	Mar 2026
Ireland	3,899.2285	714,328	500.30	427.08	Mar 2026
Canada	3,555.8205	83,739	138.32	30.79	June 2026
Spain	3,290.5521	66,073	157.35	38.77	Mar 2026
Italy	3,268.9915	55,462	119.39	29.66	Mar 2026
Singapore	2,584.7364	423,020	391.88	135.61	Mar 2026
Switzerland	2,519.5166	275,668	219.68	52.17	Mar 2026
China	2,498.1668	1,717	11.57	2.86	June 2026
Hong Kong	2,121.2209	282,423	471.24	60.73	Mar 2026
Australia	2,239	73,934	96.51	21.09	June 2026
Belgium	1,841.2479	154,253	237.05	57.63	Mar 2026
Sweden	1,154.6942	108,850	151.84	49.45	Mar 2026
Austria	937.3072	101,650	150.28	52.25	Mar 2026
Mexico	880	6,784	43.64	18.10	Jul 2023
Norway	875.5962	155,419	146.08	53.26	Mar 2026
South Korea	774.3902	15,155	40.10	7.83	Mar 2026
India	762.7656	534.00	18.37	4.96	Mar 2026
Greece	693	66,798	225.28	77.85	December 2025
Brazil	705.268	3,246	26.28	14.97	Sept 2026
Denmark	688	114,040	136.49	36.79	December 2025
Finland	683.1452	120,849	202.31	86.26	Mar 2026
Turkey	565	6,562	34.44	54.26	September 2025
Poland	552.542	14,831	48.71	34.71	Mar 2026
Portugal	523	48,674	137.46	39.52	December 2025
Indonesia	444.4005	1,541	28.86	13.65	May 2026
Malaysia	355.7179	10,348	68.88	52.47	Mar 2026
Argentina	321.7828	6,925	46.75	76.61	Mar 2026
Hungary	313.632	33,054	115.68	68.48	Mar 2026
Russia	299.0637	2,048	11.26	6.82	Mar 2026
Chile	288.8523	14,334	70.82	37.08	Apr 2026
Czechia	275	25,233	63.67	35.77	December 2025
Saudi Arabia	264	8,183	23.87	11.64	2022
Cyprus	261.0716	265,587	577.96	239.52	Mar 2026
Romania	260	13,641	54.01	38.93	September 2025
New Zealand	257.6775	48,063	92.48	18.07	Mar 2026
Taiwan	237	10,163	24.21	4.36	September 2025
Ukraine	236.72	8,248	105.05	34.86	Mar 2026
Malta	227.8944	387,408	742.04	392.92	Mar 2026
United Arab Emirates	220	20,639	38.76	17.75	Dec 2016
Colombia	212	3,987	39.22	37.51	September 2025
Thailand	209.7429	3,192	36.16	14.76	Mar 2026
Mauritius	204.7499	164,874	1,196	3412.5	Jun 2026
South Africa	195.932	3,105	40.82	21.16	Mar 2026
Qatar	195	68,059	80.97	47.79	2018
Kazakhstan	182.7782	8,877	50.71	25.39	Mar 2026
Israel	175.1923	17,070	24.34	12.81	Mar 2026
Puerto Rico	167	51,634	142.15		31 Jan 2015
Egypt	164.776	1,517	38.35	13.19	Mar 2026
Slovakia	162	29,915	95.81	59.94	December 2025
Philippines	148	1,294	28.83	14.60	December 2025
Pakistan	137.5578	570.00	30.42	20.29	Mar 2026
Vietnam	130.8716	1,279	24.82	12.87	2025
Bangladesh	114	668.00	22.23	10.52	December 2025
Peru	112.4321	3,292	29.52	21.66	Mar 2026
Venezuela	110	3,878	100.18		Mar 2019
Kuwait	94.8379	19,429	54.84	16.82	Dec 2025
Lithuania	92.0	31,906	86.89	62.60	December 2025
Uzbekistan	89.8928	2,302	49.53		Mar 2026
Bulgaria	78.2539	12,183	52.83	30.33	Apr 2026
Slovenia	74.4	34,827	85.74	39.55	September 2025
Ecuador	66.4657	3,671	48.10	26.06	May 2026
Morocco	64.8	1,759	38.42	18.67	Dec 2022
Sudan	62.4	1,237	202.12	283.64	2021
Serbia	59.933	9,175	53.50	32.22	Mar 2026
Sri Lanka	54.5248	2,503	50.10	15.19	Mar 2026
Oman	54.0	10,244	48.54	28.59	2021
Croatia	52.9	13,694	55.04	22.98	Dec 2022
Latvia	52.2698	28,510	97.36	37.07	Mar 2026
Nigeria	51.9	232.00	15.37	7.42	December 2025
Uruguay	48.8	14,009	50.82	22.51	December 2025
Panama	48.7	11,976	51.23	32.45	December 2025
Estonia	48.3787	35,553	93.70	59	Mar 2026
Jordan	46.0207	3,855	70.90	19.58	Mar 2026
Tunisia	42.9465	3,587	70.70	24.26	Mar 2026
Kenya	42.3375	794.00	28.75	9.73	Dec 2025
Ivory Coast	40.561	1,248	36.18		2024
Mongolia	40.2175	11,199	141.36	268.12	Mar 2026
Bahrain	39.4	24,813	82.45	33.98	July 2023
Belarus	38.2956	4,229	37.53	15.02	Mar 2026
Angola	37.7	1,073	31.84	68.55	Dec 2016
Lebanon	34.6	6,301	158.82	10.03	Jun 2024
Iceland	29.8225	75,214	68.09	23.12	Dec 2025
Paraguay	29.7333	4,867	49.11	43.73	Dec 2025
Ghana	29.1198	847	24.62	26	Mar 2026
Georgia	27.1128	6,880	63.47	58.94	Mar 2026
Cuba	26.3	2,373	17.88		Dec 2016
Dominican Republic	26.1	2,418	19.22		Dec 2016
Ethiopia	25.4	232	10.66	8.48	25 Jan 2024
Costa Rica	24.9	4,691	24.74	11.81	Dec 2016
Zambia	23.3726	1,187	56.67	86.57	Dec 2025
Iraq	22.6	509	8.34		Dec 2023
Papua New Guinea	22.0	1,871	69.49	51.26	Dec 2016
Trinidad and Tobago	21.5	15,736	75.91	42.22	Dec 2016
Cambodia	19.3689	1,087	36.98	30.26	Mar 2026
Guatemala	19.1	1,070	15.78		Dec 2016
Bahamas	17.6	44,102	122.03	109.75	Dec 2013
Jamaica	16.8	5,931	83.39	37.24	Dec 2016
Monaco	16.5	430,057	187.84		30 June 2010
Bolivia	15.4	1,409	19.84	15.25	Mar 2026
El Salvador	14.9	2,471	41.56		Dec 2016
Tanzania	15.9	257	19.90	10.96	Dec 2016
North Macedonia	14.8639	8,171	68.80		Mar 2026
Kyrgyzstan	12.5266	1,692	53.07	50.11	Dec 2025
Moldova	12.0882	5,110	55.22	18.6	Mar 2026
Albania	11.9144	5,100	35.74	15.47	Mar 2026
Myanmar	11.1748	218.00	13.33	3.95	2024
Nicaragua	11.1	1,631	58.95	16.09	Dec 2016
Laos	10.9613	1,415	57.82	31.32	2025
Zimbabwe	10.9	651	30.35	15.35	Dec 2016
Nepal	10.5	361	24.09	11.69	Sep 2024
Mozambique	9.7212	278.00	41.77	60.76	2025
Montenegro	8.7413	14,033	85.47	24.28	2024
Honduras	8.040	813	21.89		Dec 2016
Cameroon	7.380	256	13.81	16.03	Dec 2016
Yemen	7.192	223	42.45		Jan 2015
Armenia	6.629	2,141	20.80	14.1	Jun 2026
Tajikistan	6.5919	615.00	32.28	26.37	Sep 202
Namibia	6.520	2,156	51.04	21.02	Dec 2016
Uganda	6.240	136	11.23	12.74	Dec 2016
Senegal	6.190	341	18.36	15.09	Dec 2016
Syria	5.920	240	31.83	32.88	Dec 2016
Kosovo	5.6177	3,543	39.98		Mar 2026
Bosnia and Herzegovina	5.5727	1,633	15.16	6.41	Mar 2026
Democratic Republic of the Congo	5.330	49	7.35	7.51	Dec 2016
Somalia	5.300	279	41.39		Dec 2013
Gabon	5.160	2,142	24.55	22.43	Dec 2016
North Korea	5.000	193	32.95		2013
Iran	4.8616	56	1.62	0.16	2025
Republic of the Congo	4.820	784	31.08	80.28	Dec 2016
Azerbaijan	4.8135	469	6.14	3.07	Dec 2025
Algeria	4.760	100	1.79	1.04	2023
Barbados	4.490	16,766	65.42	28.06	2010
Madagascar	4.010	130	24.34	13.36	Dec 2016
Mali	3.630	162	16.74	16.48	Dec 2016
Mauritania	3.590	728	33.73	59.75	Dec 2016
Libya	3.530	478	7.88	8.02	Dec 2016
Burkina Faso	3.090	132	14.12	19.32	Dec 2016
Malawi	2.813	95	17.09	8.73	2021
Niger	2.730	104	14.50	20.99	Dec 2016
Seychelles	2.550	21,029	115.84	63.80	Dec 2016
Rwanda	2.440	177	17.82	8.72	Dec 2016
Bermuda (UK)	2.440	38,014	31.11		2015
Benin	2.340	181	10.95	15.60	Dec 2016
Bhutan	2.260	2,909	72.70		Dec 2016
Haiti	2.020	163	8.41	40.44	Dec 2016
South Sudan	1.920	126	29.44		2017
Chad	1.880	100	10.03	18.75	Dec 2016
Cape Verde	1.660	3,379	61.07		Dec 2016
Sierra Leone	1.560	176	34.25	39.02	Dec 2016
Palestine	1.535	280	8.25	0.27	Dec 2018
Botswana	1.4988	635	6.83	5.55	2025
Equatorial Guinea	1.360	875	12.74	6.82	Dec 2016
Djibouti	1.340	1,255	30.68	66.95	Dec 2016
Guinea	1.330	93	5.23	7.40	Dec 2016
Belize	1.330	3,229	40.26	44.23	Dec 2016
Afghanistan	1.280	30	8.85	3.12	2011
Suriname	1.240	2,003	28.48	61.75	Dec 2016
Togo	1.170	145	11.93	19.55	Dec 2016
Guyana	1.140	1,479	5.40	19.05	Dec 2015
Andorra	1.110	12,736	28.53		2014
Liberia	1.110	212	23.37	7.94	Dec 2016
Guinea-Bissau	1.100	615	50.91	54.75	Dec 2010
Lesotho	0.949	411	39.62	47.44	Dec 2016
Faroe Islands (Denmark)	0.889	16,236	38.00		2010
Fiji	0.833	925	14.37	6.94	Dec 2016
Eritrea	0.820	232	34.42	16.40	Dec 2016
Maldives	0.742	1,440	10.30	7.42	2014
Burundi	0.705	55	23.07	17.63	Dec 2016
Aruba	0.693	6,444	17.04		Dec 2014
Central African Republic	0.687	106	24.44	34.34	Dec 2016
Grenada	0.679	6,031	48.29		2013
Gambia	0.542	224	20.11	18.06	Dec 2016
Saint Lucia	0.513	2,788	19.88		Dec 2016
Cayman Islands (UK)	0.503	6891	1.20		Sep 2024
Turkmenistan	0.503	71	0.60	0.64	Dec 2016
Solomon Islands	0.492	655	28.79		Dec 2013
Eswatini	0.471	381	9.25		Dec 2016
Samoa	0.447	2,176	43.67		Dec 2013
Antigua and Barbuda	0.441	4,259	20.74		Dec 2012
San Marino	0.352	10,339	17.31		2016
Brunei	0.340	754	2.12	2.83	2017
Saint Vincent and the Grenadines	0.321	2,897	28.47		Dec 2016
Timor-Leste	0.312	227	15.64	7.79	Dec 2014
Dominica	0.289	4,281	40.76		Dec 2016
Cook Islands	0.281	18,697	23.00		Dec 2011
Sao Tome and Principe	0.237	1,036	31.49		Dec 2016
Tonga	0.233	2,327	40.12		Dec 2016
Palau	0.224	12,596	95.00		Sep 2021
Vanuatu	0.208	647	16.14		Dec 2016
Saint Kitts and Nevis	0.188	3,654	16.53		Dec 2016
Comoros	0.133	153	9.37	6.66	Dec 2016
New Caledonia (France)	0.112	417	1.16		Dec 2013
Marshall Islands	0.098	2,309	32.12		2013
Micronesia	0.094	885	19.34		2013
Anguilla (UK)	0.048	3,288	15.83		Dec 2024
Greenland (Denmark)	0.036	644			2010
Nauru	0.033	2,851	20.68		2004
British Virgin Islands (UK)	0.018	560	2.00		Dec 2016
Tuvalu	0.015	1,386	22.42		2017
Kiribati	0.014	113	4.11		2013
Wallis and Futuna (France)	0.004	316	6.00		2004
Montserrat (UK)	0.001	237	2.00		Dec 2011
Niue (New Zealand)	0.000	0	0.00		27 Oct 2016

== World Bank ==
List of countries by external debt stocks (World Bank, 2023)
Country	External debt stocks (Nominal)		Present value of external debt		Present value to nominal ratio (%)
Country	Total (millions)	% of GNI	Total (millions)	% of GNI	Present value to nominal ratio (%)
China	2,420,211	13.7	488,114	2.8	20.2
India	646,787	18.4	212,728	6.1	32.9
Brazil	607,115	28.8	198,582	9.4	32.7
Mexico	595,918	34.2	306,307	17.6	51.4
Turkey	499,842	45.2	149,654	13.5	29.9
Indonesia	406,054	30.4	225,273	16.9	55.5
Argentina	266,167	42.1	74,362	11.8	27.9
Colombia	197,505	54.9	108,027	30.0	54.7
Thailand	193,626	38.5	37,065	7.4	19.1
Ukraine	176,645	96.1	90,003	49.0	51.0
Egypt	168,062	44.4	117,272	31.0	69.8
South Africa	165,787	44.1	93,879	25.0	56.6
Kazakhstan	163,155	69.0	25,765	10.9	15.8
Vietnam	141,850	34.8	34,426	8.5	24.3
Pakistan	130,847	39.4	89,148	26.8	68.1
Philippines	121,402	25.0	63,241	13.0	52.1
Nigeria	102,482	29.0	45,009	12.8	43.9
Bangladesh	101,447	22.3	58,020	12.8	57.2
Peru	90,068	35.5	38,102	15.0	42.3
Morocco	69,267	48.7	42,262	29.7	61.0
Mozambique	66,848	349.7	8,274	43.3	12.4
Lebanon	66,296	332.8	41,936	—	63.3
Sri Lanka	61,706	75.6	42,198	51.7	68.4
Ecuador	60,564	52.1	39,658	34.1	65.5
Uzbekistan	59,184	58.7	25,714	25.5	43.4
Angola	57,032	74.3	45,299	59.0	79.4
Dominican Republic	52,257	45.0	35,044	30.2	67.1
Serbia	49,000	63.5	21,726	28.2	44.3
Jordan	44,630	88.4	21,058	41.7	47.2
Ghana	43,742	58.0	29,241	38.8	66.8
Kenya	42,910	40.4	31,451	29.6	73.3
Tunisia	41,279	87.4	21,212	44.9	51.4
Senegal	39,950	134.0	14,985	50.3	37.5
Costa Rica	39,025	48.5	15,574	19.4	39.9
Belarus	36,705	52.9	18,010	26.0	49.1
Cote d'Ivoire	36,548	48.3	26,576	35.1	72.7
Tanzania	34,598	44.6	17,513	22.6	50.6
Mongolia	34,321	189.7	8,379	46.3	24.4
Ethiopia	33,290	20.4	25,426	15.6	76.4
Zambia	29,029	110.5	16,597	63.2	57.2
Paraguay	26,135	62.8	13,783	33.1	52.7
Guatemala	25,365	24.7	11,862	11.6	46.8
Georgia	24,468	86.2	9,085	32.0	37.1
El Salvador	22,742	71.3	12,668	39.7	55.7
Sudan	22,581	20.9	21,650	20.0	95.9
Cambodia	22,534	54.5	8,019	19.4	35.6
Laos	20,350	138.6	9,619	65.5	47.3
Iraq	20,331	8.1	15,580	6.2	76.6
Uganda	19,393	40.6	10,469	21.9	54.0
Mauritius	19,252	128.3	3,632	24.2	18.9
Bolivia	16,307	37.2	11,174	25.5	68.5
Armenia	15,839	67.6	6,002	25.6	37.9
Jamaica	15,349	80.2	9,636	50.4	62.8
Cameroon	15,332	31.7	11,112	23.0	72.5
Papua New Guinea	15,321	53.2	7,011	24.3	45.8
Nicaragua	15,163	89.5	6,753	39.9	44.5
Azerbaijan	14,533	21.0	12,378	17.9	85.2
Zimbabwe	14,213	40.8	6,671	19.2	46.9
Bosnia and Herzegovina	14,010	51.2	5,359	19.6	38.3
Honduras	12,821	40.2	7,785	24.4	60.7
North Macedonia	12,614	84.3	5,637	37.7	44.7
Benin	12,483	64.1	6,309	32.4	50.5
Myanmar	12,162	18.6	8,748	13.4	71.9
Rwanda	11,384	82.4	5,531	40.0	48.6
Albania	11,364	48.9	5,363	23.1	47.2
DR Congo	11,067	17.2	7,926	12.3	71.6
Moldova	10,639	63.3	2,637	15.7	24.8
Burkina Faso	10,397	53.4	3,565	18.3	34.3
Kyrgyzstan	10,115	73.3	3,617	26.2	35.8
Nepal	9,969	24.1	5,719	13.8	57.4
Iran	9,901	2.4	6,759	1.7	68.3
Montenegro	8,617	113.3	3,643	47.9	42.3
Congo	7,779	53.5	6,360	43.7	81.8
Gabon	7,588	41.2	6,442	35.0	84.9
Algeria	7,315	3.0	4,764	2.0	65.1
Yemen	7,283	—	6,492	—	89.1
Tajikistan	6,873	45.4	3,024	20.0	44.0
Mali	6,457	32.8	4,085	20.7	63.3
Madagascar	6,452	41.8	3,548	23.0	55.0
Niger	5,613	34.7	3,793	23.4	67.6
Guinea	5,164	25.5	3,764	18.6	72.9
Syria	4,876	21.3	4,573	—	93.8
Mauritania	4,604	43.2	3,072	28.8	66.7
Kosovo	4,242	39.7	786	7.4	18.5
Suriname	4,048	129.1	2,645	84.4	65.3
Maldives	4,000	68.7	3,113	53.5	77.8
Turkmenistan	3,918	6.5	3,696	6.1	94.3
Malawi	3,604	29.2	2,269	18.4	63.0
Djibouti	3,429	85.6	2,531	63.2	73.8
Afghanistan	3,428	19.8	2,717	15.7	79.3
Togo	3,375	36.6	1,923	20.9	57.0
Fiji	3,348	65.3	1,397	27.2	41.7
Bhutan	3,269	115.0	2,827	—	86.5
Chad	3,214	24.8	2,286	17.6	71.1
Somalia	3,023	27.7	2,563	23.5	84.8
Guyana	2,953	28.3	1,805	17.3	61.1
Haiti	2,638	13.3	1,865	9.4	70.7
Cape Verde	2,451	97.9	1,385	55.3	56.5
Sierra Leone	2,382	37.5	1,451	22.8	60.9
Botswana	2,079	10.7	1,761	9.1	84.7
Liberia	2,078	52.4	1,335	33.7	64.2
Lesotho	1,776	68.9	928	36.0	52.3
Belize	1,510	51.1	1,235	41.8	81.8
Gambia	1,325	56.0	902	38.2	68.1
Eswatini	1,241	30.0	923	22.3	74.4
Guinea-Bissau	1,128	55.2	897	43.8	79.5
Saint Lucia	1,086	49.0	901	40.7	83.0
Burundi	1,043	39.4	805	30.4	77.2
Central African Republic	1,021	37.7	724	26.8	70.9
Grenada	727	58.9	501	40.6	68.9
Eritrea	726	—	461	—	63.5
St. Vincent and the Grenadines	629	59.4	457	43.2	72.7
Dominica	598	91.2	301	45.9	50.3
Solomon Islands	528	31.8	184	11.1	34.8
Vanuatu	471	36.7	300	23.4	63.7
Sao Tome and Principe	454	66.2	327	47.7	72.0
Samoa	432	46.8	270	29.2	62.5
Comoros	382	28.2	268	19.7	70.2
East Timor	307	12.6	238	9.8	77.5
Tonga	196	38.6	159	—	81.1

== See also ==
- Balance of trade
- Domestic liability dollarization
- List of countries by corporate debt
- List of countries by household debt
- List of countries by government debt
- List of countries by financial assets
- National debt of the United States
- Global debt
