= List of countries by corporate debt =

The following list sorts countries by nonfinancial corporate debt as percentage of GDP according to data by the International Monetary Fund.

== 2000–2023 ==
* indicates "Economy of COUNTRY or TERRITORY" links.

Countries by nonfinancial corporate debt, loans and debt securities as % of GDP (2000–2023)
| Country | 2023 | 2022 | 2021 | 2020 | 2015 | 2010 | 2005 | 2000 |
|---|---|---|---|---|---|---|---|---|
| Afghanistan * | | | | 2.02 | 3.12 | 9.96 | | |
| Albania * | 21.37 | 23.36 | 26.68 | 28.57 | 33.26 | 30.03 | 12.67 | |
| Argentina * | 30.87 | 17.85 | 18.35 | 24.37 | 15.09 | 16.24 | 26.11 | 21.89 |
| Australia * | 60.13 | 59.83 | 63.26 | 69.18 | 76.13 | 66.81 | 67.79 | 68.71 |
| Austria * | 90.16 | 92.69 | 101.20 | 99.46 | 91.55 | 93.06 | 82.05 | 82.55 |
| Bangladesh * | 30.23 | 31.31 | 31.44 | 31.61 | 29.41 | 25.90 | 17.27 | |
| Belgium * | 130.24 | 134.72 | 143.42 | 156.73 | 148.80 | 136.46 | 113.56 | 105.41 |
| Brazil * | 51.25 | 52.06 | 52.35 | 54.24 | 53.87 | 36.82 | 32.99 | 33.36 |
| Bulgaria * | | 59.39 | 68.84 | 76.66 | 95.10 | 116.36 | 65.84 | 25.11 |
| Cameroon * | | | | | 10.58 | 7.46 | 6.54 | |
| Canada * | 118.19 | 115.67 | 126.42 | 132.81 | 108.59 | 85.12 | 77.42 | 82.60 |
| Central African Republic * | | 10.14 | 8.38 | 7.92 | 6.85 | 5.32 | 4.29 | |
| Chad * | | | 5.51 | 4.63 | 4.30 | 2.17 | 1.25 | |
| Chile * | 94.97 | 97.16 | 101.75 | 109.59 | 104.26 | 70.14 | 64.12 | |
| China * | 141.41 | 136.21 | 130.72 | 137.08 | 140.87 | 110.86 | | |
| Colombia * | 30.83 | 32.32 | 34.14 | 37.55 | 41.10 | 30.17 | 26.70 | 37.42 |
| Congo * | 9.81 | 9.99 | 11.62 | 11.91 | 11.94 | 4.68 | 1.54 | |
| Costa Rica * | | 31.56 | 33.56 | 35.57 | 33.90 | 27.83 | 27.75 | |
| Croatia * | 72.56 | 76.72 | 82.21 | 92.11 | 97.14 | 99.78 | 61.14 | 44.12 |
| Cyprus * | | 142.56 | 163.38 | 179.92 | 220.91 | 195.64 | 158.89 | 227.23 |
| Czech Republic * | | 48.86 | 51.55 | 55.74 | 55.73 | 54.92 | 43.65 | 54.42 |
| Denmark * | 128.81 | 132.83 | 126.07 | 125.67 | 126.47 | 115.97 | 97.20 | 75.48 |
| El Salvador * | | 29.59 | 29.14 | 31.92 | 22.30 | 19.71 | 29.04 | |
| Estonia * | | 73.30 | 75.56 | 81.56 | 85.63 | 95.64 | 78.57 | 64.19 |
| Finland * | 116.66 | 122.70 | 122.16 | 123.09 | 126.81 | 108.27 | 87.62 | 90.18 |
| France * | 149.47 | 156.30 | 161.69 | 172.28 | 136.28 | 118.67 | 107.68 | 104.03 |
| Germany * | 68.82 | 71.51 | 72.56 | 73.00 | 62.84 | 68.56 | 67.18 | 68.74 |
| Greece * | 55.04 | 56.29 | 67.18 | 66.56 | 66.63 | 67.66 | 46.20 | 39.41 |
| Honduras * | 36.91 | 35.44 | 33.99 | 35.65 | 25.23 | 22.12 | 20.39 | |
| Hong Kong * | 270.17 | 277.69 | 275.67 | 292.43 | 230.41 | 165.33 | 118.80 | 104.97 |
| Hungary * | 74.87 | 83.81 | 80.63 | 71.07 | 73.52 | 86.06 | 64.26 | 53.87 |
| Iceland * | | 125.89 | 145.03 | 139.40 | 202.45 | 405.77 | 224.53 | 112.92 |
| India * | 59.26 | 56.48 | 54.55 | 61.18 | 61.96 | 67.86 | 71.11 | 54.89 |
| Indonesia * | | 22.21 | 23.22 | 25.02 | 25.06 | 14.07 | 16.24 | |
| Ireland * | 136.74 | 142.73 | 156.41 | 177.32 | 257.68 | 197.68 | 95.62 | |
| Israel * | 68.51 | 69.03 | 70.62 | 69.49 | 68.67 | 82.18 | 84.45 | 71.14 |
| Italy * | 63.10 | 67.65 | 72.45 | 77.31 | 77.07 | 82.16 | 66.17 | 56.73 |
| Japan * | 114.65 | 117.68 | 115.97 | 115.76 | 94.32 | 101.54 | 100.43 | 117.78 |
| Jordan * | 39.00 | 41.80 | 40.80 | 42.60 | | | | |
| Kazakhstan * | | 18.02 | 24.50 | 29.17 | 38.96 | 43.20 | 31.76 | |
| South Korea * | 113.87 | 112.61 | 106.93 | 103.56 | 93.11 | 91.60 | 70.56 | 85.83 |
| Latvia * | | 42.81 | 47.57 | 55.02 | 61.58 | 91.20 | 58.47 | 42.05 |
| Lesotho * | 6.55 | 5.74 | 5.75 | 5.89 | 6.93 | 6.25 | 3.41 | |
| Lithuania * | | 40.11 | 39.50 | 38.53 | 37.64 | 48.83 | 38.13 | 29.88 |
| Luxembourg * | 316.07 | 317.76 | 346.93 | 339.02 | 328.68 | 275.33 | 161.98 | 90.79 |
| Malaysia * | 89.75 | 87.59 | 101.74 | 105.39 | 95.95 | 89.60 | | |
| Malta * | | 126.17 | 149.25 | 174.97 | 149.14 | 161.03 | 115.24 | 111.40 |
| Mauritius * | | 44.48 | 51.51 | 62.10 | 59.24 | 50.22 | | |
| Mexico * | 20.88 | 22.75 | 24.32 | 26.08 | 23.67 | 15.87 | 12.50 | 16.60 |
| Morocco * | | 40.35 | 37.79 | 41.10 | 37.19 | 40.08 | 26.80 | |
| Myanmar * | | | | 26.92 | 17.39 | 4.87 | 4.56 | |
| Nepal * | 57.58 | 60.20 | 66.11 | 55.33 | 30.01 | 24.99 | 15.31 | |
| Netherlands * | 113.95 | 126.64 | 136.54 | 144.28 | 170.12 | 143.15 | 126.88 | 130.10 |
| New Zealand * | 69.71 | 71.05 | 72.50 | 77.01 | 85.56 | 96.62 | 90.32 | 85.32 |
| Nicaragua * | 11.96 | 12.02 | 11.27 | 12.10 | 13.83 | 9.53 | 8.37 | |
| North Macedonia * | 69.07 | 69.77 | 68.12 | 67.34 | 65.90 | 58.34 | 26.82 | |
| Norway * | 142.74 | 126.47 | 142.56 | 163.72 | 153.06 | 142.97 | 112.66 | 103.86 |
| Pakistan * | | 19.49 | 20.59 | 20.70 | 12.57 | 16.71 | | |
| Paraguay * | | 47.37 | 46.84 | 47.12 | | | | |
| Peru * | | 43.49 | 46.85 | 53.14 | 34.09 | 19.63 | 14.64 | |
| Poland * | 36.98 | 40.60 | 43.51 | 45.93 | 47.90 | 38.62 | 28.31 | 32.47 |
| Portugal * | 82.89 | 92.62 | 103.04 | 107.52 | 119.65 | 127.13 | 101.05 | 83.93 |
| Romania * | | 13.18 | 13.18 | 13.57 | 14.73 | 23.11 | 12.91 | |
| Russia * | 76.25 | 72.04 | 77.35 | 92.09 | 87.81 | 52.83 | 38.83 | 23.11 |
| Western Samoa * | 22.18 | 27.96 | 28.88 | 28.68 | 24.82 | 20.65 | 18.94 | 16.15 |
| São Tomé and Príncipe * | 1.65 | 3.84 | 6.65 | 8.01 | 13.13 | 12.88 | | |
| Saudi Arabia * | | 35.20 | 40.93 | 44.23 | 34.30 | 26.16 | 12.97 | 13.72 |
| Singapore * | 129.56 | 123.07 | 148.89 | 171.11 | 139.79 | 95.61 | 95.66 | 105.48 |
| Slovakia * | 46.44 | 52.13 | 52.56 | 54.59 | 50.53 | 43.10 | 36.80 | 43.10 |
| Slovenia * | 41.12 | 45.60 | 46.01 | 47.69 | 67.83 | 94.69 | 65.17 | 43.95 |
| Solomon Islands * | 11.39 | 11.97 | 12.65 | 14.16 | 12.64 | 12.17 | 8.70 | |
| South Africa * | 31.32 | 32.97 | 31.87 | 36.68 | 38.13 | 32.60 | | |
| Spain * | 79.73 | 90.33 | 102.17 | 106.66 | 108.89 | 139.07 | 102.80 | 72.52 |
| Sri Lanka * | | | | | 33.35 | 2.34 | | |
| Suriname * | | 39.05 | 45.29 | 54.89 | 45.73 | 15.97 | 11.62 | |
| Sweden * | 127.71 | 152.36 | 150.37 | 145.30 | 129.65 | 113.40 | 106.51 | 107.08 |
| Switzerland * | 138.13 | 144.15 | 149.15 | 141.83 | 111.72 | 106.92 | 86.51 | 90.47 |
| Tajikistan * | 3.55 | 3.21 | 3.32 | 4.23 | 11.10 | 7.84 | 4.85 | |
| Thailand * | 91.23 | 91.70 | 94.22 | 91.34 | 83.13 | 74.52 | 94.58 | |
| Turkey * | 47.97 | 54.80 | 74.35 | 71.42 | 61.49 | 39.72 | | |
| Ukraine * | 41.35 | 50.43 | 39.94 | 50.94 | 98.75 | 78.27 | 39.40 | 15.88 |
| United Arab Emirates * | | 69.10 | 83.59 | 100.41 | 76.62 | 74.82 | | |
| United Kingdom * | 62.85 | 65.99 | 75.91 | 83.78 | 69.64 | 82.10 | 78.22 | 70.74 |
| United States * | 77.21 | 80.65 | 82.76 | 86.33 | 73.68 | 68.96 | 64.84 | 65.90 |
| Vanuatu * | | 25.55 | 26.51 | 26.17 | 33.34 | 32.91 | 26.73 | |

== 1960–2000 ==
* indicates "Economy of COUNTRY or TERRITORY" links.

Countries by nonfinancial corporate debt, loans and debt securities as % of GDP (1960–2000)
| Country | 2000 | 1995 | 1990 | 1985 | 1980 | 1975 | 1970 | 1965 | 1960 |
|---|---|---|---|---|---|---|---|---|---|
| Argentina * | 21.89 | 20.90 | | | | | | | |
| Australia * | 68.71 | 60.01 | 75.91 | 52.60 | 39.29 | | | | |
| Austria * | 82.55 | 65.17 | | | | | | | |
| Belgium * | 105.41 | 68.56 | 57.21 | 51.84 | 55.20 | | | | |
| Brazil * | 33.36 | 38.84 | | | | | | | |
| Bulgaria * | 25.11 | 30.57 | | | | | | | |
| Canada * | 82.60 | 81.94 | 79.18 | 67.34 | 69.81 | 57.61 | 52.01 | | |
| Colombia * | 37.42 | | | | | | | | |
| Croatia * | 44.12 | 30.33 | | | | | | | |
| Cyprus * | 227.23 | 254.78 | | | | | | | |
| Czech Republic * | 54.42 | 59.54 | | | | | | | |
| Denmark * | 75.48 | 65.43 | | | | | | | |
| Estonia * | 64.19 | 32.43 | | | | | | | |
| Finland * | 90.18 | 83.86 | 86.49 | 67.22 | 61.61 | 62.37 | 72.80 | | |
| France * | 104.03 | 97.83 | 92.70 | 79.48 | 78.60 | | | | |
| Germany * | 68.74 | 55.11 | 59.40 | 61.21 | 60.43 | 59.37 | 53.46 | | |
| Greece * | 39.41 | 29.68 | | | | | | | |
| Hong Kong * | 104.97 | 116.27 | 131.83 | | | | | | |
| Hungary * | 53.87 | 38.33 | 46.85 | 51.20 | 50.93 | 39.57 | 31.95 | | |
| Iceland * | 112.92 | 71.20 | 69.64 | 81.69 | 66.86 | 56.48 | 55.57 | | |
| India * | 54.89 | | | | | | | | |
| Israel * | 71.14 | 55.13 | | | | | | | |
| Italy * | 56.73 | 52.55 | 41.97 | 42.72 | 43.17 | 61.15 | 61.33 | 54.13 | 43.83 |
| Japan * | 117.78 | 142.35 | 139.18 | 109.91 | 94.27 | 100.51 | 91.85 | 95.44 | |
| South Korea * | 85.83 | 87.37 | 73.01 | 76.33 | 58.63 | 39.95 | 42.52 | 21.20 | |
| Latvia * | 42.05 | 10.74 | | | | | | | |
| Lithuania * | 29.88 | 19.82 | | | | | | | |
| Luxembourg * | 90.79 | 73.83 | | | | | | | |
| Malta * | 111.40 | 109.88 | | | | | | | |
| Mexico * | 16.60 | 35.77 | | | | | | | |
| Netherlands * | 130.10 | 116.71 | 111.46 | | | | | | |
| New Zealand * | 85.32 | 78.27 | 70.88 | | | | | | |
| Norway * | 103.86 | 86.75 | 100.53 | 89.22 | 81.56 | 78.61 | | | |
| Poland * | 32.47 | 19.89 | | | | | | | |
| Portugal * | 83.93 | 65.03 | 61.30 | 105.87 | 101.76 | | | | |
| Russia * | 23.11 | | | | | | | | |
| Western Samoa * | 16.15 | 7.95 | | | | | | | |
| Saudi Arabia * | 13.72 | | | | | | | | |
| Singapore * | 105.48 | 105.46 | 62.81 | | | | | | |
| Slovakia * | 43.10 | 62.83 | | | | | | | |
| Slovenia * | 43.95 | 28.49 | | | | | | | |
| Spain * | 72.52 | 48.68 | 45.10 | 51.67 | 53.11 | | | | |
| Sweden * | 107.08 | 88.63 | 99.33 | 59.08 | 53.46 | 61.87 | 74.36 | 72.24 | |
| Switzerland * | 90.47 | | | | | | | | |
| Ukraine * | 15.88 | 7.60 | | | | | | | |
| United Kingdom * | 70.74 | 53.87 | 57.07 | 34.88 | 26.60 | 27.40 | 27.33 | | |
| United States * | 65.90 | 56.63 | 63.92 | 59.42 | 51.72 | 51.83 | 48.29 | 41.21 | 37.16 |

== See also ==
- List of countries by external debt
- List of countries by household debt
- List of countries by government debt
- Global debt
