= List of countries by household debt =

The following lists sort countries by stock of loans and debt issued by households as a percentage of GDP according to data by the International Monetary Fund and Institute of International Finance.

== International Monetary Fund ==
=== 2000–2023 ===
Countries by household debt, loans and debt securities as % of GDP (2000–2023)
Country	2023	2022	2021	2020	2015	2010	2005	2000
Afghanistan				0.54	0.58	1.43		
Albania	12.31	12.15	12.52	12.60	11.28	11.88	5.04	
Argentina	4.04	4.07	4.53	5.57	6.35	4.83	3.14	6.60
Australia	109.81	110.62	117.36	122.17	120.93	111.11	101.34	70.18
Austria	44.35	48.23	51.53	52.48	50.14	54.36	51.72	45.28
Bangladesh	6.69	6.87	6.82	6.83	6.91	7.60	6.96	
Belgium	58.55	60.34	62.57	65.78	58.40	52.99	43.30	40.79
Brazil	34.90	33.99	32.52	32.20	27.96	22.11	13.49	13.89
Bulgaria		22.47	23.84	24.29	23.24	28.64	15.93	2.38
Cameroon					3.48	3.21	1.80	
Canada	102.21	101.55	106.43	112.18	100.71	94.86	72.26	61.34
Central African Republic		2.20	2.79	3.18	4.44	2.89	2.21	
Chad			3.20	2.66	1.92	0.96	0.59	
Chile	46.34	46.28	44.92	48.27	41.26	32.58	26.33	
China	63.67	62.32	62.09	61.61	39.06	27.56		
Colombia	27.15	28.47	30.07	32.38	26.87	18.70	12.95	9.71
Republic of the Congo	4.61	4.33	3.60	3.49	3.28	1.18	0.66	
Costa Rica	26.56	27.14	28.87	31.33	28.22	22.77	18.13	
Croatia	29.87	30.56	33.75	37.45	37.61	41.17	30.47	12.76
Cyprus		71.73	79.90	88.61	126.43	118.04	90.63	77.74
Czech Republic		32.61	34.38	33.93	30.17	28.77	16.45	7.72
Denmark	88.36	84.46	101.42	111.72	119.58	133.70	110.31	84.75
El Salvador	27.76	27.97	28.98	32.42	28.90	27.25	24.27	
Estonia		36.79	38.36	40.56	39.72	52.93	31.99	8.66
Finland	64.10	65.97	68.49	69.53	63.67	58.90	46.34	31.62
France	62.63	65.83	66.41	68.19	56.01	53.71	41.84	34.35
Germany	51.33	53.88	55.55	56.28	52.60	58.22	66.85	70.48
Greece	41.79	45.29	55.73	59.80	62.85	62.00	40.20	14.65
Honduras	36.93	32.93	31.51	33.33	28.92	24.35	17.14	
Hong Kong	93.22	96.36	93.14	91.61	67.09	59.23	54.93	57.90
Hungary	16.83	18.69	21.06	20.83	21.15	39.40	23.47	6.47
Iceland		76.83	82.88	84.47	79.80	101.77	96.12	86.51
India	39.16	37.32	36.05	40.43	32.43	35.20	8.03	2.59
Indonesia	16.46	16.24	17.25	17.80	16.80	13.61	11.48	
Ireland	27.43	25.09	28.96	34.50	53.82	112.27	81.05	
Israel	42.09	43.73	43.50	42.95	40.18	38.51	36.57	35.51
Italy	37.83	40.59	42.46	44.89	41.83	43.46	32.92	22.68
Japan	65.66	67.85	67.65	67.49	59.52	61.23	62.09	69.84
Jordan	36.90	38.70	37.40	35.10				
Kazakhstan	15.16	13.66	12.86	10.80	10.72	10.26	9.02	
South Korea	93.54	97.26	98.67	97.08	79.16	70.15	61.13	47.55
Latvia		17.88	19.49	20.44	24.41	47.73	27.39	5.39
Lesotho	16.49	15.67	16.03	15.46	10.97	6.53	3.40	
Lithuania		21.77	23.41	24.16	22.30	29.65	13.77	1.63
Luxembourg	69.22	67.71	67.46	69.74	59.76	55.61	46.00	38.76
Malaysia	69.41	66.66	72.90	76.31	69.74	58.75		
Malta		54.95	58.36	60.96	50.74	57.42	44.47	23.43
Mauritius		31.40	34.87	38.21	31.20	29.90		
Mexico	16.27	16.02	16.04	16.73	14.69	12.67	10.48	7.33
Morocco	26.45	28.56	28.74	30.55	27.05	24.91	18.00	
Myanmar				0.97	1.57	0.52	0.39	
Nepal	33.79	33.89	37.16	32.78	26.58	22.49	9.42	
Netherlands	84.92	90.12	97.62	102.39	110.93	119.10	108.75	89.63
New Zealand	91.61	94.30	97.80	97.27	89.61	90.25	82.58	61.87
Nicaragua	14.71	14.10	14.27	15.64	20.32	14.74	14.18	
North Macedonia	28.89	29.37	30.14	30.16	22.43	18.08	8.15	
Norway	86.47	75.01	95.03	113.04	95.17	81.49	68.66	52.45
Pakistan	2.23	2.78	2.89	3.21	2.80	3.95		
Paraguay	6.93	6.82	6.67	6.47				
Peru	16.98	16.91	15.56	18.07	14.97	10.60	6.30	
Poland	23.64	26.43	32.23	34.62	36.06	34.43	15.00	7.14
Portugal	55.20	60.90	66.34	69.10	77.05	90.87	79.82	58.82
Romania	10.83	12.24	13.82	14.05	15.15	18.90	8.71	
Russia	22.19	20.07	21.00	21.90	15.96	10.26	5.72	0.58
Samoa	21.95	25.09	24.86	20.30	17.39	17.24	16.09	12.75
São Tomé and Príncipe	4.75	6.73	8.51	9.28	15.72	23.99		
Saudi Arabia	32.68	29.42	32.77	32.64	29.66	22.51	29.72	18.10
Singapore	46.44	45.53	53.36	60.72	64.66	52.26	48.70	41.74
Slovakia	44.02	47.09	47.03	46.53	34.30	24.35	12.26	4.25
Slovenia	24.27	25.91	26.34	27.74	27.61	30.26	18.83	15.76
Solomon Islands	8.59	8.46	8.56	6.51	6.49	4.86	2.81	
South Africa	33.92	34.23	34.06	36.56	37.69	39.61		
Spain	45.74	51.22	57.00	62.02	67.43	84.03	70.70	45.41
Sri Lanka					9.99	21.64		
Suriname	3.95	4.85	4.80	6.10	11.01	9.35	5.20	
Sweden	83.43	87.54	91.86	93.65	82.44	75.92	60.61	47.21
Switzerland	126.45	126.26	130.30	134.96	122.34	107.67	109.17	100.81
Tajikistan	8.17	6.57	6.07	5.83	9.40	4.21	1.53	
Thailand	86.88	87.01	90.04	89.58	81.16	59.27	45.08	
Turkey	10.91	10.79	14.43	17.41	17.73	15.96		
Ukraine	3.65	4.27	4.68	4.90	8.80	19.42	8.10	0.63
United Arab Emirates	22.14	20.30	22.80	25.67	24.32	27.16		
United Kingdom	77.76	82.46	87.94	92.91	88.13	94.95	87.43	65.27
United States	72.93	75.47	77.75	78.46	77.26	91.73	92.73	70.85
Vanuatu	30.68	30.21	33.37	32.97	38.06	34.32	16.25	

=== 1960–2000 ===
Countries by household debt, loans and debt securities as % of GDP (1960–2000)
Country	2000	1995	1990	1985	1980	1975	1970	1965	1960
Argentina	6.60	3.86							
Australia	70.18	54.14	45.07	42.58	38.02				
Austria	45.28	41.30							
Belgium	40.79	37.81	35.97	29.05	32.89				
Brazil	13.89	12.63							
Bulgaria	2.38	0.39							
Canada	61.34	59.94	55.63	40.48	47.61	41.71	34.57		
Colombia	9.71								
Croatia	12.76	4.02							
Cyprus	77.74	62.87							
Czech Republic	7.72	10.08							
Denmark	84.75	73.38							
Estonia	8.66	1.80							
Finland	31.62	34.70	42.36	32.14	25.93	20.56	18.10		
France	34.35	33.53	32.17	26.79	22.56				
Germany	70.48	59.89	57.73	60.55	51.92	43.94	39.50		
Greece	14.65	6.26							
Hong Kong	57.90	41.21	34.49						
Hungary	6.47	6.62	18.57	20.55	15.37	10.83	7.30	8.03	
Iceland	86.51	68.99	45.03	33.17	16.67	16.12	22.02		
India	2.59								
Israel	35.51	32.85							
Italy	22.68	17.42	16.81	6.25	6.18	8.53	7.26	6.01	3.56
Japan	69.84	70.13	68.34	52.09	45.62	35.82	25.92	21.40	
South Korea	47.55	44.32	38.81	26.58	16.31	12.64	10.65	1.94	
Latvia	5.39	1.35							
Lithuania	1.63	1.58							
Luxembourg	38.76	38.92							
Malta	23.43	17.20							
Mexico	7.33	11.14							
Netherlands	89.63	63.15	51.44						
New Zealand	61.87	45.63	27.85						
Norway	52.45	55.35	70.25	53.71	42.82	41.11			
Poland	7.14	2.25							
Portugal	58.82	28.39	15.23	12.16	10.04				
Russia	0.58								
Samoa	12.75	7.82							
Saudi Arabia	18.10								
Singapore	41.74	35.57							
Slovakia	4.25	3.63							
Slovenia	15.76	12.84							
Spain	45.41	31.19	30.77	23.34	24.31				
Sweden	47.21	43.60	55.56	47.62	47.79	44.77	39.13	39.99	39.67
Switzerland	100.81								
Ukraine	0.63	0.24							
United Kingdom	65.27	58.12	57.61	42.46	30.21	30.56	30.48		
United States	70.85	64.84	61.15	53.69	49.70	44.65	43.89	46.92	40.72

== Institute of International Finance ==
IIF Household debt (% of GDP)
Country	Q3 2019	Q3 2018
South Korea	95.1	91.2
United Kingdom	83.8	83.6
Hong Kong	77.3	71.0
United States	74.2	74.8
Thailand	68.4	68.3
Malaysia	67.8	68.0
China	55.4	51.9
Japan	55.3	55.6
Lebanon	54.5	52.3
Singapore	52.6	54.5
Chile	47.2	44.5
Israel	41.6	41.8
Poland	35.0	35.2
South Africa	34.2	33.2
Czech Republic	31.9	32.0
Brazil	28.7	27.1
Colombia	27.0	27.3
United Arab Emirates	22.3	22.7
Russia	18.3	16.8
Hungary	18.1	18.1
Indonesia	16.9	17.0
Mexico	16.7	16.1
Philippines	16.3	16.2
Nigeria	15.6	15.5
Turkey	14.1	16.0
Saudi Arabia	11.6	12.0
Ghana	11.5	11.2
Egypt	7.3	7.0
Kenya	7.2	7.9
Argentina	6.2	7.1
Ukraine	5.9	5.7
Pakistan	2.7	2.8
Ghana	2.5	2.8

== See also ==
- List of countries by corporate debt
- List of countries by external debt
- List of countries by government debt
- Global debt
