= List of countries by government debt =

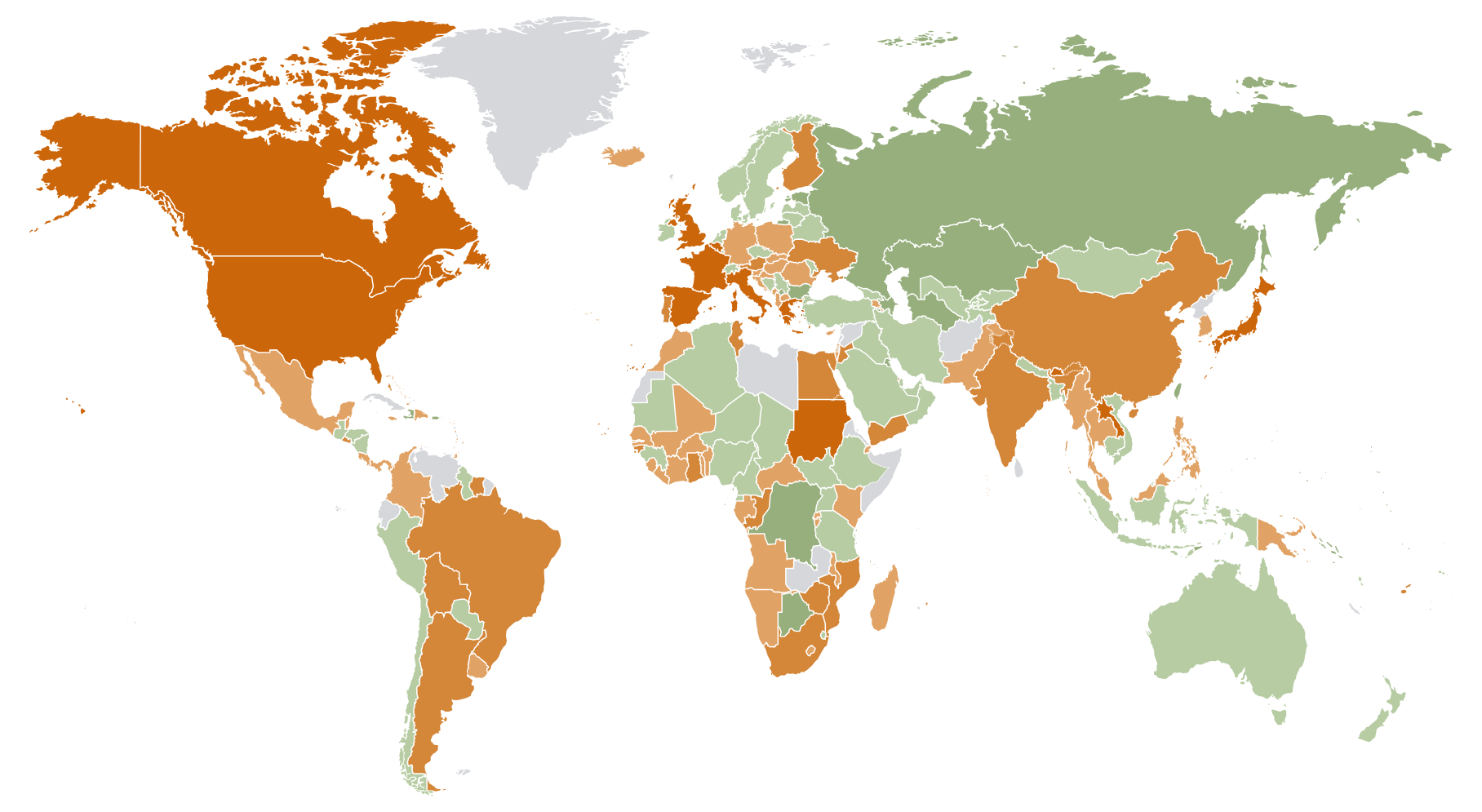
100% or more, 75%–100%, 50%–75%, 25%–50%, less than 25%, no data. Total (gross) government debt as a percent of GDP by IMF in 2024.

General government debt in OECD (% of GDP)

This article contains a list of countries by government debt. Gross government debt is government financial liabilities that are debt instruments. A debt instrument is a financial claim that requires payment of interest and/or principal by the debtor to the creditor in the future. Examples include debt securities (such as bonds and bills), loans, and government employee pension obligations. Net debt equals gross debt minus financial assets that are debt instruments. Net debt estimates are not always available since some government assets are difficult to value, such as loans made at concessional rates.

Changes in government debt over time reflect primarily borrowing due to past government deficits. A deficit occurs when a government's expenditures exceed revenues.

In the list below, government debt is measured for the general government sector because the level of government responsible for programs (for example, health care) differs across countries, and the general government comprises central, state, provincial, regional, and local governments, and social security funds.

To make the numbers comparable across countries of different sizes, government debt is represented as a percentage of a country's gross domestic product (GDP), a measure called the debt-to-GDP ratio. For context on the magnitude of the debt numbers, European Union member countries have an agreement, the Stability and Growth Pact (SGP), to maintain a general government gross debt of no more than 60% of GDP. The aim of the SGP is to prevent excessive debt burdens.

== Government debt as a percentage of GDP ==
When data is not available, numbers are International Monetary Fund staff estimates.

General government debt-to-GDP ratios (as %; 2025)
Country or region	Gross debt	Net debt
Afghanistan	8.0	
Albania	52.6	45.5
Algeria	54.1	47.2
Andorra	30.3	
Angola	51.3	
Antigua and Barbuda	69.7	
Argentina	80.3	
Armenia	49.0	
Aruba	63.6	
Australia	51.0	32.4
Austria	80.5	62.9
Azerbaijan	20.1	
Bahamas	73.8	
Bahrain	147.6	
Bangladesh	42.0	
Barbados	94.2	93.5
Belarus	33.1	
Belgium	106.3	93.3
Belize	67.9	
Benin	57.3	
Bhutan	103.6	
Bolivia	84.8	76.1
Bosnia and Herzegovina	29.9	20.4
Botswana	38.6	37.2
Brazil	93.3	65.2
Brunei	1.5	
Bulgaria	27.1	19.5
Burkina Faso	52.0	
Burundi	41.2	
Cape Verde	101.0	89.7
Cambodia	26.5	
Cameroon	40.4	38.7
Canada	113.5	10.2
Central African Republic	61.8	
Chad	30.4	
Chile	41.8	27.9
China	99.2	
Colombia	59.9	52.0
Comoros	29.5	
Democratic Republic of the Congo	20.2	
Republic of the Congo	96.8	
Costa Rica	60.4	58.5
Croatia	55.9	44.9
Cyprus	55.3	24.9
Czech Republic	44.6	30.2
Denmark	27.5	-6.0
Djibouti	32.1	32.1
Dominica	102.6	
Dominican Republic	59.0	47.3
Ecuador	54.4	
Egypt	86.8	82.2
El Salvador	87.2	
Equatorial Guinea	40.6	26.1
Eritrea		
Estonia	24.2	10.1
Eswatini	44.9	40.6
Ethiopia	43.1	40.7
Fiji	78.7	72.2
Finland	89.3	41.8
France	116.0	108.8
Gabon	78.9	
Gambia	73.9	
Georgia	34.3	
Germany	62.9	47.2
Ghana	48.8	
Greece	145.7	
Grenada	71.6	
Guatemala	27.2	
Guinea	48.1	
Guinea-Bissau	75.3	
Guyana	28.6	26.8
Haiti	12.3	
Honduras	41.2	
Hong Kong	11.9	
Hungary	75.2	60.3
Iceland	56.1	45.8
India	84.1	
Indonesia	41.0	38.7
Iran	37.3	33.5
Iraq	53.9	
Ireland	32.9	26.3
Israel	68.5	67.0
Italy	137.1	127.7
Ivory Coast	56.3	
Jamaica	67.7	
Japan	206.5	136.5
Jordan	82.8	
Kazakhstan	24.6	6.5
Kenya	69.3	66.3
Kiribati	8.0	
Kosovo	17.5	
Kuwait	14.6	
Kyrgyzstan	36.0	
Laos	80.6	
Latvia	46.9	37.7
Lebanon	139.4	131.4
Lesotho	49.1	7.3
Liberia	54.9	54.9
Libya		
Liechtenstein	0.5	
Lithuania	39.8	37.1
Luxembourg	27.0	-4.0
Macau		
Madagascar	48.7	
Malawi	78.4	
Malaysia	70.7	
Maldives	125.4	
Mali	41.9	38.3
Malta	46.8	37.5
Marshall Islands	11.8	
Mauritania	40.1	37.5
Mauritius	86.5	
Mexico	61.8	53.2
Micronesia	8.9	
Moldova	36.6	
Mongolia	45.1	
Montenegro	67.1	
Morocco	67.1	66.5
Mozambique	102.5	
Myanmar	51.9	
Namibia	70.2	70.1
Nauru	14.7	
Nepal	48.1	
Netherlands	43.3	35.7
New Zealand	54.7	25.8
Nicaragua	34.8	
Niger	45.4	43.9
Nigeria	35.5	35.3
North Macedonia	52.5	51.4
Norway	45.0	-160.2
Oman	35.8	1.1
Pakistan	72.8	66.5
Palau	62.3	
Panama	56.6	40.4
Papua New Guinea	52.1	
Paraguay	38.1	35.7
Peru	30.2	22.9
Philippines	59.4	
Poland	58.8	47.5
Portugal	89.9	85.6
Puerto Rico	18.0	
Qatar	41.4	
Romania	60.6	50.0
Russia	17.2	
Rwanda	64.6	
Saint Kitts and Nevis	58.4	51.2
Saint Lucia	77.1	
Saint Vincent and the Grenadines	113.4	
Samoa	21.2	
San Marino	60.6	
São Tomé and Príncipe	55.7	
Saudi Arabia	31.7	22.5
Senegal	130.2	
Serbia	42.4	37.5
Seychelles	51.5	44.7
Sierra Leone	45.2	
Singapore	171.3	
Slovakia	61.6	55.8
Slovenia	65.9	50.0
Solomon Islands	28.7	
Somalia		
South Africa	78.6	75.9
South Korea	52.3	9.3
South Sudan	62.1	62.1
Spain	100.4	85.0
Sri Lanka		
Sudan	187.6	
Suriname	105.8	
Sweden	34.9	12.2
Switzerland	39.4	19.2
Syria		
Taiwan	22.4	20.5
Tajikistan	21.6	
Tanzania	49.7	
Thailand	64.7	
Timor-Leste	14.3	
Togo	63.0	
Tonga	27.4	
Trinidad and Tobago	84.2	58.9
Tunisia	81.3	
Turkey	23.5	18.9
Turkmenistan	3.8	
Tuvalu	3.6	
Uganda	54.2	
Ukraine	108.7	
United Arab Emirates	34.3	
United Kingdom	102.3	93.8
United States	123.9	96.7
Uruguay	65.7	56.7
Uzbekistan	28.6	
Vanuatu	40.9	
Venezuela	308.7	
Vietnam	30.3	
Palestinian territories		
Yemen		
Zambia	86.0	81.0
Zimbabwe	43.8	

== Public debt per capita ==
Public debt per capita (2017)
Country	(PPP)	(Forex)	Other year
Japan *	$102,503	$91,768	
Singapore *	$97,852	$60,016	
Qatar *	$77,278	$37,990	
Greece *	$50,562	$33,905	
Italy *	$49,060	$41,056	
Ireland *	$47,822	$44,871	
Belgium *	$47,291	$44,119	
United States *	$46,645	$46,645	
Canada *	$44,348	$41,323	
Bahrain *	$43,659	$21,673	
France *	$41,040	$37,189	
Austria *	$39,419	$37,310	
United Kingdom *	$39,311	$35,320	
Portugal *	$38,127	$26,462	
Bermuda *	$37,015	$37,015	2016
Spain *	$35,466	$26,210	
Germany *	$33,349	$29,394	
Aruba *	$30,674	$19,918	2016
Netherlands *	$30,452	$27,415	
Barbados *	$28,001	$26,777	
Finland *	$27,111	$27,986	
Switzerland *	$26,367	$34,225	
Norway *	$25,900	$27,095	
Cyprus *	$25,047	$17,103	
Slovenia *	$24,939	$17,110	
Luxembourg *	$23,582	$23,742	
Israel *	$22,922	$25,351	
Malta *	$21,746	$14,204	
Antigua and Barbuda *	$21,709	$13,796	
Australia *	$21,695	$23,990	
Hungary *	$21,693	$10,427	
Lebanon *	$21,238	$13,039	
Iceland *	$21,169	$28,505	
Sweden *	$21,048	$21,763	
Kuwait *	$20,462	$8,525	
Puerto Rico *	$20,360	$16,320	
Bahamas *	$19,796	$19,960	
Oman *	$19,326	$7,196	
U.S. Virgin Islands *	$19,292	$25,819	
Croatia *	$18,601	$9,976	
Seychelles *	$18,482	$10,068	
Saint Kitts and Nevis *	$18,363	$11,420	
Taiwan *	$18,027	$8,682	
Denmark *	$17,487	$19,784	
Slovakia *	$16,798	$8,970	
Andorra *	$15,915	$12,973	2016
Malaysia *	$15,873	$5,313	
South Korea *	$15,633	$11,830	
Uruguay *	$15,241	$11,540	
Poland *	$14,829	$6,912	
Equatorial Guinea *	$14,783	$5,858	
Trinidad and Tobago *	$14,735	$7,834	
San Marino *	$14,726	$11,722	
United Arab Emirates *	$14,133	$7,769	
Faroe Islands *	$13,728	$18,969	2015
Mauritius *	$13,262	$6,253	
New Zealand *	$13,180	$14,045	
Brazil *	$13,064	$8,265	
Lithuania *	$13,000	$6,717	
Egypt *	$12,474	$2,450	
Czech Republic *	$12,206	$7,007	
Montenegro *	$12,122	$5,234	
Argentina *	$11,884	$8,217	
Mongolia *	$11,701	$3,281	
Maldives *	$11,236	$7,335	
Saint Lucia *	$10,859	$7,202	
Gabon *	$10,847	$4,418	
Mexico *	$10,618	$4,962	
Panama *	$10,353	$6,150	
Grenada *	$10,252	$7,021	
Nauru *	$10,235	$7,293	
Latvia *	$10,194	$5,724	
Suriname *	$10,069	$3,963	
Belarus *	$10,055	$3,051	
Bhutan *	$9,993	$3,336	
Sri Lanka *	$9,663	$3,060	
Iraq *	$9,644	$2,858	
Jamaica *	$9,360	$5,305	
Serbia *	$9,333	$3,658	
Azerbaijan *	$9,273	$2,190	
Saudi Arabia *	$9,226	$3,569	
Saint Vincent and the Grenadines *	$9,167	$5,688	
Dominica *	$8,747	$6,223	
Albania *	$8,457	$3,070	
Tunisia *	$8,406	$2,439	
Cape Verde *	$8,360	$3,931	
Romania *	$8,291	$3,634	
Belize *	$8,257	$4,757	
Costa Rica *	$8,230	$5,713	
Jordan *	$8,161	$3,680	
China *	$7,878	$4,077	
Iran *	$7,802	$2,049	
Guam *	$7,631	$7,631	
Turkey *	$7,613	$2,966	
Congo *	$7,594	$2,253	
Thailand *	$7,548	$2,781	
South Africa *	$7,342	$3,343	
Colombia *	$7,298	$3,225	
Curaçao *	$6,912	$12,375	2014
Dominican Republic *	$6,249	$2,748	
Ukraine *	$5,970	$1,811	
Chile *	$5,952	$3,647	
Cuba *	$5,879	$4,024	
North Macedonia *	$5,755	$2,109	
Morocco *	$5,665	$2,074	
El Salvador *	$5,615	$2,723	
Turkmenistan *	$5,519	$2,019	
Greenland *	$5,437	$5,005	2016
Ecuador *	$5,311	$2,870	
Kazakhstan *	$5,311	$1,769	
Gibraltar *	$5,203	$5,203	2014
India *	$5,202	$1,429	
Bulgaria *	$5,198	$1,928	
Sudan *	$5,003	$1,292	
Armenia *	$4,990	$2,032	
Venezuela *	$4,684	$2,579	
Bosnia and Herzegovina *	$4,600	$1,864	
Fiji *	$4,555	$2,582	
Guyana *	$4,441	$2,510	
Russia *	$4,380	$1,721	
Mauritania *	$4,347	$1,241	
Laos *	$4,338	$1,492	
Namibia *	$4,337	$2,159	
Algeria *	$4,159	$1,106	
Angola *	$4,145	$2,709	
Vietnam *	$3,911	$1,329	
Georgia *	$3,632	$1,382	
Bolivia *	$3,628	$1,637	
Indonesia *	$3,562	$1,112	
Peru *	$3,488	$1,737	
Ghana *	$3,424	$1,201	
Pakistan *	$3,420	$983	
Philippines *	$3,305	$1,182	
Eswatini *	$3,030	$1,154	
Estonia *	$3,013	$1,878	
São Tomé and Príncipe *	$2,966	$1,699	
Palau *	$2,957	$3,271	
Samoa *	$2,773	$2,051	
Tonga *	$2,666	$2,053	
Zambia *	$2,645	$986	
Paraguay *	$2,468	$1,081	
Syria *	$2,450	$1,199	2016
Botswana *	$2,428	$1,082	
Gambia *	$2,336	$623	
Kyrgyzstan *	$2,216	$724	
Kosovo *	$2,178	$788	
Moldova *	$2,173	$876	
Brunei *	$2,105	$754	
Eritrea *	$2,066	$1,277	
Guatemala *	$2,057	$1,126	
Anguilla *	$2,024	$2,024	2013
Zimbabwe *	$2,010	$1,035	
Burma *	$1,992	$406	
Nicaragua *	$1,992	$756	
Honduras *	$1,992	$988	
Yemen *	$1,913	$813	
West Bank	$1,850	$857	2015
Kenya *	$1,833	$887	
Uzbekistan *	$1,805	$395	
Senegal *	$1,762	$679	
Ivory Coast *	$1,739	$724	
Northern Mariana Islands *	$1,696	$1,696	
Tajikistan *	$1,665	$418	
Papua New Guinea *	$1,585	$1,041	
American Samoa *	$1,579	$1,579	
Bangladesh *	$1,433	$543	
Tuvalu *	$1,394	$1,328	
Somalia *	$1,392	$480	
Mozambique *	$1,391	$472	
Djibouti *	$1,309	$730	
Vanuatu *	$1,297	$1,462	
Cameroon *	$1,289	$504	
South Sudan *	$1,229	$188	
Benin *	$1,222	$445	
Nigeria *	$1,201	$403	
Togo *	$1,201	$441	
Cambodia *	$1,187	$408	
Sierra Leone *	$1,169	$366	
Lesotho *	$1,143	$472	
Tanzania *	$1,084	$345	
Ethiopia *	$1,003	$404	
Chad *	$949	$327	
Guinea-Bissau *	$932	$397	
Guinea *	$894	$328	
Uganda *	$873	$261	
Federated States of Micronesia *	$823	$775	
Rwanda *	$820	$304	
Mali *	$792	$295	
Nepal *	$703	$221	
Burkina Faso *	$692	$243	
Malawi *	$669	$186	
Marshall Islands *	$660	$748	
Haiti *	$576	$248	
Madagascar *	$559	$161	
Kiribati *	$546	$474	
Comoros *	$520	$257	
Niger *	$498	$188	
Liberia *	$437	$235	
Libya *	$431	$213	
Burundi *	$349	$148	
Central African Republic *	$312	$178	
Timor-Leste *	$213	$80	
Solomon Islands *	$189	$185	
DR Congo *	$146	$88	
Afghanistan *	$139	$41	
Hong Kong *	$63	$47	
Falkland Islands *	$0	$0	2015
Macau *	$0	$0	

== Other unfunded mandates ==
Governmental unfunded mandates include state-guaranteed pay-as-you-go pension plans.

Unfunded mandates (2021)
Country	Unfunded mandates (% of GDP)
Austria	451
Belgium	316
Bulgaria	197
Croatia	320
Cyprus	297
Czech Republic	261
Denmark	24
Estonia	315
Finland	330
France	398
Germany	326
Greece	409
Hungary	334
Iceland	98
Ireland	149
Italy	434
Latvia	229
Lithuania	280
Luxembourg	355
Malta	244
Netherlands	215
Norway	264
Poland	296
Portugal	373
Romania	378
Slovakia	232
Slovenia	387
Spain	501
Sweden	191
Switzerland	232

== See also ==
- Debt Sustainability Analysis
- List of countries by government budget
- List of countries by past gross government debt
- List of countries by tax revenue
- List of countries by credit rating
- List of countries by corporate debt
- List of countries by household debt
- List of countries by external debt
- List of sovereign debt crises
- Consumer price index by country
- Global debt
- Government bond
- Fiscal sustainability

=== Nation specific ===
- National debt of the United States
- National debt of Japan
- United Kingdom national debt
- Canadian public debt
- National Debt of South Africa
