= Debt Service Suspension Initiative =

Debt Service Suspension Initiative (DSSI) was adopted in May 2020. To tackle the COVID-19 health and economic crisis, development banks suspended debt service payments from the poorest countries that asked this suspension. Thus 73 low- and lower-middle-income countries could devote to COVID-19 expenses the money they should have paid for their debts with these banks: US$4.6 billion. DSSI was further complemented by additional financing provided by the World Bank, the International Monetary Fund and other development banks. DSSI expired at the end of December 2021.

== Beneficiary countries ==
The countries which suspended their debt service under DSSI were Afghanistan, Angola, Burkina Faso, Burundi Cabo Verde, Cameroon, Central African Republic, Chad, Comoros, Democratic Republic of Congo, Republic of Congo, Côte d'Ivoire, Djibouti, Dominica, Ethiopia, Fiji, The Gambia, Grenada, Guinea, Guinea-Bissau, Kenya Kyrgyz Republic, Lesotho, Liberia, Madagascar, Malawi, Maldives, Mali, Mauritania, Mozambique, Myanmar Nepal, Niger, Pakistan, Papua New Guinea, Samoa, São Tomé and Príncipe, Senegal, Sierra Leone, St. Lucia, St. Vincent and the Grenadines, Tajikistan, Tanzania, Togo, Tonga, Uganda, Yemen and Zambia.

== Requirements ==
Each beneficiary country will be required:

- to use the created fiscal space to increase social, health or economic spending in

response to the crisis;

- to disclose all public sector financial commitments, respecting commercially

sensitive information; and

- to contract no new non-concessional debt during the suspension period.

== Common Framework ==
After DSSI (a provisional scheme) expired, the G20 established a permanent mechanism to help low-income countries dealing with huge debt: the Common Framework. But only four countries have asked to restructure their debt under this mechanism: Chad, Ethiopia, Zambia and Ghana.

== See also ==
- Debt relief
- Debt service ratio
- Debt service coverage ratio
- Developing countries' debt
- External debt
- Government debt (public debt)
- Heavily indebted poor countries (HIPC)
- Millennium Development Goals
- Multilateral Debt Relief Initiative (MDRI)
- Odious debt
