= Debt Justice =

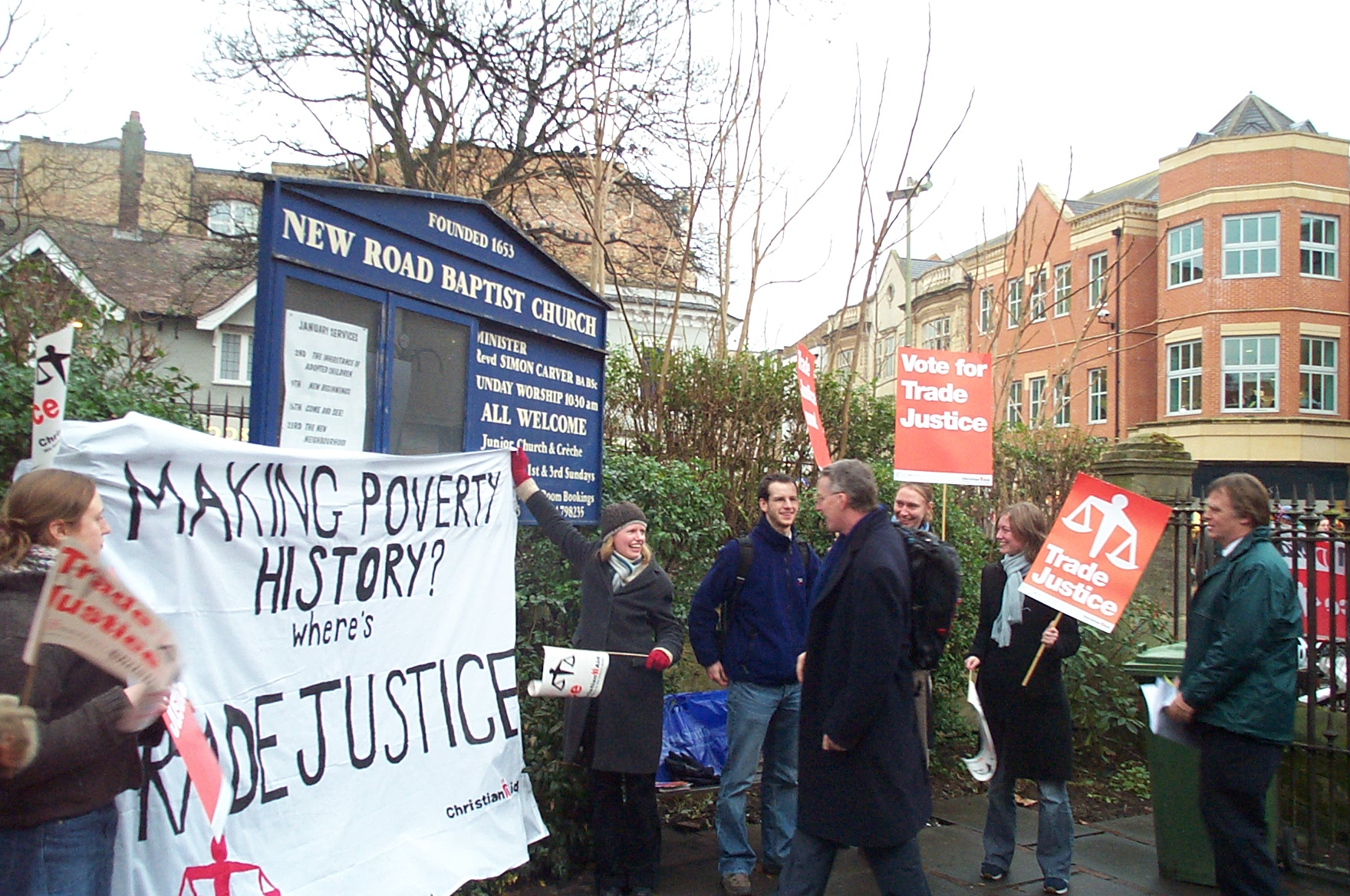

Debt Justice (formerly Jubilee Debt Campaign, Jubilee Debt Coalition and Drop The Debt) is a UK-based campaigning organisation which seeks to end injustice in relation to developing countries' debt and hence, it claims, the poverty and inequality that debt perpetuates. The organisation’s activities include campaigning, advocacy, community organising and activism and aims to build collective power with people most affected by debt to demand a fair economy for all.

== History ==
The Coalition was formed as a successor organisation to the Jubilee 2000 Coalition. Many campaigners felt that it was necessary to continue working together to monitor the G8's promise to deliver $100 billion of debt relief at Cologne in 1999, and make further progress on the cancellation of the poorest countries' debts.

The name was chosen in 1995/1996, as preparations were gathering pace for the celebration of the millennium. The concept was that justice and poverty alleviation through the cancellation of debts would be a fitting celebration for the millennium. The concept of debt cancellation and celebration is linked to the Old Testament concept of Jubilee, which meant that every 50 years, people sold into slavery, or land sold due to bankruptcy, were redeemed.

== Campaigns ==
Debt Justice campaigns on unjust debt owed by lower income countries to wealthy governments, multilateral institutions like the IMF and World Bank, banks, oil traders and hedge funds. The campaign aims for governments to have the fiscal space to tackle poverty and inequality, demanding comprehensive cancellation of debt for countries where debt is preventing basic needs and human rights being met; lending and borrowing to be responsible and accountable to citizens of the country undertaking the borrowing; and rich countries to give sufficient climate finance to allow lower income countries to mitigate and adapt to climate change, and to compensate countries for loss and damage which cannot be adapted to, as grants.

The global Jubilee campaign won $130 billion of debt cancellation for lower income countries between 2000 and 2015. The campaign called for the debts of 52 countries to be cancelled by the year 2000. This did not happen, but 36 countries did eventually get an average of three-quarters of their debt cancelled, enabling significant improvements to public services such as healthcare and education.

The organisation campaigned successfully for UK legislation to protect 40 lower income countries from profiteering by so-called vulture funds. In April 2010 an Act of Parliament, the Debt Relief (Developing Countries) Act, was passed, restricting the ability of vulture funds to sue the poorest countries in UK courts. The meant that no creditor, including vulture funds, could sue a country in the UK for more than they would have got if they had taken part in the debt cancellation initiative. Many debt contracts are governed by UK law, so the Act had a significant impact in forcing more lenders to participate in debt cancellation and set an important principle that legal action could be taken to make private lenders take part in debt relief.

In 2020, the organisation campaigned for a debt jubilee to tackle the Covid-19 health and economic crisis. Over 200 networks and organisations signed a statement calling for cancellation of debt payments in response to the pandemic. The campaign contributed to the cancellation of $1 billion of debt by the IMF, and suspension of $13 billion of debt payments by governments under the Debt Service Suspension Initiative. However, private lenders were excluded from the suspension, meaning that less than a quarter of debt payments were suspended across the 46 countries.

In 2021-22 the organisation campaigned for debt cancellation by banks and speculators which continued to demand debt repayments from some of the poorest countries across Africa, Asia, Latin America and the Caribbean. The campaign focused on Zambia’s renegotiation of its debts to BlackRock and other lenders. The organisation published research indicating that Zambia’s creditors would have to take losses of about two-thirds if the country is to meet the International Monetary Fund’s requirements for a debt restructuring.

Since 2017, the organisation has been campaigning on unpayable UK household debt. In 2021, it published a joint paper with the Centre for Responsible Credit.

== Location ==
The organisation's office is in Bethnal Green, London.

== See also ==
- Jubilee 2000
- Jubilee USA Network
- Odious debt
