= DATA =

Multinational non-governmental organization

Debt, AIDS, Trade, Africa (DATA) was a multinational non-governmental organization founded in January 2002 in London by U2's lead vocalist, Bono, with Bobby Shriver and activists from the Jubilee 2000 Drop the Debt campaign.

DATA was created for the purposes of obtaining equality and justice for Africa through debt relief, adjusting trade rules which burden Africa, eliminating the epidemic of AIDS in Africa, strengthening democracy, furthering accountability by the wealthiest nations and African leaders and transparency towards the people. In 2007, in the United States, DATA and Bono were jointly awarded the National Constitution Center's 2007 Liberty Medal for their groundbreaking efforts to address the AIDS crisis and extreme poverty in Africa.

Start-up funds came from the Bill & Melinda Gates Foundation, the financier George Soros and the technology entrepreneur Edward W. Scott.

In October 2007, it was announced that DATA and the One Campaign would merge in the United States under the single organization "One". The change occurred in January 2008.

DATA received support from the Christian rock / alternative rock bands Switchfoot and Third Day.
