= Drop the Debt =

Late 1990s campaign for international debt cancellation

Drop the Debt is the slogan of the late 1990s campaign for international debt cancellation led by the organisation Jubilee 2000.

The phrase was coined by filmmaker Mike Christie. He and Jubilee 2000's Jamie Drummond set out to create a mainstream campaign to engage major figures within entertainment and music industries including Bono of rock band U2, and in turn the wider public. The slogan Drop The Debt garnered global recognition, and due to its success, is often assumed to be name of Jubilee 2000. Among the supporters were Quincy Jones, Willie Colón, Muhammad Ali, Bob Geldof, Youssou N'dour, Thom Yorke, N.T. Wright, and others.

The slogan was subsequently used as the name for the short-lived British NGO formed after the dissolution of Jubilee 2000. Drop the Debt existed to work in the run-up to the G8 Summit in Genoa, Italy, and ensure that debt relief was on the agenda at that meeting. Founding staff included Jamie Drummond and Lucy Matthew who went on to form DATA with the support of Bono, Bobby Shriver and other high-profile figures.

Jamie Drummond and Bono subsequently co-founded One.org.
