= Assisted person =

An assisted person has several meanings in law, referring generally to indigent people.

Under Great Britain statutory law, one who is eligible for Legal aid. It also refers to such a person under Scottish law.

Under U.S. Bankruptcy law, it is also a person who applies to a debt relief agency. A debt relief agency is "any person who provides any bankruptcy assistance to an assisted person in return for the payment of money or other valuable consideration, or who is a bankruptcy petition preparer" under 11 U.S.C. § 110. "The term 'assisted person' means any person whose debts consist primarily of consumer debts and the value of whose nonexempt property is less than $150,000." 11 U.S.C. § 101(3). Debt relief agencies are subject to certain rules regarding information they must provide to an assisted person.
