= Jubilee Scotland =

UK charity

- Logo of Jubilee Scotland
- Type: Charity
- Headquarters: Edinburgh, Scotland, UK
- Location: Scotland
- Region served: Developing countries
- Website: www.jubileescotland.org.uk

Jubilee Scotland is a coalition of organisations across Scotland that describes its goal as "campaigning to end global debt slavery". Membership of the coalition is broad, and includes faith groups, unions, cooperatives, campaigning groups and local councils.

The charity aims to take action against debts owed by countries in the Global South to individuals, organisations and countries in the Global North where these debts are considered to be odious. In doing so it continues the work of the Jubilee 2000 coalition, which similarly called for the cancellation of unjust and unpayable debts. The organisation has strong links with the Jubilee Debt Coalition, which undertakes similar work in England and Wales.

== Campaigns ==
Jubilee Scotland currently has three major campaign strands:

- Break the Chains, which calls on the Scottish Government to pledge to cancel unjust debts and commit to an ethical export credit agency;
- Defuse the Debt Crisis, which calls for the Scottish Government to promote Scotland as a centre of arbitration for international debt disputes; and
- End Britain's Dodgy Deals, which joins the Jubilee Debt Coalition in pressuring the Export Credits Guarantee Department to impose stronger ethical standards when deciding which projects to underwrite.
