= Bono =

Irish musician and activist (born 1960)

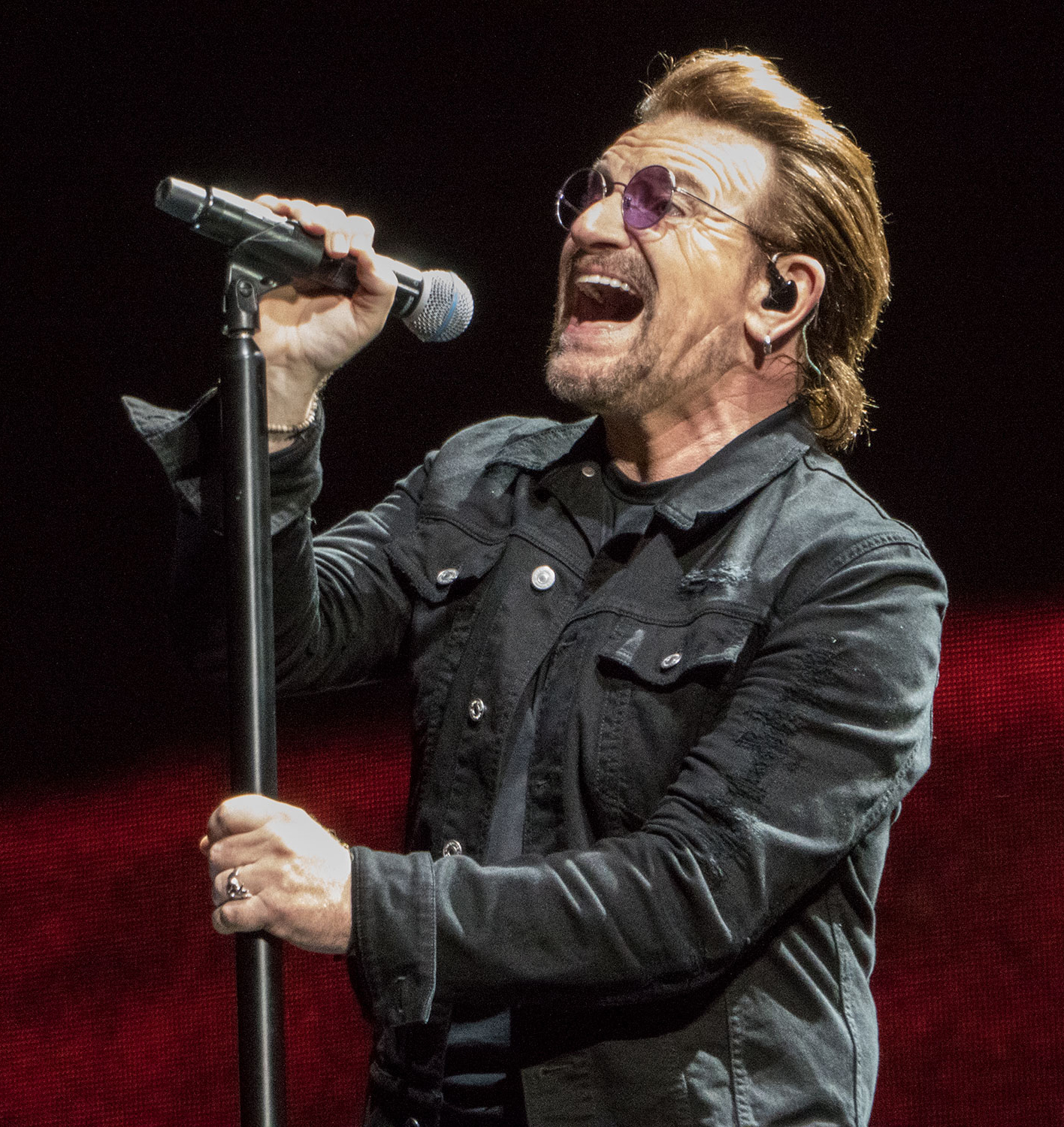
- Bono performing in 2017
- Born: Paul David Hewson; 10 May 1960 (age 66); Dublin, Ireland
- Other name: Bono Vox
- Occupations: Singer-songwriter; musician; activist; businessman
- Organization: One Campaign
- Spouse: Ali Stewart (m. 1982)
- Children: 4, including Eve and Elijah Hewson
- Awards: Full list
- Musical career
- Origin: Dublin, Ireland
- Genres: Rock; alternative rock; pop rock; post-punk
- Instruments: Vocals; guitar; harmonica
- Years active: 1976–present
- Labels: Island; Interscope; Mercury; CBS Ireland
- Member of: U2

Paul David Hewson (born 10 May 1960), known by the nickname Bono (/ˈbɒnoʊ/ BON-oh), is an Irish singer-songwriter and activist. He is a founding member, the lead vocalist, and primary lyricist of the rock band U2. Bono is known for his impassioned vocal style as well as his grandiose songwriting and performance style. His lyrics frequently include social and political themes, and religious imagery inspired by his Christian faith.

Born and raised in Dublin, Ireland, he attended Mount Temple Comprehensive School where in 1976 he began dating his future wife, Alison Stewart, as well as forming, with schoolmates, the band that became U2. During U2's early years, Bono's lyrics contributed to the group's rebellious and spiritual tone. As the band matured, his lyrics became inspired more by personal experiences shared with the other members. As a member of U2, Bono has received 22 Grammy Awards and has been inducted into the Rock and Roll Hall of Fame.

Aside from his music, Bono is an activist for social justice causes, both through U2 and as an individual. He is particularly active in campaigning to fight extreme poverty and HIV/AIDS in Africa, for which he co-founded DATA, EDUN, the ONE Campaign, and Product Red. In pursuit of these causes, he has participated in benefit concerts and lobbied politicians and heads of state for relief. Bono has received numerous honours for his philanthropic efforts, including being named one of the Time Persons of the Year in 2005, being granted an honorary knighthood by Elizabeth II of the United Kingdom in 2007, being made a Commandeur of the French Ordre des Arts et des Lettres (Order of Arts and Letters) in 2013, and receiving the Presidential Medal of Freedom in the United States in 2025. Bono has also attracted criticism for bypassing African businesses in his activist efforts and for tax avoidance in his personal finances.

Outside the band, he has recorded with numerous artists. He has collaborated with U2 bandmate the Edge on several projects, including: songs for Roy Orbison, Tina Turner, and Martin Garrix; and the soundtracks to the musical Spider-Man: Turn Off the Dark and a London stage adaptation of A Clockwork Orange. In business, he invested in the refurbishment of the Clarence Hotel in Dublin, and was managing director and a managing partner of the private equity firm Elevation Partners, which invested in several companies.

== Early life ==
Paul David Hewson was born in the Rotunda Hospital in Dublin on 10 May 1960, the second child of Iris (née Rankin) and Brendan Robert "Bob" Hewson, then living in Stillorgan on Dublin's Southside. His brother, Norman, is eight years older than he is. Bono's family moved to a new house on Cedarwood Road, between the Northside suburbs of Finglas and Ballymun when he was six weeks old, and he grew up there. (Note: Bono stated "when we moved to Cedarwood Road everyone was saying we lived in Ballymun ... I asked my dad, who worked in the postal service, and he said, believe it or not, one part of the road is Ballymun and one part of the road is Finglas, so you can say what you like".)

The Hewson brothers grew up in an interdenominational Christian household; their mother was a member of the Church of Ireland, and their father was a Roman Catholic. Both parents initially agreed that the first child would be raised Anglican and the second Catholic. Although Bono was the second child, he also attended Church of Ireland services with his mother and brother, while his father also sometimes brought him to Mass at the nearby Catholic church, St Canice's. In 2000, Bono learned that Scott Rankin, a relative he thought to be his cousin, was actually his half-brother; Rankin was the offspring of an affair that Bob Hewson had with his wife's sister Barbara.

Bono attended a Protestant primary school, Glasnevin National School, rather than the local Catholic-managed primary school in Ballymun. His teenage musical idols were Bob Dylan, Leonard Cohen, David Bowie, and Marc Bolan of T. Rex. After attending St. Patrick's Cathedral Grammar School for a year, Bono moved to Mount Temple Comprehensive School, a multi-denominational school in Clontarf.

Bono's mother died on 10 September 1974, three days after suffering a ruptured cerebral aneurysm at her father's funeral. Many U2 songs, including "I Will Follow", "Mofo", "Out of Control", "Lemon" and "Tomorrow", focus on the loss of his mother. He said "because of the way I grew up in Finglas—sleeping on a couch, or because my mother died when I was a kid, I was in the house on my own a lot of the time, so I'd knock on the door of the Hanveys at teatime, or the Rowens at lunchtime." At age 15, he secured his first job, with the local Superquinn supermarket; he later worked for the father of his friend Derek Rowen (later the artist Guggi).

During his childhood and adolescence, Bono and his friends were part of a surrealist street gang called "Lypton Village". Two of his closest childhood friends, "Guggi" (Derek Rowen) and the musician Gavin Friday, lived on the same street; Guggi was also in Lypton Village. The gang had a ritual of giving nicknames. Bono had several names: first, he was known as "Steinhegvanhuysenolegbangbangbang", then just "Huyseman", followed by "Houseman", "Bon Murray", "Bono Vox of O'Connell Street", and finally just "Bono". "Bono Vox" is a modified form of Bonavox, which is the name of a hearing aid shop just off Dublin's principal street, O'Connell Street. The name derives from the Latin phrase for "good voice". The nickname was given by Guggi; Bono initially disliked it but after learning of its translation, he accepted it. Hewson has been known as "Bono" since the age of 14 or 15. In addition to it being his stage name, close family, friends and fellow band members also refer to him as Bono.

After Bono left school, his father told him he could live at home for one year, but if he was not able to pay his own way, he would have to leave the house.

== Musical career ==
=== U2 ===
On 25 September 1976, Bono, David Evans ("The Edge"), his brother Dik Evans, and Adam Clayton responded to an advertisement on a bulletin board at Mount Temple posted by fellow student Larry Mullen Jr. seeking people interested in forming a rock band. The band had occasional jam sessions in which they did covers of other bands. Tired of long guitar solos and hard rock, Bono wanted to play the Rolling Stones and the Beach Boys songs. The band could not play covers very well, so they started writing their own songs.

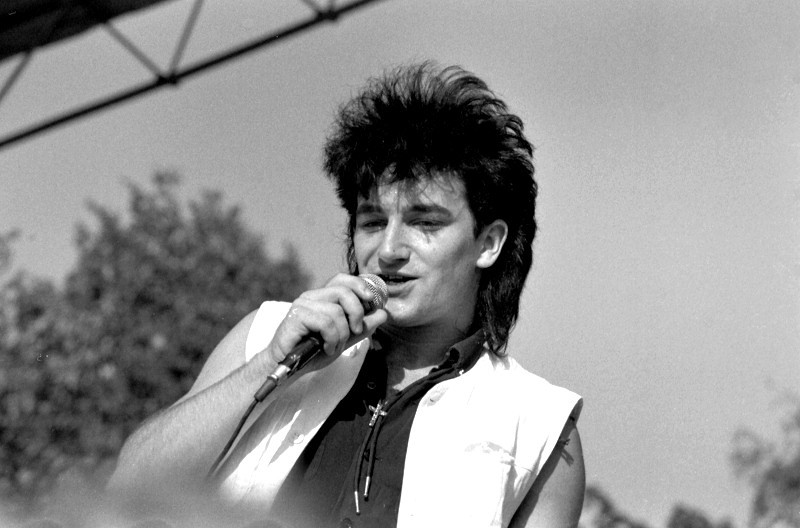
Bono on stage in 1983

The band went by the name "Feedback" for a few months, before changing to "The Hype" later on. After Dik Evans left the group to join another local band, the Virgin Prunes, the remaining four officially changed the name from "The Hype" to "U2". Initially, Bono sang, played guitar and wrote the band's songs. He said of his early guitar playing in a 1982 interview, "When we started out I was the guitar player, along with the Edge—except I couldn't play guitar. I still can't. I was such a lousy guitar player that one day they broke it to me that maybe I should sing instead. I had tried before, but I had no voice at all. I remember the day I found I could sing. I said, 'Oh, that's how you do it.'" When The Edge's guitar playing improved, Bono was relegated mostly to the microphone, although he occasionally still plays rhythm guitar and harmonica. As of 2006, Bono has taken piano lessons from his children's piano teacher as a means to improve his songwriting.

On 13 July 1985, U2 performed at the Live Aid benefit concert at Wembley Stadium before a crowd of 72,000 fans and a worldwide television audience of 1.5 billion people. During a 12-minute performance of "Bad", Bono climbed down from the stage to embrace and dance with a female fan he had picked out of the crowd, showing television viewers the personal connection that he could make with audiences. Bono's impromptu departure from the stage extended the length of "Bad", cutting into their allotted time and forcing them to drop "Pride (In the Name of Love)", their biggest hit at the time, from their setlist. The group initially regarded the concert as a missed opportunity, but many journalists called their performance one of the show's highlights; The Guardian cited Live Aid as the event that made stars of U2 and their performance as one of 50 key events in rock history.

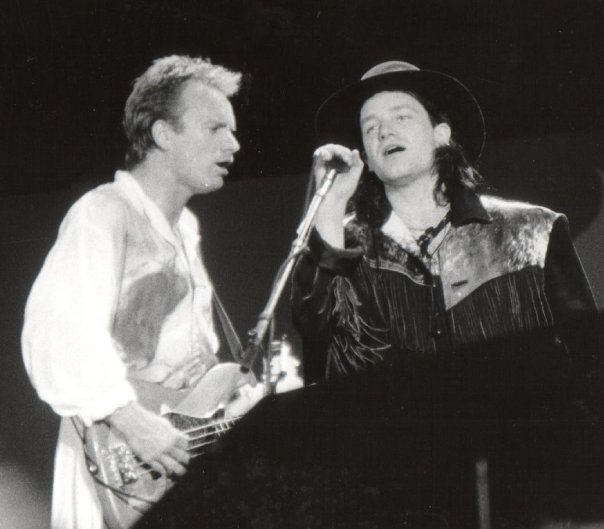
Bono (right) with Sting during A Conspiracy of Hope in 1986

Bono writes the lyrics for almost all U2 songs, which often have social and political themes. His lyrics frequently allude to a religious connection or meaning, evident in songs such as "Gloria" from the band's album October and "I Still Haven't Found What I'm Looking For" from The Joshua Tree. During the band's early years, Bono was known for his rebellious tone which turned to political anger and rage during the band's War, The Joshua Tree, and Rattle and Hum eras. Following the Enniskillen bombing that left 11 dead and 63 injured on 8 November 1987, the Provisional IRA paramilitaries threatened to kidnap Bono. IRA supporters also attacked a vehicle carrying the band members. These acts were in response to his speech condemning the Enniskillen bombing during a live performance of "Sunday Bloody Sunday". Bono had been advised to cut his on-stage outburst from the Rattle and Hum film, but it was left in.

The film also contains footage of the band's 11 November 1987 free "Save the Yuppies" concert at Justin Herman Plaza in San Francisco, during which Bono spray-painted "Rock N Roll Stops the Traffic" on the Vaillancourt Fountain sculpture. Bono was criticised by Mayor Dianne Feinstein and faced a misdemeanour for defacing public property. He apologised in a written statement to local officials, and the band's promoter Bill Graham agreed to pay to clean up the graffiti. With the band feeling a sense of musical stagnation towards the end of the Lovetown Tour, Bono hinted at changes to come during a 30 December 1989 concert; before a hometown crowd in Dublin, he said on stage that it was "the end of something for U2", and that "we have to go away and ... dream it all up again".

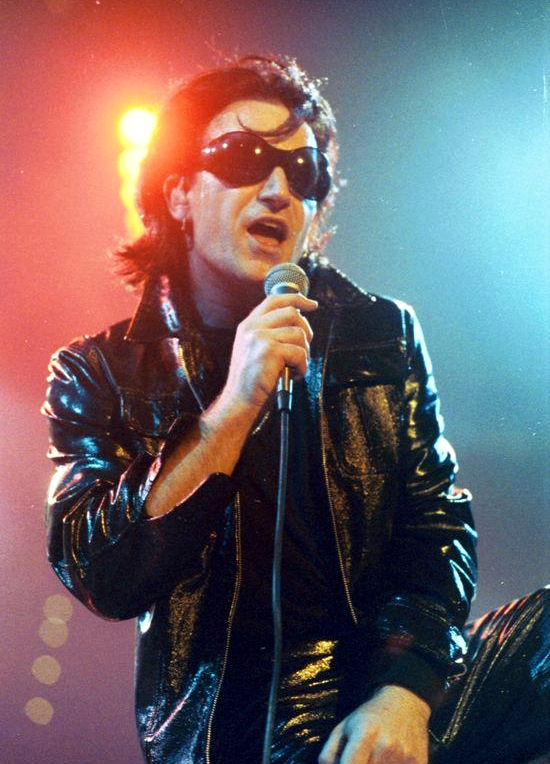
Bono as his alter-ego "The Fly" on the Zoo TV Tour in 1992

U2's sound and focus dramatically changed with their 1991 album, Achtung Baby. Bono's lyrics became more personal, inspired by experiences related to the private lives of the members of the band. During the band's 1992–1993 Zoo TV Tour, Bono assumed a number of costumed stage personae in an attempt to be more lighthearted and escape the group's reputation of being overly serious and self-righteous. Bono said: "All through the Eighties we tried to be ourselves and failed when the lights were on. Which is what set us up for Zoo TV. We decided to have some fun being other people, or at least other versions of ourselves." Bono's primary persona during the tour was "the Fly", which originated from him wearing an oversized pair of blaxploitation sunglasses, given to him by wardrobe manager Fintan Fitzgerald, to lighten the mood in the studio. He developed the persona into a leather-clad egomaniac, and described his outfit as having Lou Reed's glasses, Elvis Presley's jacket, and Jim Morrison's leather trousers. To match the character's dark fashion, Bono dyed his naturally-brown hair black. In contrast to his earnest stage demeanour of the 1980s, as the Fly, Bono strutted around the stage with "swagger and style", exhibiting mannerisms of an egotistical rock star. He often stayed in character as the Fly away from the stage, including for public appearances and when staying in hotels.

For his "Mirror Ball Man" stage character, Bono dressed in a shining silver lamé suit with matching shoes and cowboy hat. The character was meant to parody greedy American televangelists, showmen, and car salesman, and was inspired by Phil Ochs' Elvis persona from his 1970 tour. Bono said that the character represented "a kind of showman America. He had the confidence and charm to pick up a mirror and look at himself and give the glass a big kiss. He loved cash and in his mind success was God's blessing." Mirror Ball Man appeared during encores of concerts in 1992 and made prank calls from the stage, often to the White House in an attempt to reach U.S. President George H. W. Bush. Bono portrayed this alter ego on the first three legs of the tour, but replaced him with "MacPhisto" in 1993. MacPhisto was created to parody the devil and was named after Mephistopheles of the Faust legend. As MacPhisto, Bono wore a gold lamé suit with gold platform shoes, pale makeup, lipstick, and devil's horns on his head. As the character, Bono spoke with an exaggerated upper-class English accent, similar to that of a down-on-his-luck character actor. According to him, "We came up with a sort of old English Devil, a pop star long past his prime returning regularly from sessions on The Strip in Vegas and regaling anyone who would listen to him at cocktail hour with stories from the good old, bad old days." As MacPhisto, Bono continued his routine of making in-concert prank calls, targeting local politicians and mocking them by engaging them in character as the devil; he said, "When you're dressed as the Devil, your conversation is immediately loaded, so if you tell somebody you really like what they're doing, you know it's not a compliment."

During performances, Bono attempts to interact with the crowd as often as possible. He is known for pulling audience members onto the stage or moving himself down to the physical level of the audience. In 2005, during U2's Vertigo Tour stop in Chicago, he pulled a boy onto the stage during the song "An Cat Dubh / Into the Heart". Bono has often allowed fans to come on stage and perform songs with the band.

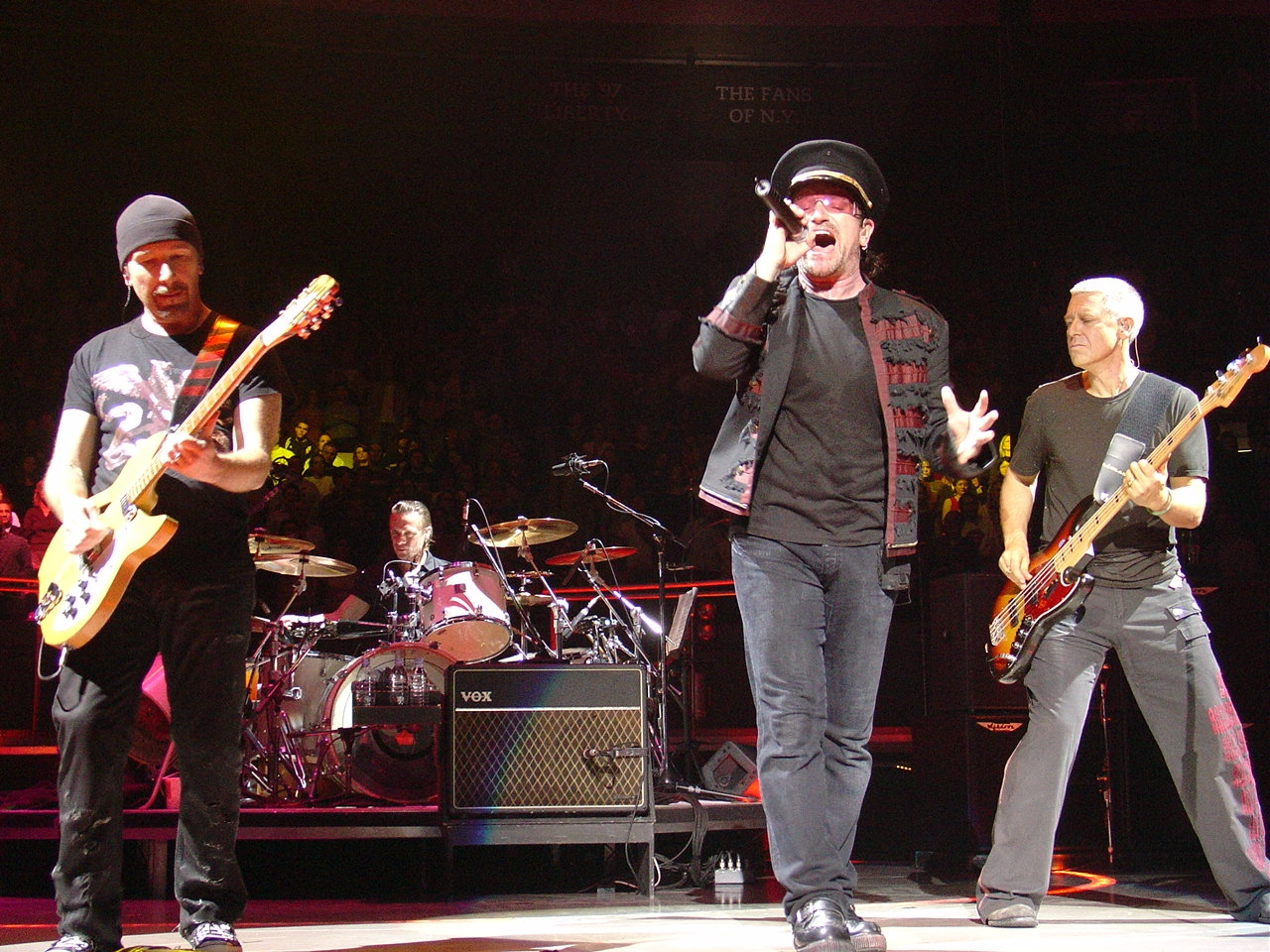
U2 performing at Madison Square Garden in November 2005

While accepting the 2003 Golden Globe Award for Best Original Song for "The Hands That Built America", Bono called the award "really, really fucking brilliant!" during the live television broadcast. In response, the Parents Television Council condemned Bono for his profanity and started a campaign for its members to file complaints with the FCC. Although Bono's use of "fuck" violated FCC indecency standards, the FCC refused to fine NBC because the network did not receive advance notice of the consequences of broadcasting such profanity and the profanity in question was not used in its literal sexual meaning. In apparent reaction to the refusal, a group of congressmen introduced House Resolution 3687, the "Clean Airwaves Act", on 8 December 2003, aiming to amend section 1464 of title 18 of the United States Code to provide an explicit list of profane words and phrases and remove ambiguity that could enable certain uses of the phrases to be allowed. The bill was not enacted. The incident has had a long-term impact on the handling of profanity on live broadcasts.

U2 were criticised in 2007 for moving part of their multimillion-euro song catalogue from Ireland to Amsterdam six months before Ireland ended a tax exemption on musicians' royalties. Under Dutch tax law, bands are subject to low to non-existent tax rates. U2 manager Paul McGuinness stated that the arrangement was legal and customary and businesses often sought to minimise their tax burdens. The move prompted criticisms in the Irish parliament. The band later responded by stating that approximately 95% of their business took place outside Ireland, and that they were taxed globally because of this. Bono was one of several wealthy figures whose tax arrangements were singled out for criticism in a report by the charity Christian Aid in 2008.

=== Solo ===
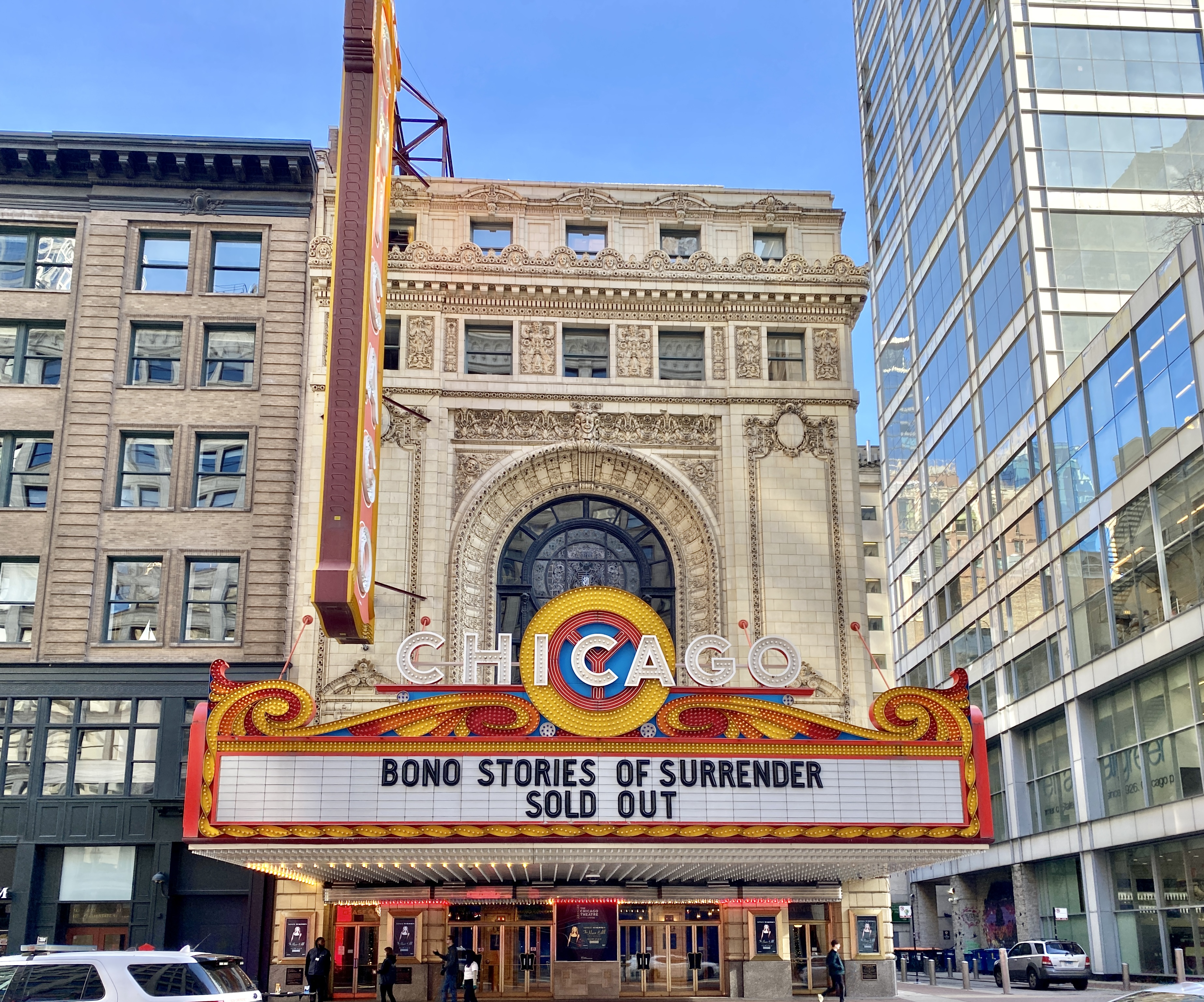
The marquee of the Chicago Theatre, prior to a November 2022 performance during his Stories of Surrender tour

In November 2022, Bono embarked on a 14-date book tour across North America and Europe called "Stories of Surrender" to promote his memoir Surrender: 40 Songs, One Story. For the shows, he recited and acted out passages from his book and performed U2 songs in stripped-down arrangements. Though described as a "one-man show", the performances were aided by musicians Kate Ellis (cello, keyboards, vocals), Gemma Doherty (harp, keyboards, vocals), and U2 producer Jacknife Lee ("musical director" – keyboards, percussion). Bono continued the tour with a residency of 11 shows at the Beacon Theatre in New York City from April to May 2023, which grossed $6.8 million. The shows were filmed for a documentary film, Bono: Stories of Surrender, which was released on Apple TV+ on 30 May 2025. It was also made available as an Apple Immersive Video for the Apple Vision Pro headset, making it the first feature-length film to be released in the format. Bono also released an EP of the same name with live performances of three songs to coincide with the film's release.

=== Collaborations ===
In addition to his work with U2, Bono has received co-writing or singing credits on 80 solo and collaborative works. He has worked with artists that include Frank Sinatra, Johnny Cash, Willie Nelson, Luciano Pavarotti, Sinéad O'Connor, Green Day, Tom Petty, Roy Orbison, Bob Dylan, Patti Smith, Tina Turner, B.B. King, Zucchero, Ray Charles, Quincy Jones, Kirk Franklin, Bruce Springsteen, Tony Bennett, Clannad, the Corrs, Wyclef Jean, Kylie Minogue, Carl Perkins, and Herbert Grönemeyer. On Robbie Robertson's 1987 eponymous album, he played bass guitar on one track, and sang on another. For Michael Hutchence's 1999 posthumous eponymous album, Bono and producer Andy Gill completed the unfinished song "Slide Away" by writing an additional verse and recording vocals by Bono. In 2015, he collaborated with African stars D'banj, Waje and Omotola Jalade Ekeinde for a women's empowerment song entitled "Strong Girl".

Bono and the Edge have written and recorded several songs together outside of U2. They wrote the musical score for the Royal Shakespeare Company's London stage adaptation of A Clockwork Orange, which opened in 1990. The duo also wrote the eponymous theme song of the 1995 James Bond film GoldenEye, which was performed by Tina Turner. Bono and the Edge ventured into theatre again when they composed the music and lyrics for the Broadway musical Spider-Man: Turn Off the Dark; they were featured on the soundtrack's single "Rise Above 1" with Reeve Carney in 2011. The duo collaborated with Jay-Z and Rihanna for the 2010 song "Stranded (Haiti Mon Amour)", which benefitted the Hope for Haiti Now relief telethon for the 2010 Haiti earthquake. Bono and the Edge were featured on the song "We Are the People" by Dutch DJ Martin Garrix, which served as the official song of the UEFA Euro 2020 tournament and was released on 14 May 2021.

On 17 March 2020, Bono performed a new song, "Let Your Love Be Known", via livestream to fans during the COVID-19 pandemic. On 24 March, the song was released on YouTube, retitled "#SING4LIFE", as a collaboration with will.i.am, Jennifer Hudson, and Yoshiki. Bono has worked with numerous hip-hop artists, including DMX on his 2021 song "Skyscrapers" and Lil Wayne on his 2025 song "The Days". For Halsey's 2025 For My Last Trick: The Tour, Bono voiced the Rabbit character during a series of Alice in Wonderland-themed interstitial videos between songs.

== Musical style ==
=== Vocals ===
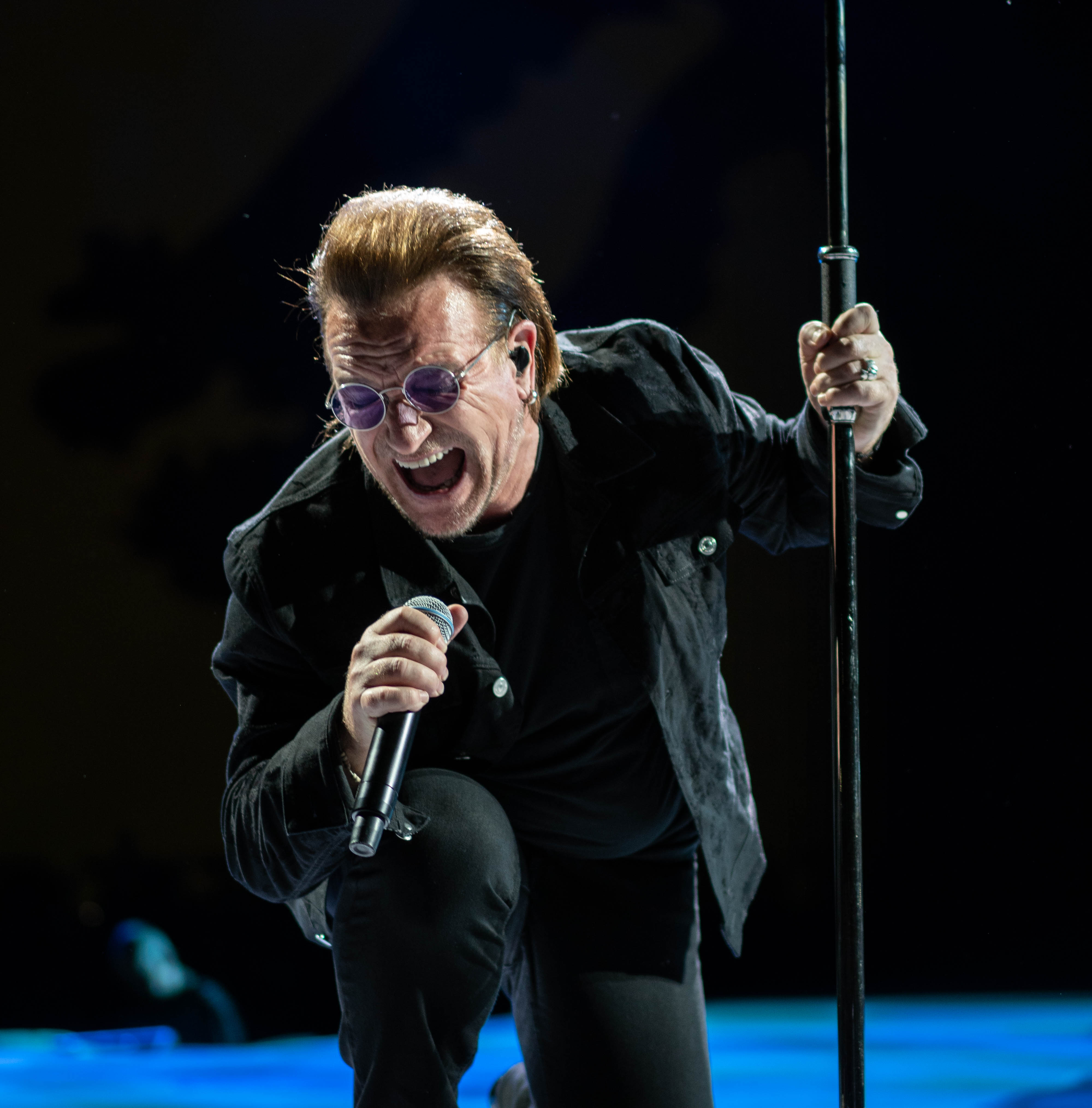
Bono performing in Amsterdam in July 2017

Bono is known for his impassioned vocal style, often delivered in a high register through open-throated belting. Bono has been classified as a tenor, and according to him has a three-octave vocal range; one analysis found it to span from C♯_{2} to G♯_{5} on studio recordings over the course of his career. He frequently employs "whoa-oh-oh" vocalisations in his singing. Rock musician Billie Joe Armstrong of Green Day said: "He's a physical singer, like the leader of a gospel choir, and he gets lost in the melodic moment. He goes to a place outside himself, especially in front of an audience, when he hits those high notes." He added that Bono is "not afraid to go beyond what he's capable of".

In the early days of U2, Bono unintentionally developed an English vocal accent as a result of him mimicking his musical influences such as Siouxsie and the Banshees. He said: "I still think that I sing like Siouxsie from The Banshees on the first two U2 albums. But I found my voice through Joey Ramone at that gig in Dublin. I stood there and heard him singing. He sang a bit like a girl too. It was all going to be OK after all. That was my way in." His vocal style evolved during the band's exploration of roots music for The Joshua Tree; Spin said that he learned to command "the full whisper-to-shout range of blues mannerisms". Bono attributed this maturation to "loosening up", "discover[ing] other voices", and employing more restraint in his singing. For "Where the Streets Have No Name", Bono varied the timbre of his voice extensively and used rubato and controlled vibrato to vary its timing, while author Susan Fast found "With or Without You" to be the first track on which he "extended his vocal range downward in an appreciable way".

Bono continued to explore a lower range in the 1990s, using what Fast described as "breathy and subdued colors" for Achtung Baby. One technique used on the album is octave doubling, in which his vocals are sung in two different octaves, either simultaneously or alternating between verses and choruses. According to Fast, this technique introduces "a contrasting lyrical idea and vocal character to deliver it", leading to both literal and ironic interpretations of Bono's vocals. On tracks such as "Zoo Station" and "The Fly", his vocals were highly processed, giving them a different emotional feel from his previous work. Bono said that lowering his voice helped him find a new vocal vocabulary, as he previously felt limited to "certain words and tones" by his tenor voice. His singing on Zooropa was an even further departure from U2's previous style; throughout the record, Bono "underplay[ed] his lung power", according to Jon Pareles, and he also used an operatic falsetto he calls the "Fat Lady" voice on the tracks "Lemon" and "Numb". As he has aged, Bono has continued to evolve his singing, relying more on "the croon than the belt", according to Rolling Stone's Joe Gross.

=== Equipment ===
In the early years of U2, Bono used a black Fender Lead 2 guitar connected to a Roland Bolt amplifier model Bolt 60.

He has used a Shure SM58 Premier S2 radio microphone in live performances; this was replaced by the Shure UHF-R series and he now uses a B58 capsule instead of the SM58 capsule. He is known to record in the studio with a standard Shure SM58 microphone.

== Activism and philanthropy ==
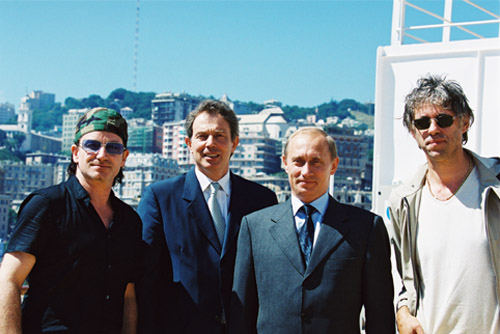
Bono with heads of government Tony Blair and Vladimir Putin, and musician/activist Bob Geldof in 2001

Bono has been involved in philanthropy and activism for human rights and social justice causes, both as a member of U2 and as an individual. He explained that he was motivated to become involved in social and political causes by seeing one of the Secret Policeman's Ball benefit shows, staged by Monty Python member John Cleese and producer Martin Lewis for the human-rights organisation Amnesty International in 1979. Bono stated, "I saw The Secret Policeman's Ball and it became a part of me. It sowed a seed...".

In 1984, musician Bob Geldof enlisted Bono to participate in the Band Aid charity single "Do They Know It's Christmas?"; Bono reprised his singing role for the 2004 Band Aid 20 and 2014 Band Aid 30 singles of the same name. In July 1985, U2 performed at the Live Aid charity concert, which was organised by Geldof to benefit the Ethiopian famine; he and Bono later collaborated to organise the 20th anniversary Live 8 concerts in 2005, at which U2 also performed.

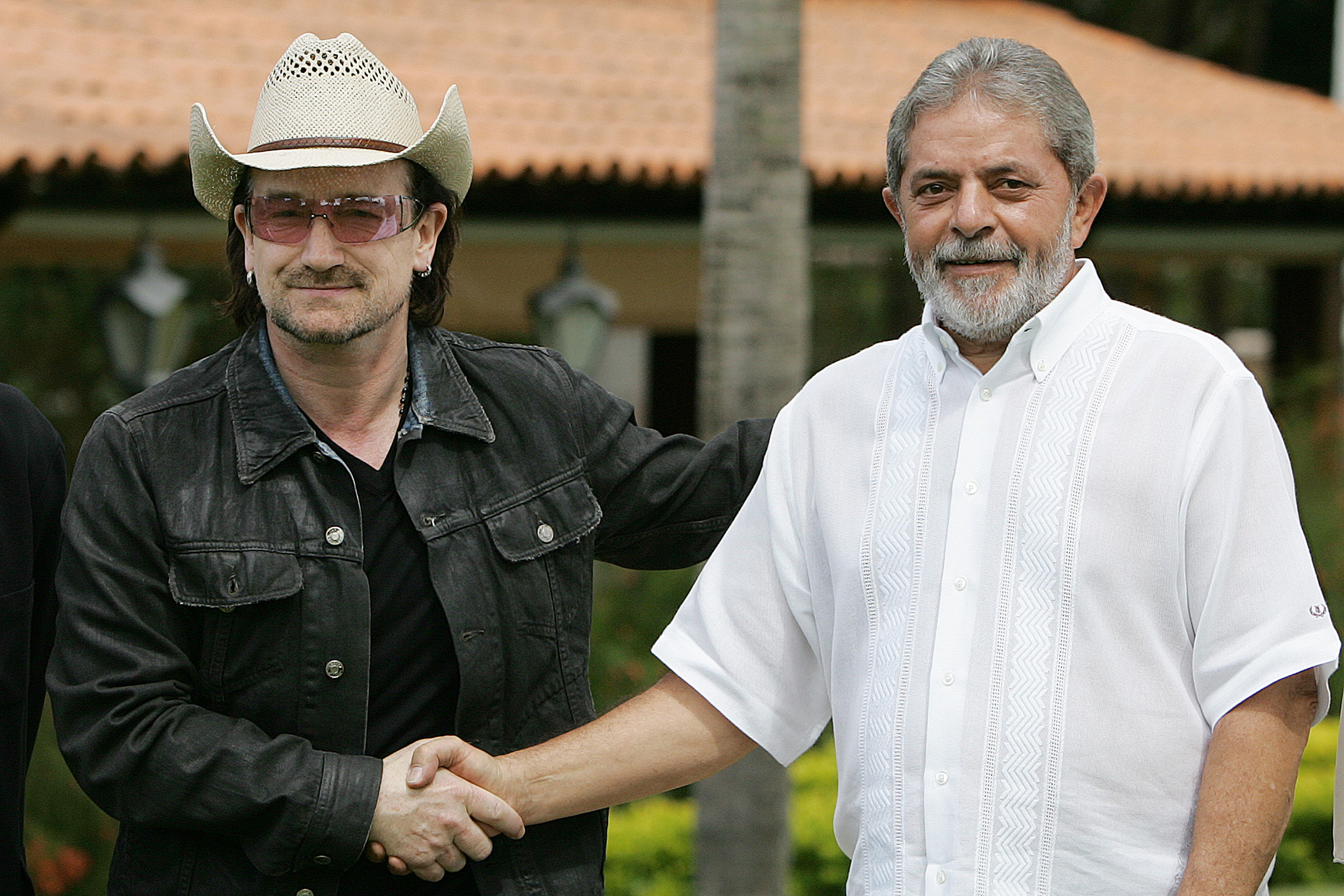
Bono with then-President Lula da Silva of Brazil in 2006

From September to October 1985, Bono and his wife Ali Hewson made a humanitarian visit to Africa, spending a month working at a feeding centre in Ajibar, Ethiopia. Along with other volunteers, they developed an educational programme consisting of songs and one-act plays to teach Ethiopian children important information about issues such as health and hygiene. During the trip, he also became aware of the corruption, trade agreements, and debts that were all claimed to be contributing factors to the famine and poverty in Africa. The trip was cited as fueling Bono's passion for African issues that would come to characterise his future philanthropic and activist efforts.

In 1986, Bono and U2 performed on Amnesty International's Conspiracy of Hope Tour of benefit concerts in the United States, alongside musicians such as Sting and Bryan Adams.

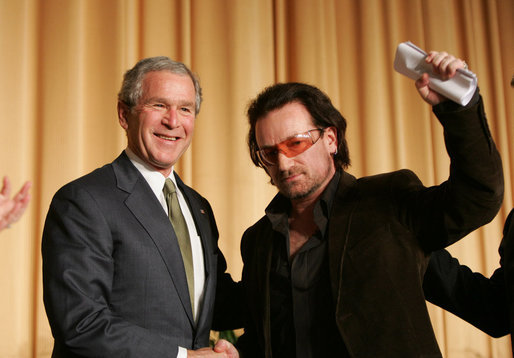
Bono and then-U.S. President George W. Bush in 2006

Since 1999, Bono has become increasingly involved with raising awareness of the plight of Africa and campaigning on its behalf. From 1999 to 2000, Bono was involved with the Jubilee 2000 coalition, working as an activist on its Drop the Debt campaign. He met with U.S. Treasury Secretary Lawrence Summers, and with U.S. Republican politicians such as Jesse Helms, John Kasich, Orrin Hatch, J. Dennis Hastert, and Dick Armey in an effort to secure bipartisan support for the U.S. forgiving the debt of developing countries. He has met with several influential politicians, including former U.S. President George W. Bush and former Canadian Prime Minister Paul Martin. During a March 2002 visit to the White House, Bono lobbied Bush to provide financial assistance to developing countries. The following year, Bush signed legislation authorising the President's Emergency Plan for AIDS Relief program, which has been credited with saving 17 million lives over its lifetime. Bush told Bono that the initiative "never would have made it out of Congress had [Bono] not been engaged".

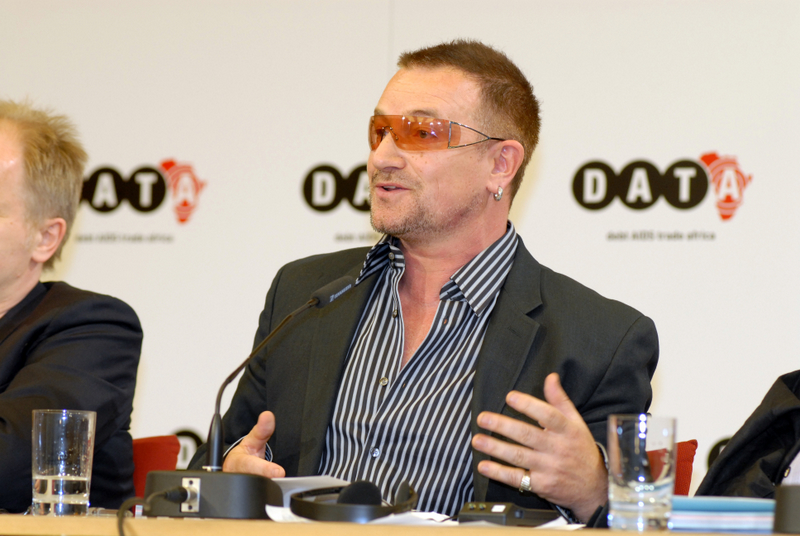
Bono at a 2007 press conference for his NGO DATA

The advocacy non-government organisation (NGO) DATA (Debt, AIDS, Trade, Africa) was established in 2002 by Bono and Bobby Shriver, along with activists from Drop the Debt. The organisation was funded by the Bill & Melinda Gates Foundation, George Soros, and Edward W. Scott. In 2004, Bono and Shriver co-founded the One Campaign, with the aim of eliminating extreme poverty and disease in Africa by building citizen support. The organisation received a $3 million grant from the Bill & Melinda Gates Foundation. In 2006, Bono and Shriver collaborated again to found (Red), an organization that licenses the Product Red brand to partner companies to raise money for the Global Fund to Fight AIDS, Tuberculosis and Malaria. Each company creates a product with the Product Red logo, and a percentage of the profits from the sale of these labelled products benefit the Global Fund. Partner companies include American Express, Apple, Converse, Motorola, Microsoft, Dell, The Gap, Giorgio Armani, Nike, and Starbucks; Bono was involved with securing most of Red's corporate partners. In October 2007, it was announced that DATA and One Campaign would merge in the United States and that the new organization would be known simply as One. Red currently operates as a sister organisation of One. As of December 2018, One has 10 million members, 3 million of whom are in Africa. As of December 2020, Red has generated $650 million to support HIV/AIDS grants. In 2023, Bono announced he would leave the board of directors of the One Campaign at the end of the year.

In 2005, Bono recorded a version of "Don't Give Up" with Alicia Keys, with proceeds going to Keep a Child Alive.

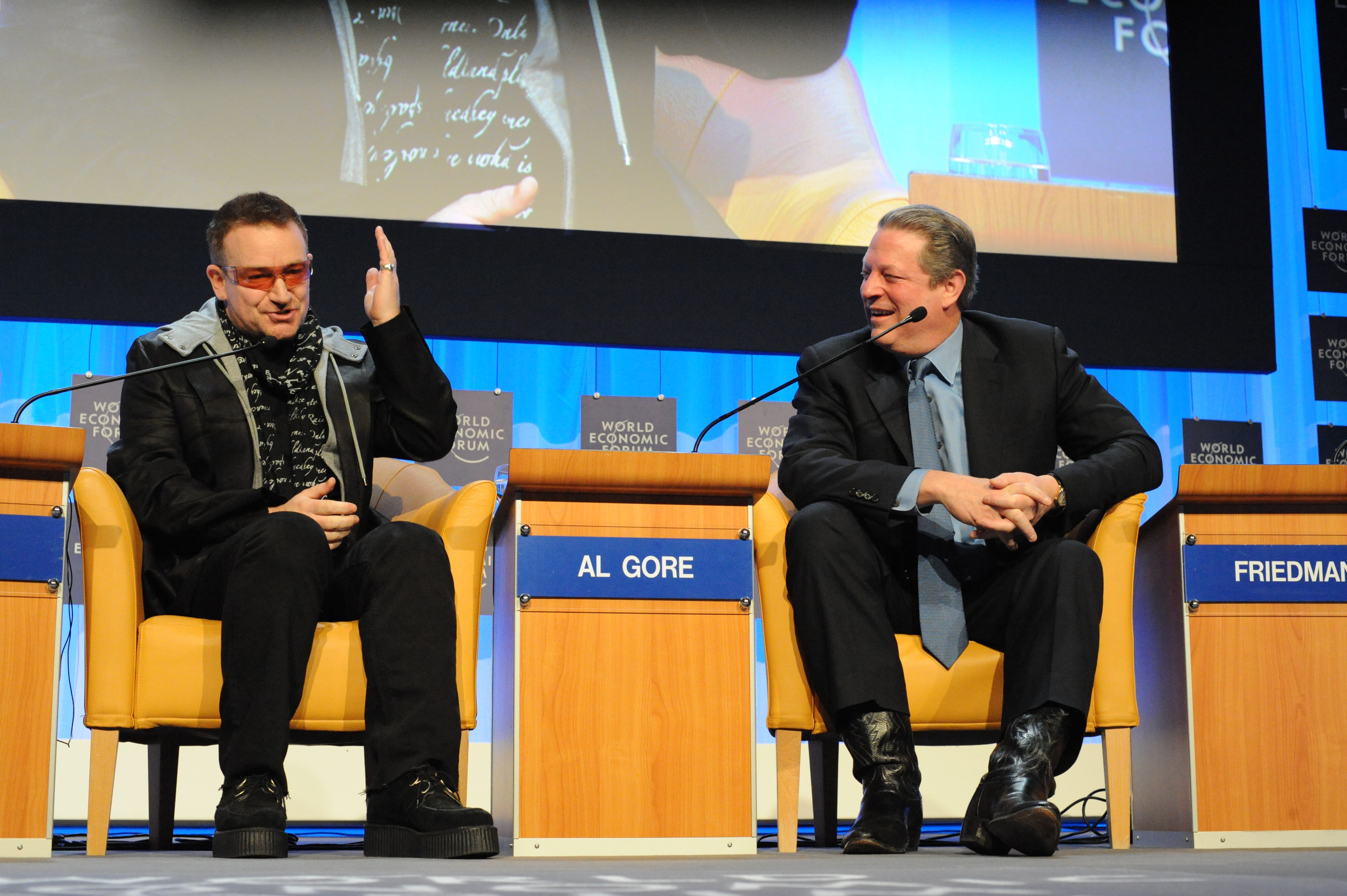
Bono with Al Gore at the 2008 World Economic Forum annual meeting in Davos

Bono has spoken at numerous events on behalf of his activist efforts. He spoke at the 54th Annual National Prayer Breakfast on 2 February 2006, encouraging the care of the socially and economically depressed and calling for an extra one per cent tithe of the United States' national budget. He has made multiple appearances at the World Economic Forum annual meeting in Davos, Switzerland.

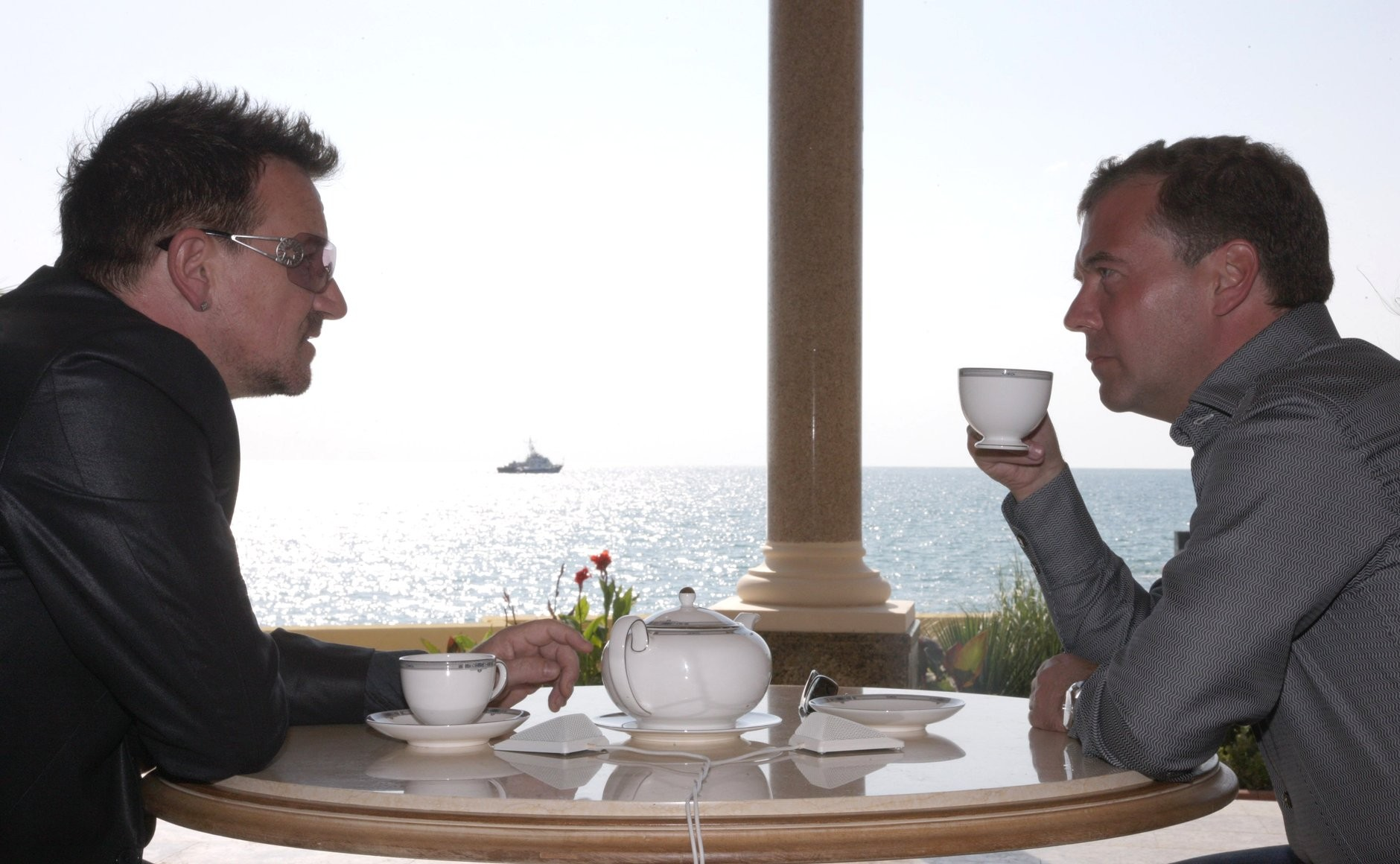
Bono with Russian President Dmitry Medvedev in Sochi, 24 August 2010

Bono was a special guest editor of the July 2007 issue of Vanity Fair magazine, named "The Africa Issue: Politics & Power". It featured an assortment of 20 different covers, with photographs by Annie Leibovitz of a number of celebrities, political leaders, and philanthropists, each showcasing their contributions to humanitarian relief in Africa.

In 2021, Bono lent his voice to One's animated series Pandemica, which was created to raise awareness of the importance of vaccines in ending the COVID-19 pandemic and the inequalities in worldwide vaccine availability.

In 2022, Bono supported Ukraine's resistance to being invaded by Russia. A poem written by Bono about Saint Patrick and the 2022 Russian invasion of Ukraine was recited by Nancy Pelosi at a White House event for Saint Patrick's Day, on 17 March 2022. The poem was widely derided by the public. In early April, Bono and the Edge recorded an acoustic rendition of "Walk On" for Global Citizen's Stand Up for Ukraine livestream, which was organised to urge world leaders to raise funds for Ukrainian refugees. On 8 May 2022, as a show of solidarity for Ukrainians and at the invitation of Ukrainian president Volodymyr Zelenskyy, Bono and the Edge performed in a Kyiv metro station that was being used as a makeshift bomb shelter. In January 2026, Bono wrote a column for the Atlantic calling for the release of the imprisoned Palestinian political leader Marwan Barghouti, comparing him to Nelson Mandela.

=== Efficacy and analysis ===
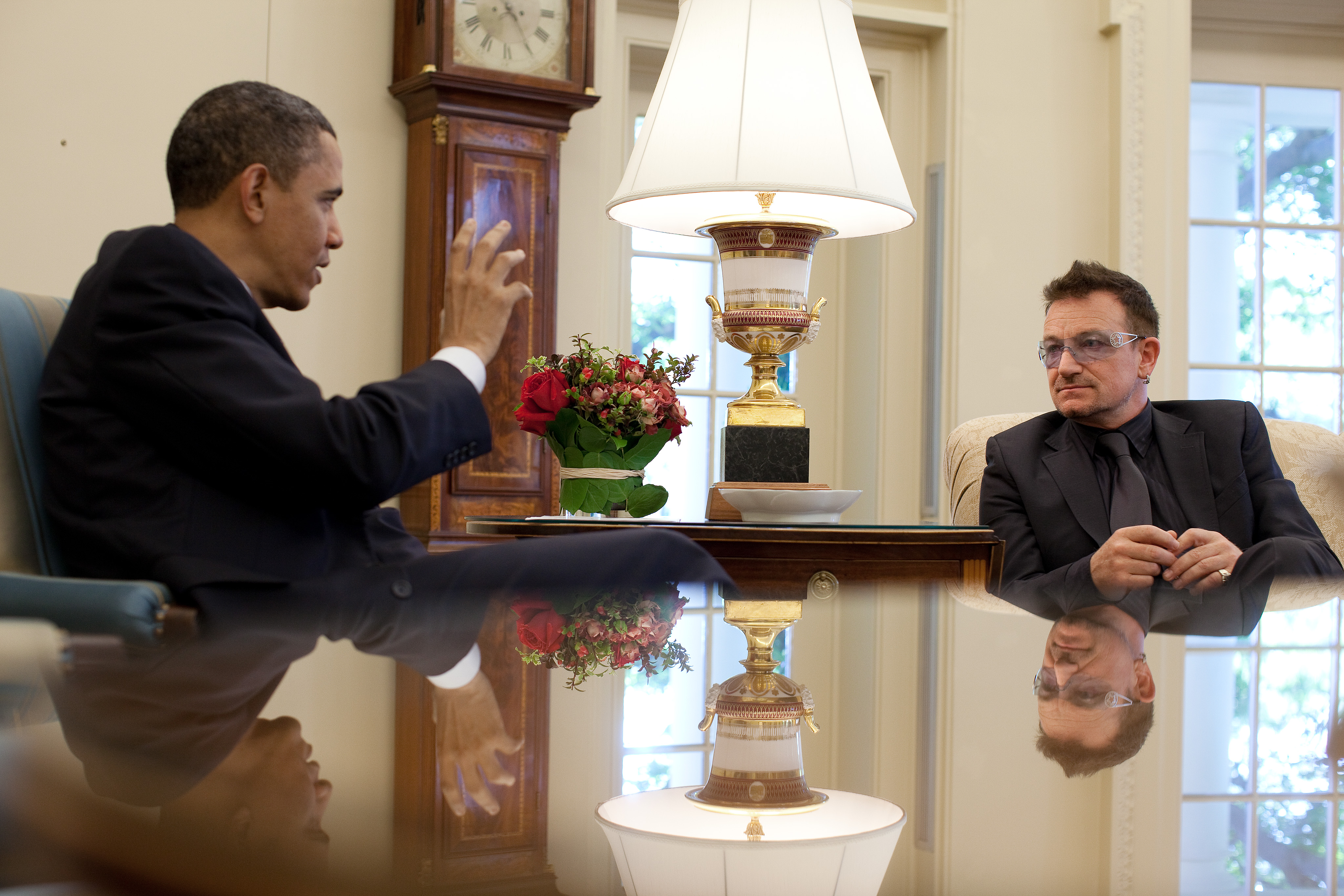
Bono meeting with US President Barack Obama in 2010

Bono has become one of the world's best-known philanthropic performers and was named the most politically effective celebrity of all time by the National Journal. He has been dubbed "the face of fusion philanthropy", both for his success enlisting powerful allies from a diverse spectrum of leaders in government, religious institutions, philanthropic organisations, popular media, and the business world, as well as for spearheading new organizational networks that bind global humanitarian relief with geopolitical activism and corporate commercial enterprise.

On 15 December 2005, Paul Theroux published an op-ed in The New York Times called "The Rock Star's Burden" (cf. Kipling's "The White Man's Burden") that criticised stars such as Bono, Brad Pitt, and Angelina Jolie, labelling them as "mythomaniacs, people who wish to convince the world of their worth." Theroux, who lived in Africa as a Peace Corps volunteer, added that "the impression that Africa is fatally troubled and can be saved only by outside help—not to mention celebrities and charity concerts—is a destructive and misleading conceit."

In February 2006, Bono responded to his critics by calling them "cranks carping from the sidelines. A lot of them wouldn't know what to do if they were on the field. They're the party who will always be in opposition so they'll never have to take responsibility for decisions because they know they'll never be able to implement them."

In an article in Bloomberg Markets in March 2007, journalists Richard Tomlinson and Fergal O'Brien noted that Bono used his band's 2006 Vertigo world tour to promote his ONE Campaign while at the same time "U2 was racking up $389 million in gross ticket receipts, making Vertigo the second-most lucrative tour of all time, according to Billboard magazine ... Revenue from the Vertigo tour is funnelled through companies that are mostly registered in Ireland and structured to minimise taxes."

Further criticism came in November 2007, when Bono's various charity campaigns were targeted by Jobs Selasie, head of African Aid Action. Selasie claimed that these charities had increased corruption and dependency in Africa because they failed to work with African entrepreneurs and grassroots organisations, and as a result, Africa has become more dependent on international handouts.

== Other creative endeavours ==
=== Art ===
Bono sketches and paints as a hobby. He developed his art style by drawing and painting on photographs, which he learned from his father who used to add colour to black-and-white instant film photographs of his wife. Describing Bono's interest in visual artwork, The Atlantic's editor-in-chief Jeffrey Goldberg said, "He just walks around with an iPad and sketches everything."

Bono and his daughters Jordan and Eve provided original paintings for a 2003 book adaptation of Peter and the Wolf, which accompanied a musical release by Bono's friend Gavin Friday and Maurice Seezer. A CD-book package was released in November 2003. Bono's paintings, which were inspired by the 2001 death of his father, were auctioned at Christie's in New York. Proceeds from the sales of the paintings and CD-book package benefitted the Irish Hospice Foundation.

Bono's drawings of his musical influences were featured in a December 2022 issue of The Atlantic in an article profiling him. The following year, Goldberg commissioned him to illustrate the cover of The Atlantic's June 2023 issue for a story about Ukrainian president Volodymyr Zelenskyy. Bono's artwork, a line-drawing sketched portrait of Zelenskyy in the colours of the Ukrainian flag, was inspired by protest art and political posters. U2 also sold merchandise featuring the portrait, including T-shirts, posters, and hoodies, with all proceeds benefiting United24 to purchase ambulances for Ukraine.

=== Film ===
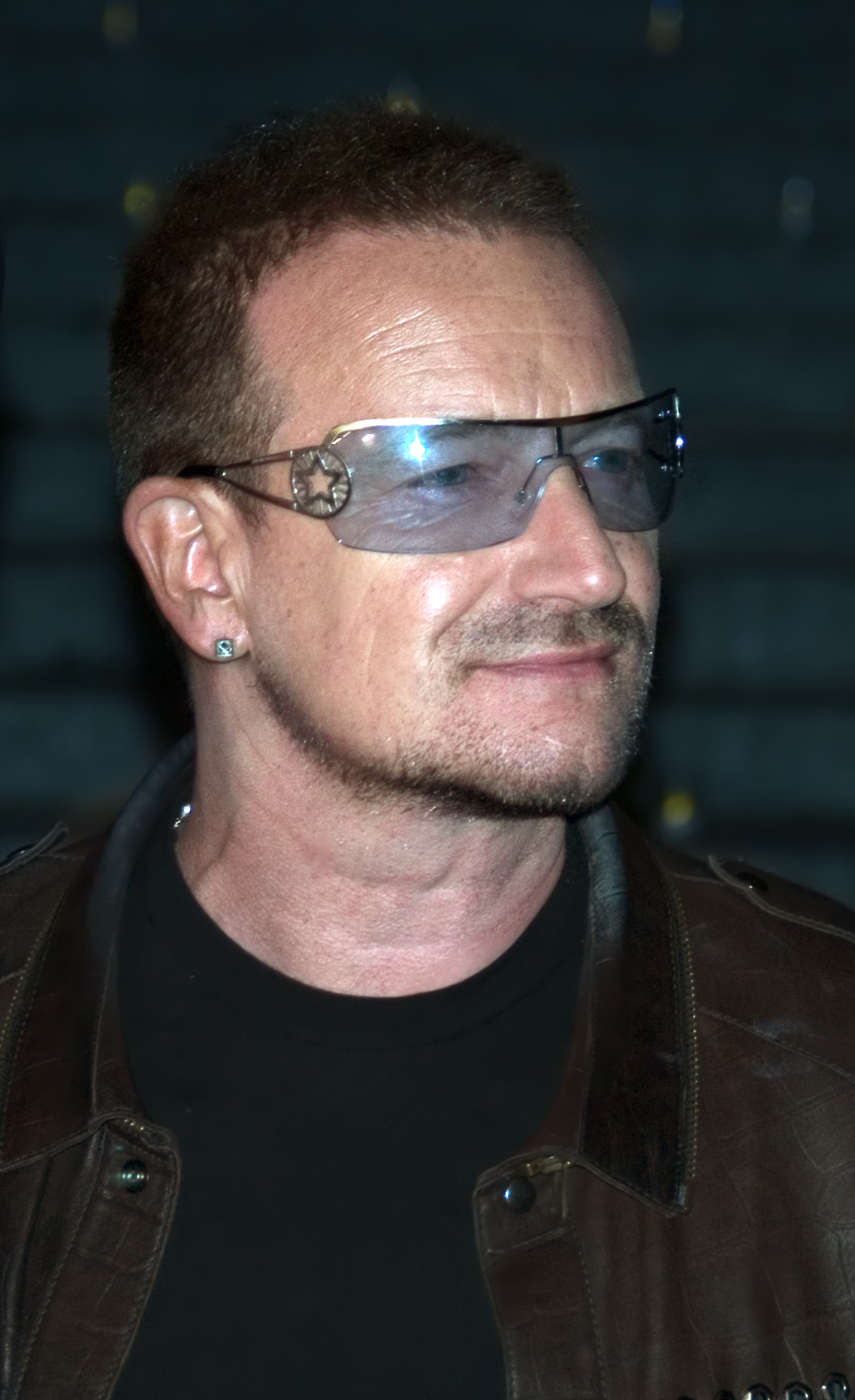
Bono at the 2009 Tribeca Film Festival

Bono was an executive producer of Bill Carter's 1995 documentary film Miss Sarajevo. Carter had previously enlisted U2's help in bringing attention to the Siege of Sarajevo during their 1993 concerts on the Zoo TV Tour. Bono was also executive producer of the 2000 film The Million Dollar Hotel, which was developed from a story by himself and Nicholas Klein. It starred Jeremy Davies, Milla Jovovich, and Mel Gibson.

In the 2007 musical film Across the Universe, Bono made a cameo appearance during a psychedelic sequence, portraying the character "Dr. Robert" and singing the Beatles' "I Am the Walrus". Bono served as an executive producer of the 2018 film Waiting for the Miracle to Come. Bono participated in the 2019 documentary Pavarotti, in which he expressed his admiration for the titular Italian tenor Luciano Pavarotti.

Bono voiced a character in the 2021 animated musical film Sing 2, the lion rock legend Clay Calloway. In April 2023, Max and Cartoon Network greenlit a short animated film adaption of Peter & the Wolf with artwork based on Bono's original illustrations for his 2003 book. The project features narration and music by Friday.

=== Writings ===
Bono's memoir, Surrender: 40 Songs, One Story, was released on 1 November 2022, and was promoted with a book tour called "Stories of Surrender". The book debuted at number two on The New York Times nonfiction best-seller list for the week ending 5 November 2022. For his work narrating the audiobook version of Surrender, Bono won the Audiobook of the Year honour at the 2024 Audie Awards. An abridged and updated version of the book with a new introduction was released in paperback under the title Bono: Stories of Surrender, as a tie-in to the Apple TV+ film of the same name released in May 2025.

== Business ventures ==
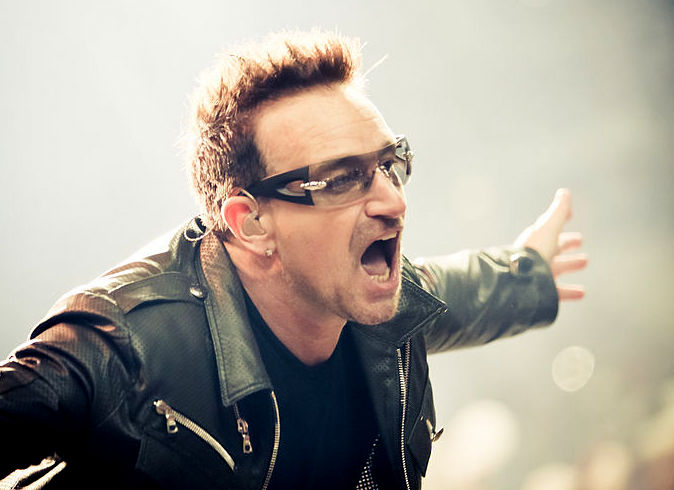
Bono performing with U2 in 2011

In 1992, Bono, along with the Edge, bought and refurbished Dublin's two-star 70-bedroom Clarence Hotel, and converted it into a five-star 49-bedroom hotel. In 2019, they sold the hotel leasehold, and four years later, they sold the property. Bono and McKillen are also co-owners of Clós Nua Ltd., a company that owns the Tramyard site in Dalkey and plans to redevelop it.

In 2005, Bono, Ali Hewson, and designer Rogan Gregory co-founded the EDUN fashion label ("nude" spelled backwards, to suggest both "natural" and the Garden of Eden). It was intended to help bring about positive change in Africa through a fair trade-based relationship rather than by direct aid.

Bono was a board member of the Elevation Partners private-equity firm, which attempted to purchase Eidos Interactive in 2005 and subsequently invested in other entertainment businesses. Bono was an investor in the Forbes Media group in the U.S. through Elevation Partners; his firm took a minority stake in Forbes Media, which encompassed the 89-year-old business that includes Forbes magazine, the Forbes.com website, and other assets. The terms of the deal were not disclosed, but reports said the stake was worth about €194 million ($250 million). Elevation Partners also owned a 1.5 per cent stake in social networking site Facebook, originally purchased for $210 million. Although it was reported that Bono's stake was valued at approximately US$1 billion in February 2012, a 2015 article in Forbes stated that this estimate was based on an incorrect attribution of shares.

In 2016, Bono invested in and joined the board of directors of the "Rise Fund", a new $2 billion impact investment fund founded by TPG. Rise's investments fell across seven sectors, including agriculture, education, and healthcare, and were made into companies making "a measurable positive social and/or environmental impact". In 2019, Bono and TPG announced the creation of Y Analytics, a company intended to measure the social and environmental impacts of investments.

Bono was among those named in the 2017 Paradise Papers after he was identified as an investor in Nude Estates, which bought a shopping mall in Lithuania in 2007 and transferred ownership to Nude Estates 1 in Guernsey, in an apparent attempt to avoid tax. Bono welcomed the subsequent investigation by the Lithuanian tax authority, saying that transparency was necessary and he had personally campaigned for it. Nude Estates paid €53,000 in taxes and fines after the investigation was completed and Bono severed ties with the company.

In September 2019, Bono joined the board of directors of Zipline.

== Awards and recognition ==
Bono has won numerous awards with U2, including 22 Grammy Awards and two Golden Globe Awards for Best Original Song (for "The Hands That Built America" in 2003 and "Ordinary Love" in 2014). In 2005, Bono was inducted into the Rock and Roll Hall of Fame as a member of U2, in the group's first year of eligibility. Bono has been recognised by music critics on several rankings of greatest singers and frontmen. Among singers, Q ranked him the 26th-greatest, Consequence of Sound ranked him the 32nd-greatest, and Mojo ranked him 57th-greatest. Rolling Stone ranked him the 32nd-greatest singer in 2008, and the 140th-greatest in 2023. Among frontmen, Billboard ranked him the 9th-greatest lead singer in rock history, Gigwise ranked him the 45th-greatest frontman, and Steven Hyden of Uproxx ranked him the 16th-greatest lead singer. In 2015, Rolling Stone ranked Bono and the Edge at number 35 on its list of the 100 Greatest Songwriters of All Time.

In 2003, Bono received the Legion of Honour from the French government, and the MusiCares Person of the Year award. The following year he was awarded the Pablo Neruda International Presidential Medal of Honour from the Government of Chile. Time included Bono on its annual Time 100 list of the most influential people in 2004 and 2006. In 2005, the magazine named him, Bill and Melinda Gates the Persons of the Year. Also in 2005, he received the Portuguese Order of Liberty for his humanitarian work. That year Bono was also among the first three recipients of the TED Prize, which grants each winner a "wish to change the world". Bono made three wishes, the first two related to the One Campaign and the third that every hospital, health clinic, and school in Ethiopia could be connected to the Internet. TED rejected the third wish as being a sub-optimal way for TED to help Africa and instead organised a TED conference in Arusha, Tanzania. Bono attended the conference, which was held in June 2007.

In 2004, Bono was given an honorary Doctor of Laws degree from the University of Pennsylvania.

In 2007, Bono received several honours. At the 38th NAACP Image Awards, he won the Chairman's Award. He was named in the UK's New Year Honours List as an honorary Knight Commander of the Order of the British Empire. He was formally granted honorary knighthood on 29 March in a ceremony at the residence of British Ambassador David Reddaway in Dublin, Ireland. On 27 September, Bono and DATA received the Philadelphia Liberty Medal for their humanitarian efforts. While accepting the honour, Bono said, "When you are trapped by poverty, you are not free. When trade laws prevent you from selling the food you grew, you are not free." Bono donated the $100,000 prize to DATA; Ngozi Okonjo-Iweala accepted the prize on the organisation's behalf.

On 11 December 2008, Bono received the annual Man of Peace prize, which is awarded by several Nobel Peace Prize laureates in Paris, France.

Time ranked Bono 8th on its list of the "Most Influential Celebrities" in 2013; he was the only person from the music industry in the Top 10. In July 2013, he was honoured by the French government as a Commandeur de Ordre des Arts et des Lettres, the country's highest cultural honour.

In 2016, Glamour named him "Man of the Year", breaking the 26-year tradition that saw the "Woman of the Year" accolade reserved only for women. Bono was recognized for establishing a campaign called "Poverty is Sexist", which is "specifically aimed at helping the world's poorest women". In 2018, he was the first recipient of the George W. Bush Medal for Distinguished Leadership, which was awarded by Bush's Presidential Center; the honour was in recognition of Bono's humanitarian work against poverty and HIV/AIDS.

On 1 April 2022, Bono received the 2021 J. William Fulbright Prize for International Understanding from the Fulbright Association in recognition of his activist efforts.

In January 2025, Bono was awarded the Presidential Medal of Freedom, the highest civilian honour in the United States, by President Joe Biden. A statement on whitehouse.gov called Bono a "pioneering activist against AIDS and poverty" and credited him with creating bipartisan support for the U.S. PEPFAR program for AIDS relief.

== Personal life ==
=== Family life ===
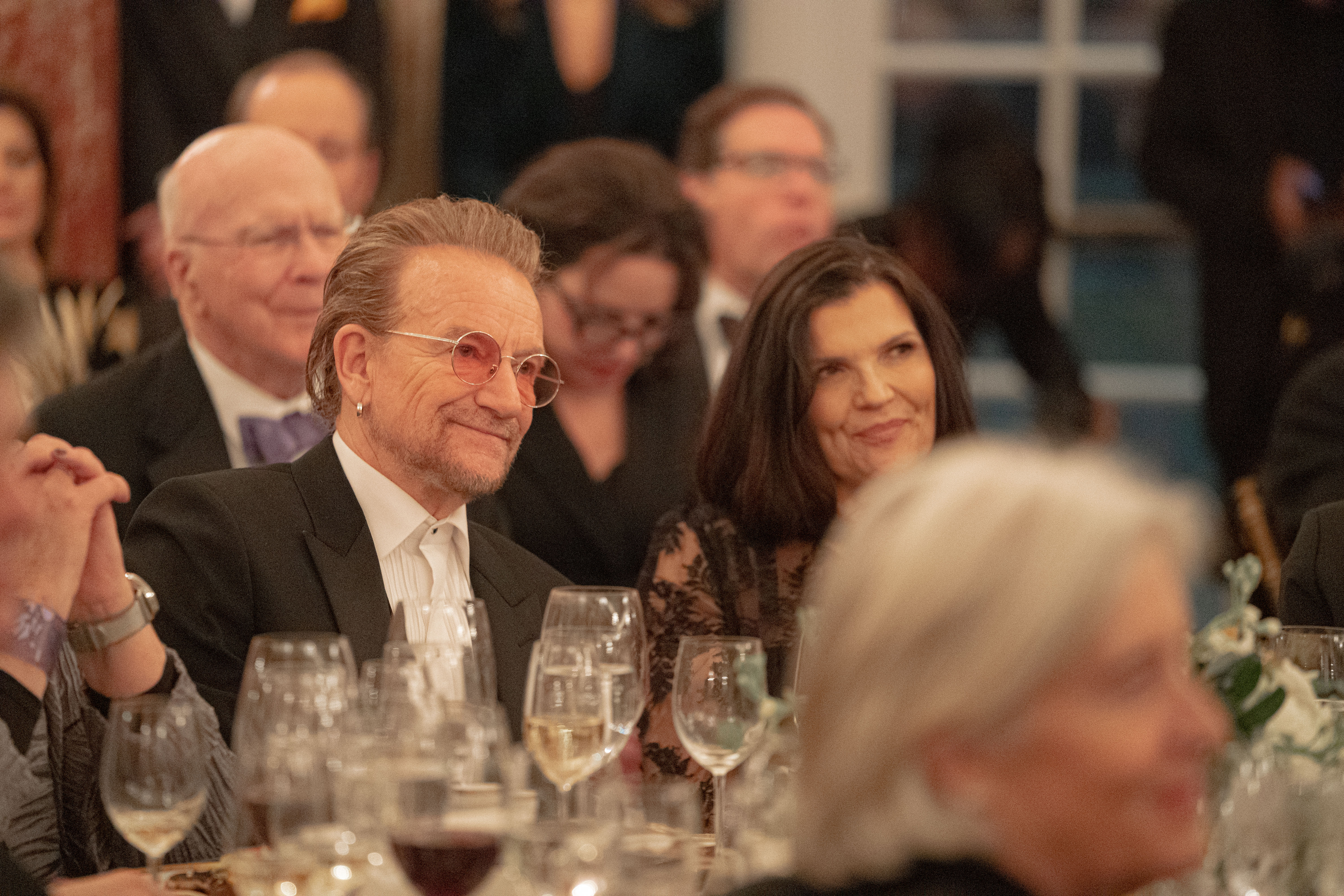
Bono and his wife Ali Hewson at the 2022 Kennedy Center Honors Dinner

At the age of thirteen, Bono met Alison "Ali" Stewart, who was one year below him at Mount Temple Comprehensive School. After the September 1974 death of his mother left him emotionally adrift and in conflict with his father and brother, Stewart began taking care of him. In 1976, Bono and Stewart began dating. The pair split up briefly but reunited. Their relationship became more serious as she accompanied him in his efforts to break through in the music industry, and by 1979 they were discussing marriage, conditional upon his career becoming established.

"Our marriage has worked because we like each other, because we talk to each other, and we are passionate about what we do. We allow each other to pursue our goals. I wouldn't want to be married to someone who wasn't happy with what they were doing in life, and B wouldn't either. I have learned a lot about what it means to be married, how great it can be if you persevere. We're very close. He says I'm very good with the dog whistle."

— Ali Hewson describing her marriage, 2005

Stewart and Bono married on 31 August 1982 in a Church of Ireland ceremony at All Saints Church in her home area, Raheny. The ceremony combined rituals of both conventional Protestantism and the Shalom Friendship Christian group that Bono and other U2 members had belonged to. U2 was in debt to their record label Island Records so the couple could not afford a honeymoon, but the label's founder Chris Blackwell gave them use of the Goldeneye estate he owned in Jamaica. After returning to Ireland, the couple moved to a small mews house in Howth, which they shared with the rest of U2.

The couple have four children: daughters Jordan (born 10 May 1989) and Eve (born 7 July 1991) and sons Elijah Bob Patricius Guggi Q (born 17 August 1999) and John Abraham (born 20 May 2001). Elijah is the lead vocalist and guitarist in the rock band Inhaler, while Eve is an established actress.

=== Residences ===
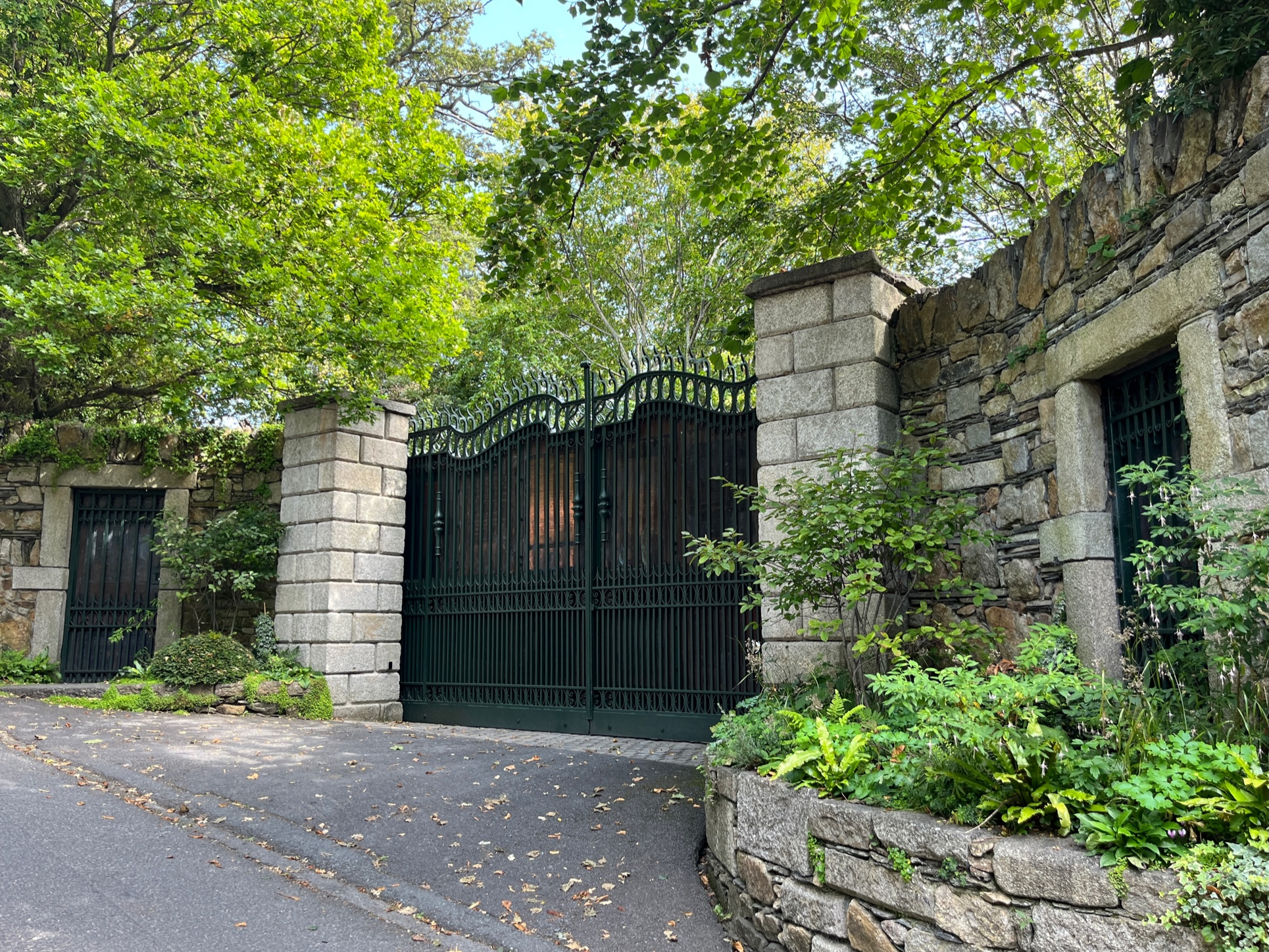
The gates of Bono and Ali Hewson's principal property, Temple Hill, on Vico Road, Killiney, County Dublin

After leaving the Howth peninsula, Bono and Ali bought a Martello tower in Bray in northern County Wicklow, south of Dublin. Since the 1980s, they have maintained a primary home on Vico Road, in the affluent Dublin suburb of Killiney. The house, Temple Hill, is located on the slopes of Killiney Hill and has views of Killiney Bay. Bono's childhood friend Gavin Friday lives next door. Some years after the original purchase, the Hewsons bought one neighbouring house, Curlews, and shortly after, a second, the castellated Lios Beag.

Bono and Ali also own residences in the south of France and New York. In the late 1980s or early 1990s, Bono bought a top-floor duplex apartment in Manhattan's San Remo apartment building from Steve Jobs for $15 million. Jobs had renovated it for his own use, but never moved in. In 1993, Bono and the Edge co-purchased a seafront house in Èze-sur-Mer in the south of France.

"Spending time with Bono was like eating dinner on a train—feels like you're moving, going somewhere. Bono's got the soul of an ancient poet and you have to be careful around him. He can roar 'till the earth shakes. He's also a closet philosopher...talks about the rightness, the richness, glory, beauty, wonder and magnificence of America."

— Bob Dylan, 2005

=== Faith ===
In 2013, when discussing his faith in Jesus Christ, Bono said that Christ was either who he claimed he was or he was "a complete and utter nutcase". As early as 2005, Bono was invoking this argument, identified as the "Lewis trilemma".

=== Health and safety ===
Bono is almost never seen in public without sunglasses, as he has had glaucoma since the 1990s; this also makes him sensitive to flash photography. During a Rolling Stone interview, he stated:

[I have] very sensitive eyes to light. If somebody takes my photograph, I will see the flash for the rest of the day. My right eye swells up. I've a blockage there, so that my eyes go red a lot. So it's part vanity, it's part privacy, and part sensitivity.

In January 1996, Bono was aboard a Grumman HU-16 aeroplane flown by musician Jimmy Buffett named Hemisphere Dancer that was shot at by Jamaican police, who believed the craft to be smuggling marijuana. The aircraft, which sustained minimal damage, was also carrying Ali Hewson, her and Bono's two daughters, Chris Blackwell, and co-pilot Bill Dindy. The Jamaican government acknowledged the mistake and apologized.

In May 2010, while rehearsing for a North American leg of the U2 360° Tour, Bono suffered a herniated disk and severe compression of the sciatic nerve, and he was taken to a clinic in Munich for emergency neurosurgery. The North American tour was postponed and rescheduled for 2011.

On 16 November 2014, Bono was involved in a "high energy bicycle accident" when he attempted to avoid another rider in New York's Central Park. Bono was rushed to NewYork–Presbyterian Hospital/Weill Cornell Medical Center's Emergency Department and underwent "multiple X-rays and CAT scans" followed by five hours of surgery. Bono sustained fractures of the shoulder blade, humerus, orbit and pinky finger. Orthopaedic trauma surgeon Dean Lorich, MD, stated that "[Bono] was taken urgently to the operating room... where the elbow was washed out and debrided, a nerve trapped in the break was moved and the bone was repaired with three metal plates and 18 screws." Bono posted to U2's official website, "As I write this, it is not clear that I will ever play guitar again", as reported in Cycling Weekly.

In 2016, during the recording sessions for U2's album Songs of Experience, Bono had what the Edge called a "brush with mortality"; as a result of the episode, he decided to rework the album's lyrics. The Irish Times reported that sometime in late 2016 between Christmas and New Year's Day, Bono had a near-death experience. At the time, he did not specify what had happened, but in his 2022 memoir Surrender: 40 Songs, One Story, he revealed that he had undergone open-heart surgery due to a "blister" that formed over time in his aorta as a result of having a bicuspid aortic valve. The eight-hour operation was performed by David H. Adams at Mount Sinai Hospital, and Bono made a full recovery.

== Discography ==
Year	Title	Album
1985	"Silver and Gold" (with Keith Richards and Ronnie Wood)	Sun City
1992	"Can't Help Falling in Love"	Honeymoon in Vegas
1995	"Hallelujah"	Tower of Song: The Songs of Leonard Cohen
1995	"Save the Children"	Inner City Blues: The Music of Marvin Gaye
1997	"Dreaming with Tears in Your Eyes"	The Songs of Jimmie Rodgers: A Tribute
2000	"Never Let Me Go" (with the MDH Band); "Falling at Your Feet" (with Daniel Lanois); "Dancin' Shoes" (with the MDH Band)	The Million Dollar Hotel
2011	"Rise Above 1" (Reeve Carney featuring Bono and The Edge)	Spider-Man: Turn Off the Dark
2012	"Bulletproof Pride" (K'naan featuring Bono)	Country, God or the Girl
2021	"We Are the People" (Martin Garrix featuring Bono and The Edge)	Non-album single
2021	"Eden (To Find Love)"	Citizen Penn
2025	"The Days" (Lil Wayne featuring Bono)	Tha Carter VI

== Filmography ==
Year	Film	Role	Notes
1988	Rattle and Hum	Himself	Rockumentary
1998	The Simpsons	Himself	TV series; one episode, "Trash of the Titans"
1999	Classic Albums	Himself	TV series; one episode, "The Joshua Tree"
1999	Entropy	Himself	
2000	The Million Dollar Hotel	Man in the hotel lobby	Uncredited cameo appearance, original storywriter, producer
2000	Sightings of Bono	Himself	Short film
2005	Entourage	Himself	TV series; one episode, "I Love You Too"
2007	Rewind	Himself	Rockumentary
2007	Across the Universe	Dr. Robert	Sang the Beatles songs "I Am the Walrus" and "Lucy in the Sky with Diamonds"
2007	American Idol	Himself	TV series; "Idol Gives Back"
2008	U2 3D	Himself	3D concert film
2009	Entourage	Himself	TV series; one episode, "Give a Little Bit"
2009	Brüno	Himself	Mockumentary comedy film
2011	From the Sky Down	Himself	Rockumentary
2011	Anton Corbijn Inside Out	Himself	
2012	B.B. King – The Life of Riley	Himself	Documentary
2012	The Resurrection of Victor Jara	Himself	Documentary
2013	Arcade Fire in Here Comes The Night Time	Win Butler impersonator	NBC Special
2013	Who the F**K Is Arthur Fogel	Himself	Documentary
2013	Muscle Shoals	Himself	Documentary
2017	Lost in London	Himself	Voice cameo
2019	Pavarotti	Himself	Documentary
2021	Sing 2	Clay Calloway	Voice role
2023	Bono & The Edge: A Sort of Homecoming with Dave Letterman	Himself	Documentary
2024	Kiss the Future	Himself	Documentary
2024	Stevie Van Zandt: Disciple	Himself	Documentary
2025	Bono: Stories of Surrender	Himself	Documentary

In addition to his acting credits, Bono has contributed music to films, as part of U2 and other collaborations.

== Honours ==
- (Chev. L.H.) (Knight): Chevalier dans l'Ordre de la Légion d'honneur (Knight in the Order of the Legion of Honour), France (28 February 2003)
- (OL): Oficial da Ordem da Liberdade (Officer of the Order of Liberty), Portugal (21 April 2005)
- (KBE) Honorary Knight Commander of the Most Excellent Order of the British Empire, United Kingdom (20 January 2007)
- Commandeur dans l'Ordre des Arts et des Lettres (Commander in the Order of Arts and Letters), France (16 July 2013)
- Presidential Medal of Freedom, United States (4 January 2025)

== See also ==
- List of Irish people
- List of Irish Grammy Award winners and nominees
- List of people from Dublin
- List of peace activists
- A. bonoi, a species of spider in the genus Aptostichus named after Bono
