= Debt jubilee =

Clearance of debt from public records

A debt jubilee is one form of debt relief, specifically a clearance of debt from public records across a wide sector or a nation. Such a jubilee was proposed as a solution to debt incurred or anticipated during the COVID-19 recession. The American economist Michael Hudson is a proponent of a debt jubilee, writing in a Washington Post op-ed that it was an alternative to a depression. Similarly, anthropologist David Graeber pointed to kings' historical use of debt jubilees during regime changes to suggest that a debt jubilee would have been an appropriate response to the 2008 financial crisis. Another proponent of debt jubilee is Australian economist Steve Keen.

== History of debt relief ==
The earliest known debt cancellation was proclaimed by Enmetena of Lagash c. 2400 BCE. Similar measures were enacted by later Sumerian, Babylonian and Assyrian rulers of Mesopotamia, where they were known as "freedom decrees" (ama-gi in Sumerian).

== See also ==
- Jubilee (biblical)
- Jubilee 2000
- Seisachtheia
- Write-down
