= Liberty Medal =

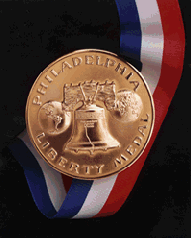
- Philadelphia Liberty Medal
- Location: Philadelphia
- Country: United States
- Presented by: National Constitution Center (NCC)
- First award: 1989
- Website: http://www.constitutioncenter.org/libertymedal
- Ribbon of the medal

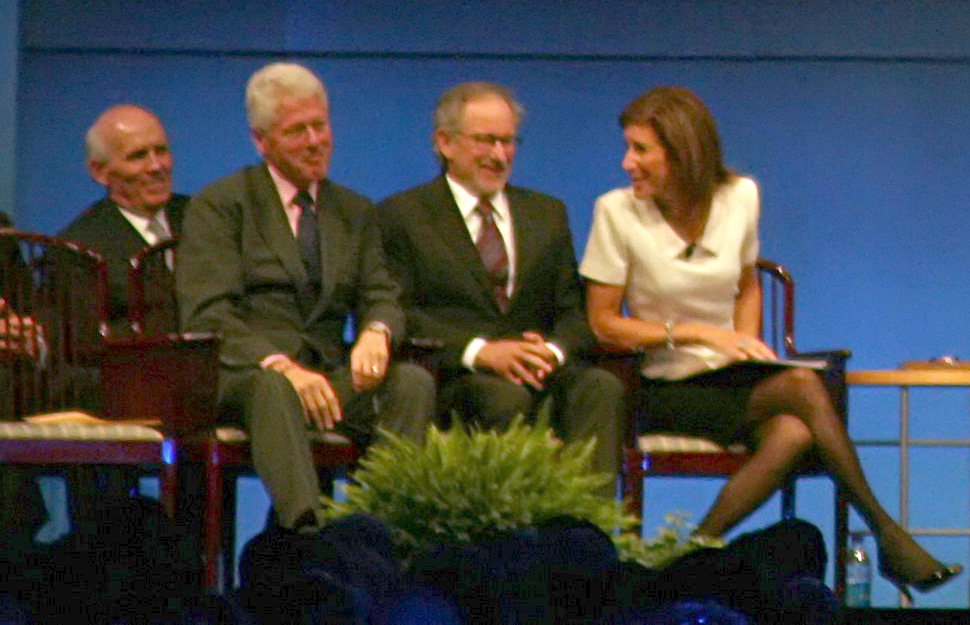
Bill Clinton and Steven Spielberg at the 2009 ceremony

The Liberty Medal is an annual award administered by the National Constitution Center (NCC) of the United States to recognize people "of courage and conviction who strive to secure the blessings of liberty for people around the globe." The award was founded by the Philadelphia Foundation in 1989. The first recipient was Polish leader Lech Wałęsa. In 2006 the NCC took over the organizing, selecting and presenting of the award to recipients. Recipients are now chosen by the NCC and its board of trustees.

== List of recipients ==
Year	Country	Name
2026	United States; Peru; Holy See	Pope Leo XIV
2025	United States	Hamilton and Ron Chernow
2024	United States	Ken Burns
2023	United States	Judy Woodruff and David Rubenstein
2022	Ukraine	Volodymyr Zelenskyy
2021	Hong Kong	Jimmy Lai
2021	Saudi Arabia	Loujain al-Hathloul
2020	United States	Ruth Bader Ginsburg
2019	United States	Anthony Kennedy
2018	United States	George W. Bush and Laura Bush
2017	United States	John McCain
2016	United States	John Lewis
2015	Tibet	14th Dalai Lama
2014	Pakistan	Malala Yousafzai
2013	United States	Hillary Clinton
2012	United States	Muhammad Ali
2011	United States	Robert Gates
2010	United Kingdom	Tony Blair
2009	United States	Steven Spielberg
2008	Russia	Mikhail Gorbachev
2007	Ireland	Bono
2007	United Kingdom	DATA (Debt, AIDS, Trade, Africa)
2006	United States	George H. W. Bush
2006	United States	Bill Clinton
2005	Ukraine	Viktor Yushchenko
2004	Afghanistan	Hamid Karzai
2003	United States	Sandra Day O'Connor
2002	United States	Colin Powell
2001	Ghana	Kofi Annan
2000	United States	Dr. James D. Watson
2000	United Kingdom	Dr. Francis Crick
1999	South Korea	Kim Dae-jung
1998	United States	George J. Mitchell
1997	United States	CNN International
1996	Jordan	King Hussein
1996	Israel	Shimon Peres
1995	Japan	Sadako Ogata
1994	Czech Republic	Václav Havel
1993	South Africa	Nelson Mandela
1993	South Africa	Frederik Willem de Klerk
1992	United States	Thurgood Marshall
1991	Costa Rica	Óscar Arias Sánchez
1991	Switzerland	Médecins Sans Frontières
1990	United States	Jimmy Carter
1989	Poland	Lech Wałęsa

== See also ==
- Independence National Historical Park
