= Multilateral Debt Relief Initiative =

Multilateral Debt Relief Initiative (MDRI) was approved in June 2005 by the finance ministers of the G8 during the 31st G8 Summit, held at Gleneagles, Scotland. MDRI is different to HIPC, but operationally related. Countries in the termination point get full relief of their debt with IMF, International Development Association (IDA) and the African Development Bank (AfDB). MDRI was approved for encouraging debtor countries to continue their political reforms. For reasons of equal treatment of Low Income Countries (LIC) the relieved debts were counted when new ancillary remedies were guaranteed by IDA and AfDB. G8 members committed themselves to compensate IDA and AfDB refluxes with further remedies. These compensations will be shared among IDA and AfDB beneficiary countries according to the efforts they make (performance based allocation).

== How it works ==
IMF, IDA and AfDB fully relieve the debt of countries which attain (after complying with specific conditions that are detailed in HIPC page) termination point—the step where a country is eligible to receive total and irrevocable relief of its debt—in HIPC's frame.

The difference with HIPC consists of MDRI not covering all creditors, only IMF, IDA and AfDB. Besides, under MDRI, IMF also provided debt relief to non-HIPC countries whose per capita income did not exceed $380 and were indebted with IMF until the end of 2004. Thus a uniform treatment in IMF resources management is guaranteed.

== Cost ==
Total debt relief provided by IMF through MDRI lied around US$3.4 billion, in nominal terms. Besides IMF granted Liberia a debt relief of US$172 million as June 30, 2010. "26 HIPC countries that had reached the completion point as of June 2009 will receive $29 billion (in end-2008 net present value terms) in debt relief under the MDRI." As February 2, 2015, no pending debt rested eligible for MDRI, so its bills were liquidated and the remnants were transferred to the Disaster Relief and Contention Trust Fund.

== Participating countries ==
Thirty-seven countries have benefited from MDRI: Afghanistan, Benin, Bolivia, Burkina Faso, Burundi, Cameroon, Central African Republic, Chad, Comoros, Republic of Congo, Democratic Republic of Congo, Côte d’Ivoire, Ethiopia, The Gambia, Ghana, Guinea, Guinea-Bissau, Guyana, Haiti, Honduras, Liberia, Madagascar, Malawi, Mali, Mauritania, Mozambique, Nicaragua, Niger, Rwanda, Somalia, São Tomé & Príncipe, Senegal, Sierra Leone, Tanzania, Togo, Uganda, Zambia.

== See also ==
- Debt relief
- Odious debt
- Public debt
- Heavily indebted poor countries (HIPC)
- Millennium Development Goals
