= Heavily indebted poor countries =

IMF and World Bank classification for special eligibility

The states recognized as the heavily indebted poor countries (HIPC). Countries qualifying for full HIPC relief. Countries qualifying for partial HIPC relief. Countries eligible for HIPC relief but not yet meeting the necessary conditions.

The heavily indebted poor countries (HIPC) are a group of 39 developing countries with high levels of poverty and debt overhang. Because of these factors, the International Monetary Fund (IMF) and the World Bank have classified them as eligible for special assistance.

The HIPC Initiative was initiated by the International Monetary Fund and the World Bank in 1996, following extensive lobbying by NGOs and other bodies. It provides debt relief and low-interest loans to cancel or reduce external debt repayments to sustainable levels. This means the nations can repay debts in a timely fashion in the future. To be considered for the initiative, countries must face an unsustainable debt burden that cannot be managed with traditional means. Assistance is conditional on the national governments of these countries meeting a range of economic management and performance targets and undertaking economic and social reforms.

== Countries ==
The 37 countries that have so far received full or partial debt relief are:

- Afghanistan
- Benin
- Bolivia
- Burkina Faso
- Burundi
- Cameroon
- Central African Republic
- Chad
- Republic of the Congo
- Democratic Republic of the Congo
- Comoros
- Ivory Coast
- Ethiopia
- Gambia
- Ghana
- Guinea
- Guinea-Bissau
- Guyana
- Haiti
- Honduras
- Liberia
- Madagascar
- Mali
- Malawi
- Mauritania
- Mozambique
- Nicaragua
- Niger
- Rwanda
- São Tomé and Príncipe
- Senegal
- Sierra Leone
- Somalia
- Tanzania
- Togo
- Uganda
- Zambia

37 countries have completed the program and had their external debt cancelled in full, after Somalia passed the Completion Point in 2020.

An additional two countries (Eritrea and Sudan) are being considered for entry into the program as of March 2020. At its meeting on 28 June 2021, the IMF's executive board approved a financing plan to help mobilize resources needed for the fund to cover its share of debt relief to Sudan. This occurred after Sudan's civilian-led transitional government and its cabinet led by Abdalla Hamdok implemented tough economic reforms to reach the decision point.

== Requirements ==
To receive debt relief under HIPC, a country must first meet HIPC's threshold requirements. At HIPC's inception in 1996, the primary threshold requirement was that the country's debt remains at unsustainable levels despite full application of traditional, bilateral debt relief. At the time, HIPC considered debt unsustainable when the ratio of debt-to-exports exceeded 200-250% or when the ratio of debt-to-government revenues exceeded 280%.

== Funding ==
The IMF estimates that the total cost of providing debt relief to the 40 countries currently eligible for the HIPC program would be around $71 billion (in 2007 dollars). Half of the funding is provided by the IMF, World Bank, and other multilateral organizations, while the other half is provided by the creditor countries. The IMF's share of the cost is currently being funded by the proceeds of gold sales by the organization in 1999, but it estimated that this will not be enough to cover the full cost, and further funding will need to be raised if additional countries such as Sudan and Somalia meet the qualification requirements for entry into the program.

== Criticism ==
Critics soon began to attack HIPC's scope and its structure. First, they criticized HIPC's definition of debt sustainability, arguing that the debt-to-export and debt-to-government-revenues criteria were arbitrary and too restrictive. As evidence, critics highlighted that, by 1999, only four countries had received any debt relief under HIPC. Second, the six-year program was too long and too inflexible to meet the individual needs of debtor nations. Third, the IMF and the World Bank did not cancel any debt until the completion point, leaving countries under the burden of their debt payments while they struggled to institute structural reforms. Fourth, the ESAF conditions often undermined poverty-reduction efforts. For example, privatization of utilities tended to raise the cost of services beyond the citizens' ability to pay. Finally, critics attacked HIPC as a program designed by creditors to protect creditor interests, leaving countries with unsustainable debt burdens even upon reaching the decision point.

Inadequate debt relief for such countries means that they will need to spend more on servicing debts, rather than on actively investing in programs that can reduce poverty.

In 2008, some analysts showed that the HIPC initiative had failed, and failed miserably. One aspect behind the failure, according to the Nigerien journalist Moussa Tchangari:

The criteria used for country selection excluded the mostly highly populated developing countries (for example, Nigeria — 120 million inhabitants — which was on the very first list in 1996) and kept only small countries that are both very poor and heavily indebted... The countries where the majority of the world's poor people live are not included: China, India, Indonesia, Brazil, Argentina, Mexico, the Philippines, Pakistan, Nigeria, and the like. In fact, the initiative concerns only 11 percent of the total population of developing countries... It must be noted "that to benefit from the HIPC initiative, the countries concerned had to be free of arrears to the IMF and the World Bank. Countries applying for the HIPC initiative must adopt a Poverty Reduction Strategy Paper (PRSP), under the auspices of the IMF and the World Bank. This document must indicate the use that will be made of the resources made available by this initiative, and contain a certain number of commitments relating to the implementation of classical structural adjustment measures: privatization of public companies, reduction of the salaried workforce, reduction of grants, elimination of government subsidies and deregulation of the labour market. In other words, the whole arsenal of ultra-liberal measures which have contributed to the impoverishment of African populations, to the degradation of social services, to fall in life expectancy of over seven years, to the return of diseases we had thought eradicated, to increased unemployment for young graduates, to setting back industrialisation, and to the creation of chronic food shortages.

=== Responses to criticism ===
HIPC addressed its shortcomings by expanding its definition of unsustainable debts, making greater relief available to more countries, and by making relief available sooner.

Since 1996, the IMF has modified HIPC in several ways, often in response to the shortcomings its critics have highlighted. The IMF first restructured HIPC in 1999. These revisions modified HIPC's threshold requirements. Today, HIPC defines three minimum requirements for participation in the program. First, as before, a country must show its debt is unsustainable; however, the targets for determining sustainability decreased to a debt-to-export ratio of 150% and a debt-to-government-revenues ratio of 250%. Second, the country must be sufficiently poor to qualify for loans from the World Bank's International Development Association or the IMF's Poverty Reduction and Growth Facility (PRGF, the successor to ESAF), which provide long-term, interest-free loans to the world's poorest nations. Lastly, the country must establish a track record of reforms to help prevent future debt crises.

In addition to the modified threshold requirements, the 1999 revisions introduced several other changes. First, the six-year structure was abandoned and replaced by a "floating completion point" that allows countries to progress towards completion in less than six years. Second, the revised HIPC allows for interim debt relief so that countries begin to see partial relief before reaching the completion point. Third, the PRGF heavily modified ESAF by curtailing the number and detail of IMF conditions and by encouraging greater input from the local community into the program's design.

One of PRGF's goals is to ensure that impoverished nations re-channel the government funds freed from debt repayment into poverty-reduction programs. To that end, each country's PRGF program is modeled around a Poverty Reduction Strategy Paper (PRSP). PRSPs describe the macroeconomic, structural, and social programs that a country will follow to promote economic growth and reduce poverty. A broad range of government, NGO, and civil-society groups must participate in the development of the PRSP to ensure the plan has local support. Under the revised HIPC, a country reaches the decision point once it has demonstrated progress in following its PRSP. The country then reaches its completion point once it has implemented and followed its PRSP for at least one year and has demonstrated macroeconomic stability.

In 2001, the IMF introduced another tool to increase HIPC's effectiveness. Under the new practice of "topping up," countries that unexpectedly suffer economic setbacks after the decision point due to external factors, such as rising interest rates or falling commodity prices, are eligible for increased debt forgiveness above the decision-point level.

Further progress towards debt relief was announced on December 21, 2005, when the IMF granted preliminary approval to an initial debt relief measure of US$3.3 billion for 19 of the world's poorest countries, with the World Bank expected to write off the larger debts owed to it by 17 HIPCs in mid-2006."

As of December 2006, twenty-one countries have reached the HIPC completion point. Nine additional countries have passed the decision point and are working toward completion. Ten other countries carry unsustainable debts according to HIPC standards, but they have yet to reach the decision point. So far, the IMF and World Bank have approved $35 billion of HIPC debt relief. Five countries have received an additional $1.6 billion in "topping up" assistance since 2001.

== See also ==
- Central Emergency Response Fund – humanitarian fund by UNGA
- Debt-to-GDP ratio
- List of countries by percentage of population living in poverty
- Multilateral Debt Relief Initiative (MDRI)
- Millennium Development Goals
- Odious debt
- Government debt
