= Jubilee 2000 =

International movement to cancel third world debt by the year 2000

Logo of Jubilee 2000

Jubilee 2000 was an international coalition movement in over 40 countries that called for cancellation of third world debt by the year 2000. This movement coincided with the Great Jubilee, the celebration of the year 2000 in the Catholic Church. The campaign has been generally hailed as successful. As planned, the Jubilee 2000 Coalition dissolved at the end of the millennium year but left a legacy of organisations around the world.

== Concept ==
The concept derived from the biblical idea of the year of Jubilee, the 50th year. In the Jubilee Year as quoted in Leviticus, those enslaved because of debts are freed, lands lost because of debt are returned, and community torn by inequality is restored. It aimed to wipe out $90 billion of debt owed by the world's poorest nations, reducing the total to about $37 billion.

The idea was first articulated by the activist Paul Vallely in his 1990 book Bad Samaritans – First World Ethics and Third World Debt, and taken up by Martin Dent, a retired lecturer in politics at the University of Keele, who with his friend, retired diplomat William Peters, linked the biblical Jubilee to a modern debt relief programme and founded the Jubilee 2000 campaign in the early 1990s.

== Early activism ==
The activities were initially directed through church channels, and youth groups, in particular, became heavily involved. Campaigns were launched via a secretariat in the United Kingdom, franchising the "trademark" to any who directed campaign in the spirit of Jubilee 2000. The Church of England supported the movement; then-Archbishop of Canterbury George Carey addressed a rally in Trafalgar Square with Dent and Peters, and also made Jubilee 2000 the subject of his New Year's Day address on BBC 1.

Several of the UK ministers in charge of the relevant government departments after Labour came to power in 1997 were Scots. These included Gordon Brown and Alistair Darling in the Treasury, and Robin Cook as Foreign Secretary, all of whom would support the initiative. Jubilee 2000 Scottish Coalition attracted widespread support from Trade Unions, charities and different church denominations working together, and held events across Scotland. A feature of the campaign was that local groups were active in letter-writing, advocacy and education on international debt issues across the whole of the UK.

Perhaps the best known part of the movement was the global campaign created to engage the music and entertainment industries called Drop The Debt. Among the supporters were Bono of rock band U2, Quincy Jones, Willie Colón, Muhammad Ali, Bob Geldof, Youssou N'dour, Thom Yorke, N.T. Wright and others.

Jubilee 2000 staged demonstrations at the 1998 G8 meeting in Birmingham, England. At the Birmingham meeting, which, among other things, focused on achieving sustainable economic growth in the context of environmental protection and good governance, between 50,000 and 70,000 demonstrators participated in a peaceful protest in an effort to put debt relief on the agenda of Western governments. The protestors made headlines around the world for their activities aimed at increasing awareness, such as forming a human chain around Birmingham City Centre, passing out petitions, and holding workshops.

== Impact on debt policy ==
The protests caught the attention of Prime Minister Tony Blair and Chancellor of the Exchequer Gordon Brown, who met with the directors of Jubilee 2000 to discuss the issue of heavy debt in poor countries. Subsequently, the Prime Minister publicly expressed his personal support for, and dedication to, debt forgiveness. While the UK's move to cancel significant third world debt was also influenced by the millennium development goals, Gordon Brown's decision to support debt cancellation at a Jubilee 2000 rally at St Paul's Cathedral underlies the significance of the movement in influencing UK policy.

Later, a promise from the United States during the G-7 (G-8 financial ministers, excluding Russia) meeting in Cologne, Germany in 1999 to cancel 100% of the debt that qualifying countries owed the US was attributed in part to the influence of the campaign. Jubilee later lobbied the United States Congress to make good on this promise. Congress responded to the growing pressure to address debt relief issues in 2000 by committing $769 million to bilateral and multilateral debt relief.

== Post-Jubilee 2000 ==
From early 2001, Jubilee 2000 split into an array of organisations around the world; Jubilee South (encompassing many former Jubilee campaigns in Africa, Asia and Latin America); Jubilee Debt Campaign, Jubilee Scotland and Jubilee Research (hosted by the New Economics Foundation) in the UK; Jubilee USA Network; Jubilé 2000/CAD Mali in Mali; and many other national organisations. These co-ordinate their actions through a loose global confederation.

Jubilee USA, located in Washington, D.C., is the U.S.'s successor to Jubilee 2000. Erlassjahr.de is the German branch. There are also other organisations around the world which also carry forward the debt campaign.

Former Jubilee 2000 UK staff founded the short-lived Drop The Debt to work in the run-up to the 2001 G8 Summit in Genoa, maintaining Jubilee 2000's combination of lobbying, celebrity work and mass activism. Jubilee Research at the New Economics Foundation, located in London, took over from Jubilee 2000 in 2001 and now provides in-depth analysis and data on third world debt. Jubilee Debt Campaign is the UK's campaigning successor to Jubilee 2000, comprising much of the UK's original Jubilee 2000 membership, while Jubilee Scotland campaigns north of the border. The campaign calls for cancellation of debts owed by the world's poorest countries.

Debt was one of the targets of 2005's Make Poverty History Campaign.

In England and Wales, CAFOD's Jubilee 2025 campaign sees itself as building on the success of the 2000 campaign.

== Appraisals ==
Although it did not meet all of its stated goals, which were hugely ambitious, the campaign did receive very positive assessments for its grassroots involvement, vision, and measurable impacts on policy and poverty. Jonathan Glennie called it "one of the most important global movements for justice of our time". Then-UN Secretary General Kofi Annan wrote "Many events in the past few years have shown how powerful and influential NGOs can be ... We saw it with the campaign to ban landmines. We saw it with the coalition for the International Criminal Court. Perhaps most impressively of all, we saw it with the Jubilee 2000 campaign for debt relief." Archbishop Justin Welby described it as "perhaps the churches' finest hour in dethroning Mammon ... Sustained support from Christians and others across the world led to the cancellation of more than $100 billion of debt owed by 35 of the poorest countries."

Scholars have described the campaign as contributing to "a wider context of international demands for global justice" going on around the same time (for example, at the World Conference Against Racism). As part of an academic study, one campaign participant described it as having "much tied and linked to the reparations demand that many of us were making at that particular point in time."
