= Debt relief =

Partial or total forgiveness of debt

Debt relief or debt cancellation or debt jubilee is the partial or total forgiveness of debt, or the slowing or stopping of debt growth, owed by individuals, corporations, or nations.

From antiquity through the 19th century, it refers to domestic debts, in particular agricultural debts and freeing of debt slaves. In World War I the United States Treasury made large loans to the Allies that were postponed, reduced and finally paid off in 1953. In the late 20th century, it came to refer primarily to Third World debt, which started exploding with the Latin American debt crisis (Mexico 1983, etc.). In the early 21st century, it is of increased applicability to individuals in developed countries, due to credit bubbles and housing bubbles.

== International debt relief ==
=== First World War reparations ===
War debt payments by World War I Allies to the U.S. had been suspended in 1931—only Finland paid in full—and American public opinion demanded repayments resume as a condition of U.S. postwar aid. Germany had suspended its reparations payments due under the 1919 Versailles Treaty and payable to Britain, France and others, as well as loans due to the United States. Chancellor Konrad Adenauer decided that permanent good will required their resumption. The 1953 Agreement on German External Debts, which resumed German's war reparations, is a notable example of international debt relief.

=== Less developed country debt ===
Debt relief for heavily indebted and underdeveloped developing countries was the subject in the 1990s of a campaign by a broad coalition of development NGOs, Christian organizations and others, under the banner of Jubilee 2000. This campaign, involving, for example, demonstrations at the 1998 G8 meeting in Birmingham, was successful in pushing debt relief onto the agenda of Western governments and international organizations such as the International Monetary Fund and World Bank. The Heavily Indebted Poor Countries (HIPC) initiative was ultimately launched to provide systematic debt relief for the poorest countries, whilst trying to ensure the money would be spent on poverty reduction.

The HIPC programme has been subject to conditionalities similar to those often attached to International Monetary Fund (IMF) and World Bank loans, requiring structural adjustment reforms, sometimes including the privatisation of public utilities, including water and electricity. To qualify for irrevocable debt relief, countries must also maintain macroeconomic stability and implement a Poverty Reduction Strategy satisfactorily for at least one year. Under the goal of reducing inflation, some countries have been pressured to reduce spending in the health and education sectors. While the World Bank considers the HIPC Initiative a success, some scholars are more critical of it.

The Multilateral Debt Relief Initiative (MDRI) is an extension of HIPC. The MDRI was agreed following the G8's Gleneagles meeting in July 2005. It offers 100% cancellation of multilateral debts owed by HIPC countries to the World Bank, IMF and African Development Bank.

One of the targets of the UN Sustainable Development Goals, specifically Goal 17, is to "assist developing countries in attaining long-term debt sustainability through coordinated policies aimed at fostering debt financing, debt relief and debt restructuring". This will help poor countries "reduce debt distress".

== Personal debt relief ==
=== Origins ===
Debt relief existed in a number of ancient societies:

- Debt forgiveness is mentioned in the Book of Leviticus (a Judaeo-Christian scripture), in which God counsels Moses to forgive debts in certain cases every Jubilee year – at the end of Shmita, the last year of the seven-year agricultural cycle or a 49-year cycle, depending on interpretation.
- This same theme was found in an ancient bilingual Hittite-Hurrian text entitled "The Song of Debt Release".
- Debt forgiveness was also found in Ancient Athens, where in the 6th century BCE, the lawmaker Solon instituted a set of laws called seisachtheia, which canceled all debts and retroactively canceled previous debts that had caused slavery and serfdom, freeing debt slaves and debt serfs.
- In addition, the Qur'an (the Muslim scripture) supports debt forgiveness for those who are unable to pay as an act of charity and remission of sins for the creditor. The injunction is as follows:

If the debtor is in difficulty, grant him time till it is easy for him to repay. But, if ye remit it by way of charity, that is best for you if ye only knew.

— Qur'an 2:280

In the United States, the first serious movements to create debt relief were rooted in debtor farmer grievances against creditors. In the early 19th century, legislators created pathways for indebted farmers to take creditors to court to erase what they owed and enable them to start over. The first federal bankruptcy law, passed in 1841 and repealed in 1843, was re-introduced and expanded in 1867. At the time, this was a comparatively radical approach to debt relief in the world, making the United States one of the most debtor-friendly countries.

=== Contemporary ===
In the United States of America for the years preceding the 2008 financial crisis, non-housing personal debt (auto loans, credit cards, student loans, etc.) rose significantly from approximately $2.05 trillion at the start of 2003 to a peak of $2.71 trillion in Q4 of 2008. It was not until Q3 of 2012 that unsecured personal debt reached this level again. Since that time, unsecured personal debt has risen steadily to $3.76 trillion at the end of the third quarter of 2017. The other large change in unsecured personal debt is that an increasing portion of it is now student loan debt, from 12% in Q1 of 2003 to 53% in Q3 of 2017.

The increasing size of the non-housing personal debt market and ease with which one can obtain personal credit has led to some consumers falling behind on payments. As of Q3 2017, student loans have the highest rates of serious delinquency (90 or more days delinquent) with approximately 9.6% of all student loan debt falling into this bucket. Credit card debt and auto loan debt have serious delinquency rates of 4.6% and 2.4% respectively.

When consumers begin to fall behind on payments, they have several options to discharge the debt, either in full or in part. The first method is declaring bankruptcy, which has the immediate effect of stopping any payments made to creditors. In the United States, the two primary avenues of bankruptcy for an individual are Chapter 13 bankruptcy and Chapter 7 bankruptcy. Another option is to consolidate these debts into a single loan, commonly known as debt consolidation. Debt relief, on an individual level, refers mainly to the negotiation for a reduction of a debt by either the consumer or a debt settlement agency. Through this arrangement, consumers agree to pay the creditor a fixed amount of money (generally a discount on their outstanding debt) either in a lump sum or under a payment plan. The debt settlement industry has had significant regulatory scrutiny since its inception with changes implemented in 2010 by the FTC. As the disposition of personal debt is a highly regulated industry, consumers are urged by the FTC and other trade organizations to do significant research and find an independent credit counselor to guide them through the process.

In 2019, the Texas Legislature forgave an estimated $2.5 billion in debt when it abolished its "Driver Responsibility Surcharge" in all but driving while intoxicated (DWI) cases. This surcharge was an extra three-year civil penalty added onto certain criminal traffic infractions like DWI or driving without a license or insurance. Surcharges were created in 2003 to pay for a roadway network that was never built, and instead half the money was diverted to hospitals, which became reliant on the money, with the rest going into the state treasury. However, the majority of drivers who had surcharges assessed could not pay them. Many people who could not afford either surcharges or insurance continued to drive and racked up huge sums in debt they could never expect to pay. A little-advertised amnesty program and an indigence program that still required partial payment helped some, and were criticized by some who felt it was unfair that they paid and others didn't. But local sheriffs began to complain that the law was causing the jails to fill up with people driving on suspended license, and the judiciary insisted the law was unfair and counterproductive to public safety. Finally, in 2019, the Legislature found different sources to fund hospitals and eliminated the surcharge, along with around $2.5 billion in debt owed by around 1.4 million people. The same year, the Legislature eliminated red-light cameras statewide and effectively canceled those debts, and re-defined "undue hardship" in the Code of Criminal Procedure to allow judges to waive traffic-fine debt for more people.

==== Tax treatment ====
In US tax law, debt forgiven is treated as income, as it reduces a liability, increasing the taxpayer's net worth. In the context of the bursting of the United States housing bubble, the Mortgage Forgiveness Debt Relief Act of 2007 provides that debt forgiven on a primary residence is not treated as income, for debts forgiven in the three-year period 2007–2009. The Emergency Economic Stabilization Act of 2008 extended this by three years to the six-year period 2007–2012.

== Bankruptcy and non-recourse loans ==
The primary mechanism of debt relief in modern societies is bankruptcy, where a debtor who cannot or chooses not to pay their debts files for bankruptcy and renegotiates their debts, or a creditor initiates this. As part of debt restructuring, the terms of the debt are modified, which may involve the debt owed being reduced. In case the debtor chooses bankruptcy despite being able to service the debt, this is called strategic bankruptcy.

Certain debts can be defaulted on without a general bankruptcy; these are non-recourse loans, most notably mortgages in common law jurisdictions such as the United States. Choosing to default on such a loan despite being able to service it is called strategic default.

== Alternatives ==
=== Historical ===
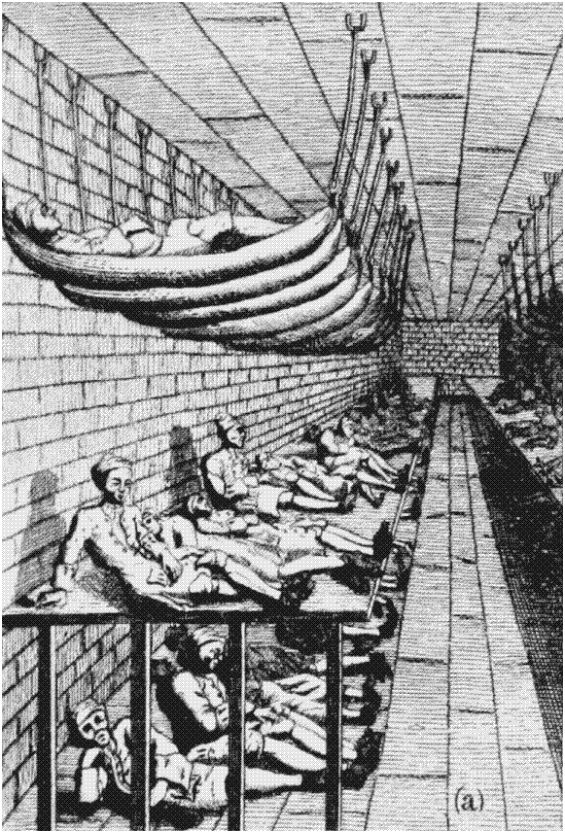
The sick men's ward at Marshalsea debtors' prison

If a debt cannot be or is not repaid, alternatives that were common historically but are now rare include debt bondage—including debt peonage: being bound until the debt is repaid; and debt slavery, when the debt is so great (or labor valued so low) that the debt will never be repaid—and debtors' prison.

Debt slavery can persist across generations, future generations being made to work to pay off debts incurred by past generations. Debt bondage is today considered a form of "modern day slavery" in international law, and banned as such, in Article 1(a) of the United Nations 1956 Supplementary Convention on the Abolition of Slavery. Nevertheless, the practice continues in some nations. In most developed nations, debts cannot be inherited.

Debtors' prison has been largely abolished, but remains in some forms in the US, for example if one fails to make child support payments.

=== Contemporary ===
In modern times, the most common alternatives to debt relief in cases where debt cannot be paid are forbearance and debt restructuring. Forbearance meaning that interest payments (possibly including past due ones) are forgiven, so long as payments resume. No reduction of principal occurs, however.

In debt restructuring, an existing debt is replaced with a new debt. This may result in reduction of the principal (debt relief), or may simply change the terms of repayment, for instance by extending the term (replacing a debt repaid over 5 years with one repaid over 10 years), which allows the same principal to be amortized over a longer period, thus allowing smaller payments.

Personal debt that can be repaid from income but is not being repaid may be obtained via garnishment or attachment of earnings, which deduct debt service from wages.

== Inflation ==
Inflation, the reduction in the nominal value of currency, reduces the real value of debts. While lenders take inflation into account when they decide the terms of a loan, unexpected increases in the rate of inflation cause categorical debt relief.

Inflation has been a contentious political issue on this basis, with debasement of currency a form of or alternative to sovereign default, and the free silver in late 19th century America being seen as a conflict between debtor farmers and creditor bankers.

== Impact ==
A 2024 study found that debt relief for debtors leads to a large increase in earned income, employment, assets, real estate, secured debt, home ownership, and wealth over subsequent decades.

Another 2024 study found that debtors who receive debt relief are more likely to support incumbent governments.

A 2025 study of medical debt relief found no evidence that it led to improvements in mental and physical health, healthcare utilization, and financial wellness. It did however find that it led moderate but statistically significant reduction in payments of existing medical bills.

== In art ==
Debt relief plays a significant role in some artworks. In the play The Merchant of Venice by William Shakespeare, c. 1598, the heroine pleads for debt relief (forgiveness) on grounds of Christian mercy. In the 1900 novel The Wonderful Wizard of Oz, a primary political interpretation is that it treats free silver, which engenders inflation and hence reduces debts. In the 1999 film Fight Club (but not the novel on which it is based), the climactic event is the destruction of credit card records, dramatized as the destruction of skyscrapers, which allows for debt relief. The television series Mr. Robot (2015–2019), follows a group of hackers whose main mission is to cancel all debts by taking down one of the largest corporations in the world, E Corp.

== See also ==
- Anti-globalization movement
- Eurodad
- Heavily indebted poor countries (HIPC)
- International development
- Jubilee USA Network
- Loan waiver
- Loan modification in the United States
- Multilateral Debt Relief Initiative (MDRI)
- Odious debt
- Survie, activist group against Third World debt
