= Alcolea (disambiguation) =

Alcolea is a municipality in the province of Almería, Andalusia, Spain.

Alcolea may also refer to:

== Places ==
- Alcolea de Cinca, a municipality in the province of Huesca, Aragon, Spain
- Alcolea del Río, a municipality in the province of Seville, Andalusia, Spain
- Alcolea del Pinar, a municipality in the province of Guadalajara, Castile-La Mancha, Spain
- Alcolea de las Peñas, a municipality in the province of Guadalajara, Castile-La Mancha, Spain
- Alcolea de Tajo, a municipality in the province of Toledo, Castile-La Mancha, Spain
- Alcolea de Calatrava, a municipality in the province of Ciudad Real, Castile-La Mancha, Spain
- Alcolea, Córdoba, a town in Córdoba municipal term, Andalusia, Spain, where two important battles took place
  - Battle of Alcolea (1808)
  - Battle of Alcolea (1868)
- Vilanova d'Alcolea, a municipality in the province of Castelló, Valencian Community, Spain
- La Pobla d'Alcolea, a village in the Morella municipal term, Ports, Spain

== People with the surname ==
- Arnold Alcolea (born 1982), Cuban cyclist
- Pablo Alcolea (born 1989), Spanish footballer
