= Ange René Armand, baron de Mackau =

French naval officer and politician

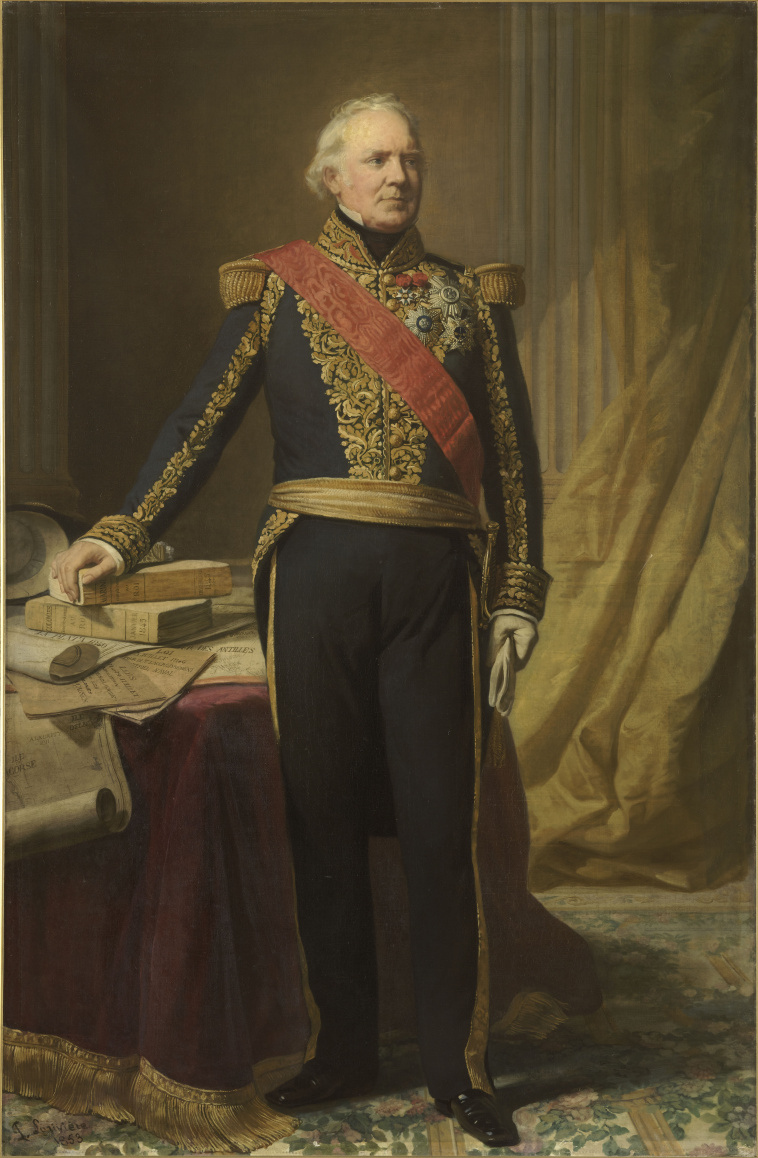
- Portrait of Ange de Mackau
- Born: 17 February 1788; Paris
- Died: 13 May 1855 (aged 67); Paris
- Military career
- Allegiance: France
- Branch: French Navy
- Rank: Admiral
- Conflicts: Capture of HMS Alacrity
- Awards: Grand cross of the Legion of Honour; Pair de France
- Other work: Deputy of Morbihan; Minister of the Navy and of Colonies; Governor of Martinique

Ange René Armand, Baron de Mackau (17 February 1788 – 13 May 1855) was a French naval officer and politician. In 1825, he led 14 brigs of war to Haiti in one of the earliest instances of gunboat diplomacy, forcing the recently emancipated people of Haiti to pay 150 million francs to their former enslavers. The Mackau Law that he later instigated as Minister of the Navy and of Colonies paved the way for the abolition of slavery.

== Life ==
=== Early history ===
Descendant of an ancient family of Ireland who followed King James II to France and grandson of the deputy governess of the sisters of Louis XVI, Ange de Mackau was raised in the same institution as Jérôme Bonaparte, Napoleon's youngest brother, and entered the navy as a novice at 17.

=== During the Napoleonic Era ===
On the orders of Prince Jérôme, he embarked on the ship-of-the-line Vétéran. Upon his return from its campaign in the Atlantic and the Caribbean in 1808, his conduct and excellent exam scores earned him the rank of Aspirant, 1st class. He was then called to command a station of the French coast guard, where he acquitted himself honorably in engagements with a British cruiser.

He subsequently made a long cruise on the frigate Hortense, commanded by Captain Baudin. When Baudin was promoted to contre-amiral, he attached Ange de Mackau as his deputy-adjunct in the Mediterranean squadron and kept him nearby until 1810.

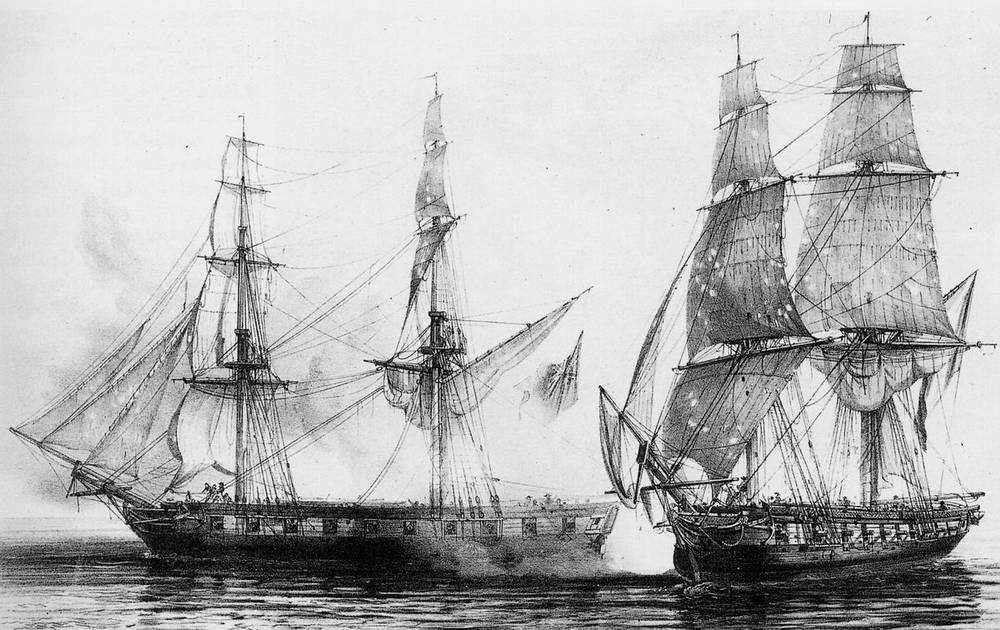
The brig Abeille capturing HMS Alacrity on 26 May 1811

At that time, Mackau went as first lieutenant on the brig Abeille. On 26 May 1811, returning from a mission to Corsica, Abeille encountered HMS Alacrity off Bastia and attacked the larger brig without hesitation. After having seen all its officers lost in combat, fifteen crewmen killed, and twenty others wounded, Alacrity surrendered and was dragged in triumph to Bastia. For this success, Mackau was promoted to ship-of-the-line lieutenant, made a knight of the Legion of Honor, and granted command of the captured ship.

After several other battles and the capture of several merchant vessels, Mackau was named in 1812 as a frigate captain at age 24. He received command of the French squadron charged with protecting the Tuscan coast, where in December he participated in the defense of Livorno. The next year, he returned to Toulon with every ship-of-the-line in his squadron unharmed and a great quantity of supplies drawn from Livorno and Genoa.

=== During the Restoration ===
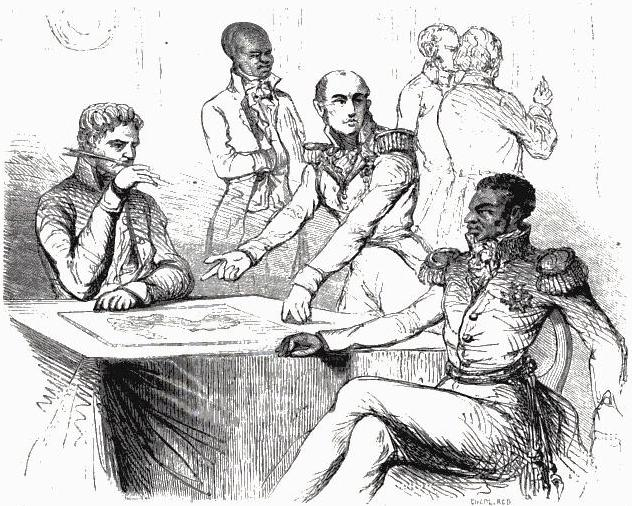
Mackau negotiating with Haitian president Jean-Pierre Boyer in 1825

Under the Restoration, which preserved his rank, he requested and obtained important missions to Île Bourbon and Madagascar, where he obtained and provided useful information. In 1816, he was named second-in-command for the frigate Eurydice, and in 1818 he received the command of Golo and campaigned in almost every sea in the world while participating in important hydrographic work.

Named ship-of-the-line captain on 1 September 1819, he was directed to Senegal, where the French government planned to found new settlements. After investigation, he decided to abandon this project and only maintain the existing ones. According to him, Senegal could only be a trading colony and not a farming one. During this mission, he also gathered information on the black slave trade.

On his return to France, he was named a gentleman of the chamber of King Louis XVIII. In June 1821, he then received command of Clorinde, a 58-gun frigate, which he sailed to the Pacific in order to conduct negotiations with the new states of Chile and Peru.

In command of Circé, he was next directed to Haiti in order for it to accept the "Ordinance of Emancipation" of 17 April 1825, which partially recognized the independence of the formerly French half of the island (while leaving Haiti's occupation of the formerly Spanish half unrecognized, and in the event withholding full diplomatic recognition for another decade) while ordering, in return, five annual payments of ₣30 million in cash from the impoverished nation, opening of the ports to trade from all nations, and a tariff rate for French goods half that of any other nation. The Haitians particularly objected to the exemption of the Spanish section from any obligation or recognition under the treaty, a stipulation which would lead to the Dominican War of Independence, but being met by the additional squadrons under Admirals Jurien de la Gravière and Grivel and threatening French reconquest of the nation, Mackau obtained confirmation of the order.

Named counter admiral on 1 September 1825, member of the Council of the Admiralty in 1828, and director of naval personnel on 17 September 1829, he participated in the preparation of the Algerian Expedition and displayed there a marked firmness of will and power.

=== During the July monarchy ===
President of the electoral college of Lorient, Admiral Mackau was elected deputy by the 2nd electoral arrondissement of Morbihan on 23 June 1830.

He took the oath to the July monarchy, renounced his position in personnel, and was named in 1831 as commander of the Squadron of the Downs, whose purview at the time included the war between the Netherlands and its rebellious southern provinces, which had declared independence as Belgium. This squadron transported the garrison of Antwerp from Dunkerque to Vlissingen and was charged with blockading the Dutch ports.

Returned to Cherbourg-en-Cotentin, Admiral Mackau was named commander of the Antilles station. On 3 August 1833 the French consul at Cartagena, Adolphe Barrot, was arrested and his official papers seized. After informing the government of New Granada of the reparations demanded by the French government and being rebuffed, Admiral Mackau prepared his force for action pending instructions from Paris. After nearly a year, he received orders permitting him the widest latitude and left Martinique with five vessels and the consul, arriving unexpected at Cartagena forcing the Boca Chica, and placing himself in a position to capture the forts guarding the sole entrance to the port. Reopening negotiations, he obtained complete reparations.

After having rendered to the navy other important services, the admiral was charged with the inspection of French fishing establishments at Saint-Pierre-et-Miquelon and the island of Newfoundland. He was barely returned to France when a rupture with the United States became imminent. Admiral Mackau was named commander in chief of the naval forces of the Antilles and governor of Martinique in order to take measures to protect French settlement and commerce in the Antilles and Atlantic, but the war was averted. In these functions, Mackau was preoccupied with the anti-slavery movement which arose and strove to improve the plight of the blacks.

Mackau left Martinique. On the way, the frigate Terpsichore, on which he travelled with all his family, was assailed by a terrible tempest and remained several days in distress off the coast of Ireland. In these grave circumstances, he assumed command of the frigate and assisted by her captain, officers, and crewmen, he managed to lead Terpischore into the port of Cork.

On 30 May 1837, he was named a Vice-Admiral and new member of the Council of the Admiralty.

In 1840, Admiral Mackau went at the head of 43 warships to make vigorous demonstrations in the Río de la Plata in order to conclude an agreement with Rosas, dictator of Argentina, which was completed 29 October.

Created a peer of France on 20 July 1842, he was commanding the Mediterranean squadron when he was called to head the Ministry of the Navy and Colonies on 24 July 1843 as a replacement for Admiral Albin Roussin. During his administration, he reorganized the departments of control and accountability; proposed the laws of 18 and 19 July 1845, called the Mackau Law, which made preparations for the abolishment of slavery throughout the French Empire; and also the law of 3 July 1846 opening a credit of ₣93 million for the improvement of the French Navy. He received the Grand Cross of the Legion of Honor on 29 October 1845.

Several trials called public attention to the abuses and disorder within the naval administration. Mackau tried unsuccessfully to fix them and was forced to accept an inquiry demanded by the Chamber of Deputies. Furthermore, the French Parliament considered the measures against slavery insufficient, and the deputies adopted the proposal of Alexandre Ledru-Rollin on the subject. Faced with a vote of no confidence, Mackau resigned on 8 May 1847. Nevertheless, he was promoted to full admiral on 23 December.

=== During the Second Republic and Empire ===
Avoiding the Second Republic, he became a senator during the Second Empire by right of his admiralty on 26 January 1852. He died three years later after having vainly sought a command in the Crimean War.

He was the father of Armand de Mackau (1832–1918), a deputy of the Third Republic.
