= Battle of Alcolea =

Alcolea, Andalusia, Spain was the site of several historical battles:

- Battle of Alcolea (1808)
- Battle of Alcolea (1868)
