= Joseph Romain-Desfossés =

French naval officer and politician

Joseph Romain-Desfossés Amiral de France
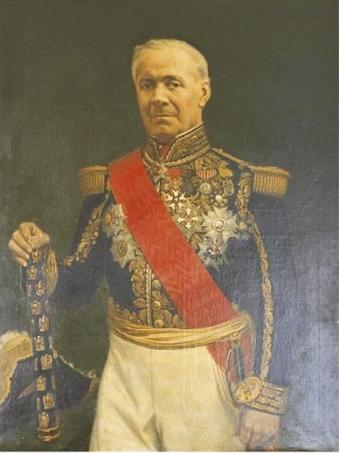
- 1864 portrait by Yan' Dargent
- Born: 8 December 1798; Gouesnou, Finistère, France
- Died: 25 October 1864 (aged 65); Paris, France
- Occupations: Naval officer, politician
- Years active: 1807- 1864
- Known for: Minister of the Navy and Colonies Battle of Veracruz

Joseph Romain-Desfossés (8 December 1798 – 25 October 1864) was a French naval officer and politician. He was appointed Minister of the Navy and Colonies on 31 October 1849.

== Life ==
=== Family and Childhood ===
Joseph Romain-Desfossés was born in Gouesnou, Finistère, on 8 December 1798. His grandfather was a French naval officer and his father started his career as a midshipman and ended it in the XIXe century as a Capitaine de Frégate.

Romain Desfossés married Hortense Desfossés, born as Hortense Guillou, a daughter of a merchant from Landerneau. They lived in Landerneau and later at Kérérault Manor in Plougastel-Daoulas.

=== Career in the French Navy ===
He joined the Cassard at the age of nine, becoming a midshipman second class.

At twelve years of age he joined the gunboat commanded by his father, a naval lieutenant, serving for several years. He became a sub-lieutenant in September 1819 and lieutenant in December 1828. He was attached to the staff of Admiral Jean-Baptiste Grivel, maritime prefect at Brest.

Romain-Desfossés was made captain of the corvette la Loire on 10 April 1837. He made a cruise in the Levant, as second captain of L'Iéna, and accompanied the Prince of Joinville in 1838 in the Bombardment of San Juan de Ulúa. Him and the Prince developed a friendship and the two stayed friends until their deaths.

Confirmed as captain on 31 July 1841 he was commander-in-chief of the Madagascar station from 1844 to 1847. He concluded an advantageous treaty with the Imam of Muscat and Oman, and made a naval demonstration against Madagascar. On his return to France, on 27 September 1847 he was appointed Commodore.

Romain-Desfossés was a Major General of the Navy in Brest when he was elected on 13 May 1849 to represent Finistère in the Legislative Assembly. He was among the majority. On 31 October 1849 he was appointed Minister of the Navy and Colonies by the President Louis Napoleon. When in post he voted an indemnification for slaves owners who were dispossessed. He voted for the island of Nuku Hiva as a place of deportation.

On 9 August 1850 he was made a Grand Officer of the Legion of Honour.

He left the ministry in January 1851 when Louis-Napoléon Bonaparte relieved General Changarnier of his functions of Commander of the National Guard. Desfosses then became commander of the Levant squadron.

He became vice-admiral on 11 June 1853, a member of the admiralty board and chairman of the naval works committee. On 20 March 1855 he was appointed senator.

In February 1858 Romain-Desfossés received Queen Victoria and Napoléon III at Cherbourg. During the Second Italian War of Independence in 1859 he commanded the squadron of the Mediterranean and the Adriatic. After this campaign he bombarded Tétouan in Morocco to avenge an insult to the flag. He was promoted to admiral on 9 July 1860. Joseph Romain-Desfossés died in Paris on 25 October 1864. He is buried in Landerneau.
