= Sailors of the Imperial Guard =

Naval unit of the French Imperial Guard

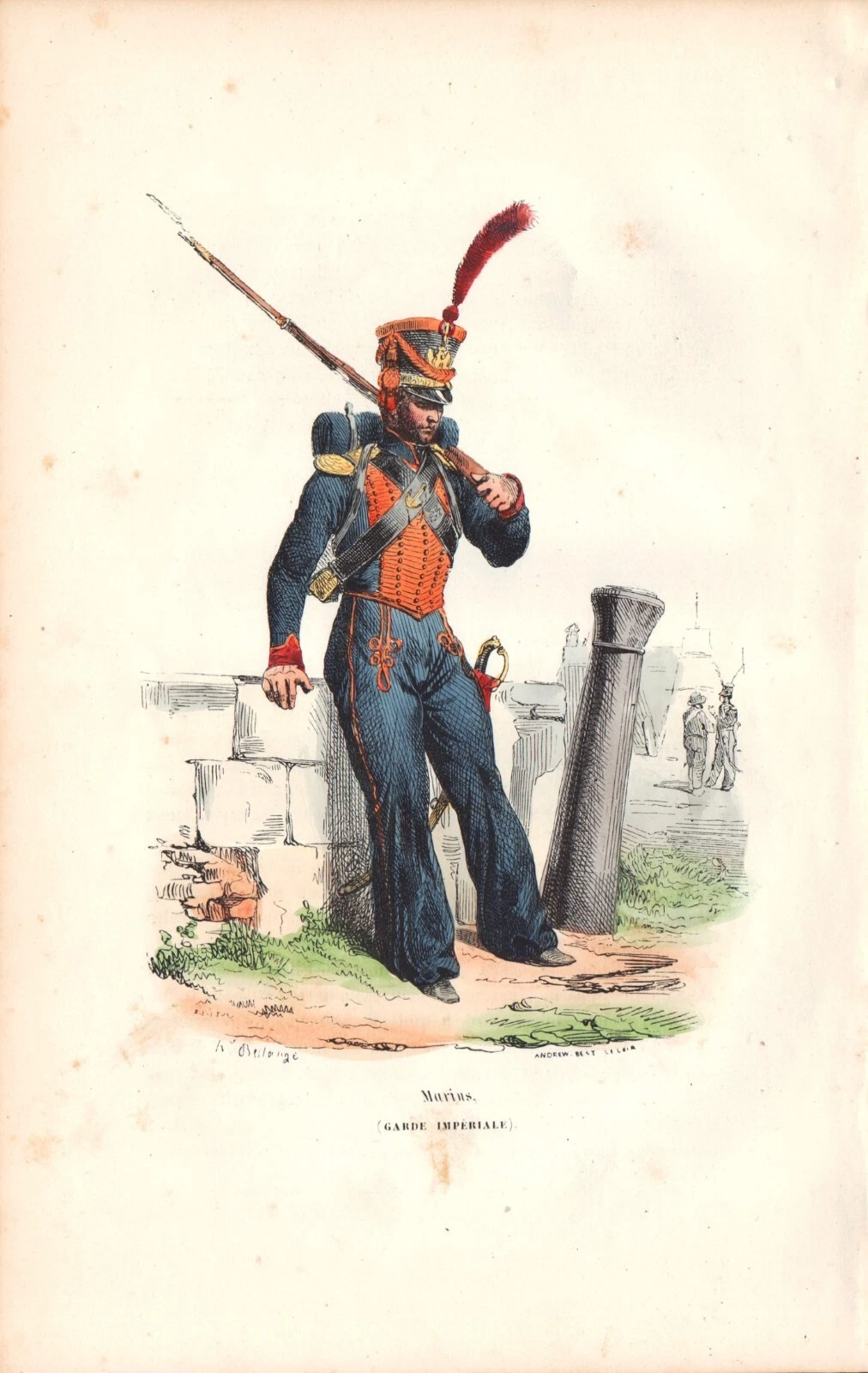
- A Sailor of the Guard in full dress
- Active: 27 September 1803–23 April 1814; 6 May 1815–10 August 1815
- Country: First French Empire
- Branch: (France) French Imperial Army
- Type: Naval Infantry, Artillery Support
- Size: Initially 5x Crews, later expanded to 8
- Part of: Consular Guard, Imperial Guard
- Engagements: Napoleonic Wars; Battle of Austerlitz; Battle of Jena-Aurstedt; Siege of Danzig; Siege of Stralsund; Dos de Mayo Uprising; Battle of Arcolea Bridge; Battle of Bailen; Battle of Barrosa; Battle of Borodino; Battle of Beresina; Battle of Lützen (1813); Battle of Leipzig; Battle of Champaubert; Battle of Arcis-sur-Aube; Battle of Waterloo

The Sailors of the Imperial Guard (French: Marins de la Garde impériale) were a naval unit within Napoleon's Imperial Guard. The unit's soldiers not only operated as naval infantry but as gunners (after the training they had received in naval gunnery), sailors and engineers. Napoleon himself stated, "They were good sailors, then they were the best soldiers. And they did everything - they were soldiers, gunners, sappers, everything!".

== History ==
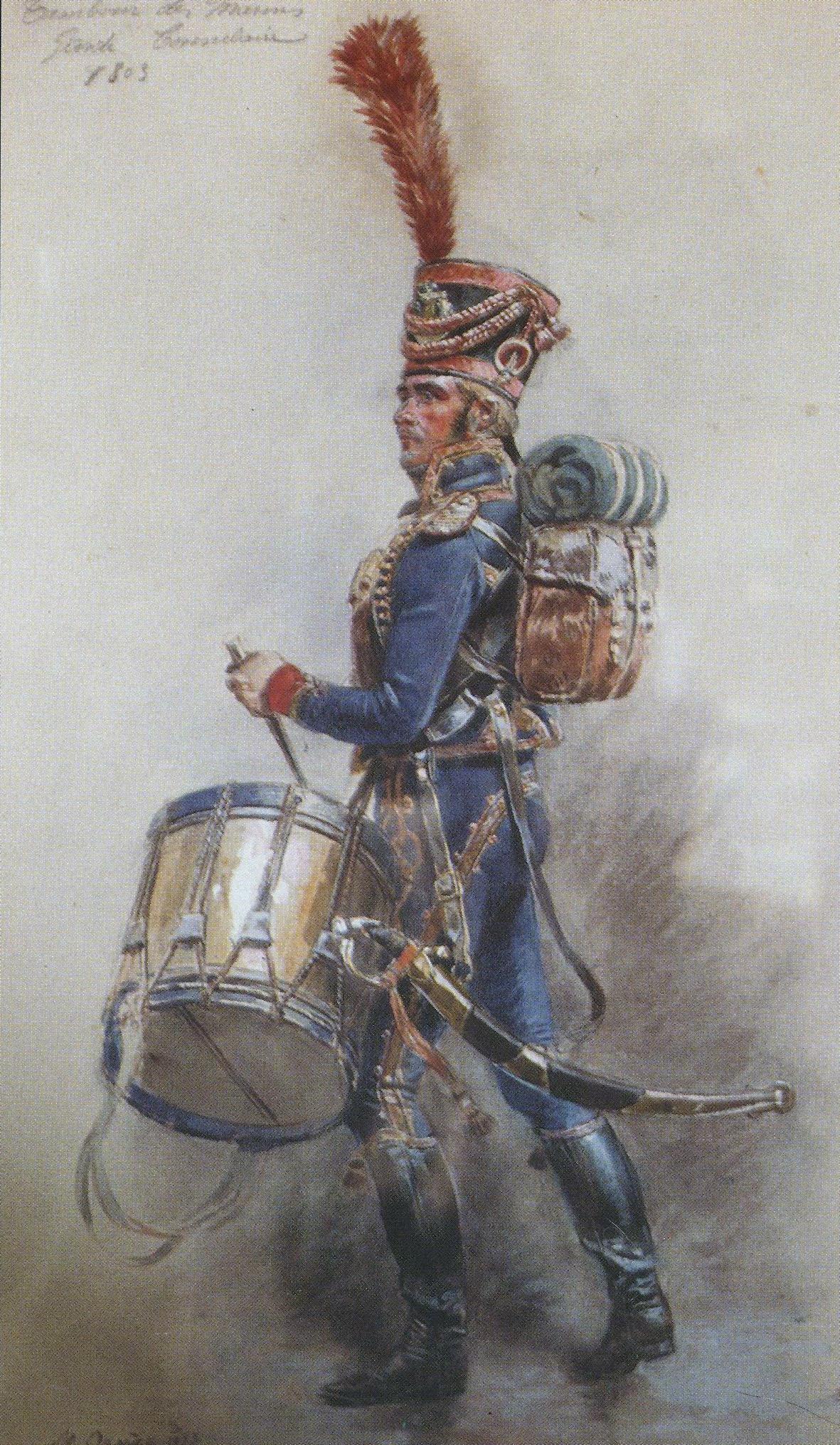
Illustration of a drummer of the Sailors of the Consular Guard by Maurice Orange

On 23 September 1803, First Consul Napoleon Bonaparte issued orders to raise a battalion of naval infantry known as the "Sailors of the Consular Guard", with recruitment for the new unit beginning four days later. Recruited primarily from Corsica and coastal areas of mainland France, the battalion was charged with operating landing craft for Napoleon's planned invasion of Britain. In 1804, Napoleon integrated the battalion, consisting of 737 officers and men divided into five crews, into the newly-formed Old Guard. The battalion was expanded to 818 men in the same year, and placed under the jurisdiction of the Ministry of the Navy; each crew was commanded by a ship-of-the-line captain or frigate captain and four other officers, under which served 15 non-commissioned officers and 125 enlisted personnel.

Pre-1805, the Marins De La Garde were armed 1/3 with sabres, 1/3 with boarding axes, and 1/3 with boarding pikes. Some iterations also claim they were armed with a pistol hung from a waist belt hook. By September 1805, boarding pikes and boarding axes would be replaced by a musket and sabre. The musket most likely being a Marine Musket: Model Year IX. By 1815 however, supply shortages would force many Guard Sailors to use the Charleville Carbine.

The new unit was initially stationed at the Camp of Boulogne along with the rest of Napoleon's invasion force. It participated in reconnaissance duties, coastal patrols, engineering works, rescue operations, and naval training. When the planned invasion was called off in 1805, the unit participated in the Ulm campaign, providing a reliable flow of rations and other military supplies to French troops. In 1806, 102 men from the unit took part in the Prussian campaign, maintaining a solid line of supplies, and providing their expertise in engineering works, to the soldiers in Jena. They secured rivers, built bridges, and dug earthworks for the Grande Armée preceding the Battle of Eylau and Friedland, ensuring order and steady logistics, vital in the eventual victory of the French army.

The unit participated in the 1807 siege of Danzig, where they formed part of François de Chasseloup-Laubat's force of engineers. During the siege, a crew of no more than 100 men took part in carrying supplies past the Royal Navy to deliver resources to other French troops besieging the city. A task done successfully. The remainder of the battalion arrived after the city fell to the French. They were then separated from the rest of the Old Guard, and sent to partake in the Siege of Stralsund. An affair that lasted through October, and had made them miss the November 25th Imperial Guard's return celebration in Paris.

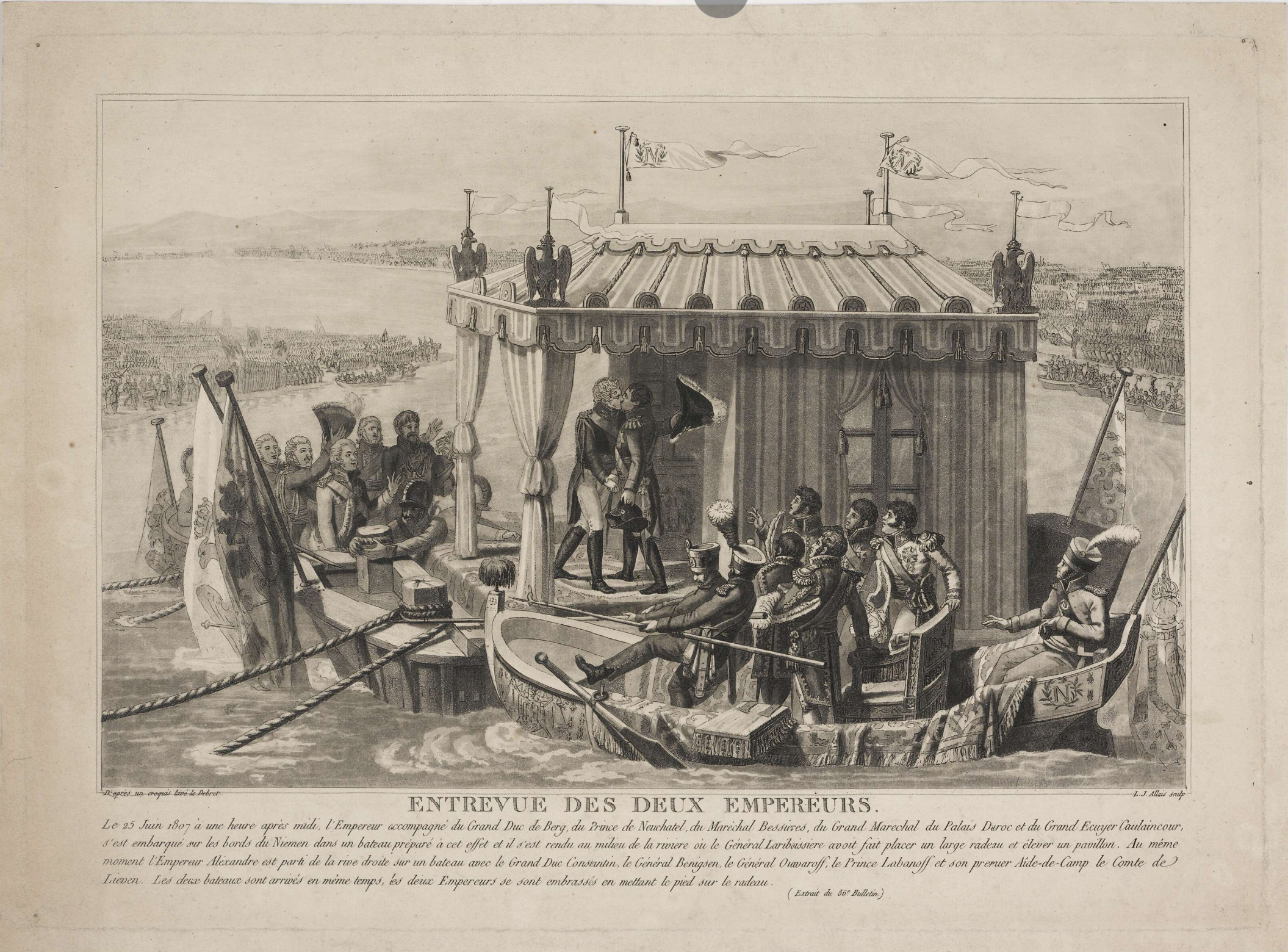
Napoleon I and Alexander I of Russia embrace in a kiss. Three Guard Sailors command his royal vessel.

At the Peace of Tilsit, the unit was made to man the boats that carried Napoleon in his famous union with Alexander I of Russia. The unit was sent back to France, and by March 15, 1808, Murat had commented to Napoleon that "Les Marins sont bien fatigués," (The Sailors are very tired). As of course they would have been; having taken part in continuous sieges and campaigns while much of the Old Guard had taken part in festivities and break.

=== Peninsular War ===
The unit left for Spain soon afterwards to fight in the Peninsular War. Under the orders of General Pierre Dupont de l'Étang, they were separated from the Imperial Guard again with orders to support the siege of Cádiz. They traveled with Dupont's conscripts and stood as the most veteran unit there. During their march to Cádiz, they saw their first line battle, supporting General Fresia's cavalry in the Battle of Alcolea Bridge. In the battle they charged the Spanish on the bridge and routed them. Securing the bridge and the villages near it from guerillas, they pushed onto Cordoba in a rough skirmish. They took no casualties in the process.

After proceeding past Cordoba, they served an active role in the Battle of Bailén. At first part of Dupont's reserve force, they eventually were allowed to partake in the French cannonade with devastating effect. After hours of failed charges and no progress towards victory, Dupont began to panic. As a last ditch attempt at victory, Dupont sent the Guard Sailors forward into the Spanish center in a desperate charge. Despite the unit breaking through the first and second Spanish lines, a lack of reinforcements led them to be quickly overwhelmed. By the time of surrender, a third of their force was dead. Dupont capitulated, with the terms of surrender allowing his army to be sent back to France without arms. However, the Seville Junta refused to honour the pact, and only Dupont and his staff officers were sent back to France. Most of Dupont's surrendered army were imprisoned in Cádiz on barges, where some remained until 1814. Conditions on these prison ships were hellish. 1,800 men at least were stuffed onto each ship, with rotting rations and no water, a majority of the prisoners would never see France again.

A result of these conditions had caused the Sailors to become adamant on escape:

In March 1809, as Commander Vattier of the Sailors of the Guard was being transferred to a prison ship named La Fortune, he made his escape with other officers of the Guard. Through a networks of vessels and aids, they soon arrived to safety.

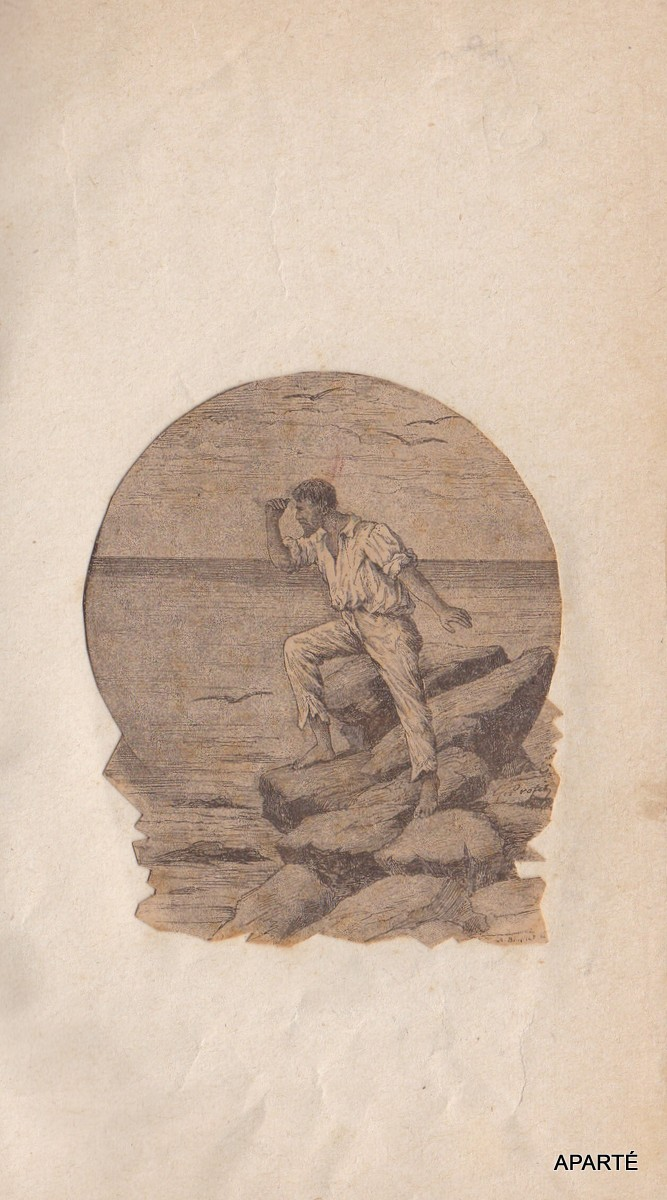
A ragged Guard Sailor POW looking out from the island of Cabrera as shown from Henri Ducor's memoirs

Fearing closing French ships would rescue those on the prison ships, many prisoners (an estimated 6,000) would be sent to the decrepit island of Cabrera. Among them 180 Sailors of the Guard. There they would be given nothing, expected to starve and die on the island. In fact, 2,000 would perish between May 9, 1809, and October 1, 1809. An instance exists of nine Guard Sailors who captured a Spanish gunboat in their escape:

The Spaniards decided to send us from time to time, with a bread boat, a second boat loaded with water. It came twice; on its third voyage, nine Sailors of the Guard spied upon it; as soon as the barrels were on land, at an agreed signal, they rushed together, and without leaving the Spaniards time to recognize the situation, they made themselves masters of the boat, in which they immediately moved away rapidly, to the sound of the acclamations of all the prisoners who made wishes that they could not be caught; and, indeed, the gunboats then under sail to the east of the island, not having been warned in time, did not catch them. Alas! counting from that day no more water came, and all our misfortunes began again.

— Henri Ducor: Adventures of a Sailor of the Imperial Guard

Cabrera would see the Sailors of the Guard attempt two more escapes, with the knowledge of leaving their comrades abandoned on the island. One attempt to escape by the Guard Sailors would lead to ten to be beat to death by Spaniard and Frenchmen alike, the other ten of the group having escaped. The second attempt would see two imprisoned, and all means of escape destroyed. Many Sailors of the Guard would also be transferred to English prisons. Despite the distance two Guard Sailor officers are noted to have stolen two small boats, and sail back to France in order to rejoin the Emperor's campaigns.

As for the fate of the rest of the men in Cabrera, by 1814, nearly 10,000 would be sent there. Even despite the terms of prisoner releases by Napoleon's abdication in 1814, 2000 would remain there. All of whom would die. Still yet, more escapes would occur for those trapped on the prison hulks harbored in Cadiz. With news that nearby French forces were besieging Cádiz, Lieutenant de Vaisseau Grivel orchestrated a grand escape plan. With the help of a few fellow Guard Sailors and an array of desperate prisoners, they planned to take advantage of the recent pattern of favorable winds to steal a Spanish boat. On February 22, 1810, two Sailors of the Guard came down to a recently moored Spanish guard-boat. The Spanish guards on the boat had expected the French prisoners to clean and maintain the boat lines, however these two sailors instead came up to them with the guise of buying thread and needles from them. Grivel himself then walked towards the Guards:

"Pardon me, gentlemen," I said presenting myself at the ladder. Arrived there, I opened my arms: it was the agreed signal. Immediately, they jumped at the throats of the Spanish sailors who, surprised by this sudden attack, did not resist and threw themselves into the sea, while I went down and went to put myself at the helm. I gained this post through the scuffle and said immediately: "Let's go! cut!".

— Lieutenant De Vaisseau Grivel: Personal Memoirs

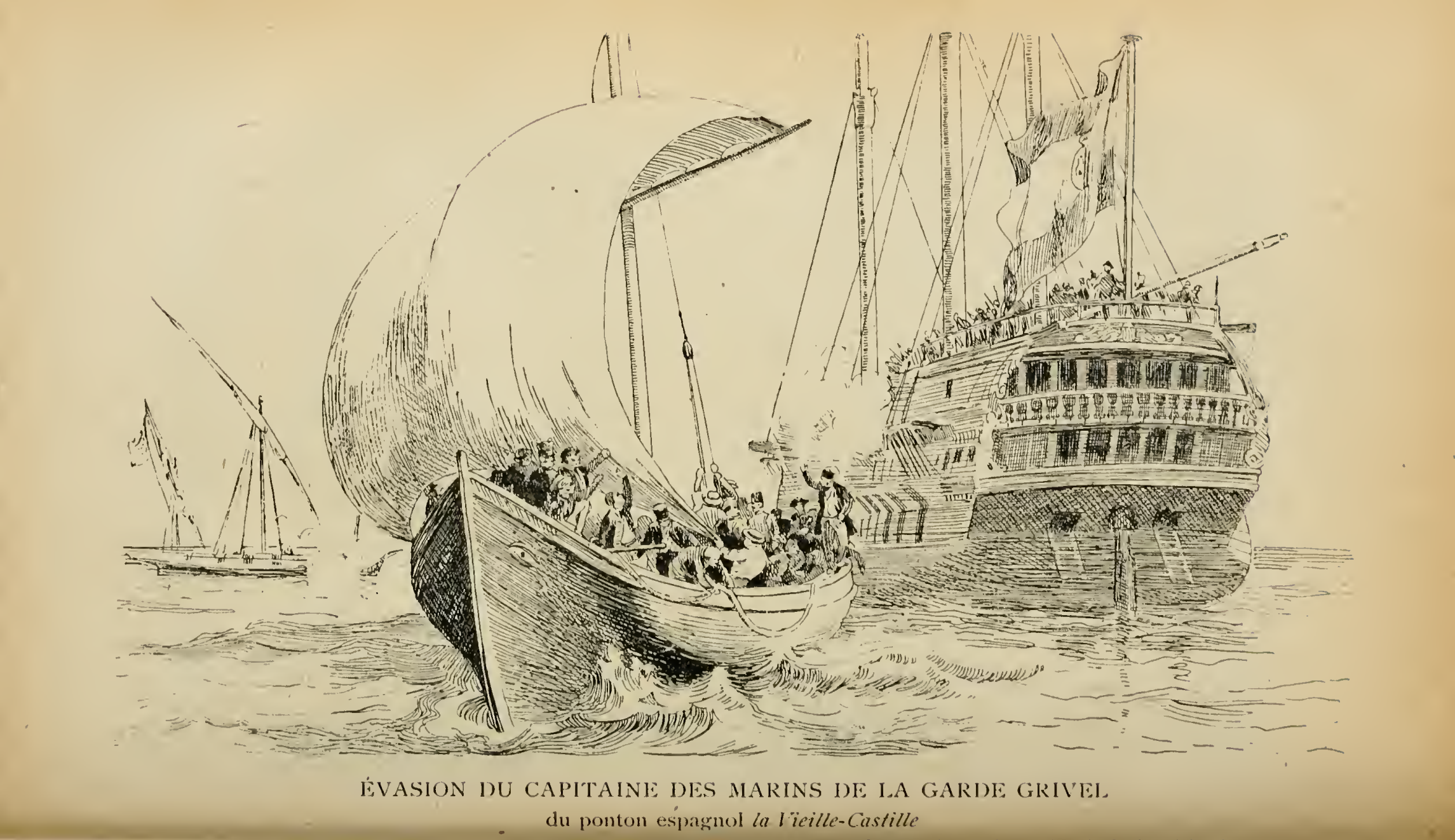
The daring escape by Captain Grivel from the prison ship La Vieja Castilla (By G. Amoretti).

Having secured the boat, they set open the sail, and escaped. Maneuvering themselves towards French lines, they evaded Spanish and British gunboats, arriving safely along the sand among their French allies. Inspired by Grivel's escape, Lieutenant de Vaisseau Moreau and 700 men of the prison hulk Vieille-Castille planned an escape. On May 15, 1810, they took control their prison ship with ease and began drifting towards the French lines in a prison break. Nearby British ships eventually caught wind of the plot and fired salvos into the ship. One cannonball beheaded Moreau, and the Sailors fired back. After a brief firefight, they arrived close to French lines. Grivel and the Guard Sailors from the previous escape immediately took to evacuate those on the Vielle Castille, setting it ablaze afterward. These men immediately took to helping the besiegers of Cadiz with a renewed fury.

The French prisoners on the Spanish ship L'Argonaute, also inspired by the recent prison breaks, began to plan for escape. A poorly kept hospital ship with 600 sick and dying, along with around sixty able-bodied, the Guard Sailors of the ship decided they too would escape. On May 26, 1810, the three sailors called upon their co-conspirers, 20 other brave men, to cut the anchors and cables of the ship with hopes it will drift towards French lines. These three sailors are remarked to have rid the ship of all guards. As the ship drifted, it came under heavy bombardment by British and Spanish ships. As night set upon the bombardment, Grivel and other Sailors of the Guard, impatient for its arrival, sailed towards the ship and evacuated the men inside through cannonballs and fire:

One cannot praise too highly the conduct of the sailors who came to our aid. When the hulk caught fire, these brave men climbed on board. They removed the sick and threw them into the sea; other sailors picked them up to embark them. These sailors belonged to the Imperial Guard; the generous, the valiant Grivel commanded them. Arriving on the beach, I saw two officers who were walking and who appeared to direct the disembarkation. I flew to them, I embraced the first one I met, it was Mr. Grivel. He clasped me in his arms and sent me away saying that he was at his post and that mine must be further away. I started to run until I was out of range of the bombs and cannonballs.

— Sébastien Blaze: Memoirs of an Assistant Surgeon

The Sailors of the Guard, having escaped captivity, immediately joined the siege of Cádiz. Grivel had even grown a garden of tomatoes, and happily fished with his men as they sieged the Spanish city. The men were soon called back to France in 1811 to join a new battalion of Guard Sailors for Napoleon's upcoming war with Russia. On their way back to France, a few queridas, followed the Sailors back. The road to France was extremely dangerous, and it is noted that the Guard Sailors partook in fights against great guerilla bands such as the Mina Band, as well as skirmishes with Wellington's own reconnaissance cavalry. When they arrived in Paris around September 1813, one would be married to a Guard Sailor by order of Grivel himself, who was taken aback by the querida's loyalty.

=== Reorganization and continued service ===
A decree by Napoleon on March 27, 1809, had reduced the Sailors of the Guard to 149 men. One crew. Made up of remaining Guard Sailors and some newly levied men by the navy, under the command of Captain de vaisseau Pierre Baste. This force was separated between those who would follow Marshal Bessières back into Spain, 65 men total, and those who would police waterways on the lugger Le Saint-Ander, 24 men total. On September 1, 1810, 8 more crews were added, raising the unit's strength to 1,136 officers, NCOs and ratings.

During the Austrian Campaign in 1809, the Sailors of the Guard were given the task of commanding and drilling the 44th Battalion of the Flotilla, for their expected operations along the Danube. However, operations had not gone as smoothly as expected, and Napoleon became increasingly frustrated at their poor performance in comparison to the services he was used to from his Guard Sailors.

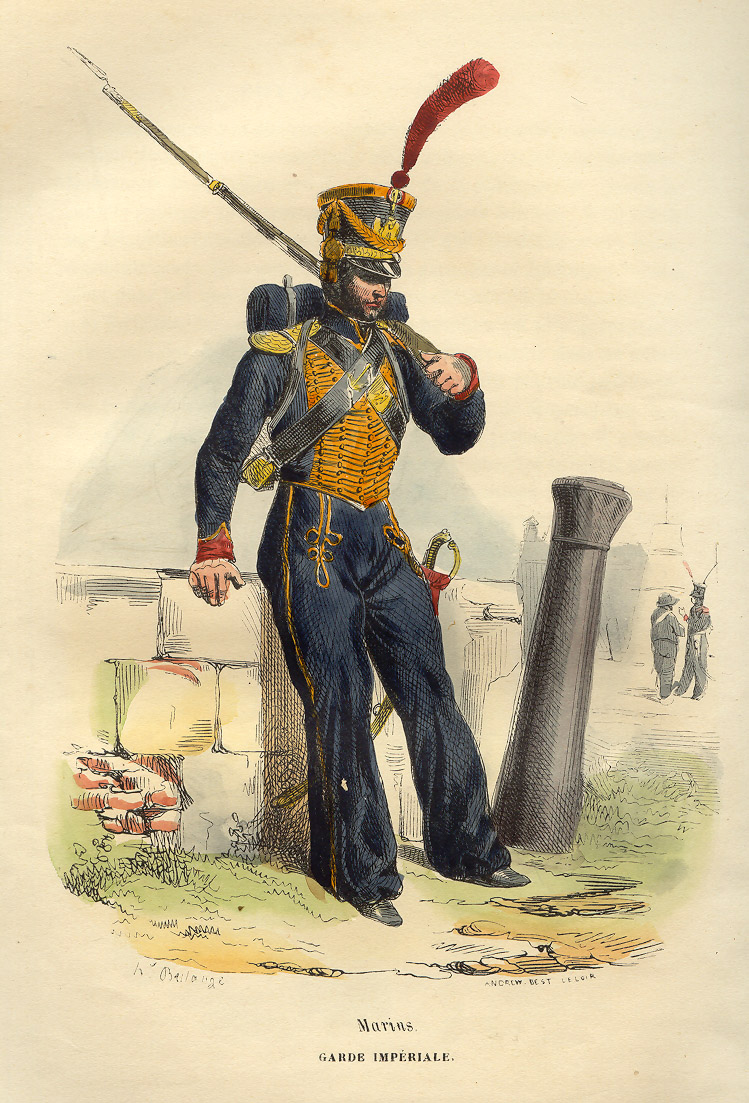
1843 illustration of a Sailor of the Imperial Guard

Monsieur Decrès, as the battalion of the flotilla that is here must be kept at full strength, dispatch a marching company of 100 men, taken from the different ports, but all true sailors, for I must not hide from you that this battalion does not do great honor to the navy. However, the officers are good and the battalion has been useful, but out of 1,000 of these men, there is not half of them who are worth our pontonniers. Send us, then, good sailors. See also where my company of Sailors of the Guard is located. If there were more of my old Sailors of the Guard than the formation the company allows, make them depart nevertheless and coordinate with the Minister of War so that they rejoin by post. I prefer one hundred men like those to all your battalions of marine.

— Napoleon I

The Sailors of the Guard continued their services in the Battle of Essling and the Battle of Wagram. Here they provided the army with a steady supply of food and munitions, on occasion a detachment would serve in the Guard Artillery. From September 1–2, 1809, there was a grand parade at Schoenbrunn; the Guard Sailors appeared there with the other corps of the Imperial Guard. The Emperor stopped before the front of the crew and complimented them; telling his Sailors that they had come very quickly.

In April 1810, the Sailors of the Guard accompanied the Emperor Napoleon and Empress Marie-Louise from Vincennes to Antwerp. In this royal outing by Napoleon, he boasted his Naval power to his new Empress. The Guard Sailors remained as Napoleon's personal guard for the next month.

As of January 27, 1811, the Corps of Guard Sailors was as such:

First Company Lieutenant de vaisseau, captain: Thanaron Pierre-Paul

Second Company Lieutenant de vaisseau, captain: Etchegaray Michel

Third Company; Of which was made up of the survivors of Spain, and the most veteran of the Corps of Guard Sailors Lieutenant de vaisseau, captain: Grivel Jean-Baptiste

Fourth Company Lieutenant de vaisseau, captain: Margueritte Eugène

Fifth Company Lieutenant de vaisseau, captain: Le Roy Jean

Sixth Company Lieutenant de vaisseau, captain: de Rigny Henri

Two companies were sent to reinforce the Portugal Campaigns, being commanded under Marshal Ney's rearguard. Two companies, the 3rd and 5th Crews, were sent to Brest and Antwerp, respectively, to reinforce and secure the coastal towns. Two companies, the 2nd and 6th Crews, (250 men) would go with the rest of the Grande Armee into Russia.

=== The Russian Campaign ===
In July 1812, the Sailors of the Guard were attached to the engineers of the army. In this role they aided in bridgebuilding and river crossings across Germany and through the Neman River. They traveled without much gruesome events through Russia, with both companies reuniting in Smolensk on August 10.

Arriving to the Battle of Borodino in full, they partook in Napoleon's exception of use of the Old Guard reserves. Fearing that the inclusion of Barclay's Corps in the Russian lines were an indicator of a potential massed attack, he ordered General Sorbier's Guard Artillery, including the Guard Sailors aid in the annihilation of the Russian effort. The result was a stalemate of right center. However their expertise in cannon was impressive to the eyes of Napoleon, and he gave each company six batteries to care for and use.

Arriving in Moscow, they accompanied Napoleon wherever he went, and followed directly alongside him when the time came for them to retreat the flaming city. The retreat from Russia was when the Sailor corps suffered the greatest losses, mostly to Cossack raids, of whom many Guard Sailors would become prisoners. However, they would shine once more in the Battle of Berezina, where they would brave the freezing waters to construct the vital bridges, and defend against opportunistic Cossacks at the same time throughout the entirety of the battle. After Berezina, they would be virtually destroyed. By the time they reached France in December 1813, only 85 would remain from the 250. Of course not counting the escaped Cossack prisoners who would trickle back into France for the next two years.

=== The Last campaigns ===
By the time of February 13, 1813, 3rd Company was temporarily placed as a Young Guard Unit. Reasons unknown, it was reinstated as an Old Guard regiment by September of the same year. In that time, they fought in the Battle of Lutzen, beating back Prussian cavalry, before switching to a sapper-role and digging out culverts for the army. 3rd Company later fought at the Battle of Leipzig with the Imperial Guard under Napoleon. It is thought a detachment had fought in part at Möckern, as Von Hiller had suggested, but they did not partake in its defense. Rather they served a minor role in the Reserve Artillery as part of the Old Guard. By November 5, 1813, 3rd Company would end with 107 Sailors from their 148.

In January 1814, the 3rd, 6th, and 7th, crews combined to a total of 450 men, and were integrated into General Friant's 1st Division of Old Guard. The unit took part in the campaign in north-east France, notably the Battle of Paris. On January 29, 1814, they fought at Brienne, where Pierre Baste was beheaded by a Russian cannonball. On February 1, they were integrated into the engineer portion of the division. On February 10, they charged with Friant's Old Guard at L'Epine Aux Bois at bayonet point during the Battle of Montmirail, killing 8000 by morning. On February 18, they took victory at Montereau. On March 2, after Prussian forces demolished the bridge at Marne, the Guard Sailors rebuilt it in a night, chasing the Prussians and beating them at Craonne. On March 9, they took a loss at the Battle of Laon.

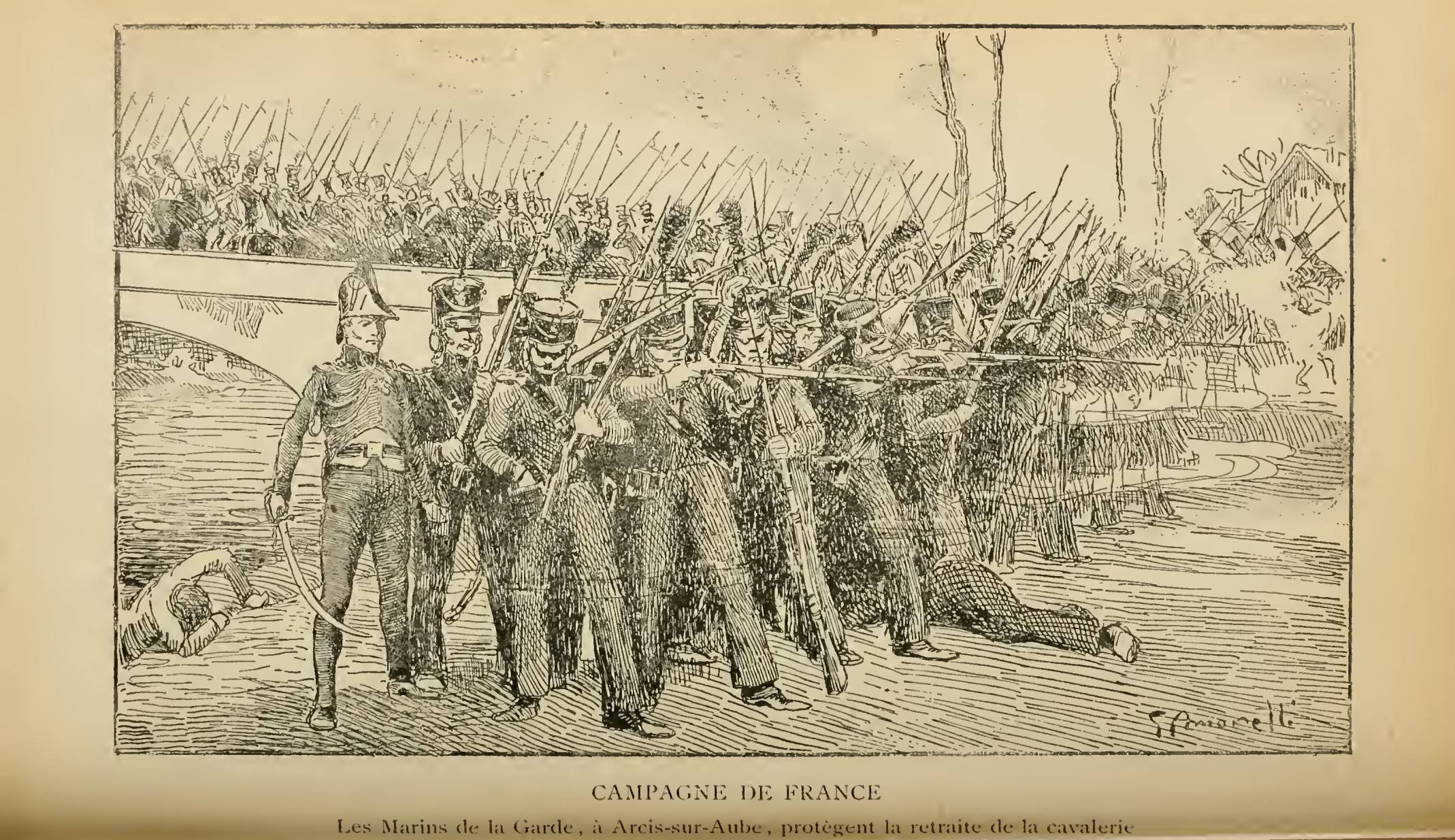
The Sailors of the Guard, at Arcis-sur-Aube, protect the retreat of the cavalry, By G. Amoretti

On March 20, they fought at the Battle of Arcis-sur-Aube, where they were not committed in the first day. However, as Napoleon realized the size of the army he faced, he fled. On the second day, in the city, the Sailors of the Guard marched to escape across the bridge in order, facing the enemy loosely and without much threat. Around this time, a cavalry commander of unknown status delivered a plea to help for the Guard Sailors, stating that the Guard cavalry were being pressured by enemy infantry on La Villete bridge, and would be decimated if without assistance. The Guard Sailors hastened towards the bridgehead where they were met by over 30 enemy squadrons. They formed up and opened fire, setting the enemy to flight. They held the rearguard of the Guard until the last cavalier had crossed, they then crossed themselves, and burned the bridge behind them. They took three casualties. On their forced March to Paris, they were saddened and furious to hear its surrender to the coalition. During Napoleon's farewell to his Old Guard, only a few officers of the Sailors of the Guard were present, the rest were marching to Le Havre to be disbanded. On June 30, 1814, they were disbanded.

=== From Elba to Waterloo ===
A small detachment of 21 sailors from the unit accompanied Napoleon into exile on Elba. On Elba, Lieutenant de Vaisseau Taillade was given command of the Sailors of the Guard. From here, Taillade kept close with Napoleon. Napoleon, in Elba, was refused his promised amenities constantly, and on one occasion, an order to kidnap Napoleon was presented to Taillade. It was promptly refused and reported to Napoleon, who was then adamant on departing Elba at once. On February 7, 1815, Lieutenant de Vaisseau Taillade organized with his men the escape of Napoleon from Elba on the ship L'Inconstant. It was successful, and on landing back in France, were made to march second in column behind the Old Guard 1st Grenadiers. In Paris, Sailors of the Guard from before disbandment flocked back to the service of the emperor. The Corps was reconstituted to 150 men, where they immediately volunteered for the defense of France. Their armament in this period were Dragoon Carbines, due to the lack of equipment that plagued Napoleon's Hundred Days.

On June 15, 1815, the Sailors of the Guard served a major role in the taking of Charleroi. Here they overran the Prussians on Charleroi bridge, blowing up the gates and clearing the city of all resistance. At the Battle of Waterloo, they played their role as Guard Artillery for a majority of the battle. In the final moments of the battle, they formed up the last square of Old Guard. They went from 150 men to 57 men by the end of the battle, Taillade himself had gone missing in this time as well. At Aubervillier, where they retreated to in good order, they were reinforced to 93 men, and given the task of defending the village to the bitter end. They did so until Napoleon's second abdication.

=== Final Dissolution ===
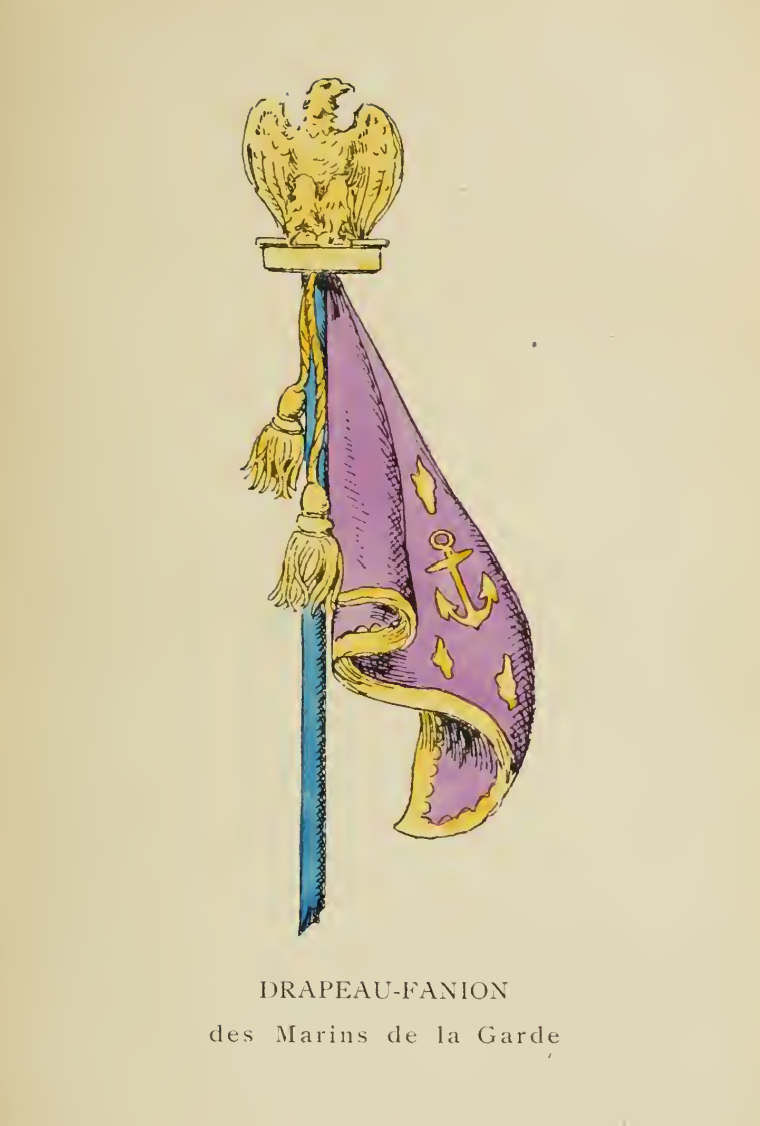
The standard of the Sailors of the Imperial Guard. On it a golden anchor is surrounded by imperial bees. (G. Amoretti)

On August 10, 1815, by decree of King Louis of France, the final dissolution of the Sailors of the Guard would occur. With men to have been with Napoleon from 1796 to 1815, they incorporated a remarkable corps during the Napoleonic Wars.

Come! Sailors of the Guard, the great epic has ended, the laurels are gathered. You are going, now, to leave this flag that you have accompanied in all the countries of Europe... If, as I explained at the beginning of this work, historians have too often shown forgetfulness with regard to the Sailors of the Guard, it is true to say that this forgetfulness has not been general. Indeed, on the pediment of the Pantheon, due to the chisel of the sculptor Réville, one sees a woman personifying France who presents to soldiers of all arms crowns of laurels; at her feet the Muse of History records their exploits. Beside a soldier of the first Republic, in front of a little drummer who already is in possession of a crown which he presses with love on his heart, one sees a Sailor of the Imperial Guard in full uniform, in arms, sack on back, who advances to receive in his turn, from the hands of France, the crown of laurels, reward of so many years of glory and valiance, crown that with his comrades of the battalion of the Guard, he has so well deserved.

— Dr. Lomier

== Uniform: Parade Dress ==
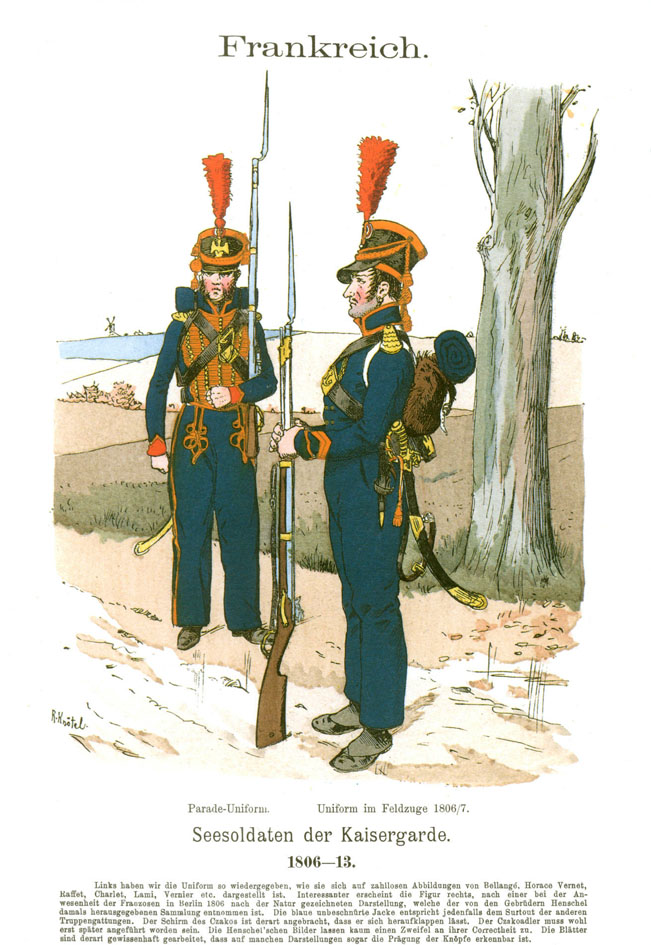
Guard Sailor in full dress: Note pre-1806 trouser braid patterns (left) and campaign dress: Note pre-1806 shako model (right) by Richard Knötel (1890)

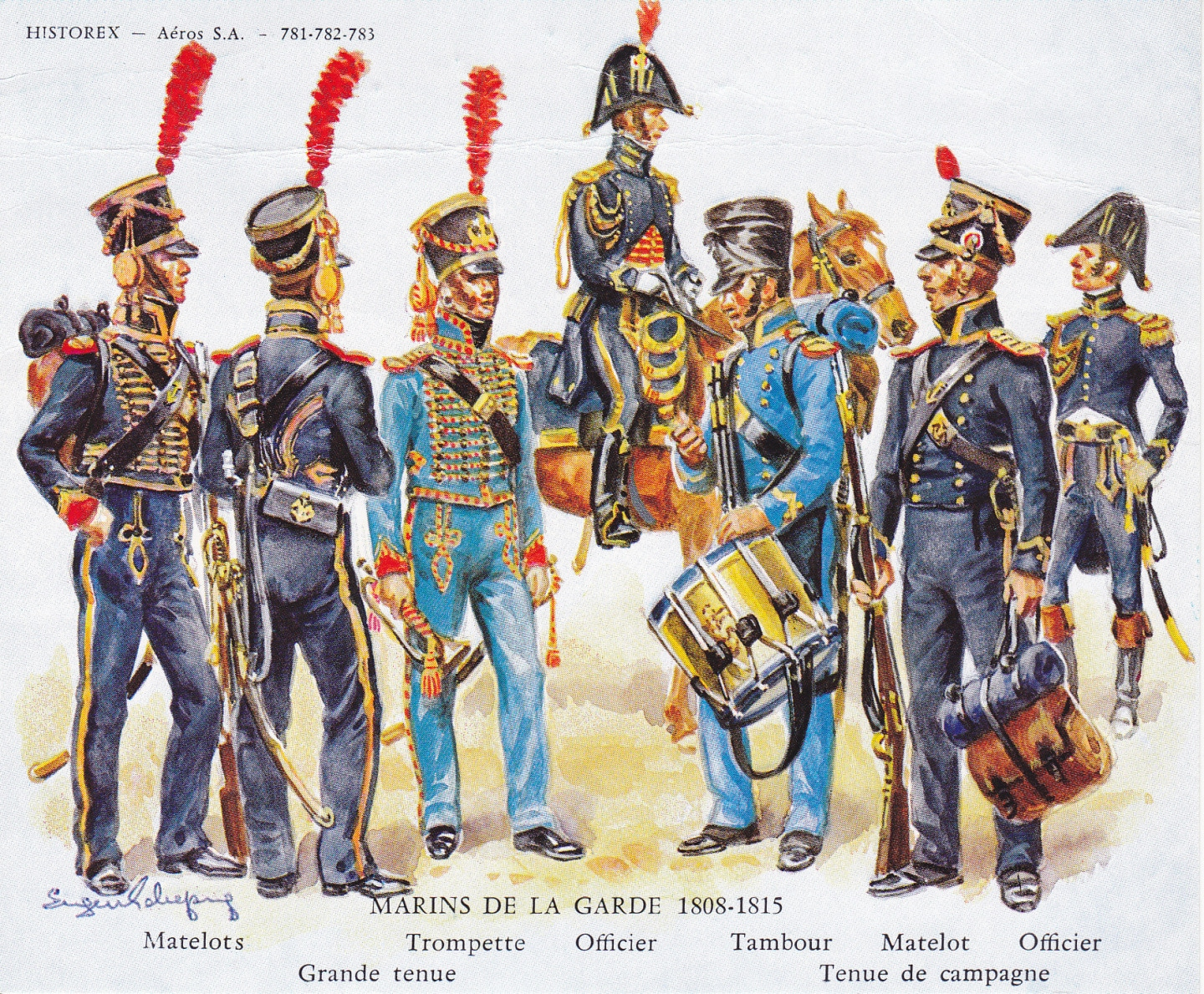
A portion of the intricate uniforms of the Sailors of the Imperial Guard.

=== 1804 ===
The uniform consisted of a navy blue tunic and trousers with a complicated Hungarian knot on each thigh. The dolman consisted of red cuffs and three rows of brass buttons etched with an anchor and "Garde des Consuls". Scaled brass epaulettes decorated the shoulders. The shako was black with aurora laces, chevrons and cords, rackets and such massing on the left. The visor for the shako rested above the lower aurora braid. A cockade adorned the top center of the shako, a scarlet plume rising from it. The shoes, waistbelt and cross-belt were black leather. The belt holding the giberne was worn around the waist, with the symbol of an anchor and a flat edge on the flap.

=== 1811 ===
The uniform underwent many changes throughout the years in slow succession (1806, 1808, 1811). The Hungarian knot on the trousers were majorly simplified from its previous version. The buttons on the dolman were replaced with ones showing the imperial eagle atop an anchor, in five rows against the dolman instead of three. The sabre belt buckle is now updated to the imperial eagle at this time, with the giberne now strapped across the shoulder, its symbol also being switched to the imperial eagle, and its flap scalloped. The haversack straps officially are issued as black.

The shako underwent major changes as well. A brass imperial eagle atop an anchor replaced the front-center cockade, the rackets moved to the right side, and the visor lowered below the lower aurora braiding. It is now that the cockade is depicted against the left-side of the shako. The chin-straps are of black leather, despite popular media showing scaled versions. The greatcoat, waistcoat, and epaulettes underwent no change.

As for the musicians of the Guard Sailors, they are surrounded by mystery. It is assumed from contracts and shopping orders that they were similar to those of petty officers, except with a sky blue background. However other reconstructions, possibly higher ranking musicians, are shown with bicorne and uniforms similar to those of a boatswain.

The officers wore navy blue uniforms like their infantry counterparts, but had an aiguillette draped across the right shoulder. On the left shoulder they had a golden epaulette. The shako is replaced by a bicorne with a large red plume.

== Commanders ==
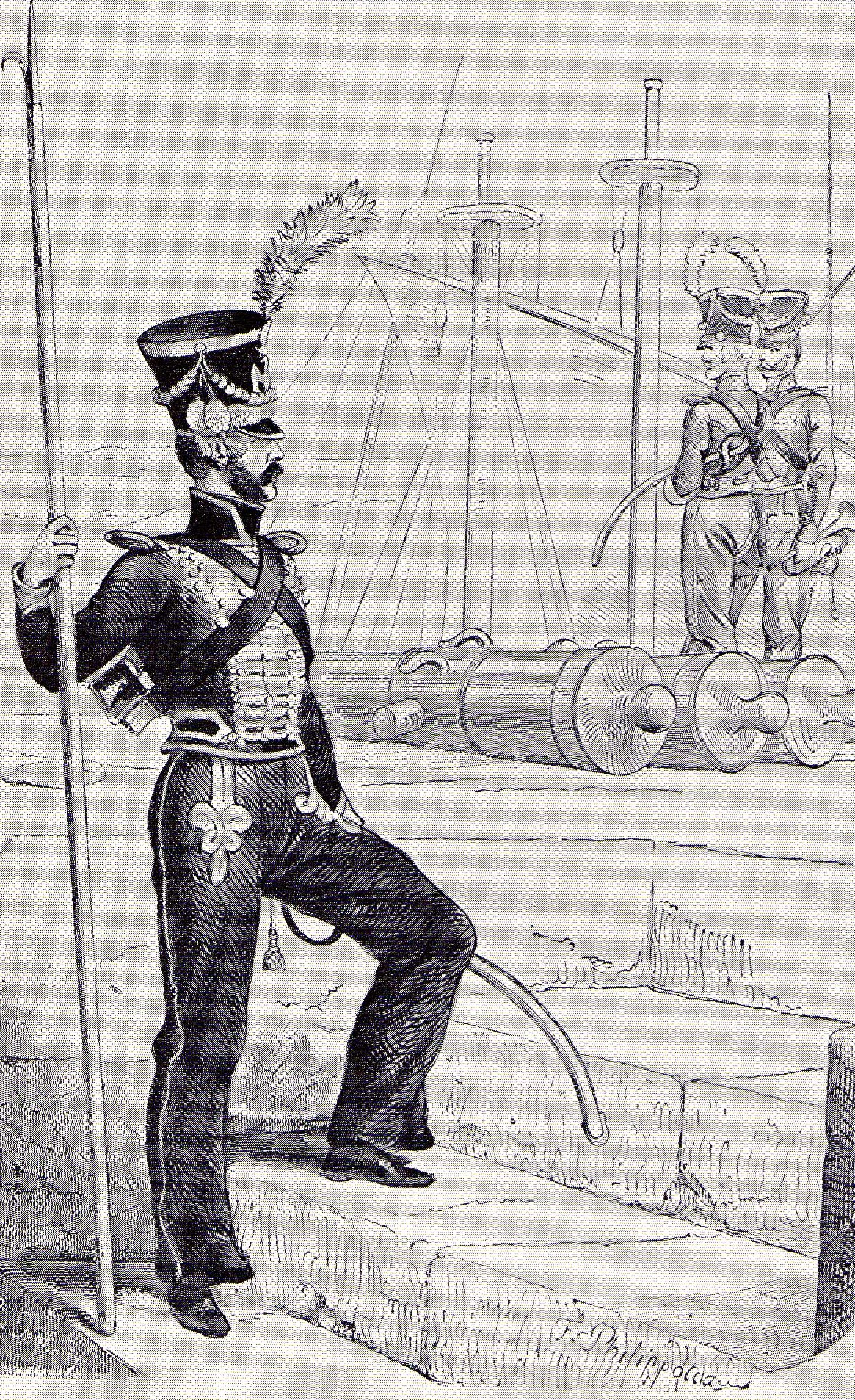
A sailor of the Guard in 1810 (engraving by Félix Philippoteaux).

- 1803 : Jean-Baptiste Grivel
- 1805 : François Henri Eugène Daugier
- 1809 : Pierre Baste
- 1810 : Antoine Vattier
- 1811 : Honoré Joseph Antoine Ganteaume
- 1813 : Louis Pierre François Ricard Barthélémy de Saizeu
- 1815 : Capitaine de frégate François Louis Taillade
