= Croisière de Bruix order of battle =

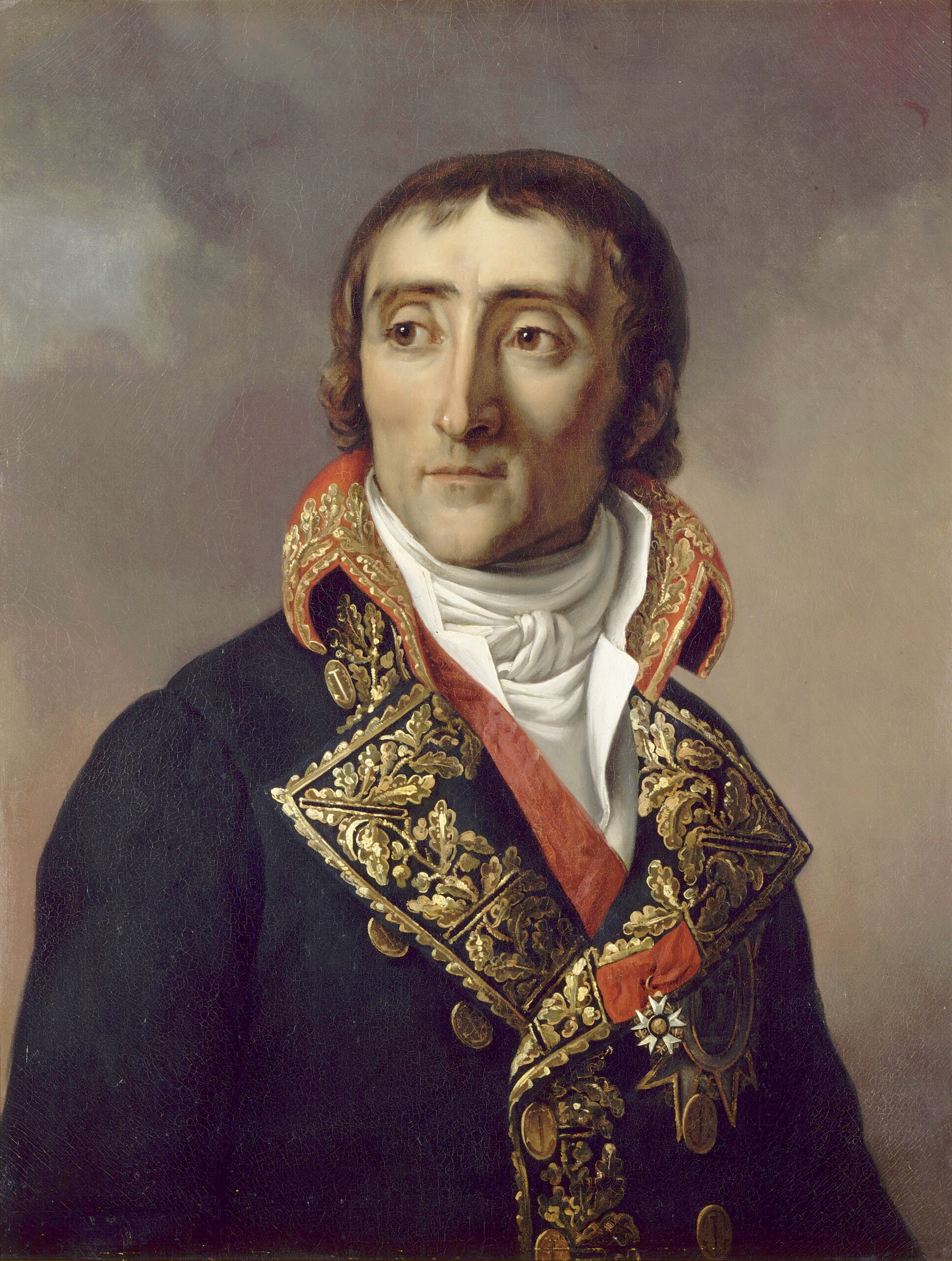
Étienne Eustache Bruix, the leader of the campaign

The Croisière de Bruix (also known as Bruix's expedition of 1799) was a French naval campaign of the War of the Second Coalition. Planned and commanded by Vice-admiral Étienne Eustache Bruix, the operation was an attempt to restore French control of the Mediterranean Sea, lost at the Battle of the Nile in August 1798. Taking command of the French Atlantic Fleet based at Brest, Bruix mustered one of the largest and best trained French fleets to take to sea during the war. Brest was under close blockade by the British Channel Fleet, but Bruix arranged for misleading intelligence regarding an impending invasion of Ireland to fall into British hands, which drew the blockade fleet under Lord Bridport away to the north. On 25 April 1799 the French fleet of 25 ships of the line sailed into the Atlantic unopposed, sighted the following day by the frigate HMS Nymphe. Reports reached Bridport soon afterwards, but he remained on station off Ireland, anticipating a French attack.

With his route clear, Bruix sailed southwest. On 30 April the fleet passed the Spanish naval base of Ferrol, anticipating a union with the Spanish squadron stationed there, but the Spanish had already sailed and the two forces missed one another. The first British opposition to Bruix advance came on 4 May, when he found the British Mediterranean fleet under Vice-Admiral Lord Keith arrayed between his force and the principal Spanish fleet base of Cádiz. This prevented the Spanish and French fleets from joining together, Bruix instead taking advantage of the prevailing winds to pass through the Straits of Gibraltar unopposed. Keith set off in pursuit, gathering his forces off Mahón on Menorca while the French fleet made for Toulon and the main Spanish fleet, which had followed the French and British through the Straits, reached Cartagena. As Bruix resupplied and convoyed reinforcements to the embattled French armies in Northern Italy, Keith remained on station off Cartagena. His operation was hindered by a confused command structure: Keith was only acting commander of the Mediterranean Fleet while Earl St Vincent remained on shore at Gibraltar and Mahón, with only such brief sojourns with the fleet as his failing health permitted. Keith and St. Vincent issued contradictory orders throughout the campaign, Keith intent on pursuing the French while St. Vincent was preoccupied with the threat from the Spanish. This problem was compounded by the behaviour of Vice-Admiral Lord Nelson, commander in the Eastern Mediterranean and subordinate to Keith and St. Vincent. Nelson, embroiled in the complex politics of the Kingdom of Naples and increasingly under the influence of his lover Emma, Lady Hamilton, repeatedly refused direct orders to participate in the campaign.

In early June Keith's fleet investigated Toulon but found the French absent, although a French frigate squadron was intercepted and captured off the port. Turning west, Keith sailed to Genoa but again found that the French had departed ahead of the British, Bruix successfully uniting with the Spanish off Cartagena on 22 June and sailing on 24 June with a fleet of more than 40 ships of the line; at the time the largest naval force in the world. Turning southwest, the combined fleet sailed through the Straits of Gibraltar on 7 July intending to return to Brest. Keith remained off Menorca for sometime, resupplying his ships and repeatedly ordering Nelson to take over protection of the island base, orders which Nelson completely disregarded. Keith's fleet was joined during this period by reinforcements sent from the Channel Fleet under Sir Charles Cotton and Cuthbert Collingwood, but it did not follow the allies through the Straits until 29 July, 22 days behind Bruix. For the next two weeks, Keith chased the Bruix northwards towards the French coast, the British fleet gaining on the French day by day, arriving off Brest on 14 August to discover that Bruix and the combined fleet had arrived safely in the harbour only the day before.

Although Bruix did manage to affect the union of the main French and Spanish battle fleets, the campaign was inconclusive. The strategic situation in European waters remained unchanged; by mid-August 1799 the Royal Navy still controlled the Mediterranean unopposed, free to plan and implement the seizure of French territories in the region without impediment. In Northern European waters the huge allied fleet at Brest presented a considerable threat but remained under blockade by the Channel Fleet. With the exception of a series of fruitless expeditions in 1801 there were no further major French or Spanish operations at sea before the Peace of Amiens brought the war to a temporary close in 1801.

== Allied fleets ==
French Atlantic Fleet
Ship	Rate	Guns	Commander	Notes
Océan	First rate	120	Vice-amiral Étienne Eustache Bruix; Captain Alain-Adélaïde-Marie de Bruillac	With the fleet 25 April – 13 August
Invincible	First rate	110	Commodore Louis Lhéritier	With the fleet 25 April – 13 August
Terrible	First rate	110	Commodore Yves Haouen	With the fleet 25 April – 13 August
Républicain	First rate	110	Captain Charles Berrenger	With the fleet 25 April – 13 August
Indomptable	Third rate	80	Captain Chambon	With the fleet 25 April – 13 August
Formidable	Third rate	80	Commodore Pierre-Julien Thréouart	With the fleet 25 April – 13 August
Jemmapes	Third rate	74	Captain Julien Cosmao	With the fleet 25 April – 13 August
Mont Blanc	Third rate	74	Captain Esprit-Tranquille Maistral	With the fleet 25 April – 13 August
Tyrannicide	Third rate	74	Captain Zacharie Allemand	With the fleet 25 April – 13 August
Batave	Third rate	74	Captain François Henri Eugène Daugier	With the fleet 25 April – 13 August
Constitution	Third rate	74	Captain Julien Le Ray	With the fleet 25 April – 13 August
Duquesne	Third rate	74	Captain Pierre-Maurice-Julien Quérangal	With the fleet 25 April – 13 August
Fougueux	Third rate	74	Captain Pierre-Marie Bescont	With the fleet 25 April – 13 August
Zélé	Third rate	74	Captain Dufoy	With the fleet 25 April – 13 August
Redoutable	Third rate	74	Captain Pierre-Augustin Moncousu	With the fleet 25 April – 13 August
Wattignies	Third rate	74	Captain Antoine Louis de Gourdon	With the fleet 25 April – 13 August
Tourville	Third rate	74	Captain Jean-Baptiste Henry	With the fleet 25 April – 13 August
Cisalpin	Third rate	74	Captain Mathieu-Charles Bergevin	With the fleet 25 April – 13 August
Jean Bart	Third rate	74	Captain François-Jacques Meynne	With the fleet 25 April – 13 August
Gaulois	Third rate	74	Captain Gabriel Siméon	With the fleet 25 April – 13 August
Convention	Third rate	74	Captain Charles-Hélène Le Bozec	Delayed leaving Brest, joined the fleet on 26 April. Remained during campaign until 13 August.
Révolution	Third rate	74	Captain Pierre-Nicolas Rolland	With the fleet 25 April – 13 August
Jean-Jacques Rousseau	Third rate	74	Captain Julien-Gabriel Bigot de la Robillardière	With the fleet 25 April – 13 August
Dix-Août	Third rate	74	Captain Jacques Bergeret	With the fleet 25 April – 13 August
Censeur	Third rate	74	Captain Antoine-Jean-Baptiste Faye	With the fleet 25 April. Detached to Cádiz on 4 May in sinking condition. Exchanged on 12 July for Spanish ship San Sebastian but never sailed again.
Alliance	Third rate	74	Captain Antoine-Jean-Baptiste Faye	Former Spanish ship San Sebastian exchanged for unseaworthy Censeur at Cádiz on 12 June.
Romaine	Fifth rate	44		With the fleet 25 April – 13 August
Créole	Fifth rate	40		With the fleet 25 April – 13 August
Bravoure	Fifth rate	40		With the fleet 25 April – 13 August
Cocarde	Fifth rate	36		With the fleet 25 April – 13 August
Fraternité	Fifth rate	36		With the fleet 25 April – 13 August
Fidèle	Fifth rate	32		With the fleet 25 April – 13 August. Armed en flute
Berceau	Corvette	20		With the fleet 25 April – 13 August
Tactique	Corvette	20		With the fleet 25 April – 13 August
Biche	Aviso	8		With the fleet 25 April – 13 August
Découverte	Aviso	8		With the fleet 25 April – 13 August
During the campaign several contre-amirals accompanied the fleet but did not have designated flagships, moving as required. They were Jean-Louis Delmotte, Jacques Bedout, Jean-François Courand, Alain-Joseph Dordelin and Charles Linois. Two ships of the line were damaged in a collision around 12 June and remained at Toulon for repairs, rejoining the fleet on 9 July, but they are not named in the sources.
Sources: James, pp. 254–268; Quintin

Spanish Fleet
Ship	Rate	Guns	Commander	Notes
Conception	First rate	112	Teniente-General José de Mazzaredo; Brigadier Antonio de Escaño; Capitán Francisco Uriarte	With the Spanish fleet 14 May. Badly damaged in storm on 17 May. Reached Brest with combined fleet 13 August.
Mexicano	First rate	112	Jefe de escuadra Domingo de Nava; Capitán José Gardoqui	With the Spanish fleet 14 May. Badly damaged in storm on 17 May, four men killed. Detached at Cádiz on 21 July.
Santa Ana	First rate	112	Teniente-General Domingo Grandallana; Brigadier Baltasar Hidalgo de Cisneros	With the Spanish fleet 14 May. Detached at Cádiz on 21 July after badly damaged in grounding.
Conde de Regla	First rate	112	Jefe de escuadra Antonio de Córdova; Brigadier José de Escaño	With the Spanish fleet 14 May. Reached Brest with combined fleet 13 August.
Principe de Asturias	First rate	112	Teniente-General Federico Gravina; Brigadier Juan Vicente Yañez	With the Spanish fleet 14 May. Reached Brest with combined fleet 13 August.
Reina Luisa	First rate	112		Joined Spanish fleet at Cartagena after 17 May under command of Domingo de Nava. Reached Brest with combined fleet 13 August.
Neptuno	Third rate	80	Jefe de escuadra Juan Villavicencio; Capitán Bernardo Muñoz	With the Spanish fleet 14 May. Reached Brest with combined fleet 13 August.
Bahama	Third rate	74	Capitán José Aramburu	With the Spanish fleet 14 May. Reached Brest with combined fleet 13 August.
Conquistador	Third rate	74	Capitán Cosme Churruca	With the Spanish fleet 14 May. Badly damaged in storm on 17 May. Reached Brest with combined fleet 13 August.
Oriente	Third rate	74	Brigadier Nicolás Estrada	With the Spanish fleet 14 May. Badly damaged in storm on 17 May. Detached at Cartagena and crew transferred to Guerrero.
Guerrero	Third rate	74		With the Spanish fleet after 17 May. Reached Brest with combined fleet 13 August.
Infante don Pelayo	Third rate	74	Capitán Cayetano Valdés	With the Spanish fleet 14 May. Badly damaged in storm on 17 May. Reached Brest with combined fleet 13 August.
San Francisco de Asis	Third rate	74	Brigadier José de Goicoechea	With the Spanish fleet 14 May. Badly damaged in storm on 17 May. Reached Brest with combined fleet 13 August.
San Francisco de Paulo	Third rate	74	Capitán Agustín Figueroa	With the Spanish fleet 14 May. Reached Brest with combined fleet 13 August.
San Joaquin	Third rate	74	Capitán Marcelo Espínola	With the Spanish fleet 14 May. Badly damaged in storm on 17 May. Reached Brest with combined fleet 13 August.
San Pablo	Third rate	74	Brigadier Luis Vallabriga	With the Spanish fleet 14 May. Reached Brest with combined fleet 13 August.
San Telmo	Third rate	74	Capitán Juan José Martínez	With the Spanish fleet 14 May. Badly damaged in storm on 17 May. Reached Brest with combined fleet 13 August.
Soberano	Third rate	74	Capitán Rafael Villavicencio	With the Spanish fleet 14 May. Badly damaged in storm on 17 May. Reached Brest with combined fleet 13 August.
Atocha	Frigate	40	Capitán Ignacio Olaeta	
Perla	Frigate	34	Capitán Francisco Moyuna	
Carmen	Frigate	34	Capitán Manuel Bustillos	
Santa Matilde	Frigate	40	Capitán José González	Detached at Cartagena, 17 May.
Vigilante	Brig	12	Teniente José de Córdoba	
Descubridor	Brig	12	Teniente Juan Coronado	
Vivo	Brig	12	Teniente Juan Deslobes	
Sources: James, pp. 254–268; Férnandez Duro, pp. 188–190

== Royal Navy ==
Mediterranean Fleet
Ship	Rate	Guns	Commander	Notes
HMS Ville de Paris	First rate	112	Captain Walter Bathurst	Flagship of Admiral Earl St Vincent between 10 May and 2 June when he retired sick. Detached from fleet to Mahón 2 – 15 June.
HMS Queen Charlotte	First rate	100	Vice-Admiral Lord Keith; Captain John Irwin	Joined fleet on 30 May as flagship of Rear-Admiral Whitshed. Became Keith's flagship on 13 June.
HMS Barfleur	Second rate	98	Rear-Admiral James Hawkins-Whitshed; Captain George Barker	Flagship of Lord Keith at start of campaign. Made Whitshed's flagship on 13 June.
HMS Prince George	Second rate	98	Rear-Admiral Sir William Parker; Captain William Bowen	
HMS London	Second rate	98	Captain John Child Purvis	
HMS Princess Royal	Second rate	98	Captain John Dixon	
HMS Namur	Second rate	90	Captain William Luke	
HMS Foudroyant	Third rate	80	Captain William Brown	Detached on 30 May to reinforce squadron at Palermo.
HMS Gibraltar	Third rate	80	Captain William Kelly	
HMS Montagu	Third rate	74	Captain John Knight	Engaged inshore off Toulon on 3 June.
HMS Northumberland	Third rate	74	Captain George Martin	Detached on 30 May to reinforce squadron at Palermo.
HMS Marlborough	Third rate	74	Captain Thomas Sotheby	
HMS Warrior	Third rate	74	Captain Charles Tyler	
HMS Hector	Third rate	74	Captain John Elphinstone	
HMS Defence	Third rate	74	Captain Lord Henry Paulet	
HMS Majestic	Third rate	74	Captain Robert Cuthbert	Detached on 30 May to reinforce squadron at Palermo.
HMS Edgar	Third rate	74	Rear-Admiral Thomas Frederick; Captain John McDougall	On detached service at Tétouan. Joined fleet at Gibraltar on 10 May. Badly damaged in storm of 17 May, repaired at Mahón and rejoined fleet 22 May.
HMS Leviathan	Third rate	74	Rear-Admiral John Thomas Duckworth; Captain Henry Digby	Flagship of Menorca squadron. Joined fleet on 20 May. Detached on 30 May to reinforce squadron at Palermo.
HMS Centaur	Third rate	74	Captain John Markham	Menorca squadron, joined fleet on 20 May. Engaged inshore off Toulon on 3 June. Captured Perrée's squadron on 19 June near Toulon.
HMS Bellerophon	Third rate	74	Captain Henry D'Esterre Darby	Menorca squadron, joined fleet on 20 May. Detached on 8 June to reinforce squadron at Palermo.
HMS Powerful	Third rate	74	Captain William O'Bryen Drury	Menorca squadron, joined fleet on 20 May. Detached on 8 June to reinforce squadron at Palermo.
HMS Captain	Third rate	74	Captain Sir Richard Strachan	Joined fleet on 30 May with Rear-Admiral Whitshed's squadron. Captured Perrée's squadron on 19 June near Toulon.
HMS Defiance	Third rate	74	Captain Thomas Revell Shivers	Joined fleet on 30 May with Rear-Admiral Whitshed's squadron.
HMS Bellona	Third rate	74	Captain Sir Thomas Thompson	Joined fleet on 30 May with Rear-Admiral Whitshed's squadron. Captured Perrée's squadron on 19 June near Toulon.
HMS Repulse	Third rate	74	Captain James Alms	Joined fleet on 30 May with Rear-Admiral Whitshed's squadron.
HMS Success	Fifth rate	32	Captain Shuldham Peard	Joined off Cádiz on 3 May.
HMS Emerald	Fifth rate	36	Captain Thomas Waller	Joined in the Mediterranean. Captured Perrée's squadron on 19 June near Toulon.
HMS Santa Teresa	Fifth rate	36	Captain George Barker	Joined in the Mediterranean. Captured Perrée's squadron on 19 June near Toulon.
HMS Ethalion	Fifth rate	38	Captain George Countess	Joined in the Mediterranean.
HMS Stag	Fifth rate	32	Captain Joseph Sydney Yorke	Joined on 8 August.
Sources: James, pp. 254–268

Cotton and Collingwood's reinforcement
Ship	Rate	Guns	Commander	Notes
HMS Prince	Second rate	98	Rear-Admiral Sir Charles Cotton; Captain Samuel Sutton	Detached from Channel Fleet. Joined Keith's fleet off Menorca on 7 July.
HMS Formidable	Second rate	98	Captain Edward Thornbrough	Detached from Channel Fleet. Joined Keith's fleet off Menorca on 7 July.
HMS St George	Second rate	98	Captain Sampson Edwards	Detached from Channel Fleet. Joined Keith's fleet off Menorca on 7 July.
HMS Neptune	Second rate	98	Captain James Vashon	Detached from Channel Fleet. Joined Keith's fleet off Menorca on 7 July.
HMS Glory	Second rate	98	Captain Thomas Wells	Detached from Channel Fleet. Joined Keith's fleet off Menorca on 7 July.
HMS Triumph	Third rate	74	Rear-Admiral Cuthbert Collingwood; Captain Thomas Larcom	Detached from Channel Fleet. Joined Keith's fleet off Menorca on 7 July.
HMS Dragon	Third rate	74	Captain George Campbell	Detached from Channel Fleet. Joined Keith's fleet off Menorca on 7 July.
HMS Impetueux	Third rate	74	Captain Sir Edward Pellew	Detached from Channel Fleet. Joined Keith's fleet off Menorca on 7 July.
HMS Terrible	Third rate	74	Captain Jonathon Faulknor	Detached from Channel Fleet. Joined Keith's fleet off Menorca on 7 July.
HMS Superb	Third rate	74	Captain John Sutton	Detached from Channel Fleet. Joined Keith's fleet off Menorca on 7 July.
HMS Pompee	Third rate	74	Captain Charles Stirling	Detached from Channel Fleet. Joined Keith's fleet off Menorca on 7 July.
HMS Canada	Third rate	74	Captain Michael de Courcy	Detached from Channel Fleet. Joined Keith's fleet off Menorca on 7 July.
Sources: James, pp. 254–268
