= Mackau Law =

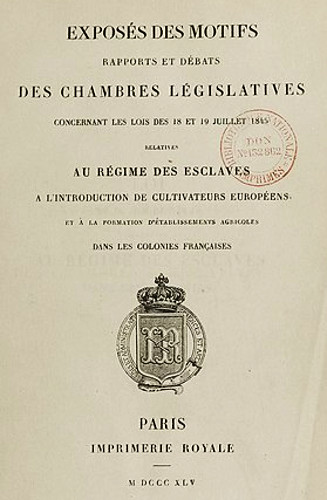
Statements of reasons, reports and debates of the legislative chambers concerning the laws of 18 and 19 July 1845 relating to the slave regime, the introduction of European farmers and the formation of agricultural establishments in the French colonies. Paris, Royal Printing, 1845.

The Laws of 18 and 19 July 1845, commonly known as Mackau Law (French: Lois Mackau) are a set of laws which paved the way towards the abolition of slavery in France. They were instigated by Ange de Mackau, then Minister of the Navy and of Colonies. Effective abolition was enacted with the Decree abolishing Slavery of 27 April 1848.

== Text ==
The Mackau laws constituted the last wave of legislation to enhance the status of slaves in France before outright abolition. They mandated a minimal duration for education of slaves, made it illegal to inflict over 15 lashes without a court order, and married slaves belonging to different masters obtained a right to family reunification.

In July 1846, Louis Philippe I abolished slavery in the Royal domains of Martinique, Guadeloupe, and the newly purchased Mayotte. However, François Guizot stalled further progress.

== Implementation ==
Previous dispositions had been implemented with various degrees of good faith in the colonies, a point of recrimination for abolitionists. For instance, the mayors of towns where new schools were opened instituted a student selection procedures obviously intended to exclude slaves. Alexandre Auguste Ledru-Rollin and Agénor de Gasparin, notably, opposed the new Mackau laws on the ground that further legislation, adding to a pile of laws that were not effectively implemented, were useless.
