= HMS Alacrity (1806) =

Brig-sloop of the Royal Navy

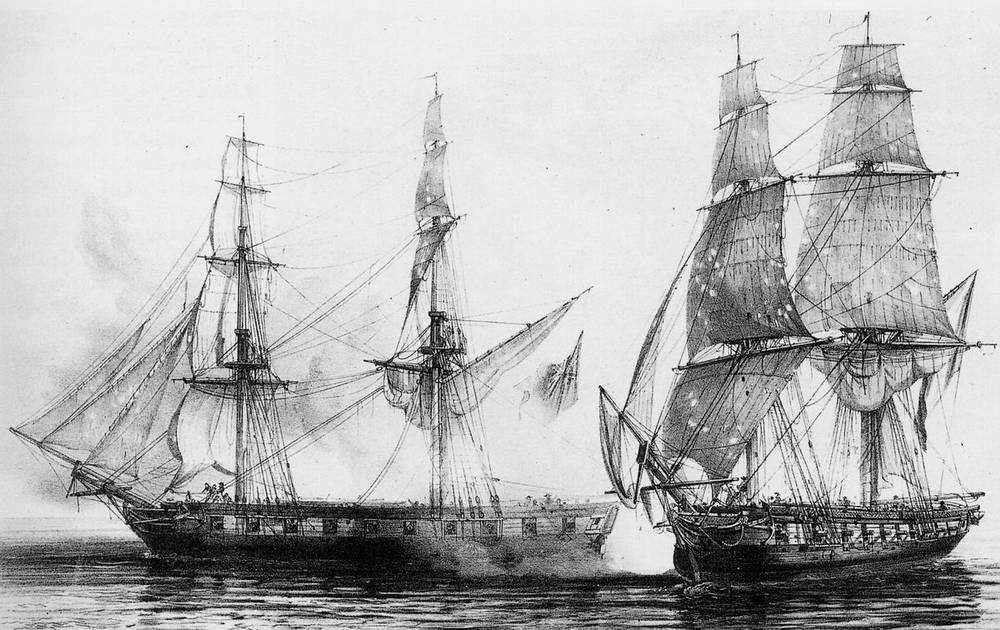
- Alacrity (left) being captured by Abeille (right) on 26 May 1811

History

United Kingdom
- Name: HMS Alacrity
- Ordered: 14 January 1806
- Builder: William Row (or Rowe), St Peter's Dock, Newcastle-on-Tyne
- Laid down: May 1806
- Launched: 13 November 1806 (ready coppered)
- Commissioned: February 1807
- Captured: 26 May 1811

France
- Name: Alacrity
- Commissioned: 1 July 1811
- Fate: Broken up 1822

General characteristics
- Type: Cruizer-class brig-sloop
- Tons burthen: 382,/ or 38223/94 (bm)
- Length: 99 ft 10 in (30.4 m) (overall); 77 ft 1 3/4 in (23.5 m) (keel)
- Beam: 30 ft 6 1/4 in (9.3 m)
- Depth of hold: 11 ft 8 in (3.6 m)
- Sail plan: Brig
- Complement: 121
- Armament: 16 × 32-pounder carronades + 2 × 6-pounder chase guns

HMS Alacrity was a Cruizer-class brig-sloop built by William Rowe at Newcastle and launched in 1806. She served in the Baltic and was at the capture of Copenhagen in 1807. She captured a large privateer before herself falling victim to a French man-of-war in 1811 in an action in which her captain failed to distinguish himself. She then served in the French navy until she was broken up in 1822.

== British service and capture ==
Alacrity was commissioned in February 1807 under Commander William Croft for the Baltic Station. On 22 August Alacrity and Sybille captured the Danish merchant vessel Elizabeth. She was then at the siege of Copenhagen. In September, Commander Nisbit Palmer assumed command, replacing Croft, who received promotion to post-captain in October. On 23 October Alacrity and Sybille captured the Bornembaum.

On 14 December Alacrity captured the French privateer Friedland in Home waters after a two-hour chase. Friedland was out of Dunkirk and armed with 14 guns. She was under the command of Francis Louis Beens who did not surrender until after he had lost one of his men killed. This was her second cruise and during the two days she had been out she had captured a Swedish galiot sailing from Stockholm to Plymouth with a cargo of iron and tar.

On 10 September 1810, Alacrity captured the French privateer Trois Frères, which had a crew of 73 men.

Early in May 1811 Alacrity took possession of a Greek vessel and sent her into Malta. This entailed sending a prize crew consisting of Alacrity's second lieutenant (Alexander Martin) and thirteen men.

On 26 May 1811, Alacrity encountered the French brig-of-war Abeille, of twenty 24-pounder carronades, off Bastia, Corsica. After an action that lasted about half an hour, during which Abeille outmaneuvered Alacrity, Alacrity struck. French accounts give her casualties as 15 killed and 20 wounded, including her captain. British accounts give her casualties as four dead and 18 wounded, including four fatally. Abeille suffered seven dead and 15 wounded.

The fight might well have gone the other way. Alacrity had a broadside of 262 pounds vs. 240 pounds for Abeille. Alacrity had also suffered fewer casualties than Abeille. However, Palmer retired to his cabin with a hand wound early in the action; once Alacrity had lost all her leadership with her officers dead, wounded or absent, this was enough to demoralize most of her crew. For his role, the French promoted the French captain, Ange René Armand-Mackau, to the rank of lieutenant de vaisseau. He was also inducted into the Legion of Honour.

A newspaper account of the capture reported that when Palmer and Alacrity had sighted Abeille, Palmer had sent three boats to cut her out. However, the French had captured the cutting-out party. They then took the boats in tow and sailed towards Alacrity with English colours hoisted over the French, a ruse suggesting that the cutting-out party had succeeded in their mission. The French ran alongside Alacrity and carried her by boarding.

Within a month of the battle Palmer died of tetanus from his otherwise minor wound. The court martial of the survivors on 30 May 1814 attributed the loss to the lack of leadership. It acquitted all the survivors and commended the boatswain, James Flaxman, who had remained on deck though wounded and had attempted to rally the crew to Alacrity's defence.

== French service ==
On 1 July 1811 she was commissioned at Toulon by lieutenant de vaisseux de Mackau. In 1812 she was at Elba and in 1815 at Gênes. On 1 July 1815 she was laid up at Toulon. In August 1822 Alacrity was beached at a shipyard in Toulon for refitting. On 20 August the shipyard received an order to cease further work as she was in such bad shape that there was no point in continuing. On 28 August breaking up commenced.

== Postscript ==
On 7 February 1814 Lieutenant de Mackau received a promotion to capitaine de corvette. Soon afterwards he was made a Baron of the French Empire. He was later promoted to capitaine de frégate and on 1 September 1819, to capitaine de vaisseau.
