= François Henri Eugène Daugier =

French naval officer and politician (1764–1834)

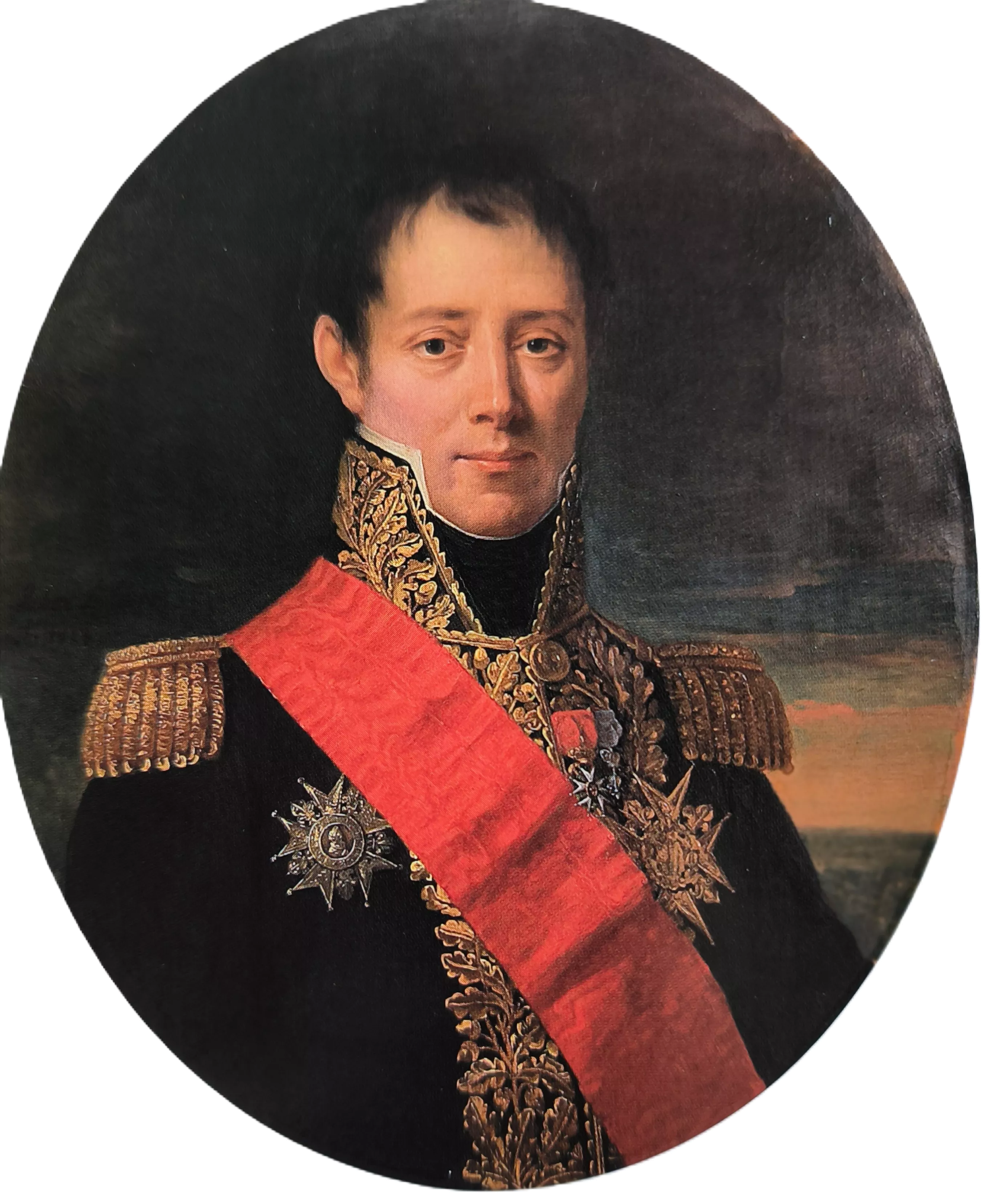
Portrait by Robert Lefèvre, 1823

François Henri Eugène Daugier (also d'Augier; 12 September 1764 – 12 April 1834, Paris) was a French naval officer and politician who served in the French Revolutionary Wars and the Napoleonic Wars.

== Life ==
=== Ancien Régime ===
Daugier was born on 12 September 1764 in Courthézon, Comtat Venaissin, the son of Joseph-Ignace d'Augier, a knight from Avignon, and Dorothée-Suzanne de Margallet. The Augier family, originally from Malaucène, had settled in Avignon in the 17th century. Daugier began his military career by joining the Gardes de la Marine in October 1782, serving on the corvette Flèche then on the Précieuse the following year. On board the Superbe he took part in several missions to the Indian Ocean before returning to France on board the Brillant in May 1786. In 1787 he joined one of the packet boats intended to ease traffic between France and the Caribbean. On his return in 1789, having risen to lieutenant de vaisseau, he perfected his training in naval tactics. He rejoined the Flèche before switching to the Tourville in the Bay of Biscay on the orders of Morard de Galles.

=== First Republic ===
After several years at sea without a break, his health was badly affected and he had to return to his family to rest. He was elected procurator of Courthezon before being recalled to the navy on the outbreak of the War of the First Coalition. On 5 January 1793 he was made a major général in the squadron defending Belle-Île-en-Mer and Groix from attack by Howe's fleet. Heavily depleted, his crews mutinied under the pretext of sailing to Brest to save the port from the same royalist influence as had allowed the British to take Toulon. This was especially dangerous since his squadron was facing the enemy and so Daugier and his admiral met on one of the mutineers' ships, haranguing the crews and bringing order.

The Committee of Public Safety believed Daugier had to be demoted for encouraging popular fanaticism, but he was not out of work long. In March 1795 he was made capitaine de vaisseau and put in command of the frigate Proserpine, in which he fought the British off the Brittany coast under Villaret de Joyeuse. He took part in the battles of 29 prairial and 5 messidor with this ship before being ordered to Paris to report to the government. Some time later he was put in command of the Nantes and Rochefort convoys, totaling 64 ships. During that command he used his force of four frigates to attack a British force of three frigates and one ship of the line entering the Audierne Bay to give the convoy time to flee into the bay. He then commanded the Fougeux then the Cocarde in the Irish expedition in 1796. In 1797 he took command of the Jupiter and took part in Bruix' expedition of 1799.

=== Napoleonic Wars ===
In 1800 he was put in command of Rochefort, then of Lorient in 1801 after being made a member of the Tribunat. He supervised the training of the invasion fleet at Boulogne, before taking part in several battles against the British at Le Havre in June 1804. In reward for his services, Napoleon made him a member of the Legion d'Honneur on 1st frimaire year XII, a commander 2nd class on the following 2nd prairial, elector for the Vaucluse department, the first commander of the Sailors of the Imperial Guard and commander of the four main corps of the invasion flotilla at Boulogne.

In June 1806 he set off to reconnoitre the Adriatic coast. He also took part in the Prussian and Polish campaigns and commanded 106 men from the Sailors of the Imperial Guard at the battle of Jena. On returning to Paris, he learned that the Sailors posted to the invasion flotilla had been transferred to the Siege of Danzig. He joined them there and after also assisting at the siege of Stralsund and the attack on the island of Rügen Daugier was summoned to Spain to join the force intended for the invasion of Spain.

When the popular revolt broke out in Madrid on 2 May 1808, Daugier and the Sailors received ordered to join Dupont's corps in Andalucía. Daugier had his horse killed under him at Baylen the following 19 July. Describing Baylen, general Foy stated that Daugier and his force of Sailors "were only 300 men, but 300 men whom fear could not make flinch". After the 1809 convention of Andujar, Daugier returned to France to request retirement but could only get temporary leave from Napoleon. He was then made naval prefect of Lorient and was publicly told by Napoleon in the salle des maréchaux "I know how enemy generals praise you and the men of iron you command. This praise from an enemy is as good as another, monsieur Daugier."

=== Bourbon Restoration ===
On Napoleon's fall in 1814, Louis XVIII made Daugier a contre-amiral, a count and a knight of the Order of Saint Louis. After the Hundred Days, Daugier was made naval prefect of Lorient in 1814, of Rochefort in 1817 and finally of Toulon. He was also made a commander of the Order of Saint Louis on 21 October 1818, then a grand officer of the Légion d'honneur on 28 April 1821. He was elected deputy for Morbihan department in 1815 and defended naval interests in that role as well as gaining preferment for those whose careers had declined in the final years of the First Empire.

In 1817 Daugier was elected deputy for Finistère, where he had been president of the electoral college. In the 1817-1818 session he voted with the minority but was still recognized by the ministry as candidate for Vaucluse, which he represented from 1819 to 1827. From the 1819 election onwards he supported the ministry. When Camille Jordan presented an important amendment on 29 June 1820 during the discussion on the electoral law, Daugier and five or six of his colleagues defected, meaning the amendment was rejected.

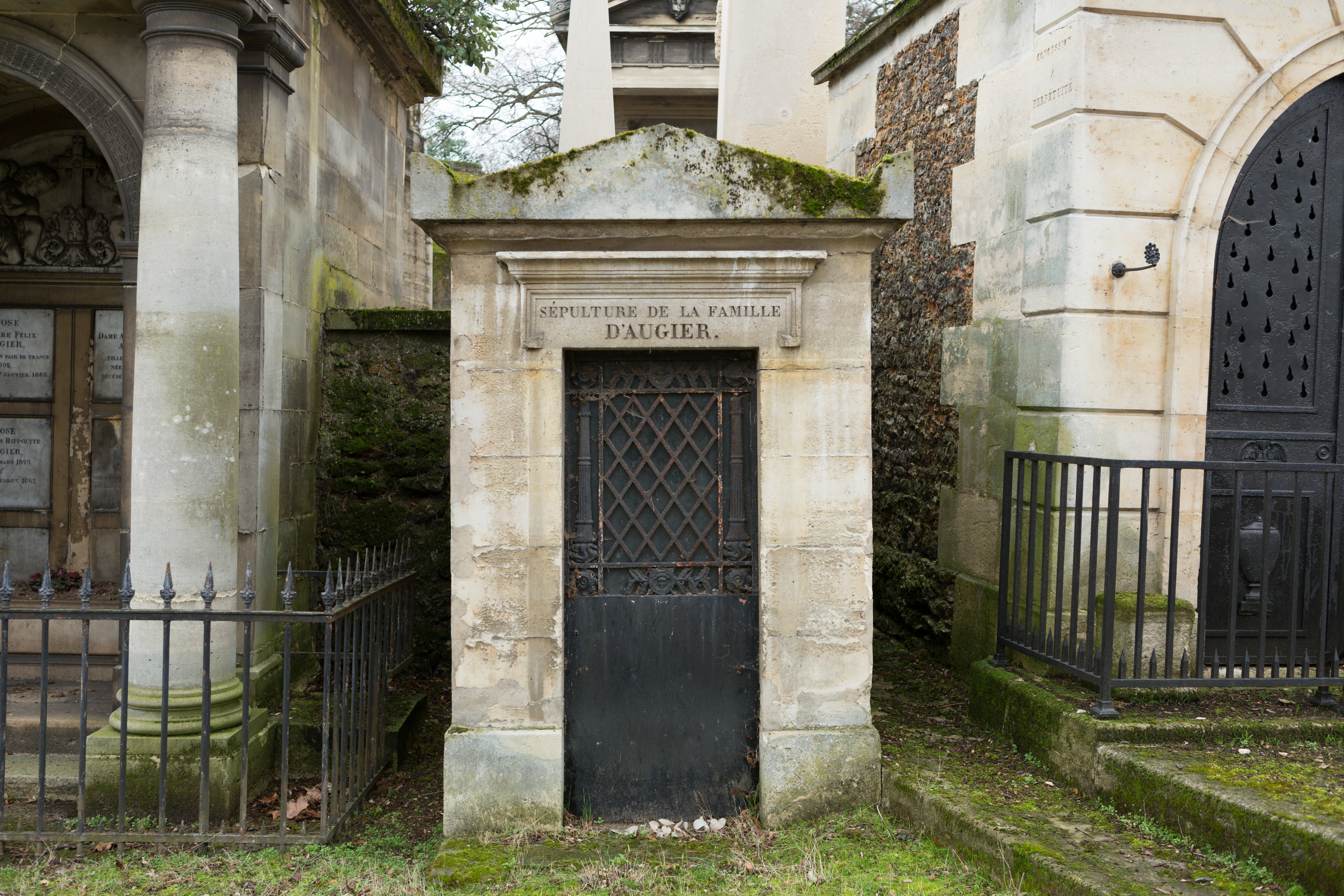
Daugier's tomb in the cimetière du Père-Lachaise.

In 1821 he was made Conseiller d'État and director of naval personnel. Soon afterwards he was put in command of the Toulon fleet and on 20 August 1823 he was made grand cross of the Order of Saint Louis. In 1825 he was promoted to vice admiral, on 7 January 1827 he was made a member of the Conseil d'amirauté (Admiralty Council) and in November 1827 he was elected deputy for Avignon. On 12 November 1828 he was made an extraordinary conseiller d'état. His legislative career ended in 1830 with the dissolution of the Chamber of Deputies by the Polignac ministry and he was placed on the reserve list on 1 March 1831. Daugier died on 12 April 1834 in Paris, aged 69. He is buried in the 38th division of the cimetière du Père-Lachaise

== Marriage and issue ==
Daugier was married to Marie-Gabrielle-Caroline-Jacqueline Le Dall de Kéréon. They had one son, Eugène-Yves-Constant, who died unmarried in 1837.

== Sources ==
- Biography page - Assemblée nationale.

== Bibliography ==
- Adolphe Robert et Gaston Cougny, Dictionnaire des Parlementaires français, Paris, Dourloton, 1889
- Étienne Taillemite, Dictionnaire des marins français, Paris, Tallandier, 2002 (ISBN 2-84734-008-4)
- http://www.culture.gouv.fr/public/mistral/leonore_fr?ACTION=CHERCHER&FIELD_1=COTE&VALUE_1=LH%2F74%2F92
