= Alcolea de Tajo =

Coordinates: 39°48′N 5°09′W

- municipality
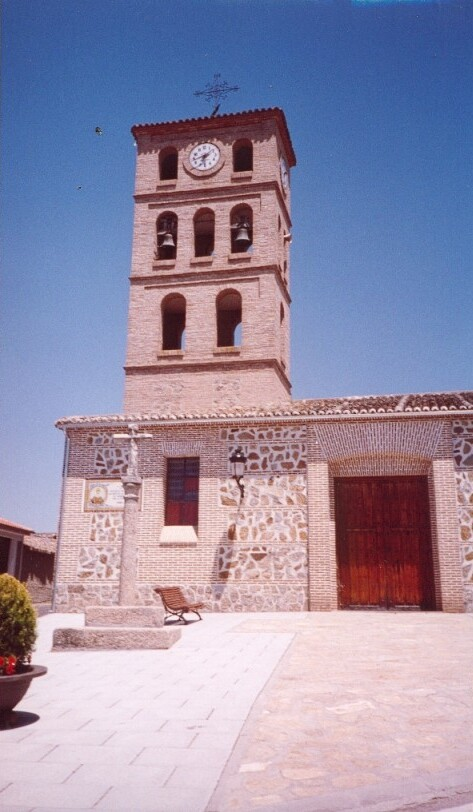

- Coat of arms

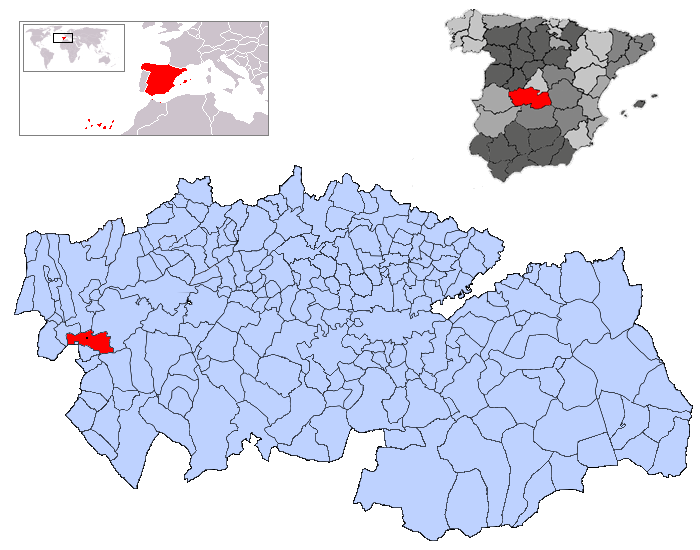
- Country: Spain
- Autonomous community: Castile-La Mancha
- Province: Toledo

Area
  - Total: 61.49 km^{2} (23.74 sq mi)
- Elevation: 340 m (1,120 ft)

Population (2025-01-01)
  - Total: 839
  - Density: 13.6/km^{2} (35.3/sq mi)
- Time zone: UTC+1 (CET)
  - Summer (DST): UTC+2 (CEST)

Alcolea de Tajo is a municipality located in the province of Toledo, Castile-La Mancha, Spain.

According to the 2006 census (INE), the municipality had a population of 843 inhabitants.

== Demographics ==
Historical population
Year	Pop.	±%
1900	636	—
1910	735	+15.6%
1920	715	−2.7%
1930	782	+9.4%
1940	935	+19.6%
1950	1,143	+22.2%
1960	1,210	+5.9%
1970	1,201	−0.7%
1981	866	−27.9%
1991	793	−8.4%
2001	772	−2.6%
2011	904	+17.1%
2021	843	−6.7%
2023	839	−0.5%
Source:INE
