= Alcolea (Córdoba) =

Coordinates: 37.932°N 4.673°W

Alcolea is a town near Córdoba, Spain. The town is significant for its 19-arch bridge, built between 1785 and 1792, crossing the Guadalquivir, and which was the site of two battles in the 19th century.

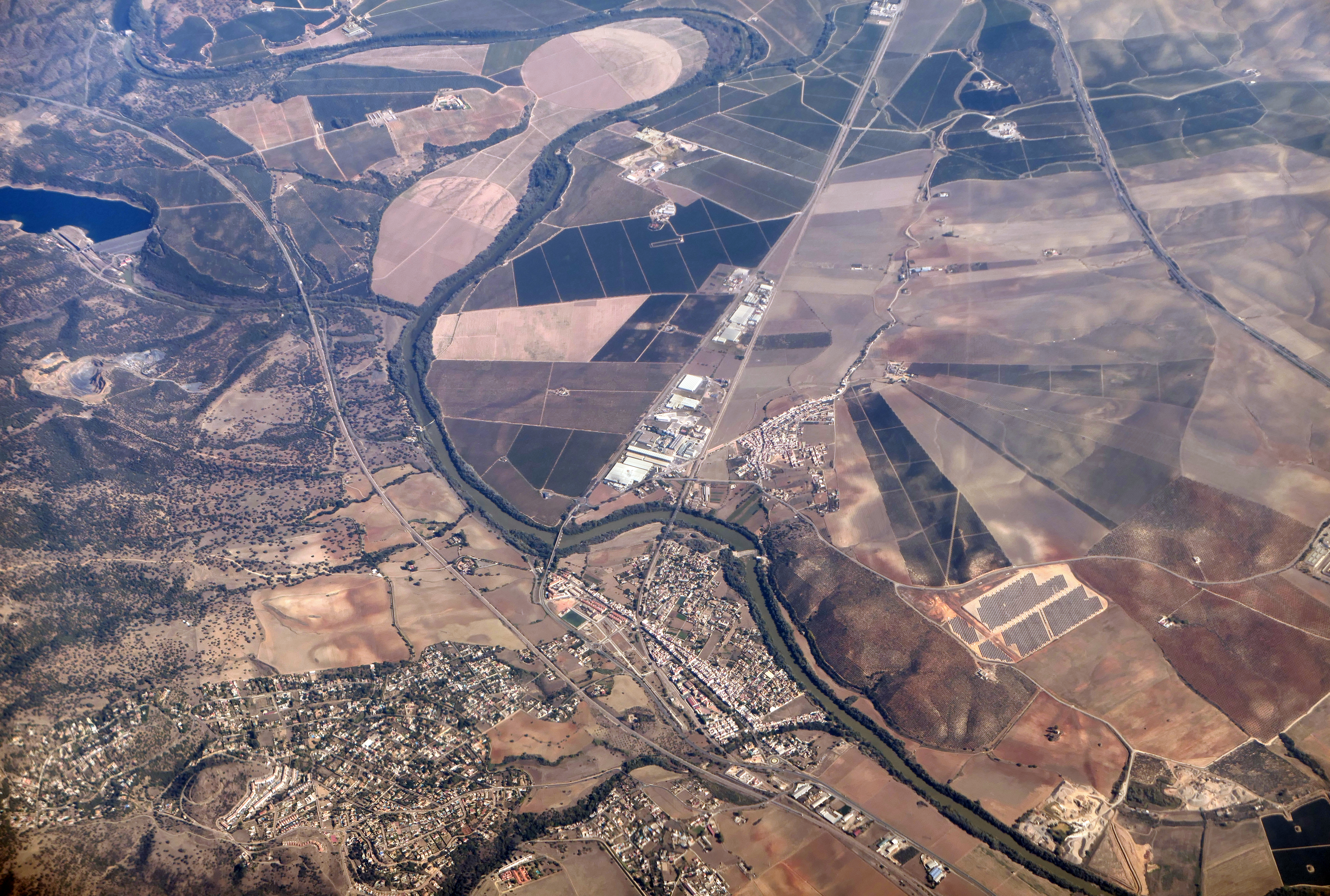
Aerial view of Alcolea and the surrounding countryside.

== History ==
Two battles were waged at the bridge in the 19th century:

- Battle of Alcolea Bridge (1808)
- Battle of Alcolea (1868)
