= Conseil d'amirauté =

French military committee

The Conseil d'amirauté (Admiralty Council) was a deliberative committee within the Ministry for the Navy and the colonies of France. It was set up in 1824 and suppressed in 1889.

== Sources ==
- Auguste Jal, Glossaire nautique : Répertoire polyglotte de termes de marine, 1848, volume 1, p. 119.
- Alfred Blanche, Dictionnaire général d'administration, Paris, 1860, p. 278-280.
