= Battle of Alcolea Bridge =

1808 battle during the Peninsular War

- Part of the Peninsular War
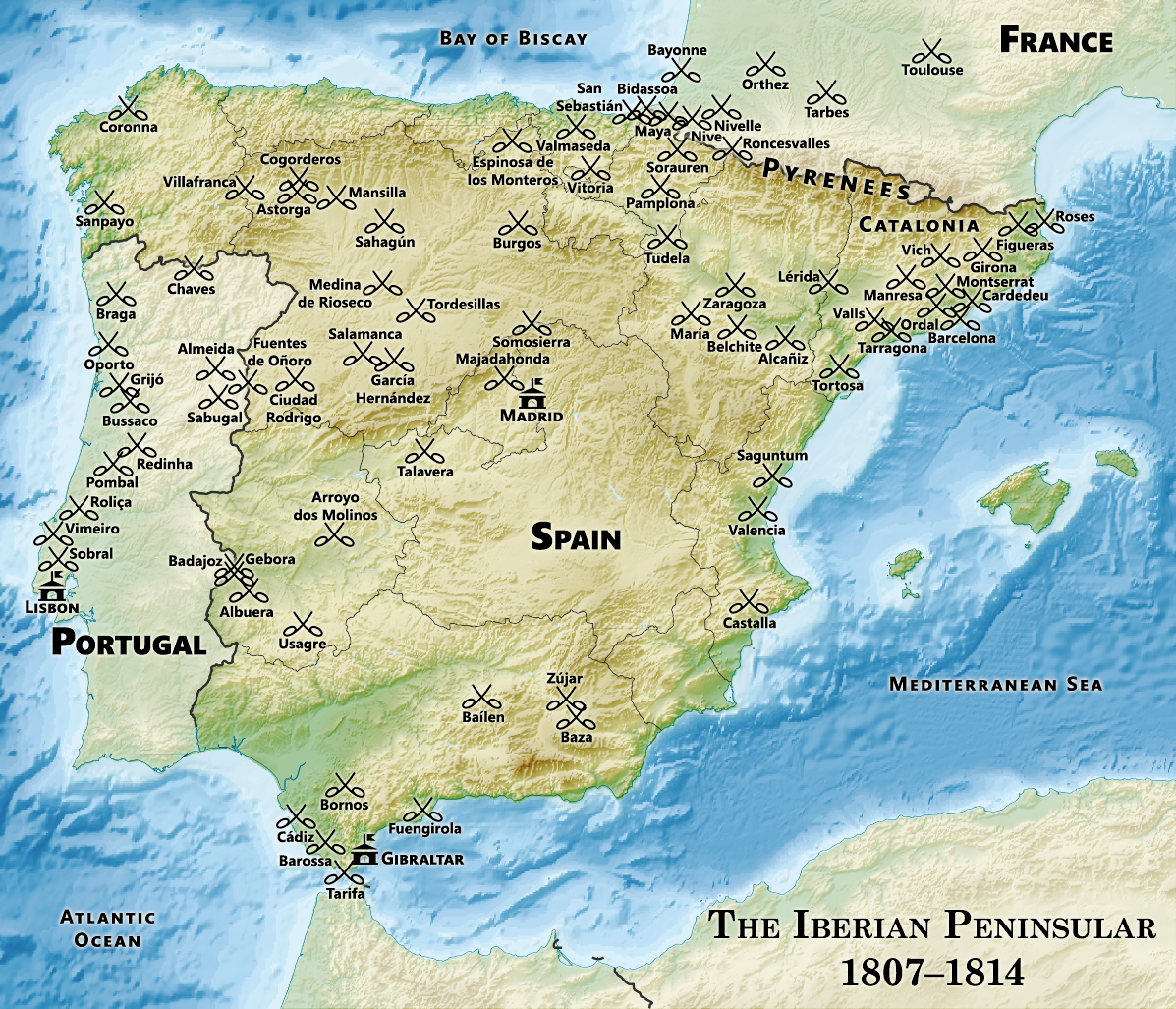
- Battle of Alcolea Bridge (Spain)
Date	7 June 1808
Location	Alcolea, near Córdoba, Spain 37.932°N 4.673°W
Result	French victory

Belligerents
First French Empire	Spain

Commanders and leaders
Pierre Dupont	Pedro Echávarri

Strength
18,000	3,000

Casualties and losses
Unknown	Unknown

Peninsular War: Spanish uprising 1808
current battle

The Battle of Alcolea Bridge was a minor battle that took place on 7 June 1808, during the Peninsular War, at Alcolea, a small village 10 km from Córdoba, the city that would be invaded by French troops later that same afternoon.

== Background ==
The Dos de Mayo Uprising had put Iberia in revolt against French rule.

== Battle ==
It is significant in that it was the first staged battle against regular Spanish troops that General Pierre Dupont de l'Étang fought in Andalusia after having left Toledo on 24 May, heading for Cádiz, with 25,000 troops. Although successive movements of French troops would be harried by Spanish guerrilleros fighting along the way, on both sides of the Sierra Morena and in the steep gorge (defile) of Despeñaperros that separates Castile-La Mancha (including Madrid) and Andalusia, Dupont met with no resistance there.

At Alcolea, some 3,000 regular troops, accompanied by some armed civilians, tried, unsuccessfully, to stop Dupont's vastly superior forces at the bridge over the Guadalquivir and were forced to retreat to Córdoba. Dupont went on to capture Córdoba that same day, his troops ransacking the city over four days.

Capitaine de vaisseau Daugier, commanding the battalion of Sailors of the Imperial Guard, is made to defend the bridge shortly after the initial battle. The Swiss-Spanish troops under Daugier's command would hold the bridgehead after its repair by the Sailors of the Imperial Guard, while said sailors would continue to the rear village of Arcolea, wiping out the scattered guerillas that still remained in the village. No losses were taken by the Sailors of the Guard in this battle.

One of the Spanish soldiers who fought at Alcolea was Pedro Agustín Girón, who would later become a minister of war, and who would also accuse General Echávarri of not having personally participated.

== Aftermath ==
Iberia in revolt proceeded with the Capture of the Rosily Squadron.

== See also ==
- Battle of Bailén
- Timeline of the Peninsular War
- Uprising of Santa Cruz de Mudela
- Uprising of Valdepeñas
