= Jean-Baptiste Grivel =

French naval officer and naval writer

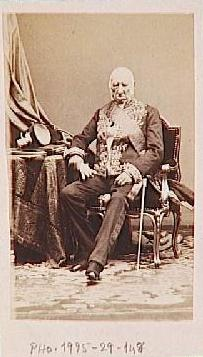
Jean-Baptiste Grivel (1778–1869) assis

Jean-Baptiste Grivel (29 August 1778 – 10 September 1869) was a rear admiral in the French Navy and naval writer. His son, Baron Louis Antoine Richild Grivel (1827–1882), also rose to the rank of vice admiral. In 1832, he published Considerations navales en reponse a la brochure de Monsiuer de Pradt, one of the earliest writers to attempt to grasp the overall concept of maritime power.
