= Haitian independence debt =

Payments by Haiti to France in compensation for property lost in the Haitian Revolution

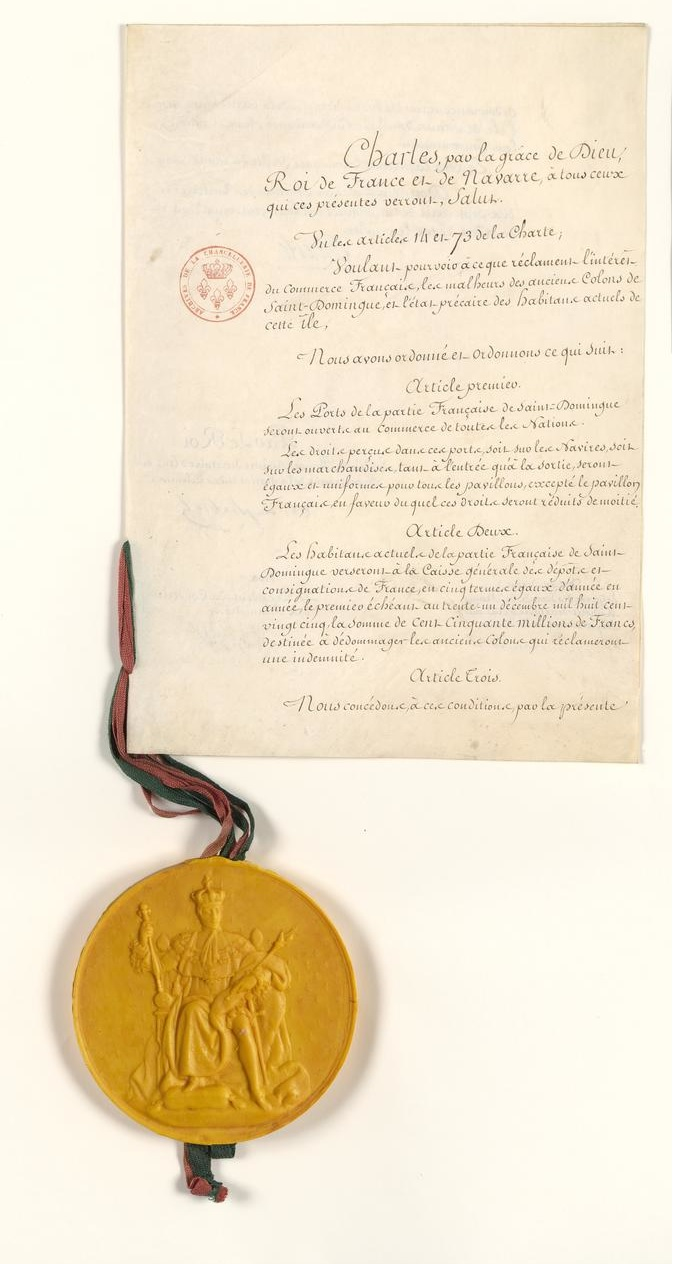
First page of the Royal Ordinance of Charles X (1825), by which France recognizes the independence of Haiti in exchange for the payment of an indemnity of 150 million francs.

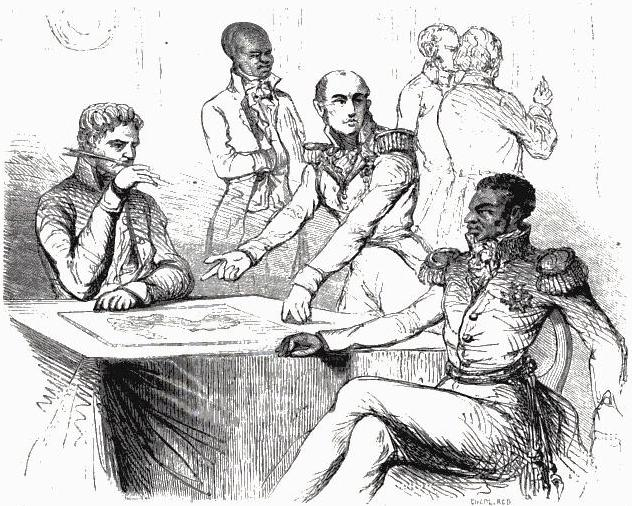
The Baron de Mackau of France presenting demands to Jean-Pierre Boyer, President of Haiti, in 1825

The Haitian independence debt (French: Dette d'Indépendance Haïtienne) involves an 1825 agreement between Haiti and France that included France demanding an indemnity of 150 million francs in five annual payments of 30 million to be paid by Haiti in claims over property, including Haitian slaves, that was lost through the Haitian Revolution in return for diplomatic recognition. Haiti was forced to take a loan for the first 30 million, (Note: According to NYT, 30 million francs was about six times that of the Haitian income that year.) and in 1838 France agreed to reduce the remaining debt to 60 million to be paid over 30 years, with the final payment paid in 1883. (Note: The New York Times states it was 1888.) However, according to a 2022 The New York Times analysis, because of other loans taken to pay off this loan, the final payment to debtors was actually made in 1947. They approximated that 112 million francs was actually paid in indemnity, which is equivalent to $560 million in 2022 after adjusting for inflation.

Restoration France's demand of payments in exchange for recognizing Haiti's independence was delivered to the country by several French warships in 1825, twenty-one years after Haiti's declaration of independence in 1804. Despite several revolutions in France after that date (July Revolution, French Revolution of 1848, Paris Commune), successive governments, be they imperial, monarchist or republican, continued enforcing the debt and coercing Haiti to pay. (Note: France itself had defaulted on two thirds of its debt in 1797 (Consolidated Third) as a consequence of the French Revolution of 1789 which was caused in part by a sovereign debt crisis and in turn was one of many causative factors leading to the Haitian Revolution.) Haiti had to take a loan in 1875 to pay back the final portion of the original loan, and the bank that benefited most from this was Crédit Industriel et Commercial. Even after the indemnity was paid, Haiti had to continue paying the other loans, and the government of the United States funded the acquisition of Haiti's treasury in 1911, and in 1922, the rest of Haiti's debt was moved to be paid to American investors.

A 2022 The New York Times article stated that it took until 1947 for Haiti to finally pay off all the associated interest to the National City Bank of New York (now Citibank). In 2016, the Parliament of France repealed the 1825 ordinance of Charles X, though no reparations have been offered by France. These debts have been denounced by some historians and activists as responsible for Haiti's poverty today and a case of odious debt.

== History ==
=== Saint-Domingue colony ===
Map of the French colony of Saint-Domingue in 1777. To the east is the Captaincy General of Santo Domingo. The border dividing the island on the map is the one agreed to in the Treaty of Aranjuez of 1777. At first, the entire island of Hispaniola belonged to Spain, but the French managed to seize the western part of the island thanks to the Devastations of Osorio (1605–1606).

Saint-Domingue, now Haiti, was the most profitable and productive European colony in the world going into the 1800s. France acquired much of its wealth by using slaves, with the slave population of Saint-Domingue alone accounting for forty percent of the entire Atlantic slave trade by the 1780s. Between the years of 1697 and 1804, French colonists brought 800,000 West African slaves to what was then known as Saint-Domingue to work on the vast plantations. The Saint-Domingue population reached 520,000 in 1790, and of those 425,000 were slaves. The mortality rate among slaves was high, with the French often working slaves to death and transporting more to the colony instead of providing necessities as it was cheaper. At the time, goods from Haiti comprised thirty percent of French colonial trade while its sugar represented forty percent of the Atlantic market. By the 1770s, more than sixty percent of the coffee consumed in Europe came from the French West Indies, primarily from Saint-Domingue.

=== Independent Haiti and the rejection of the international community ===
Haiti's legacy of debt began shortly after a widespread slave revolt against the French, with Haitians gaining their independence from France in 1804, followed by the 1804 massacre of much of the remaining European population of Haiti. Jean-Jacques Dessalines, Governor-General of Haiti, ordered the execution of remaining whites; in response, Thomas Jefferson, United States President, feared a slave revolt would spread to the United States, ceased the aid that was initiated by his predecessor John Adams and sought the international isolation of Haiti.

"An army of black troops might conquer all the British Isles and put in jeopardy our Southern states."

— Timothy Pickering, 3rd U.S. Secretary of State.

The news of the new Haitian state was thus received with great fear and rejection by the countries and colonial powers of the region, since all of these countries were slaveholding nations and were nervous that their slaves might follow the Haitian example. The Haitian diplomat and politician, Jacques Nicolas Léger, wrote that even Simón Bolívar ignored Haiti when he called the Congress of Panama for fear of offending the United States.

After the declaration of independence, no state was willing to trade with Haiti, which led Haiti's first president Alexandre Pétion to suggest paying an indemnification to France, solely for the value of lost real estate, in order to see the de facto embargo lifted. Nevertheless, the French calculation of the indemnification (made in 1825 and confirmed in 1826) was based on articles 44 and 48 of the Code Noir, which established that the enslaved labourers on an estate in the preceding 30 years constituted 30–60 percent of the property value.

Haiti had hoped that the United Kingdom would support their recognition due to Britain's strained relationship with France, even providing British merchants lower import duties in 1825. However, during the 1814–1815 Congress of Vienna, which Britain was a party to, the French inserted a secret clause during the negotiations allowing them to by "whatever means possible, including that of arms... recover Saint-Domingue or to bring the population of that colony to order". In 1823, Britain recognized the independence of Colombia, Mexico and other nations in the Americas while continuing to refuse recognition to Haiti, leading to the Haitian government abolishing the lower import duties granted to British merchants. Haiti was unable to count on the United States as a potential ally; despite their anti-colonial assertion in the Monroe Doctrine of 1823, the American government refused to recognize Haiti, largely due to opposition by Southern slaveowners. The first American ambassador to Haiti – and with it recognition of Haiti's independence – only came in 1862, a year after the Southern politicians who had blocked such a move had left Congress after declaring secession.

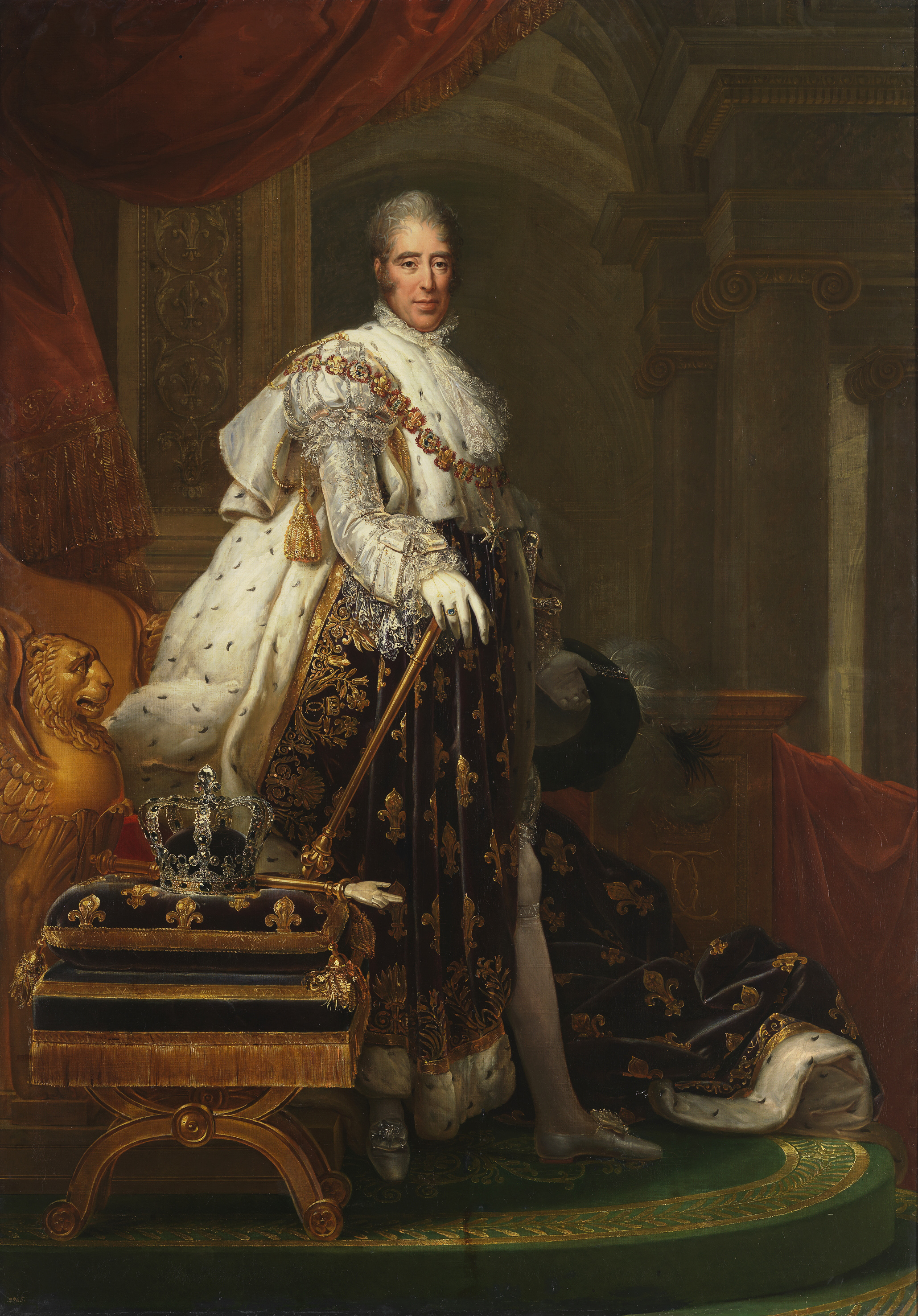
Coronation Portrait of Charles X by François Gérard, 1825. The King of France Charles X demanded debt repayment for freed slaves

Until France recognized Haiti's independence, the fear of reconquest and continued isolation persisted among Haitians. Haiti was also financially strained after purchasing equipment to defend itself from invasion. Knowing that improvements could not happen until Haiti received international recognition, President of Haiti Jean-Pierre Boyer sent envoys to negotiate terms with France. At one meeting in Brussels on 16 August 1823, Haiti proposed waiving all import duties for five years on French products and then duties would be halved at the end of the period; France refused the offer outright. By 1824, President Boyer began to prepare Haiti for a defensive war, moving armaments inland to provide increased protection. After being summoned by France, two Haitian envoys traveled to Paris. At the meetings held between June and August 1824, Haiti offered to pay an indemnity to France, though negotiations ended after France said it would only recognize their former territory on the west half of Hispaniola and that it sought to maintain control of Haiti's foreign relations.

== Ordinance of Charles X ==
As a show of force, captain Ange René Armand, baron de Mackau, in the ship La Circe, along with two men-of-war, arrived at Port-au-Prince on 3 July 1825. Soon after, more warships led by admirals Pierre Roch Jurien de La Gravière and Grivel arrived at Haiti. A total of fourteen French warships equipped with 528 cannons presented demands that Haiti compensate France for its loss of slaves and the 1804 Haiti massacre.

The following ordinance of Charles X, King of France (1824–1830), was presented:

"Charles, by the grace of God, King of France and Navarre.

"To everyone here present, Greetings.

"Having seen articles 14 (Note: The King is the Supreme Head of the State, commands the land and sea forces, declares war, makes treaties of peace, alliance and commerce, appoints to all places of public administration, and makes the necessary regulations and ordinances for the execution of the laws and the security of the state.) and 73 (Note: The colonies will be governed by special laws and regulations) of the Charter

"Wishing to attend to the interest of French Commerce, to the misfortunes of the former colonists of Saint-Domingue and to the precarious condition of the present inhabitants of the island;

"We have ordered and order the following:

"Art. I. The ports of the French part of Saint-Domingue shall be open to the commerce of all nations.

"The duties levied in these ports either on ships or merchandise at the times of their entry or departure shall be equal and uniform for all nations except for the French flag, on behalf of which these duties are to be reduced to half the amount.

"Art. II. The present inhabitants of the French part of Saint-Domingue shall pay at the Caisse des Dépots et Consignations of France, in five annual instalments, the first one due on 31 December 1825, the sum of one hundred and fifty millions of francs, in order to compensate the former colonists who may claim an indemnity.

"Art. III. Under these conditions we grant, by the present Ordinance, to the present inhabitants of the French part of Saint-Domingue the full independence of their Government.

"And the present Ordinance shall be sealed with the great seal.

"Done at Paris in the Palace of Tuileries, this 17 April A. D. 1825, and the first of our reign.

"Charles.
"By the King: The Peer of France, Minister-Secretary of State for the Navy and the colonies.
"Comte de Chabrol."

The Haitians wanted the French to recognize the Spanish part of the island as part of Haitian territory. However, the French flatly ignored this request. France had returned de jure the Spanish part of the island to Spain in the Treaty of Paris of 1814, which annulled the Treaty of Basel of 1795. Therefore, France had no claim to the formerly Spanish part of Hispaniola which it could renounce in favor of Haiti.

Under Charles X's ordinance, France demanded an indemnity payment of 150 million francs in exchange for recognizing Haiti's independence. In addition to the payment, Charles ordered that Haiti provide a fifty percent discount on French import duties, making payment to France more difficult. On 11 July 1825, the senate of Haiti signed the agreement to pay France.

== Territorial discussions ==
Map of the Island of Hispaniola divided by the border of the Treaty of Aranjuéz of 1777, which divided the island into a French and a Spanish part. France recognized the independence of its colony on the French part, under Article 8 of the Treaty of Paris of 1814, in which France returned the Spanish part of the island to Spain, thereby superseding the 1795 Treaty of Basel.

During the discussions, the Haitians demanded from France that the Spanish part of the island be recognized by France as the territory of Haiti in the aforementioned Ordinance. The French rejected this Haitian demand as inadmissible, ill-founded and lacking legal basis; France, they argued, had returned the Spanish part of the island to Spain in the Treaty of Paris of 1814, which annulled the Treaty of Basel of 1795. Therefore, this territory was not theirs to dispose of, therefore, the Haitians were occupying Spanish territory, not French.

Furthermore, the French were not going to reward Haiti by giving the Haitians a territory that did not belong to France, when the Haitians made France lose its most profitable colony, Saint-Domingue, in the first place. The French-Spanish relations which had been tense during the Trienio Liberal (1820–1823) had markedly improved following the imposition by force of an absolutist regime under Ferdinand VII which was Bourbon, Legitimist and Absolutist, very much like Charles X. Whatever the political expediency might have been (and there seemed to be none), Charles X was not of a disposition to reward a revolutionary Republic at the expense of a regime he viewed very much as kindred.

The Haitians alleged that they were militarily occupying the territory of an independent state, the Republic of Spanish Haiti, free of any power, and that its president and founder José Núñez de Cáceres had recognized the Haitian occupation. The French rejected this claim of the Haitians, since the Republic of Spanish Haiti was just an attempt at a state that existed only for two months and a few days, and that never received official diplomatic recognition, neither of its metropolis, nor of any other country besides Haiti.

Furthermore, France and other major powers had not yet (as of 1822) recognized Haiti as an independent nation, therefore, the French argued, the colony of one country could not recognize the sovereignty of the colony of another.

At the same time, the Haitians wanted France to force the Dominicans to pay the Haitian Independence Debt, and to also collect local taxes from them, so that they would contribute to the payment of this debt. The French rejected this claim by the Haitians. France did not have to collect compensation from the inhabitants of the Spanish part since they had not created any loss for France that had to be compensated. Furthermore, the French never created slave plantations on the Spanish part of the island when it was under French control.

== Indemnity payment ==
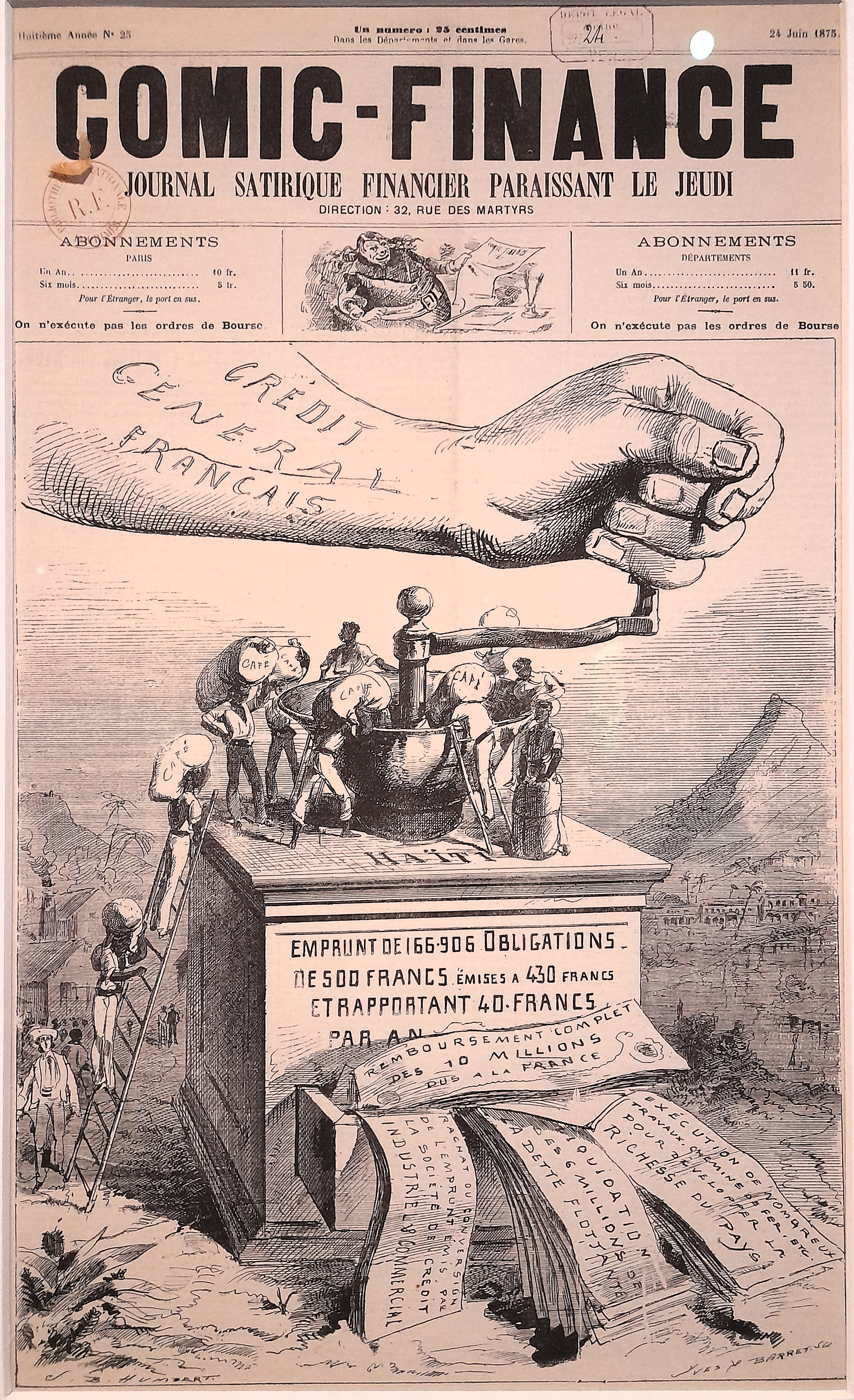
A front page from the satirical financial newspaper Comic-Finance, dated June 24, 1875, illustrates the consequences of the 1875 loan taken out by Haiti to finance the final repayments of the 1825 indemnity. Haiti's national wealth, based on coffee production, is shown here being ground up and transformed into bank securities.

The payments were designed by France to be so large that it would effectively create a "double debt"; France would receive a direct annual payment and Haiti would pay French bankers interest on the loans required to meet France's annual demands. France viewed Haiti's debt as the "principal interest in Haiti, the question that dominated everything else for us", according to a French minister. Much of the debt would be paid directly to the French state-owned Caisse des dépôts et consignations (CDC). France ordered Haiti to pay the 150 million francs over a period of five years, with the first annual payment of 30 million francs being six times larger than Haiti's yearly revenue. Haiti was obliged to take out a loan from the French bank Ternaux Gandolphe et Cie to make the payment. Ternaux Gandolphe et Cie in turn organized a bond auction to raise the sum. A consortium led by Jacques Laffitte agreed to pay 800 francs for each of the 30,000 thousand-franc bonds to the CDC. Of the 24 million that the Laffitte consortium paid to the CDC, 20 million had itself been borrowed at 3 percent interest from the CDC. In 1826, Haiti shipped the contents of its treasury to France in bags to make up the remaining 6 million francs.

Haiti continued to take out loans from France and the United States in order to fulfill payments. Such large payments became impossible for Haiti and defaults occurred immediately, with Haiti's late payments often raising tensions with France. Ternaux Gandolphe et Cie seized assets of the Haitian government for failing to pay on its loan, though the Tribunal de la Seine overturned these actions on 2 May 1828. On 12 February 1838, France agreed to reduce the debt to 90 million francs to be paid over a period of 30 years to compensate former plantation owners who had lost their property and slaves; the 2004 equivalent of US$21 billion. President Boyer, who agreed to make the payments to prevent an invasion, was forced from Haiti in 1843 by citizens who demanded lower taxes and more rights.

By the late 1800s, eighty percent of Haiti's wealth was being used to pay foreign debt; France was the highest collector, followed by the German Empire and the United States. Henri Durrieu, head of the French bank Crédit Industriel et Commercial (CIC), was inspired to increase revenue for the bank by following the example of state-run banks acquiring capital from other distant French colonies such as Martinique and Senegal. In 1874 and 1875 Haiti took out two large loans from CIC, greatly increasing the nation's debt. French banks charged Haiti 40% of the capital in commissions and fees. Thomas Piketty described the loans as an early example of "neocolonialism through debt".

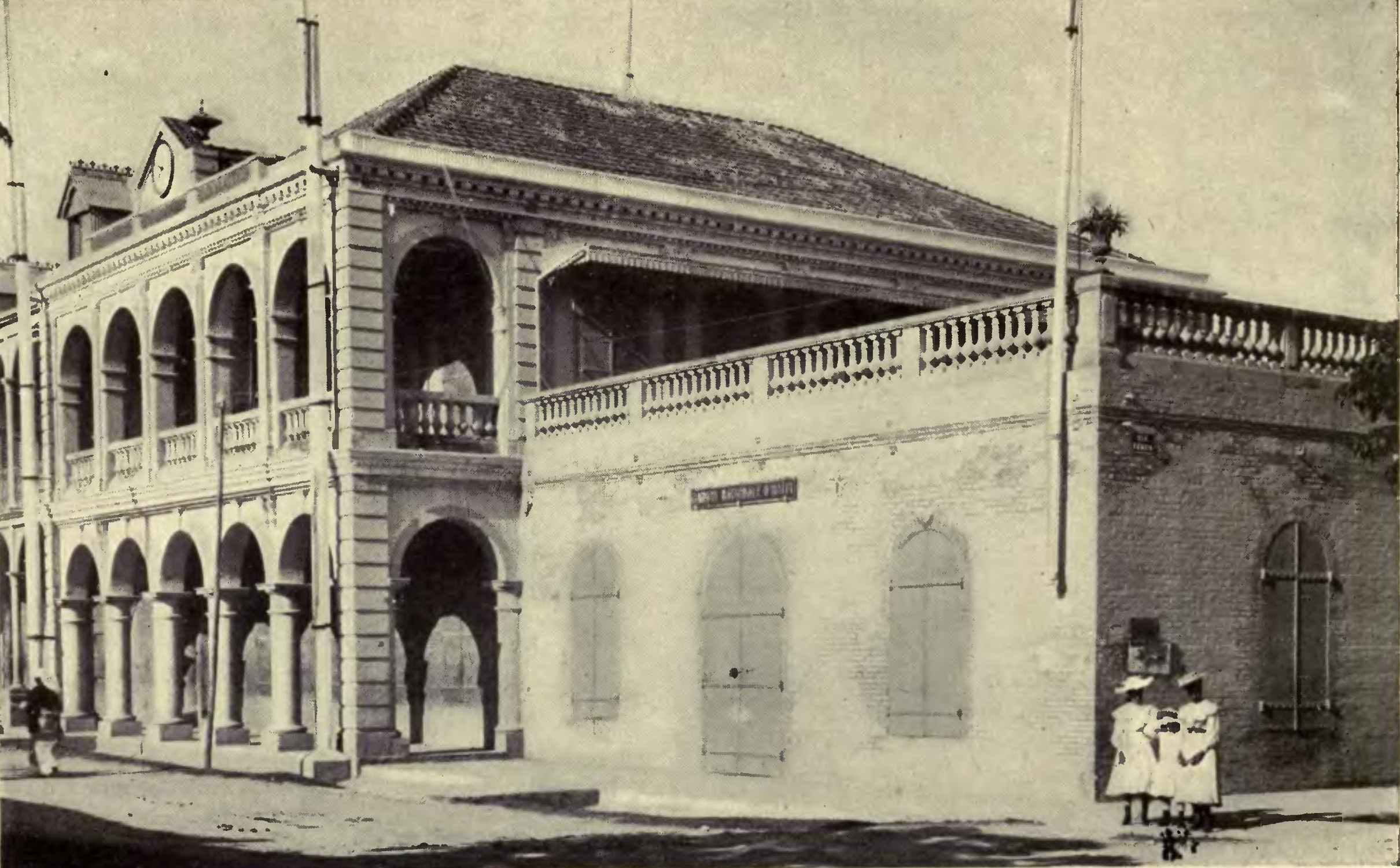
The National Bank of Haiti (BNH) building in Port-au-Prince, 1907

From 1880 to 1881, Haiti granted a currency issuance concession to create the National Bank of Haiti (BNH), headquartered in Paris by CIC which was simultaneously funding the construction of the Eiffel Tower. BNH was described as an entity of "pure extraction" by Paris School of Economics economic historian Éric Monnet. On the board of the BNH was Édouard Delessert, the great-grandson of French slave trader and owner Jean-Joseph de Laborde who established himself when France controlled Haiti. Haitian Charles Laforestrie, who mainly lived in France and successfully pushed for Haiti to accept the 1875 loan with the CIC, later retired from his positions in Haiti amid corruption allegations, joining the BNH board in Paris after its founding. CIC took $136 million in 2022 US dollars from Haiti and distributed those funds among shareholders, who made 15% annual returns on average, not returning any of the earnings to Haiti. These funds distributed among shareholders ultimately deprived Haiti of at least $1.7 billion that could have been put towards infrastructural development. Under the French-controlled BNH, Haitian funds were overseen by France and all transactions generated commissions, with CIC shareholders profits often being larger than the entire budget for Haiti's public works. The French government acknowledged the payment of 90 million francs in 1888 and over a period of about seventy years, Haiti paid 112 million francs to France, about $560 million in 2022.

=== United States occupation of Haiti ===
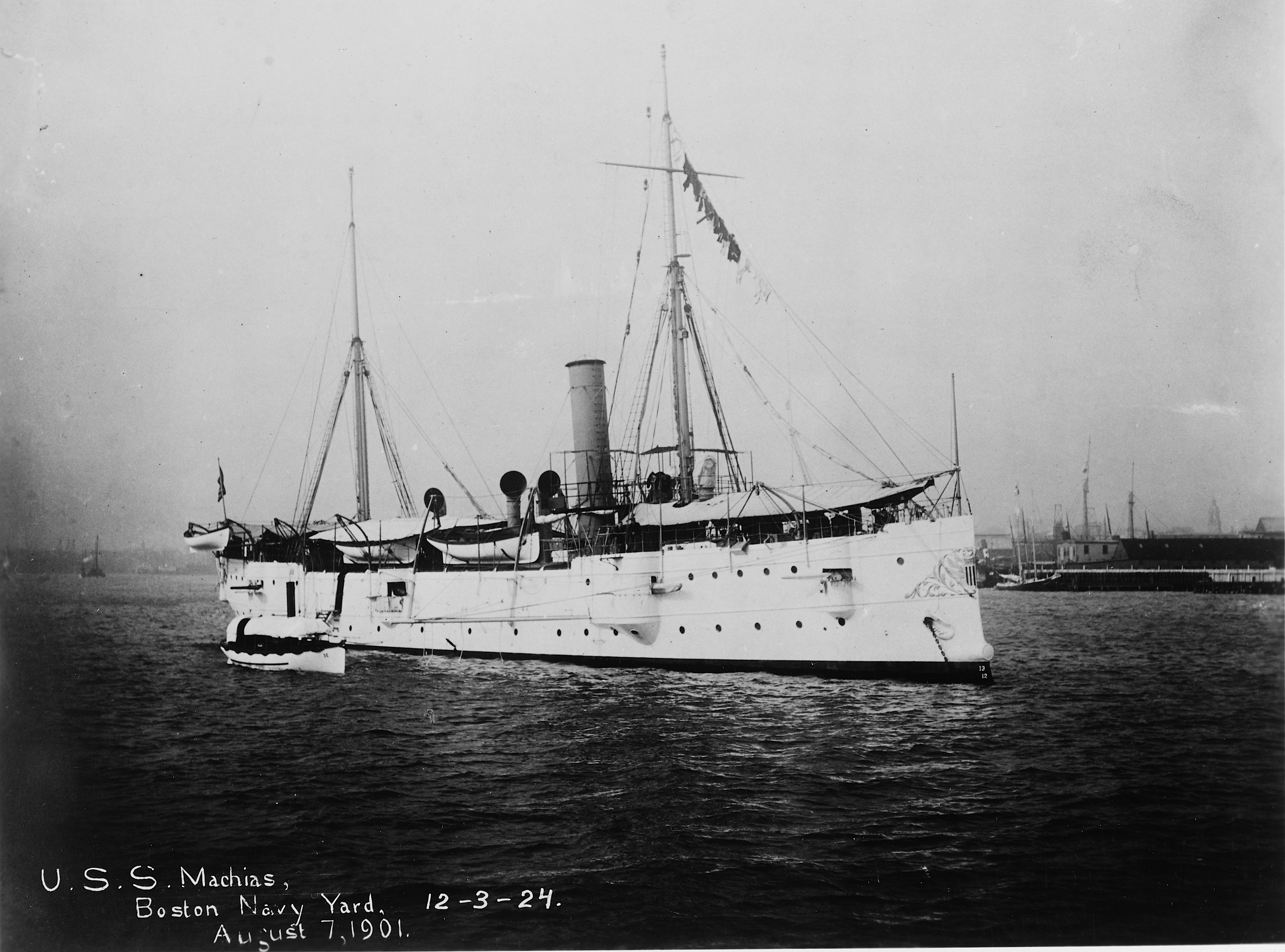
USS Machias, which transported Haiti's gold to New York City to be placed in 55 Wall Street.

In 1903, Haitian authorities began to accuse the BNH of fraud and by 1908, Haitian Minister of Finance Frédéric Marcelin pushed for the BNH to work on the behalf of Haitians, though French officials began to devise plans to reorganize their financial interests. French envoy to Haiti Pierre Carteron wrote following Marcelin's objections that "It is of the highest importance that we study how to set up a new French credit establishment in Port-au-Prince ... Without any close link to the Haitian government." Businesses from the United States had pursued the control of Haiti for years and from 1910 to 1911, the United States Department of State backed a consortium of American investors – headed by the National City Bank of New York – to acquire control of the National Bank of Haiti to create the Bank of the Republic of Haiti (BNRH), with the new bank often holding payments from the Haitian government, leading to unrest.

France would still keep a stake in the BNRH, though CIC was excluded. Following the overthrow of Haitian president Michel Oreste in 1914, the National City Bank and the BNRH demanded the United States Marines to take custody of Haiti's gold reserve of about US$500,000 – equivalent to $13,526,578 in 2021 – in December 1914; the gold was transported aboard USS Machias in wooden boxes and place into the National City Bank's New York City vault days later. The overthrow of Haiti's president Vilbrun Guillaume Sam and subsequent unrest resulted in President of the United States Woodrow Wilson ordering the invasion of Haiti to protect American business interests on 28 July 1915. Six weeks later, the United States seized control of Haiti's customs houses, administrative institutions, banks and the national treasury, with the United States using a total of forty percent of Haiti's national income to repay debts to American and French banks for the next nineteen years until 1934. In 1922, BNRH was completely acquired by National City Bank, its headquarters was moved to New York City and Haiti's debt to France was moved to be paid to American investors. Under U.S. government control, a total of forty percent of Haiti's national income was designated to repay debts to American and French banks. Haiti would pay its final indemnity remittance to National City Bank in 1947, with the United Nations reporting that at that time, Haitians were "often close to the starvation level".

== Aftermath ==
A 2022 analysis by The New York Times reported that the payments cost Haiti much of its development potential. They said that it may have removed between $21 to $115 billion of growth from Haiti over two centuries, according to calculations conducted by fifteen prominent economists. They noted that this number is roughly about one to eight times the nation's GDP in 2022. (Note: For comparison, Haiti's nominal GDP in 2020 stood at 14.508 billion USD.) The analysis noted that Haiti could potentially have experienced a level of development similar to neighboring Caribbean island nations that gained independence in the early 19th century, such as the Dominican Republic and Jamaica.

The history of Haiti's indemnity is not taught as part of education in France. Aristocratic French families have largely forgotten that their families benefited from the debt payments of Haiti. President of France François Hollande would eventually describe the money paid by Haiti to France as "the ransom of independence" and in 2016, the Parliament of France repealed the 1825 ordinance in a symbolic gesture.

In 2025, France created a commission to study the impact of the debt France imposed on Haiti.

=== Reparation requests ===
==== Aristide government ====
On 7 April 2003, President of Haiti Jean-Bertrand Aristide demanded that France pay Haiti over 21 billion U.S. dollars, what he said was the equivalent in today's money of the 90 million gold francs Haiti was forced to pay Paris after winning its freedom from France. French and Haitian officials later claimed to The New York Times that Aristide's calls for reparations led to French and Haitian officials collaborating with the United States on removing Aristide because France feared that discussions of reparations would set a precedent for other former colonies, such as Algeria.

In February 2004, a coup d'état occurred against President Aristide. The United Nations Security Council, of which France is a permanent member, rejected a 26 February 2004, appeal from the Caribbean Community (CARICOM) for international peacekeeping forces to be sent into its member state Haiti. However, the Security Council voted unanimously to send troops into Haiti three days later, just hours after Aristide's controversial resignation. The provisional prime minister Gérard Latortue who assumed office after the coup would later rescind the reparations demand, calling it "ridiculous" and "illegal".

Myrtha Desulme, chairperson of the Haiti-Jamaica Exchange Committee, told IPS, "I believe that [the call for reparations] could have something to do with it, because they [France] were definitely not happy about it, and made some very hostile comments ... I believe that he did have grounds for that demand, because that is what started the downfall of Haiti."

==== 2010 earthquake ====
Following the 2010 Haiti earthquake, the French foreign ministry made a formal request to the Paris Club on 17 January 2010 to completely cancel Haiti's external debt. A number of commentators, for example The New York Times' Matt Apuzzo, Selam Gebrekidan, Constant Méheut, and Catherine Porter, analyze how Haiti's current troubles stem from its colonial past, drawing references from the early 19th-century indemnity demand and how it had severely depleted the Haitian government's treasury and economic capabilities.

== Gallery ==
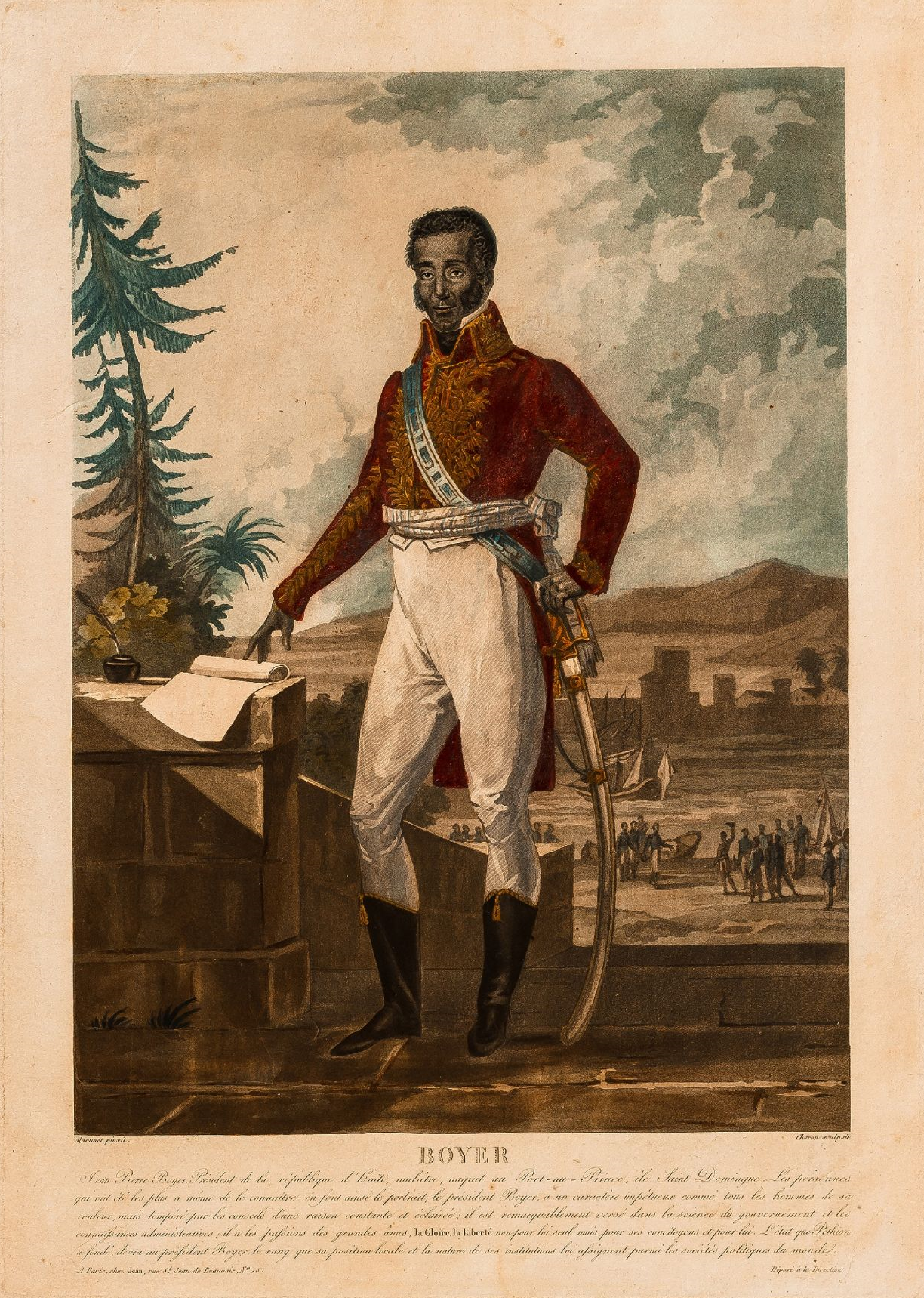
Engraving showing Haitian President Jean-Pierre Boyer with an inkwell, quill, and scroll in his right hand, ready to sign the ordinance. To the left of him, in the background, French sailors can be seen on the Port-au-Prince dock, making sure that the ordinance is signed.

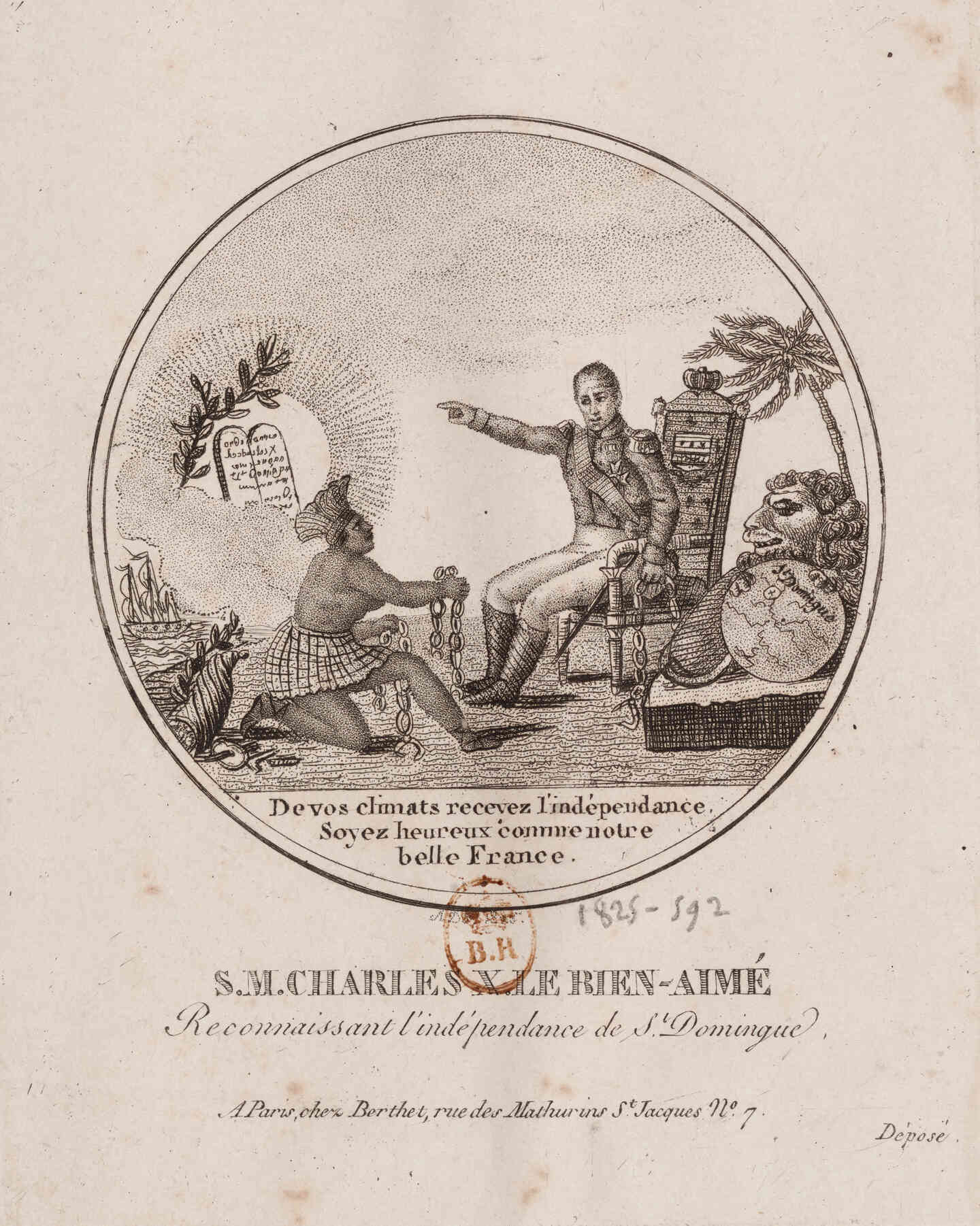
Engraving titledː
"His Majesty, Charles X, The Beloved, recognizing
the independence of Saint-Domingue".

== See also ==
- External debt of Haiti
- France–Haiti relations
- Foreign relations of Haiti
- Chilean independence debt
- Convention of London (1861)
- Devastations of Osorio
