= External debt of Haiti =

Money owed from Haiti to other countries and international institutions to repay loans

Sticker in Port-au-Prince demanding repayment from the French government

The external debt of Haiti (French: Dette Extérieure d'Haïti) is a notable and controversial national debt which mostly stems from an outstanding 1825 compensation to former slavers of the French colonial empire and later 20th century corruptions.

The French Revolutionary and Napoleonic Wars in Europe allowed rebel Haitian slaves to overpower French colonial rule and gain independence in the 1791–1804 Haitian Revolution. The restored French monarchy, supported by European monarchies, sent the 1825 French expedition to Haiti to demand, with military menace, massive compensations: Haiti had to repay the French government and former slaveholders $112 million French francs (more than $560 million in current U.S. dollars) for the loss of massively profitable slave-plantation assets and revenues. This price for independence was financed by French banks and the American Citibank, and finally paid off in 1947.

Later, the corrupt Duvalier dynasty added to the country's debts. The Duvaliers are believed to have used the money to expand their power and for their personal enrichment. In the early 21st century, and especially after the devastating 2010 Haiti earthquake, the World Bank and some other governments had planned to forgive the debt. Instead, remaining parts of Haiti's debt repayments were postponed. France forgave a more recent loan with a balance of US$77 million, but has refused to consider repaying the independence debt.

These debts are denounced as the root of contemporary Haiti's poverty and a case of odious debt, debt forced upon a population with abusive force. In 2022, The New York Times published a dedicated investigative series on that matter.

== List of debt ==
=== Independence debt ===
Haiti was the richest and most productive European colony in the world going into the 1800s. Haiti's legacy of debt began shortly after a widespread slave revolt against the French, with Haitians gaining their independence from France in 1804. President of the United States Thomas Jefferson – fearing that slaves gaining their independence would spread to the United States – stopped sending aid that began under his predecessor John Adams and pursued international isolation of Haiti during his tenure. France had also pursued a policy that prevented Haiti from participating in trade in the Atlantic. This isolation on the international stage made Haiti desperate for economic relief.

France, with warships at the ready, sailed to Haiti in 1825 and demanded Haiti to compensate France for its loss of slaves and its slave colony. In exchange for French recognition of Haiti as a sovereign republic, France demanded payment of 150 million francs. In addition to the payment, France required that Haiti provide a fifty percent discount on import duties paid by French merchant ships, making payment to France more difficult. In 1838, France agreed to reduce the debt to 90 million francs to be paid over a period of 30 years to compensate former plantation owners who had lost their property; the 2004 equivalent of US$21 billion. During the U.S. occupation of Haiti in 1915 to 1934, National City Bank (now Citibank) took control of the country's national bank and moved its holdings to New York. By acquiring Banque Nationale de la République d’Haïti (BNRH), Citibank became the recipient of Haiti's debt payments, rather than France. Historians have traced loan documents from the time of the 1825 Ordinance, through the various refinancing efforts, to the final remittance to Citibank in 1947.

=== Duvalier debt ===
From 1957 to 1986 Haiti was ruled by the corrupt and oppressive Duvalier family. Loans incurred during this period alone were estimated to account for approximately 40% of Haiti's debt in 2000, before debt relief was granted. These funds were used to strengthen Duvalier control over Haiti and for various fraudulent schemes. Large amounts were simply stolen by the Duvaliers. Jean-Claude Duvalier, who ran the country from 1971 to 1986 was exiled to France after being overthrown and has been charged with theft and misappropriation of funds during his rule.

== Debt cancellation efforts ==
Haiti had a total external debt of $2.1 billion at its peak. Jubilee USA, Jubilee Debt Campaign (UK) and others, called for the immediate cancellation of Haiti's debt to multilateral institutions, including the World Bank, International Monetary Fund (IMF), and the Inter-American Development Bank, based on the argument that this debt is unjust (under a legal term called odious debt) and that Haiti could better use the funds going toward debt service for education, health care, and basic infrastructure. Several organizations in the U.S. issued action alerts around the Haiti Debt Cancellation Resolution, and a Congressional letter to the U.S. Treasury, including Jubilee USA, the Institute for Justice & Democracy in Haiti and Pax Christi USA.

Between 2006 and 2009, Haiti was added to the World Bank and IMF's highly indebted poor country initiative (HIPC). The Haiti Debt Cancellation Resolution had 66 co-sponsors in the U.S. House of Representatives as of February 2008. In September 2009, following a program of economic and social reforms, Haiti met the requirements for completion of the HIPC program, qualifying it for cancellation of its external debt obligations. This cut the face value of the debt by $757 million and future debt service (including interest) by $1.2 billion.

Haiti's largest creditor, the Inter-American Development Bank (IDB), was part of the debt relief initiative, but the initiative only canceled loans made before 2005, and the IDB had lent more since. Haiti's debt to the IDB amounts to approximately half a billion dollars with debt service payments projected by the IMF to increase in the following years. The U.S. government has been paying this debt service on Haiti's behalf since before the quake.

Following the devastating effects of the early 2010 earthquake in Haiti there came renewed calls for a further debt cancellation from civil society groups. In light of the tragedy and new borrowing that lifted Haiti's debts back to $1.25 billion, groups such as the Jubilee Debt Campaign called for this debt to be dropped. Furthermore, during the aftermath emergency money was offered to the Haitian government from the IMF in the form of loans. Civil society groups protested the offer of loans and not grants for such an already heavily indebted country trying to cope with such destruction. Some have argued, however, that because Haiti's annual debt service payments are so low ($9 million a year, net of the debt service paid on Haiti's behalf by the U.S. government), canceling the debt would do little to help the country recover from the earthquake, and should not be a priority for activism.

Agence France Press reported on 26 January 2010 that President Hugo Chavez of Venezuela said that Petrocaribe, Venezuela's cut-rate regional energy alliance, will forgive Haiti's debt. Haiti's debt with Venezuela is $295 million, about one-quarter of its foreign debt of $1.25 billion, according to International Monetary Fund figures.

On 28 May 2010, the World Bank announced it had waived Haiti's remaining debts to the bank. The value of the waiver was $36 million.

In 2015, France forgave about US$77 million (~$99.3 million in 2024) in modern-day debt, unrelated to independence. In 2004, the Haitian government demanded that France repay Haiti for the millions of dollars paid between 1825 and 1947 as compensation for the property loss of French slaveholders and landowners as a result of the slaves' freedom. In 2015, the French government rejected this demand as well as any reparations in general.

== See also ==
- Odious debt
- Debt of developing countries
