= List of sovereign debt crises =

The list of sovereign debt crises involves the inability of independent countries to meet its liabilities, as they become due. These include:

- a sovereign default, where a government suspends debt repayments;
- a debt restructuring plan, where the government agrees with other countries, or unilaterally reduces its debt repayments;
- requiring assistance from the International Monetary Fund or another international source.

Debts could be owed either to private parties within a country, to foreign investors, or to other countries.

The following table includes actual sovereign defaults and debt restructuring of independent countries since 1557.

== Africa ==
Country	Date	Type, causes, consequences and references
Angola	1976	
Angola	1992–2002	
Cameroon	2004	
Egypt	1876	The crisis caused the Urabi revolt and the subsequent British invasion of Egypt in 1882.
Gabon	1999–2005	
Ghana	1982	
Ghana	2022	
Liberia	1989–2006	
Madagascar	2002	
Mozambique	1980	
Rwanda	1995	
Sierra Leone	1997–98	
Sudan	1991	
Tunisia	1986	
Zaire	1979	
Zambia	2020	Default due to high debt levels, following the COVID-19 pandemic and commodity price drops. Followed by the IMF bailout, in 2022.
Zimbabwe	2006	See Hyperinflation in Zimbabwe

== Asia ==
Country	Date	Type, causes, consequences and references
China	1921	
China	1932	
China	1939	
Indonesia	1966	
Japan	1946–52	Due to an over-issued national bond amounting to more than twice as GDP, bank accounts were blocked. (bank blockade)
Kuwait	1990–91	
Lebanon	2020	Lebanon defaulted on US$1.2 billion in Eurobonds.
Myanmar	1984	
Myanmar	1987	
Mongolia	1997–2000	
North Korea	1975–1990	
Sri Lanka	2022	Sri Lankan economic crisis (2019–2024)
Thailand	1997–2007	1997 Asian financial crisis
Vietnam	1975	

== Europe ==
Country	Date	Type, causes, consequences and references
Austria	1811	
Austria	1816	Caused by the War of the Sixth Coalition. Ended by the establishment of Austria's central bank: Oesterreichische Nationalbank.
Austria	1945	
Croatia	1993–96	
Cyprus	2012-2013	2012–2013 Cypriot financial crisis
Denmark	1813	Danish state bankruptcy of 1813
France	1788	On 17 August 1788, the royal treasury began paying creditors in IOUs rather than money, after service on debt (mainly from the Seven Years' War and American War of Independence) had depleted the royal treasury to just 400,000 livres (one day's worth of state expenses). To restore state credit, the royal ministry called the Estates General of 1789 to make structural reforms to state revenue.
France	1797	Deflation, after the withdrawal of the assignat and mandat territorial led Finance Minister Dominique-Vincent Ramel-Nogaret to repudiate of 2/3 of French state debt.
Germany	1812	State spending during the Napoleonic Wars was extremely high, due, in large manner, to the high level of military expenditures.
Germany	1932	Under the Versailles Treaty ending the First World War, Germany was forced to make war reparations. The Young Plan of 1929 was meant to settle the structure, but in the Great Depression repayments became impossible. In the Lausanne Conference of 1932, the U.K. and France agreed to a suspension of payments. The U.S. Congress rejected it, but payments ceased, until the implementation of the London Agreement on German External Debts in 1953.
Germany	1948	See London Agreement on German External Debts
Greece	2012	
Greece	2015	Due to the Greek government-debt crisis, Greece failed to make a €1.6 billion payment to the IMF on time (payment was made with a 20-day delay).
Russia	1918	Repudiation of Tsarist debts by Bolshevik revolutionaries.
Russia	1998	After world commodity prices dropped on major Russian exports (particularly metals and oil), the 1998 Russian financial crisis ensued. Mounting debts led to the government declaring a moratorium on payments to international creditors.
Russia	2022	2022 Russian debt default
Spain	1936–39	
Sweden	1812	Military expenditures as a consequence of the Napoleonic Wars.
Ukraine	1998–2000	
Yugoslavia	1983	Avoided default through a multinational emergency loan.

== North America ==
Country	Date	Type, causes, consequences and references
Antigua and Barbuda	1998–2005	
Barbados	2018	Defaulted on its Eurobonds, after the uncovering of its high sovereign debt in terms of debt-to-GDP ratio.
Dominica	2003–05	
Dominican Republic	1975–2001	Latin American debt crisis
El Salvador	1981–96	
Grenada	2004–05	
Mexico	1850	
Mexico	1982	Latin American debt crisis
Panama	1988–89	
United States	1790	Crisis began in 1782. Ended by the Compromise of 1790 and the Funding Act of 1790.
United States	1814	Late interest payments, due to the War of 1812
United States	1875	US devalued the USD (Specie Payment Resumption Act)
United States	1865	The Confederate States of America lost the American civil war and ceased to exist, thus defaulting on their debts. The United States passed the Fourteenth Amendment to the United States Constitution in 1868, which prohibited assumption of the debts.
United States	1933	Suspension of federal payments in gold, amid a bank crisis and international run on gold reserves.
United States	1953	Congress refuses to raise the United States debt ceiling, forcing the federal government to reduce spending, monetize gold and use cash balances with banks, until the ceiling was eventually raised.
United States	1995-96	Congress fails to reach agreement with President Clinton on the budget, resulting in the United States federal government shutdowns of 1995–1996; Republicans also threaten not to raise the debt ceiling.
United States	2011	2011 U.S. debt-ceiling crisis
United States	2013	2013 U.S. debt-ceiling crisis
United States	2023	2023 U.S. debt-ceiling crisis

== South America ==
Country	Date	Type, causes, consequences and references
Argentina	1827	Default
Argentina	1890	Baring crisis
Argentina	1982	Latin American debt crisis
Argentina	1988–89	Latin American debt crisis
Argentina	2001	Following years of instability, the Argentine economic crisis (1999–2002) came to a head and a new government announced it could not meet its public debt obligations.
Argentina	2005–16	Argentine debt restructuring.
Argentina	2014	
Argentina	2020	
Bolivia	1927	
Brazil	1986–87	
Brazil	1990	
Ecuador	2020	
Paraguay	1874	The payment of loans taken in the English market between 1871-72 was stopped, due to bad economic conditions.
Paraguay	1920	The payment of foreign loans was once again suspended, due to adverse economic and political conditions.
Peru	1850	
Suriname	2001–02	
Suriname	2020	
Uruguay	1937	
Venezuela	1995–97	
Venezuela	1998	
Venezuela	2017	Venezuela defaulted on US$65 billion in external debt in November 2017, after years of unsustainable borrowing and a crash in global oil prices.

== Oceania ==
Country	Date	Type, causes, consequences and references
Australia	1931	Australia defaulted on its entire stock of domestic debt owed to bond and note holders. See: Great Depression in Australia.
Solomon Islands	1995–2004	Default on domestic debt, not external debt.

== See also ==
- List of corporate collapses and scandals
- List of stock market crashes and bear markets
- List of largest bank failures in the United States
- Bond market
- Currency crisis
- Government debt
- War reparations
- Global settlement
- London Club
- Paris Club
