= Alexander Nahum Sack =

American philosopher (1890–1955)

Alexander Nahum Sack or Aleksandr Naumovich Zak (5 October 1890 in Moscow, Russia – 1955 in New York City, United States) was a jurisprudence expert and professor of Russian law, specialized in international financial legislation.

Sack was born in Moscow. After teaching at Petrograd Imperial University, he left Soviet Russia in 1921 to settle in Estonia, where he advised the government in monetary issues. He also gained Estonian citizenship, but he moved to Paris in 1925. He taught at the Institute of Political Studies in Paris and at the International Law Academy in The Hague before moving to London in 1929 to work as an expert for Equitable Life Insurance. Work for this company led him to New York in 1930. After obtaining American citizenship in 1936, he was invited to teach at Northwestern University and New York University until 1943, working as a freelance law expert for the Justice Department until 1947.

Sack is best known for his formalization of the odious debt doctrine in his work Les effets des transformations des Etats sur leurs dettes publiques et autres obligations financières (Effects of the transformations of the states in their public debts and other financial obligations), published in Paris in 1927, when he taught law at the Institute of Political Studies. Alexander Sack synthesised the concept of odious debt based on precedents from the 19th century, such as the Mexican government rejection to pay debts acquired by the emperor Maximilian I, and the rejection by the United States, once annexed Cuba, to pay the debts acquired when it was a Spanish colony.

== Works ==
- Razverstka gosudarstvennykh dolgov, Berlin: Knigoizdatelʹstvo "Slovo", 1923
- Fixing the Value of Money, Riga, "The Latvian Economist", 1925
- Les effets des transformations des Etats sur leurs dettes publiques et autres obligations financières: traité juridique et financier, Recueil Sirey, Paris, 1927
- La succession aux dettes publiques d'état, Hachette, París, 1929
- Conflicts of Laws in the History of the English Law, New York University Press, 1937
- Diplomatic Claims against the Soviets (1918–1938), New York University Law Quarterly Review, New York University School of Law, Contemporary Law Pamphlets, series 1, no. 7, 1938
- Belligerent Recaptures in International Practice, New York, NY, New York University School of law, 1940

== Bibliography ==
- Sarah Ludington & Mitu Gulati, A Convenient Untruth: Fact and Fantasy in the Doctrine of Odious Debts, September 14, 2007, The Cambridge Mellon Sawyer seminar, Cambridge University. Visited on July 17, 2011
- The doctrine of odious debt, in Unconstitutional regimes and the validity of sovereign debt: a legal perspective, Sabine Michalowski, 2007, Ashgate, ISBN 978-0-7546-4793-5
