= Odious debt =

International law legal theory

In international law, odious debt, also known as illegitimate debt, is a legal theory that says that the national debt incurred by a despotic regime should not be enforceable. Such debts are, thus, considered by this doctrine to be personal debts of the government that incurred them and not debts of the state. In some respects, the concept is analogous to the invalidity of contracts signed under coercion. Whether or not it is possible to discharge debts in this manner is a matter of dispute.

== History ==
The concept has antecedents dating back to the 1800s and has received support from diverse fields such as economics, philosophy, political science, history, and law.

The concept of odious debt was formalized in a 1927 treatise by Alexander Nahum Sack, a Russian émigré legal theorist. It was based on two 19th-century precedents—Mexico's repudiation of debts incurred by Emperor Maximilian, and the denial by the United States of Cuban liability for debts incurred by the Spanish colonial regime.

Sack wrote:

When a despotic regime contracts a debt, not for the needs or in the state's interests, but rather to strengthen itself, to suppress a popular insurrection, etc, this debt is odious for the people of the entire state. This debt does not bind the nation; it is a debt of the regime, a personal debt contracted by the ruler, and consequently, it falls with the regime's demise. The reason why these odious debts cannot attach to the territory of the state is that they do not fulfill one of the conditions determining the lawfulness of State debts, namely that State debts must be incurred, and the proceeds used, for the needs and in the interests of the State. Odious debts, contracted and utilized for purposes which, to the lenders' knowledge, are contrary to the needs and the interests of the nation, are not binding on the nation – when it succeeds in overthrowing the government that contracted them – unless the debt is within the limits of real advantages that these debts might have afforded. The lenders have committed a hostile act against the people, they cannot expect a nation that has freed itself of a despotic regime to assume these odious debts, which are the personal debts of the ruler.

Sack theorized that such debts are not enforceable when (1) the lender should have known that (2) the debt was incurred without the consent and (3) without benefit to the populace. There are many examples of similar debt repudiation.

Chief Justice William Howard Taft, acting as an arbiter, used the doctrine in 1923 to find that Costa Rica did not have to pay the United Kingdom debts incurred by the Federico Tinoco Granados regime.

Despite such rulings, Mitu Gulati argues that odious debt is not part of international law because "[n]o national or international tribunal has ever cited Odious Debt as grounds for invalidating a sovereign obligation."

== Mechanics of odious borrowing ==
=== Debt purpose and legitimacy ===
Sovereign debt can be classified by its intended purpose as infrastructure investments, debt refinancing, or military expenditure. Debts incurred by a regime to repress its population or used for personal rather than state purposes are odious. Establishing correlation between odious harm and despotic looting may be difficult, especially if a large amount of time has passed.

== Reception ==
Patricia Adams, executive director of Probe International, a Canadian environmental and public policy advocacy organization and author of Odious Debts: Loose Lending, Corruption, and the Third World's Environmental Legacy, stated: "by giving creditors an incentive to lend only for purposes that are transparent and of public benefit, future tyrants will lose their ability to finance their armies, and thus the war on terror and the cause of world peace will be better served." In a Cato Institute policy analysis, Adams suggested that debts incurred by Iraq during Saddam Hussein's reign were odious because the money was spent on weapons, instruments of repression, and palaces.

A 2002 article by economists Seema Jayachandran and Michael Kremer renewed interest in this topic. They propose that the idea can be used to create a new type of economic sanction to block further borrowing by dictators. Jayachandran proposed new recommendations in November 2010 at the 10th anniversary of the Jubilee movement at the Center for Global Development in Washington, D.C. Subsequently, the loan sanctions model has been adopted by the Centre for Global Developments and has been the base for a number of further suggestions. Some think the doctrine could aid international development. Others think that the doctrine should allow even more kinds of debt to be canceled.

== Application ==
After acquiring Puerto Rico through the Spanish–American War, the United States refused to pay the colony's creditors, asserting they held odious debt.

During Mobutu Sese Seko's rule of Zaire, Transparency International estimated he stole $5 billion. Total capital flight was estimated at $12 billion.

In December 2008, Ecuadorian President Rafael Correa attempted to default on Ecuador's national debt, calling it illegitimate odious debt, because corrupt and despotic prior regimes contracted it. He succeeded in reducing the price of the debt letters before continuing paying the debt.

After the overthrow of Haiti's Jean-Claude Duvalier in 1986, there were calls to cancel Haiti's debt owed to multilateral institutions, calling it unjust odious debt, and Haiti could better use the funds for education, health care, and basic infrastructure. As of February 2008, the Haiti Debt Cancellation Resolution had 66 co-sponsors in the U.S. House of Representatives. Several organizations in the United States issued action alerts around the Haiti Debt Cancellation Resolution, and a Congressional letter to the U.S. Treasury, including Jubilee USA, the Institute for Justice & Democracy in Haiti and Pax Christi USA.

== See also ==
- Debt of developing countries
- Debt relief
- Domestic liability dollarization
- Fourteenth Amendment to the United States Constitution
- Haiti's external debt
- Jubilee USA Network
- Moral hazard
- Repudiation of debt at the Russian Revolution
- Sovereign debt
- Sovereign default
