= Cactuseraie d'Escaïre-Figue =

Botanica garden in Occitanie, France

Coordinates: 43.2966°N 2.2237°E

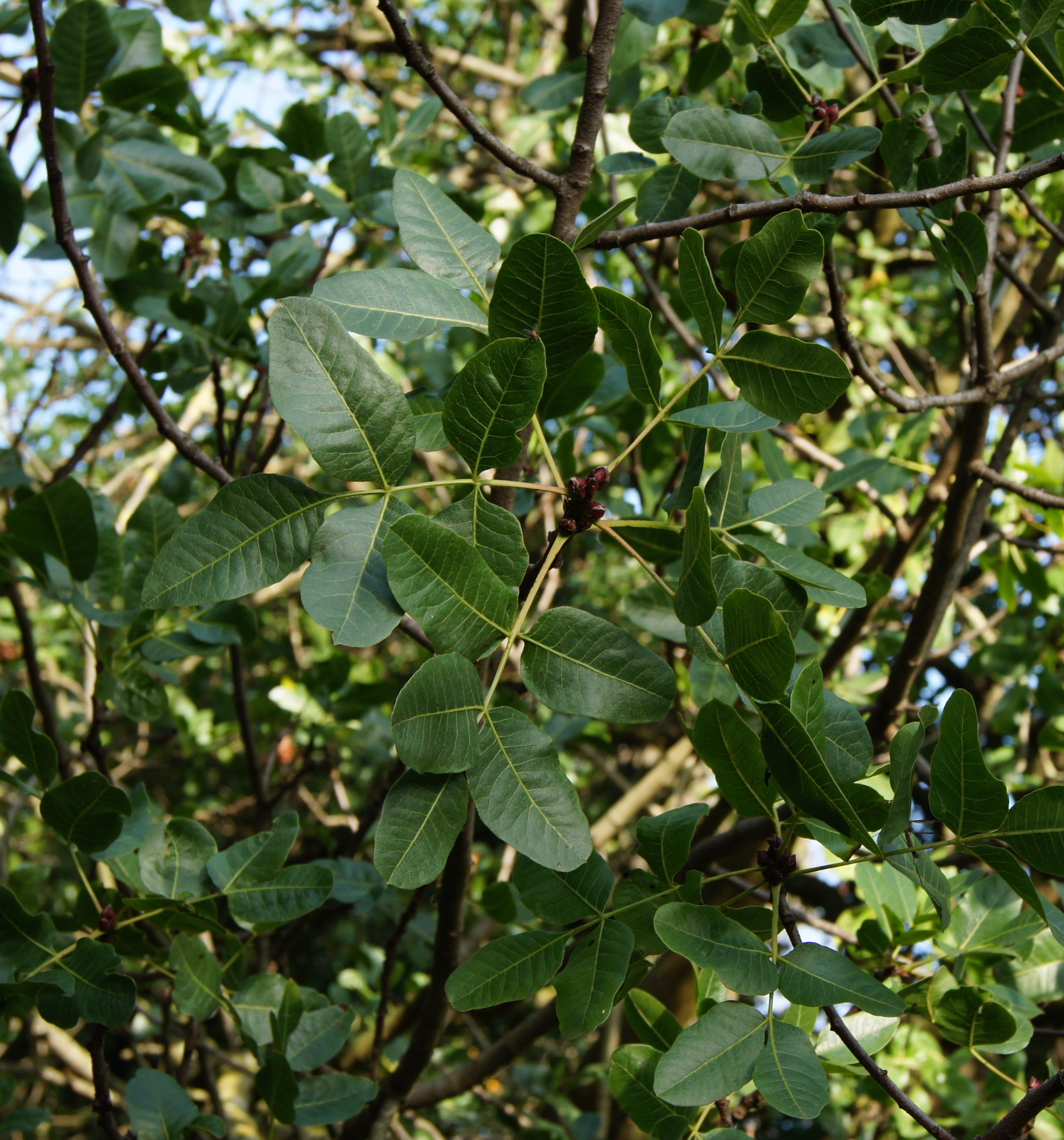

The Cactuseraie d'Escaïre-Figue (1 hectare) is a botanical garden specializing in cactus. It is located in Montolieu, Aude, Languedoc-Roussillon, France, and opens daily except Mondays.

The garden was created circa 2000, and now contains some 2,000 specimens representing about 900 varieties of cactus and succulents, in both natural and formal plantings, as well as a large greenhouse. Many of the plants have leaves.

== See also ==
- List of botanical gardens in France
