= National Bank of Haiti =

Bank of France

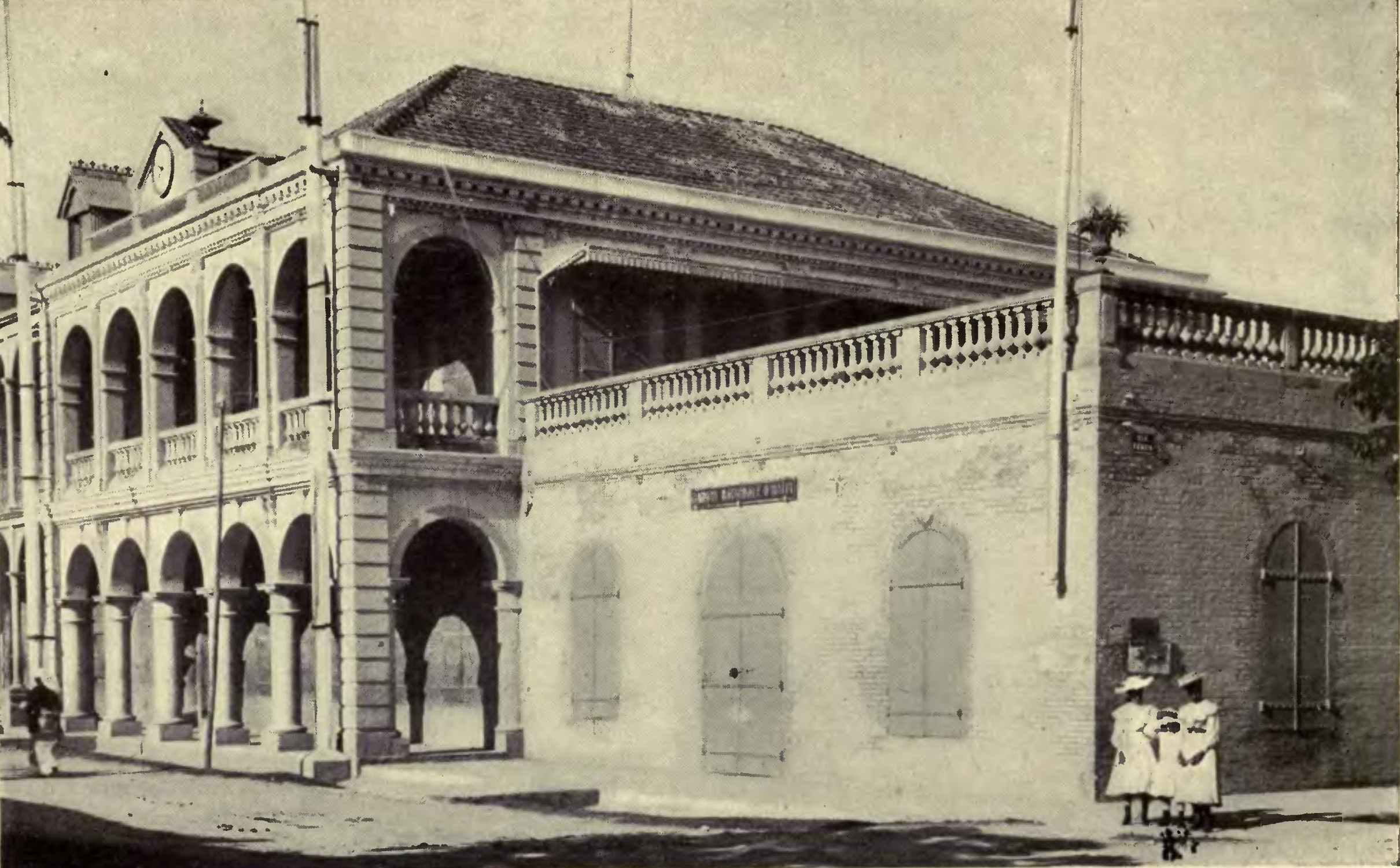
Seat of the National Bank of Haiti in Port-au-Prince, 1907

The National Bank of Haiti (French: Banque Nationale d'Haïti) was a French bank founded in 1881 by Crédit Industriel et Commercial and headquartered in Paris to serve the Haiti indemnity obligation. It had a monopoly of currency issuance in Haiti, by concession from the Haitian government. Antoine Simon closed it in 1910, and it was succeeded by the National Bank of the Republic of Haiti, also established in Paris.

== Overview ==
The National Bank of Haiti was conceived in the final stages of reimbursement of the notorious Haiti indemnity obligation that arose in the aftermath of the Haitian Revolution. It was the brainchild of President of Haiti Lysius Salomon, who in 1880 promoted the legislation (law of 10 September 1880) which created a 50-year concession for currency issuance and management of the country's finances. Crédit Industriel et Commercial (CIC), a French bank that had made a large loan of 36 million French Francs to Haiti in 1875, formed the National Bank in Paris in May 1881, and appointed Ernest Lehideux as its first president.

In Paris, the bank was headquartered at 49, rue Taitbout, not far from the seat of CIC which at the time was at 66, rue de la Victoire. For its main branch in Port-au-Prince, it built a neoclassical building that was later used by the National Bank of the Republic of Haiti.

The bank's creation ostensibly facilitated the full repayment of the Haiti indemnity, for which the last payment was made in 1883. However, the operations of the National Bank were a matter of controversy in Haiti, not least because of its aggressive charging of fees and repatriation of profits and dividends to France. Thus, the initial hopes that it would be an instrument of Haitian financial independence were quickly dashed. Haitian statesman Frédéric Marcelin was a prominent critic and in 1890 wrote an essay to denounce the bank's extraction of Haiti's riches and lack of positive contribution to the country's economic development.

In October 1910, Haitian President Antoine Simon revoked the National Bank's concession, ending its activity. He granted the concession for currency issuance and government treasury operations to the newly formed National Bank of the Republic of Haiti, also established in Paris at 55, rue de Chateaudun, whose initial majority shareholder was the Banque de l'Union Parisienne.

== See also ==
- Ottoman Bank
- State Bank of Morocco
- List of banks in France
