= Dominique-Vincent Ramel-Nogaret =

French lawyer and politician

Dominique-Vincent Ramel
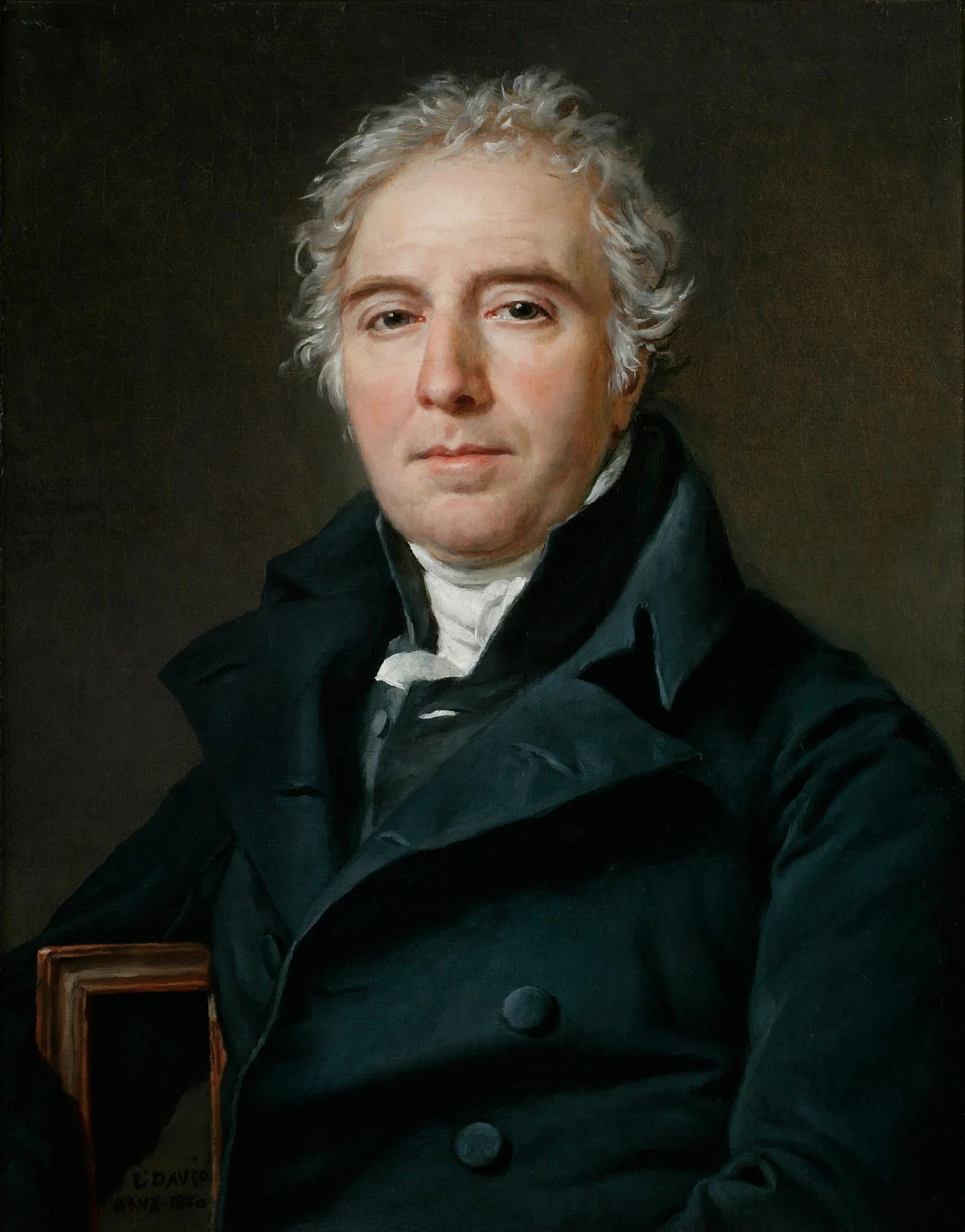
- Portrait of Ramel in 1820 by Jacques-Louis David
- Born: 3 November 1760; Montolieu, Aude, France
- Died: 31 March 1829 (aged 68); Brussels, Belgium.
- Occupations: Lawyer and politician
- Known for: Minister of Finance

Dominique-Vincent Ramel (called Ramel de Nogaret; 3 November 1760 – 31 March 1829) was a French lawyer and politician who became Minister of Finance under the French Directory. He was an energetic reformer, but was blamed for many of the financial problems of the time, and went into retirement during the French Consulate and First French Empire. He supported Napoleon during the Hundred Days of 1815. After the second Bourbon Restoration, as a regicide he was forced into exile in Belgium, where he died without returning to France.

== Early years ==
Dominique-Vincent Ramel was born in Montolieu, Aude, France, on 3 November 1760. His father's family were bourgeois cloth merchants and manufacturers established in Montolieu and said to have originated from Nogaret, Haute-Garonne. His great-grandfather, Antoine Ramel (1643–1715) was a king's advocate. His parents were Jean-Baptiste Ramel (1718–1800) and Marie-Rose Ducup of Saint-Ferriol (died 1791). He attended law school in Toulouse. He then acquired the posts of king's prosecutor in the maréchaussée of Montolieu, captain and royal judge. Most important, he was king's advocate in the maréchaussée and presidial seat of Carcassonne, a position he received from his great uncle, Louis-Joseph Benazet.

== Estates General and National Assembly ==
Ramel de Nogaret was a supporter of new ideas. On 23 March 1789 he was elected deputy for the third estate representing the sénéchaussée of Carcassonne in the Estates General of France. He took the Tennis Court Oath on 20 June 1789, which formally established the National Assembly. He was a member of the committee of alienation, and was appointed a commissioner for taking the oaths of troops. In June 1791 he was sent on a mission to Brittany, where there were serious disturbances, and was skillful in helping to calm the situation down.

Ramel de Nogaret was not a brilliant speaker, but worked actively in the committees. He was secretary of the Assembly on 18 July 1791. He opposed the division of France into departments on the grounds of the disruption this would cause in the administration and collection of taxes. After the Assembly session ended on 30 September 1791 he was named president of the court of Carcassonne.

== National Convention ==
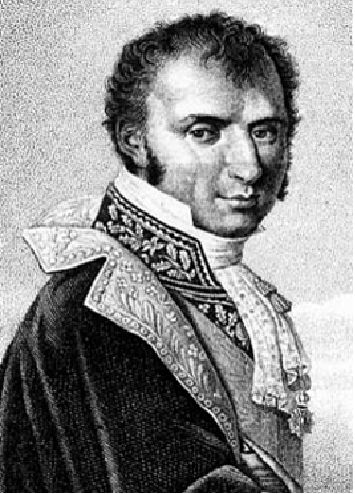
Dominique-Vincent Ramel de Nogaret, circa 1795

On 4 September 1792 the department of Aude elected Ramel to the National Convention. In the trial of Louis XVI, in the third division he said "Louis is guilty of conspiracy against freedom. At all times such a crime deserves death." He was in the minority that favored asking the people to ratify the verdict, and was in the majority that was opposed to temporarily suspending the king's execution. Ramel de Nogaret intervened in a considerable number of discussions, including those on the Constitution of 1793, on sale of the property of émigrés, creation of assignats and distribution of taxes. He was against the Law of the Maximum, which controlled food prices.

Ramel de Nogaret was made a member of the Committee of Public Safety, and proposed establishment of a "paternal Commission" to take the final decision on the guilt of the accused before sending them to court. He was rapporteur for the discussion of the forced loan of 19 August 1793, and was the accuser of Fabre d'Églantine. In 1795 he was sent on a mission to Holland, and helped ensure the rapid success of the troops of Jean-Charles Pichegru. On his return he was elected on 22 Vendémiaire IV (14 October 1795) by the department of Aude as member of the Council of Five Hundred.

== Minister of Finance ==
Due to the special study Ramel had made of tax issues, on 25 Pluviôse IV (14 February 1796) he was appointed Minister of Finance. He took office at a difficult time, with urgent demands from the armies. He developed the idea of the land registry, and managed the difficult transition from assignats to money. He was committed to alleviating public debt and to reforming the taxation system. In Brumaire VI (November 1797) he established taxation agencies in the departments with commissioners, tax collection staff and an inspector.

However, the disorders in tax administration towards the end of the Directory, for which he was not responsible, made him the target of anger for all the problems of the country. He was severely criticized by the press and by politicians. Antoine Claire Thibaudeau, Pierre-Antoine Antonelle and others accused him of colluding with the army suppliers. However, Ramel de Nogaret was no richer when he retired from power on 2 Thermidor VII (20 July 1799) than when he entered office.

On 30 September 1797, Ramel repudiated 2/3rds of France's public debt (fr).

== Later career ==
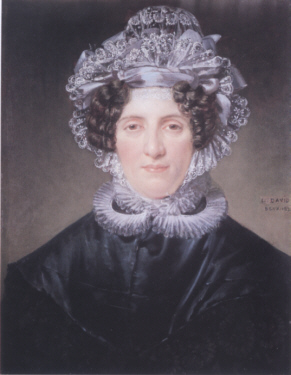
Ange-Pauline-Charlotte Panckoucke in 1820, by Jacques-Louis David

In the year VIII Ramel de Nogaret married Ange-Pauline-Charlotte Panckoucke, grand-niece of Charles-Joseph Panckoucke, the encyclopedist and founder of Le Moniteur. He remained out of politics during the French Consulate (1799–1804) and most of the First French Empire. By inheritance and his business activities Ramel had accumulated a large fortune, which gave him 20,000 francs of income in 1811. He bought a beautiful modern country house in Montolieu, the "little Versailles", surrounded by fertile parkland.

In 1812 Ramel de Nogaret accepted a position in the local government of Aude. During the Hundred Days of 1815 when Napoleon returned from exile he accepted the position of prefect in Normandy. After the second Bourbon Restoration, in January 1816 he was exiled as a regicide, and settled in Belgium, where he returned to his family's business of textile manufacture and trade. Dominique-Vincent Ramel died on 31 March 1829 in Brussels, Belgium.

Ramel de Nogaret had two daughters by his 1799 marriage with Pauline Panckoucke, Pauline and Mélanie. In 1820 the celebrated painter Jacques-Louis David (30 August 1748 – 29 December 1825) made portraits of Ramel and his wife, Ange-Pauline-Charlotte. The pictures remained in the family until 1913.

== Selected publications ==
Ramel's publications included:

- Rapport de la Commission des finances sur l'emprunt forcé d'un milliard 1793
- Des finances de la République française en l'an IX
- Corps législatif. Conseil des Cinq-Cents. Discours prononcé par manière de motion d'ordre, par D.-V. Ramel, député du département de l'Aude, dans la séance du 29 frimaire, l'an IV... sur les finances, le crédit des assignats, la nécessité des contributions et les avantages des contributions indirectes
- Rapport fait au nom du comité général des finances par D.V. Ramel, député du departement de l'Aude, sur les moyens propres à diminuer la masse des assignats mis en circulation séance du mardi 23 avril 1793, l'an deuxième de la République
- Projet de décret, présenté par le comité des finances, sur les procès et apposition des scellés des ci-devant ferme générale, régie, etc. Imprimé par ordre de la Convention générale. [Signé : D.-V. Ramel, rapporteur.]
- Des Finances de la République Française en l'an IX par D.-V. Ramel
- Ministère des Finances. Rapport fait par le ministre des finances au Directoire exécutif, sur la réponse au message du Conseil des Cinq-Cents, contenant demande de pièces justificatives de l'état des fonds affectés aux dépenses de l'exercice des l'an 7...
- Liberté, égalité. Paris, le 9 prairial an VI... D.-V. Ramel, ministre des finances, au citoyen Genissieu,...
- Le Ministre des Finances [D.-V. Nogaret] aux citoyens représentans du peuple membres de la commission des inspecteurs du palais national du Conseil des Cinq-Cents
- Corps législatif. Conseil des Cinq-Cents. Rapport et projet de résolution sur le brisement des formes, matrices et poinçons de la fabrication des assignats. Fait et présenté par la commission des finances, dans la séance du 9 pluviôse, l'an IV. Imprimé par ordre du Conseil. (D.-V. Ramel, rapporteur.)
