= Treaty of Aranjuez (1777) =

1777 treaty between France and Spain

In the Treaty of Aranjuez of 1777, France and Spain agreed to create a fixed border between the two colonies, mapped and defined from sea to sea. This was the original border that divided the island into two parts.

The Treaty of Aranjuez was signed on 3 June 1777 between France and Spain. Based on the terms of the treaty, the two countries agreed to define the border of their respective colonies on the island of Santo Domingo (also known as Hispaniola) in the Caribbean Sea, of which they shared ownership. Spain made substantial gains in the upper Artibonite Valley in middle section of the island. The new border was to be marked by border stones. It was signed at Aranjuez Palace, near Madrid, in Spain. It was one of a number of diplomatic agreements signed at the palace in the eighteenth century and should not be confused with the 1779 Treaty of Aranjuez between the two states, which led to Spain's entry into the American War of Independence.

== Aftermath ==
The northernmost and southernmost parts of the international border between Haiti and the Dominican Republic still conform to the boundaries between the French and Spanish colonies agreed to in the Treaty of Aranjuez. However, in the 20th century, the middle portion of the boundary was changed to make it closer to a straight north–south line and thereby transferred a large portion of Hispaniola from the Dominican Republic to Haiti. An original boundary stone is on display in the Museo de las Casas Reales, Santo Domingo.

== See also ==
- Devastations of Osorio
- List of treaties
