= Frédéric Marcelin =

Haitian writer and politician

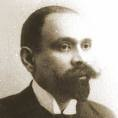
- Born: Frédéric Marcelin; January 11, 1848; Port-au-Prince, Haiti
- Died: 1917 (aged 68–69)
- Occupations: Writer, politician

Frédéric Marcelin (1848–1917) was a Haitian writer and politician. Born in Port-au-Prince, Marcelin was best known for the three novels Marilisse (1903), La Vengeance de Mama (1902), and Thémistocle Epaminondas Labasterre (1901). Along with his contemporaries Fernand Hibbert and Justin Lhérisson he worked to establish a uniquely Haitian novel.

He also wrote an essay on the National Bank of Haiti, Haïti et sa Banque Nationale (1896), and another on the "Finance and Commerce Department", (Le Départment des Finances et du Commerce d'Haïti) (1896).

He was Minister of Finance 1892-1895 and 1905–1908.
