= Bank of the Republic of Haiti =

Central bank of Haiti

Coordinates: 18°32′54″N 72°20′45″W

Bank of the Republic of Haiti Banque de la République d'Haïti Bank Repiblik Ayiti (ht)
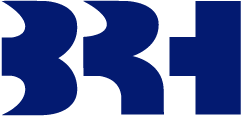

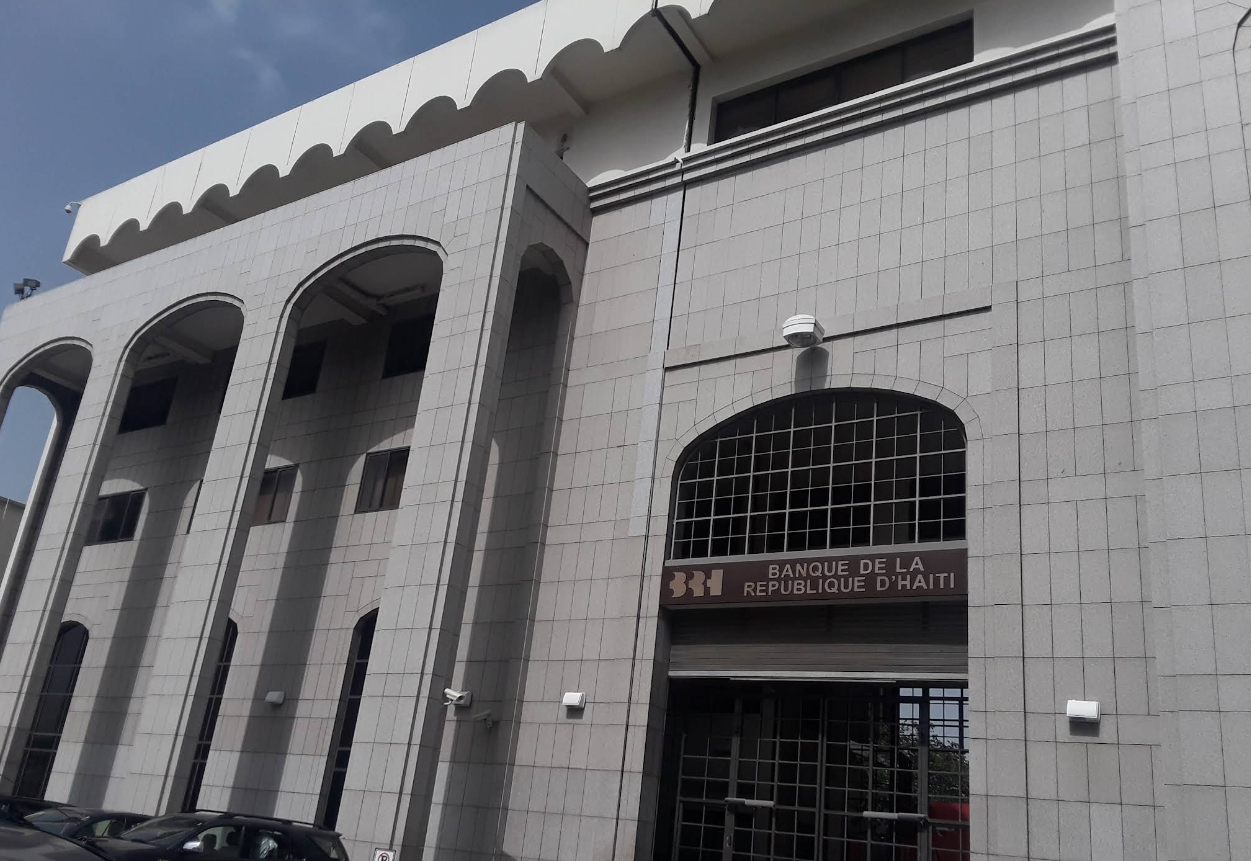
- Central bank of: Haiti
- Headquarters: Port-au-Prince, Haiti
- Established: 17 August 1979
- Ownership: 100% state ownership
- Governor: Ronald Gabriel
- Currency: Haitian gourde HTG (ISO 4217)
- Reserves: 1 820 million USD
- Preceded by: National Bank of the Republic of Haiti
- Website: brh.ht

The Bank of the Republic of Haiti (French: Banque de la République d'Haïti, abbreviated BRH) is the central bank of Haiti. It was formed in 1979 from the National Bank of the Republic of Haiti (French: Banque Nationale de la République d'Haïti), which had served as the country's bank of issue since 1910, itself succeeding the National Bank of Haiti.

The bank is active in promoting financial inclusion policy and is a member institution of the Alliance for Financial Inclusion. It recently announced a Maya Declaration Commitment to continue with the modernization of the payment system, and submit legislation to regulate and supervise micro finance institutions to relevant authorities in 2013.

The central bank in Port-au-Prince was stormed during the Haitian riots of 2024. The attack was driven back by the bank's security guards leaving 3 people killed.

== Background ==
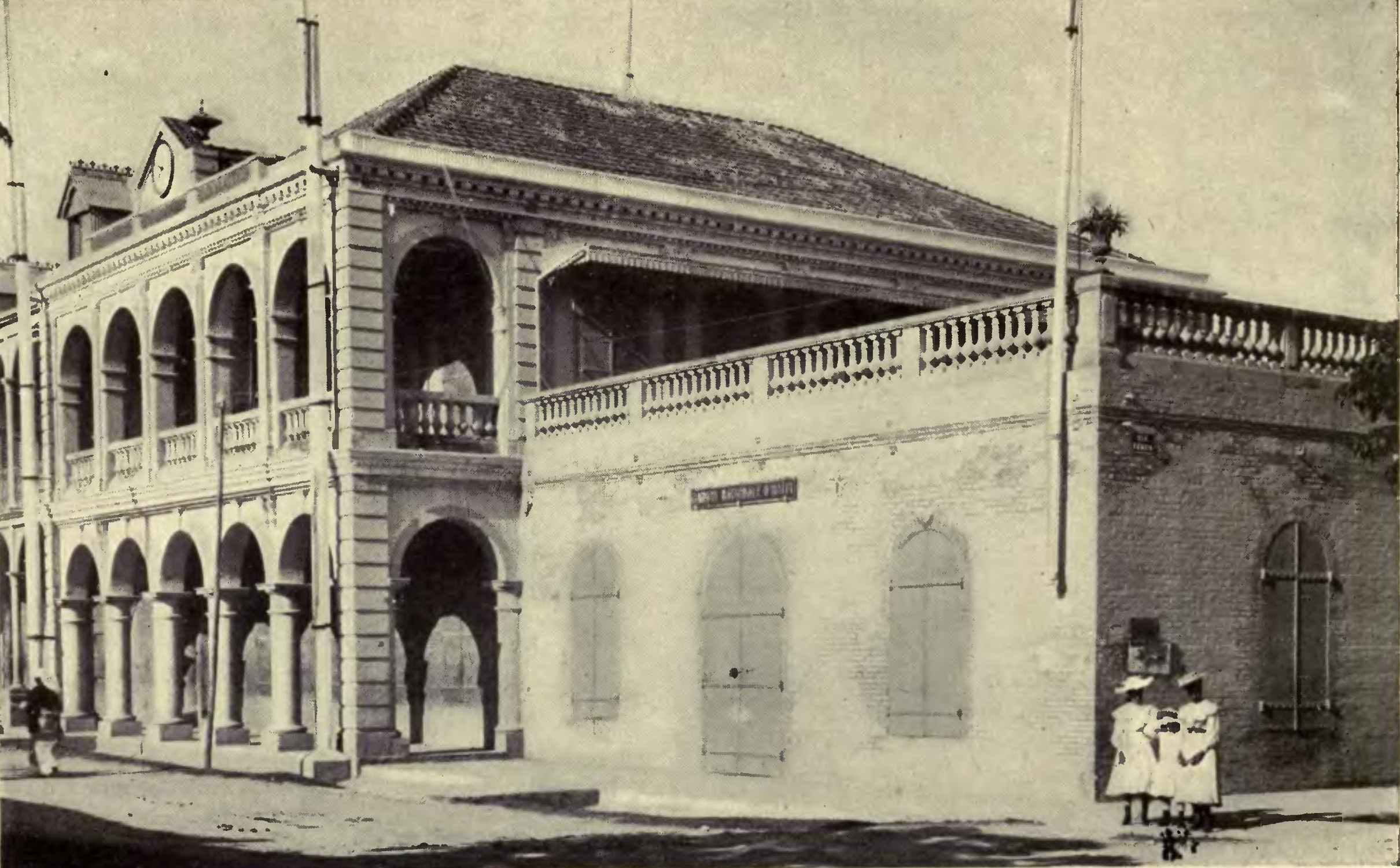
National Bank of Haiti, 1907

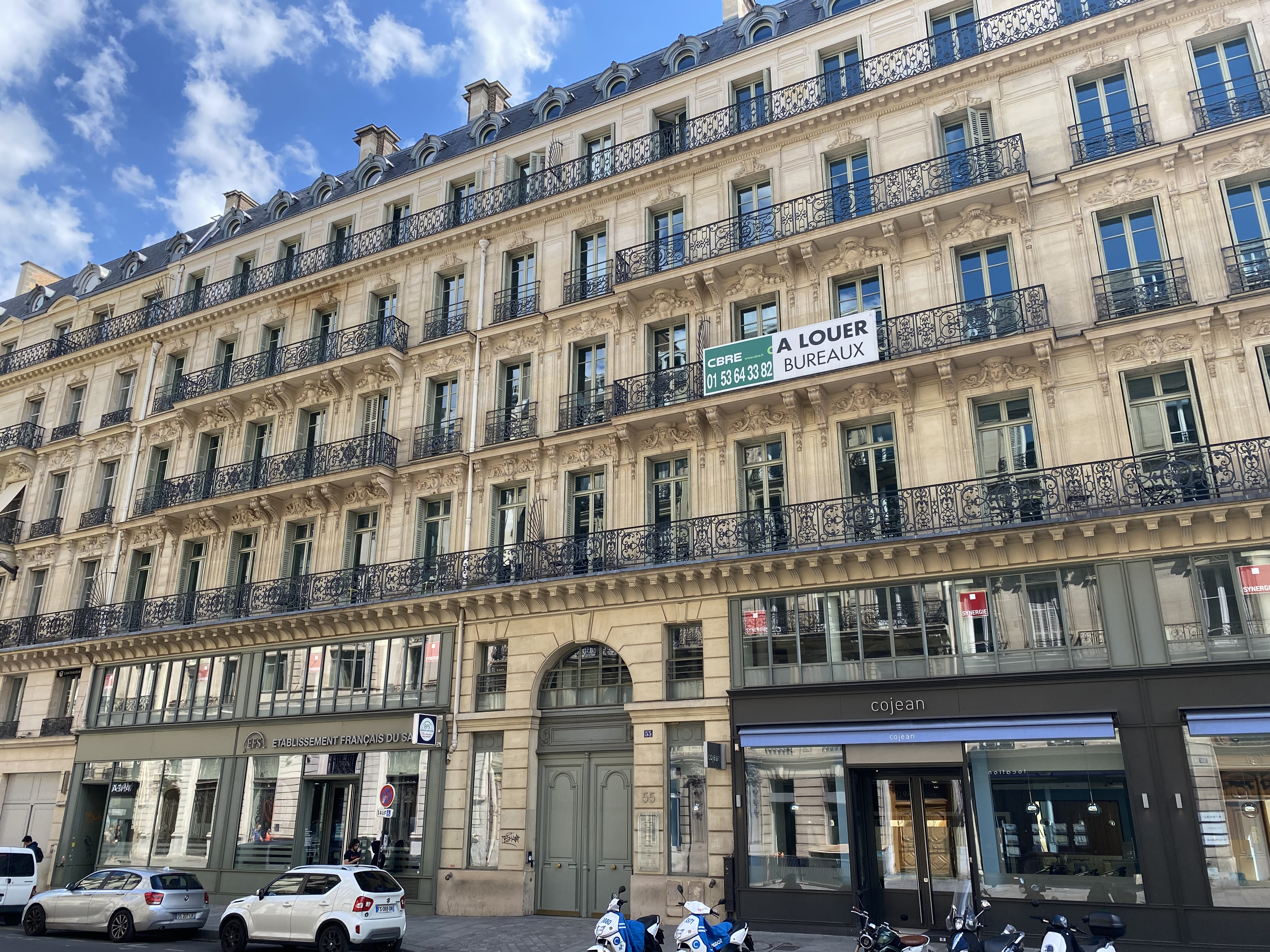
Former headquarters of the BNRH in the 1910s at 55, rue de Chateaudun in Paris

The oldest reference to a bank in Haiti can be attributed to a short correspondence exchanged during September 1825 between a foreign tradesman, Nicholas Kane, the Secretary of State Balthazar Inginac about a proposal made by George Clark in the name of a German group, Hermann Hendrick and Co., to establish a bank in Haiti. However, the proposal was never accepted, and Hermann Hendrick and Co. was never established.

A Haitian law of 1880 allowed for a currency issuance concession to be granted to a privileged bank, and the National Bank of Haiti was subsequently established in Paris in early 1881 by the French bank Crédit Industriel et Commercial. In October 1910, the issuance concession was transferred to a new bank, the National Bank of the Republic of Haiti (BNRH) formed by a consortium of French, German and American interests. The National City Bank of New York took over the BNRH following the United States occupation of Haiti, and gained full ownership in 1919. In 1935, the Haitian government acquired the BNRH from National City Bank. In 1979, BNRH was split into two financial institutions: the Banque nationale de crédit (BNC), a commercial bank, and the Bank of the Republic of Haiti.

== Governors ==
- Antonio André, September 1979 - July 1980
- Gérard Martineau, July 1980 - February 1982
- Marcel Léger, February 1982 - July 1982
- Antonio André, July 1982 - April 1983
- Allan Nolté, April 1983 - June 1985
- Jean Claude Sanon, June 1985 - February 1986
- Onill Millet, February 1986 - June 1988
- Hubert Cameau, administrator, June 1988 - August 1988
- Joseph Lagroue, director, August 1988 - September 1988
- Ernest Ricot, September 1988 - June 1989
- Jacques Vilgrain, June 1989 - March 1990
- Serge Pothel, March 1990 - August 1990
- Charles Beaulieu, August 1990 - April 1991
- Roger Pérodin, April 1991 - December 1991
- Bonivert Claude, December 1991 - October 1994
- Roger Pérodin, October 1994 - December 1994
- Leslie Delatour, December 1994 - February 1998
- Fritz Jean, February 1998 - August 2001
- Venel Joseph, August 2001 - April 2004
- Raymond Magloire, April 2004 - September 2007
- Charles Castel, September 2007 - December 2015
- Jean Baden Dubois, December 2015 - October 2023
- Ronald Gabriel, October 2023 - current

== See also ==
- Economy of Haiti
- Haitian gourde
- List of central banks
