= Montolieu =

Commune in Occitanie, France

- Commune
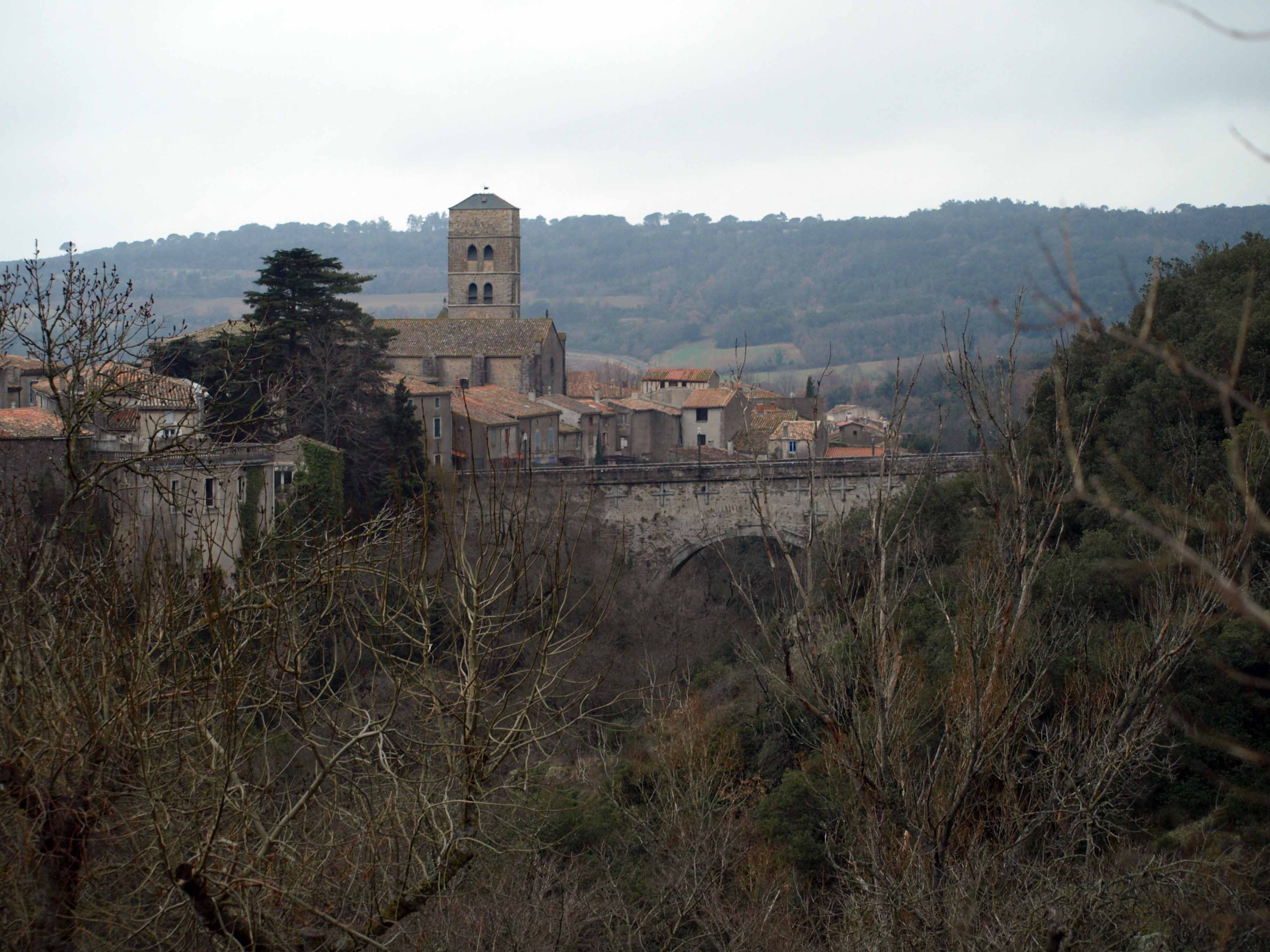
- A general view of Montolieu

- Coat of arms
- Location of Montolieu
- Location within France Location within Occitanie
- Coordinates: 43°18′36″N 2°12′57″E
- Country: France
- Region: Occitania
- Department: Aude
- Arrondissement: Carcassonne
- Canton: La Malepère à la Montagne Noire
- Intercommunality: Carcassonne Agglo

Government
  - Mayor (2020–2026): Bernard Lauret
- Area^{1}: 23.65 km^{2} (9.13 sq mi)
- Elevation: 200 m (660 ft)
- Highest elevation: 407 m (1,335 ft)
- Lowest elevation: 123 m (404 ft)
- Population (2023): 829
  - Density: 35.1/km^{2} (90.8/sq mi)
- Time zone: UTC+01:00 (CET)
  - Summer (DST): UTC+02:00 (CEST)
- INSEE/Postal code: 11253 /11170
- Website: montolieu-livre.fr
- ^{1} French Land Register data, which excludes lakes, ponds, glaciers > 1 km^{2} (0.386 sq mi or 247 acres) and river estuaries.

Montolieu (French pronunciation: [mɔ̃tɔljø]; Occitan: Montoliu) is a commune in the Aude department of southern France.

== Village of books ==
Sometimes referred to as the "Village of Books", Montolieu contains fifteen bookshops, mostly specializing in secondhand and antique books. Many artists also live and work in Montolieu, with five workshops and galleries of painters and sculptors and three photographers' studios. The commune also contains a cactus garden, the Cactuseraie d'Escaïre-Figue. In 1990, Michel Braibant, a bookbinder in Carcassonne, came up with the idea of a Village of Books in Montolieu, inspired by the Welsh Hay-on-Wye. He created the association Montolieu Village du Livre and founded the Musée des Arts & Métiers du Livre ("museum of book arts & crafts).

== Population ==
Historical population
Year	Pop.	±% p.a.
1968	896	—
1975	837	−0.97%
1982	852	+0.25%
1990	807	−0.68%
1999	786	−0.29%
2007	760	−0.42%
2012	825	+1.65%
2017	846	+0.50%
2023	829	−0.34%
Source: INSEE
