= Action alert =

An action alert is a message that an organization sends to mobilize people, often members of the group and supporters of a specific point of view, calling on them to take action to influence public policy. Typically, action alerts are in reference to a timely issue, where prompt action is needed in order to affect upcoming decisions.

== Description ==
Action alerts are considered a cost-effective and efficient grassroots organizing tool and are employed widely by many advocacy organizations. A well-designed action alert can be a "powerful way to invite people to participate in the processes of a democracy."

Action alerts may, for instance, ask supporters to:

- Contact their legislator to highlight the issue or argue for/against proposed legislation; or
- Write a letter to the editor about a specific item in the news.

Action alerts commonly begin by explaining the public policy issue to the recipients, and then tell the reader how they can impact the decision. Action alerts go by many other names. Amnesty International, for instance, refers to them as "Urgent actions".

== Organisations that use action alerts ==
- Citizens Against Government Waste
- People for the Ethical Treatment of Animals
- Electronic Frontier Foundation
- Union of Concerned Scientists
- American Family Association
- Public Citizen
- National Right to Work Committee
- Tea Party Express
- Free Software Foundation
- Unrepresented Nations and Peoples Organization
- Amnesty International
- Human Rights Watch
- Corruption Watch (South Africa)
- Transparency International
- Indonesia Corruption Watch
- Anti-Corruption Foundation
- Watchdog.org
- International Republican Institute
