= Consolidated Third =

Sovereign default of France in 1797

The Consolidated Third (French: le tiers consolidé) is the name given in France to the 1797 repudiation of public debt of which only one third was guaranteed.

In 1797, France faced a debt load of 4 billion francs, much higher than the previous peak in 1715, and a new record. Moreover, the country was experiencing a phase of hyperinflation due, in part, to Gresham's law thanks to the over-printing of Assignat, which lowered purchasing power.

Due to this, the French Directory and the Minister of Finance, Dominique-Vincent Ramel-Nogaret, on 30 September 1797, issued one-time only paper bonds that would be redeemable for national lands; similar to what the Assignat was originally before it became a paper currency. The value of these bonds was only one third of the value of the national debt, thus being a form of debt consolidation.

This would represent a repudiation of most of the state's debt, and a bankruptcy of two-thirds of the debt, leading to the euphemism of the remaining being a consolidated third.
