= International rankings of Norway =

The following are some international rankings of Norway.

== Life quality ==
- United Nations Development Programme: 2019 Human Development Index, ranked 1st out of 189 countries
- United Nations Development Programme: 2019 Inequality-adjusted Human Development Index, ranked 1st out of 189 countries
- The Economist: 2013 Where-to-be-born Index: ranked 3 out of 80 countries
- United Nations Sustainable Development Solutions Network: 2015 World Happiness Report, ranked 1 out of 85 countries
- Commission on the Measurement of Economic Performance and Social Progress: 2015 OECD Better Life Index, ranked 1 out of 36 countries
- The Legatum Institute: 2015 Legatum Prosperity Index, ranked 1 out of 142 countries

== Economy ==
- The Wall Street Journal and The Heritage Foundation: Index of Economic Freedom 2015, ranked 27 out of 179 countries
- World Bank: Ease of Doing Business Index 2019, ranked 9 out of 183 countries
- Fraser Institute: Economic Freedom of the World 2015, ranked 27 out of 157
  - Size of Government: ranked 132 out of 157; score of 5.0
  - Legal System and Property Rights: ranked 3 out of 157; score of 8.6
  - Sound Money: ranked 37 out of 157; score of 9.4
  - Freedom to Trade Internationally: ranked 77 out of 157; score of 7.3
  - Regulation: ranked 70 out of 157; score of 7.2
    - Credit market regulations: ranked 1 out of 157; score of 10.0
    - Labor market regulations: ranked 145 out of 157; score of 4.4
    - Business regulations: ranked 22 out of 157; score of 7.2
- World Economic Forum: Global Enabling Trade Report 2014, ranked 12 out of 138; score of 5.1 (out of 7)

== Politics ==
- Transparency International: Corruption Perceptions Index 2019, ranked 7 out of 182.
- Reporters Without Borders: Press Freedom Index 2019/2020, ranked 1 out of 179 countries
- Economist Intelligence Unit: Democracy Index 2019, ranked 1 out of 167; score of 9.87
  - Electoral process and pluralism: ranked 1 out of 167; score of 10.00^{A}
  - Functioning of government: ranked 1 out of 167; score of 9.64
  - Political participation: ranked 1 out of 167; score of 10.00
  - Democratic political culture: ranked 1 out of 167; score of 10.00^{B}
  - Civil liberties: ranked 1 out of 167; score of 10.00^{C}
- Transparency International: Global Corruption Barometer 2013, ranked 6 out of 95; score of 3 (3% of people bribed an official in 2013)
- Democracy Ranking 2015, ranked 1 out of 113; score of 88.1
- World Justice Project: Rule of Law Index 2020, ranked 2 out of 113; score of 0.89 (out of 1)
- Fund for Peace: Fragile States Index 2016, ranked 177 out of 178 (least fragile); score of 18.8 (out of 120)

== Notes ==
A. Tied for 1st place with Finland, Iceland, Luxembourg, New Zealand, and Uruguay.
B. Tied for 1st place with Iceland and Sweden.
C. Tied for 1st place with Australia, Canada, Ireland, New Zealand, and Uruguay.
