= International rankings of the Democratic Republic of the Congo =

These are the international rankings by various organizations of the Democratic Republic of the Congo.

Survey	Year	Ranking	Countries ranked
Corruption Perception Index	2013	154	177
Democracy Index	2011	155	167
Ease of Doing Business Index	2013	183	189
Economic Freedom of the World	2011	144	152
Failed States Index	2013	2nd	178
Global Peace Index	2013	156	162
Globalization Index	2013	167	207
Human Development Index	2011	146	155
ICT Development Index	2011	147	152
Index of Economic Freedom	2013	171	177
Global Innovation Index	2026	137	139
