= Economic Freedom of the World =

Annual survey

- 2021 Economic Freedom of the World report from the Fraser Institute
- Authors: James Gwartney, Robert A. Lawson, Joshua C. Hall, Ryan Murphy, Robbie Butler, John Considine, Hugo J. Faria, Rosemarie Fike, Fred McMahon, Hugo M. Montesinos-Yufa, Dean Stansel, Meg Tuszynski
- Cover artist: Heather Jalbout
- Language: English, French, Spanish, Bosnian, German, Italian
- Publisher: Fraser Institute
- Publication date: 2016
- Publication place: Canada
- ISBN: 978-0-88975-408-9 (2016 edition)
- OCLC: 45197922
- LC Class: HC10 .E3746 HB95E36
- Website: freetheworld.com

Economic Freedom of the World is an annual survey published by the Fraser Institute, a Canadian think tank. The survey attempts to measure the degree of economic freedom in the world's nations. It has been used in peer-reviewed studies, some of which have found a range of beneficial effects of more economic freedom.

== History ==
One of the earliest measures of economic freedom was developed by Freedom House, which has done extensive work on the measurement of political and cultural freedom. This measure incorporated a range of indicators including freedom to establish a business and freedom of union organisation.

Partly in response to dissatisfaction with the Freedom House index from advocates of a libertarian or market liberal viewpoint, Milton Friedman and Michael Walker of the Fraser Institute hosted a series of conferences on economic freedom. Eventually this resulted in a report on worldwide economic freedom, Economic Freedom of the World. The Heritage Foundation and The Wall Street Journal later created another similar index, the Index of Economic Freedom.

== Method ==
The participants in the conferences reached a consensus that the cornerstones of economic freedom are: personal choice rather than collective choice, voluntary exchange coordinated by markets rather than allocation via the political process, freedom to enter and compete in markets, protection of persons and their property from aggression by others. The 2005 report states "When the functions of the minimal state—protection of people and their property from the actions of aggressors, enforcement of contracts, and provision of the limited set of public goods like roads, flood control projects, and money of stable value—are performed well, but the government does little else, a country's rating on the EFW summary index will be high. Correspondingly, as government expenditures increase and regulations expand, a country's rating will decline." In practice, the index measures: size of government (expenditures, taxes, and enterprises, legal structure), security of property rights, access to sound money, freedom to trade internationally, and regulation of credit, labor, and business. The report uses 42 distinct variables, from for example the World Bank, to measure this. Some examples: tax rates, degree of juridical independence, inflation rates, costs of importing, and regulated prices. Each of the 5 areas above is given equal weight in the final score.

== Research ==
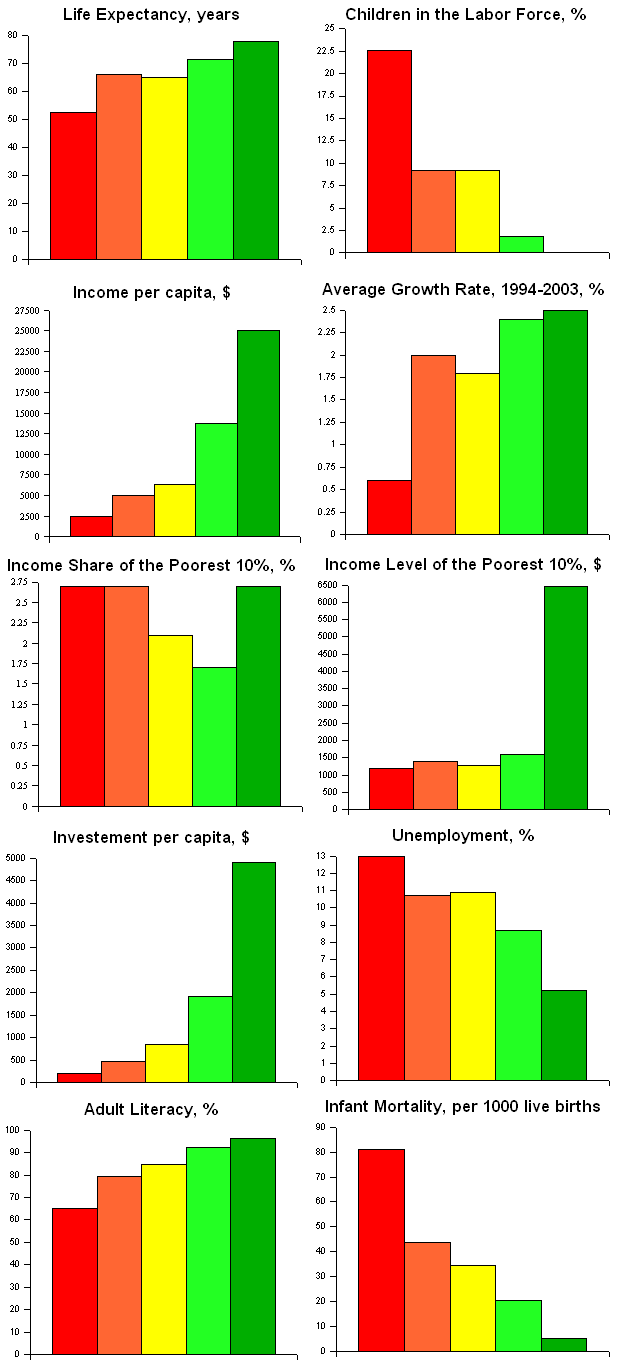
Charts showing economic freedom, as defined in Economic Freedom of the World, and various other indicators. The red bars shows nations with less economic freedom, the green bars those with more.

Economic freedom has been shown to correlate strongly with higher average income per person, higher income of the poorest 10%, higher life expectancy, higher literacy, lower infant mortality, higher access to water sources and less corruption. The share of income in percent going to the poorest 10% is the same for both more and less economically free countries.

The people living in the top one-fifth of the most free countries enjoy an average income of $23,450 and a growth rate in the 1990s of 2.56 percent per year; in contrast, the bottom one-fifth in the rankings had an average income of just $2,556 and a -0.85 percent growth rate in the 1990s. The poorest 10 percent of the population have an average income of just $728 in the least free countries compared with over $7,000 in the most free countries. The life expectancy of people living in the most free nations is 20 years longer than for people in the least free countries.

Higher economic freedom, as measured by both The Heritage Foundation and Fraser Institute indices, correlates strongly with higher self-reported happiness and is significant in preventing wars. Economic freedom is around 54 times more effective than democracy (as measured by Democracy Score) in diminishing violent conflict.

Regarding environmental health, studies have found no or a positive effect. More important may be the Kuznets curve. Most environmental health indicators, such as water and air pollution show an inverted U-shape. Meaning in the beginning of economic development, little weight is given to environmental concerns, raising pollution along with industrialization. After a threshold, when basic physical needs are met and a middle class is established, interest in a clean environment rises, reversing the trend.

Studies show that more economic freedom is the cause of beneficial effects and that Economic Freedom of the World was used for most of the research, partly because Index of Economic Freedom only goes back to 1995 and because it uses more subjective variables.

== Influence ==
Hundreds of peer-reviewed articles have used the index and it has been used in economic research, political science, and environmental research. The Economic Freedom of the World index has been more widely used than any other measure of economic freedom, because of its coverage of a longer time period. In 2016 the report was cited in 412 independent research journals. In 2016 and 2017 Free Malaysia Today and National Review quoted the report.

== Criticisms ==
The correlation between economic freedom and growth has been criticized by studies. De Haan and Siermann find that the relationship is not robust. Heckelman and Stroup argue that the weighting procedure used in the construction of the index is arbitrary. They examine the components of the index individually and find that many—including a low top marginal tax rate—are negatively, rather than positively correlated with economic growth. A frequent criticism is that China, and other developing nations, have high growth rates but relatively low economic freedom. Developing nations can have higher growth rates than developed nations, as they have cheap labor and can import investment, technology and organizational skills from rich countries.

When examining the subcomponents of the index, any positive effect that a low level of taxes might have is more disputed than the importance of rule of law, lack of political corruption, low inflation, and functioning property rights. Many northern European nations such as Iceland (#23), Denmark (#13), Finland (#21) and Sweden (#35), have extensive welfare states, which are strongly opposed by advocates of laissez-faire. It is argued these countries have less regulation than most others, and research using the Ease of Doing Business Index suggests that the effect of business regulations is more important than government consumption. The Global Competitiveness Report looks at several other factors that affect economic growth such as infrastructure, health, and education.

Although the World Bank does not believe that laissez-faire policies, if they allow large inequalities of wealth to develop, are an effective way to achieve this goal, it is a strong supporter of the importance of economic growth for reducing poverty. It argues that an overview of many studies shows that: growth is fundamental for poverty reduction, and in principle growth as such does not seem to affect inequality, growth accompanied by a more egalitarian distribution of wealth is better than growth alone, high initial income inequality is a brake on poverty reduction, poverty itself is also likely to be a barrier for poverty reduction, and wealth inequality seems to predict lower future growth rates. In 2011, the IMF Economic Review published an article that found countries with higher economic freedom and more liberal credit market regulation suffered more in output growth during the Great Recession. In 2014, a working paper published by the International Labour Organization said some of the methodology used in the Rigidity of Employment index sub-components, was not useful.

== 2017 ratings in 2019 Annual Report ==
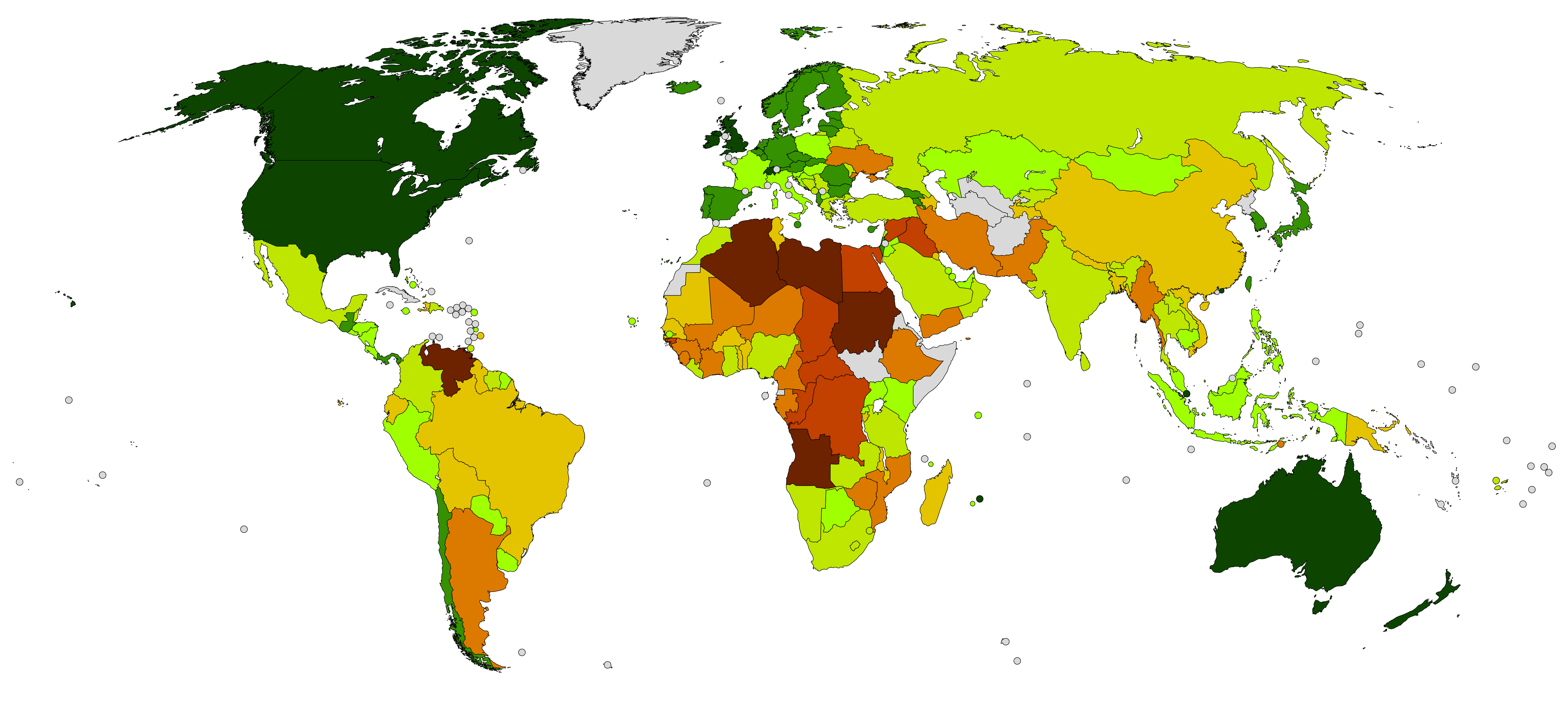
Map showing summary index scores of countries according to 2017 data from the 2019 Annual Report: >8 7.5–8 7–7.5 / 6.5–7 6–6.5 5.5–6 / 5–5.5 <5 Data unavailable

Below are the ratings of countries for 2017, based on the 2019 Annual Report. In 2017, Hong Kong and Singapore were in first and second place respectively; the next highest-scoring countries are New Zealand, Switzerland, the United States, Ireland, the United Kingdom, Canada, Australia and Mauritius. The lowest-scoring countries are Iraq, the Republic of the Congo, Egypt, Syria, the Democratic Republic of the Congo, Angola, Algeria, Sudan, Libya, and lastly, Venezuela.

Rank	Country	Summary index
1	Hong Kong	8.91
2	Singapore	8.71
3	New Zealand	8.50
4	Switzerland	8.40
5	United States	8.19
6	Ireland	8.13
7	United Kingdom	8.09
8	Canada	8.08
9	Australia	8.07
9	Mauritius	8.07
11	Malta	7.97
12	Georgia	7.94
13	Chile	7.89
13	Denmark	7.89
13	Estonia	7.89
16	Lithuania	7.88
17	Japan	7.86
17	Luxembourg	7.86
19	Taiwan	7.85
20	Germany	7.82
21	Finland	7.80
22	Czech Republic	7.75
23	Iceland	7.74
24	Latvia	7.73
25	Netherlands	7.72
26	Austria	7.71
27	Armenia	7.70
28	Cyprus	7.68
28	Romania	7.68
30	Albania	7.67
31	Panama	7.66
32	Norway	7.62
33	South Korea	7.59
34	Guatemala	7.57
35	Sweden	7.56
36	Spain	7.55
37	Bulgaria	7.54
38	Israel	7.53
39	Portugal	7.52
40	Belgium	7.51
40	Slovakia	7.51
42	Peru	7.49
43	Cambodia	7.44
43	Jordan	7.44
45	Mongolia	7.43
46	Costa Rica	7.41
46	Italy	7.41
48	Uganda	7.39
49	Botswana	7.37
50	Bahrain	7.35
50	France	7.35
52	Malaysia	7.34
53	Philippines	7.32
54	Hungary	7.27
54	Indonesia	7.27
56	Croatia	7.26
56	Rwanda	7.26
58	Bahamas	7.25
59	Poland	7.24
60	Gambia	7.23
61	Jamaica	7.17
61	United Arab Emirates	7.17
63	Cape Verde	7.16
63	El Salvador	7.16
65	Honduras	7.16
65	Seychelles	7.16
67	Slovenia	7.15
68	Kazakhstan	7.10
69	Qatar	7.07
70	Kenya	7.05
70	Uruguay	7.05
72	Paraguay	7.03
73	Republic of Macedonia	7.02
74	Nicaragua	7.01
75	Lebanon	6.97
76	Mexico	6.93
77	Dominican Republic	6.92
77	Kyrgyzstan	6.92
79	India	6.91
80	Serbia	6.89
81	Nigeria	6.86
81	Thailand	6.86
83	Montenegro	6.84
83	Zambia	6.84
85	Belize	6.78
85	Russia	6.78
87	Bhutan	6.77
87	Tanzania	6.77
89	Oman	6.76
90	Fiji	6.74
91	Trinidad and Tobago	6.70
92	Bosnia and Herzegovina	6.69
92	Morocco	6.69
94	Colombia	6.68
95	Laos	6.67
95	Turkey	6.67
97	Moldova	6.66
98	Suriname	6.65
99	Belarus	6.64
100	Brunei	6.62
101	South Africa	6.61
102	Greece	6.59
103	Ghana	6.58
104	Sri Lanka	6.57
105	Liberia	6.56
106	Namibia	6.53
107	Saudi Arabia	6.52
107	Swaziland	6.52
109	Lesotho	6.50
110	Haiti	6.49
110	Nepal	6.49
112	Barbados	6.45
113	China	6.42
114	Kuwait	6.41
115	Papua New Guinea	6.36
116	Azerbaijan	6.34
117	Guyana	6.32
118	Ecuador	6.28
119	Vietnam	6.27
120	Brazil	6.23
121	Togo	6.21
122	Tunisia	6.20
123	Bangladesh	6.18
124	Burundi	6.17
124	Senegal	6.17
126	Bolivia	6.14
126	Madagascar	6.14
128	Mauritania	6.11
129	Benin	6.08
130	Burkina Faso	6.07
131	Malawi	6.06
132	Tajikistan	6.05
133	East Timor	5.99
134	Ivory Coast	5.97
135	Ukraine	5.96
136	Mali	5.91
136	Pakistan	5.91
138	Gabon	5.88
139	Guinea	5.86
140	Cameroon	5.84
140	Yemen	5.84
142	Niger	5.83
143	Ethiopia	5.72
143	Iran	5.72
145	Zimbabwe	5.69
146	Argentina	5.67
147	Myanmar	5.63
148	Sierra Leone	5.63
149	Mozambique	5.60
150	Chad	5.42
151	Central African Republic	5.23
151	Guinea-Bissau	5.23
153	Iraq	5.21
154	Republic of the Congo	5.08
155	Egypt	5.05
155	Syria	5.05
157	Democratic Republic of the Congo	5.00
158	Angola	4.83
159	Algeria	4.77
160	Sudan	4.67
161	Libya	4.45
162	Venezuela	2.58

== Past reports ==
=== Trend ===
The Economic Freedom of the World 2005 report stated that the world economic freedom score has grown considerably over the last few decades. By its measure, the average score has increased from 5.17 in 1985 to 6.4. Of the nations in 1985, 95 nations increased their score, seven saw a decline, and six were unchanged.

=== 2013 ratings in 2015 Annual Report ===
Economic Freedom Ratings for 2013, including 157 countries and 119 positions which may be shared by two or more countries.

Rank	Country	Summary index	Previous rank	Difference
1	Hong Kong	8.97	8.97	0
2	Singapore	8.52	8.73	▼0.21
3	New Zealand	8.19	8.49	▼0.30
4	Switzerland	8.16	8.30	▼0.14
5	United Arab Emirates	8.15	8.07	▲0.08
6	Mauritius	8.08	8.01	▲0.07
7	Jordan	7.93	7.81	▲0.12
8	Ireland	7.90	7.66	▲0.24
9	Canada	7.89	7.93	▼0.08
10	Chile	7.87	7.87	0
11	United Kingdom	7.87	7.85	▲0.02
12	Australia	7.83	7.88	▼0.05
13	Georgia	7.83	7.61	▲0.22
14	Qatar	7.77	7.62	▲0.15
15	Taiwan	7.76	7.77	▼0.01
16	United States	7.73	7.73	0
17	Romania	7.69	7.32	▲0.17
18	Armenia	7.67	7.62	▲0.05
19	Finland	7.61	7.98	▼0.37
20	Lithuania	7.61	7.61	0
21	Malta	7.61	7.65	▼0.04
22	Denmark	7.58	7.78	▼0.20
23	Estonia	7.58	7.76	▼0.18
24	Bahrain	7.55	7.93	▼0.38
25	Costa Rica	7.53	7.11	▲0.42
26	Japan	7.52	7.50	▲0.02
27	Luxembourg	7.51	7.49	▲0.02
28	Norway	7.51	7.56	▼0.05
29	Germany	7.50	7.68	▼0.18
30	Netherlands	7.48	7.57	▼0.09
31	Austria	7.46	7.59	▼0.13
32	Kuwait	7.46	7.22	▲0.24
33	Guatemala	7.45	7.21	▲0.14
34	Rwanda	7.43	7.46	▼0.03
35	Latvia	7.42	7.31	▲0.11
36	Portugal	7.42	7.34	▲0.09
37	Bahamas	7.40	7.40	0
38	Nicaragua	7.40	7.23	▲0.17
39	Israel	7.38	7.26	▲0.12
40	South Korea	7.38	7.50	▼0.22
41	Peru	7.34	7.64	▼0.30
42	Bulgaria	7.33	7.26	▲0.07
43	Czech Republic	7.33	7.25	▲0.18
44	Jamaica	7.33	7.12	▲0.21
45	Sweden	7.33	7.59	▼0.16
46	Uganda	7.30	7.10	▲0.20
47	Poland	7.29	7.20	▲0.09
48	Slovakia	7.29	7.46	▼0.17
49	Honduras	7.27	7.21	▲0.06
50	Panama	7.27	7.08	▲0.19
51	Spain	7.27	7.53	▼0.26
52	Belgium	7.26	7.36	▼0.10
53	Cambodia	7.26	7.02	▲0.24
54	Kazakhstan	7.26	6.84	▲0.42
55	El Salvador	7.25	7.03	▲0.22
56	Hungary	7.25	7.59	▼0.34
57	Dominican Republic	7.23	7.13	▲0.10
58	Malaysia	7.22	7.06	▲0.16
59	Oman	7.21	7.31	▼0.10
60	Republic of Macedonia	7.19	7.05	▲0.14
61	Mongolia	7.19	7.06	▲0.13
62	Albania	7.18	7.27	▼0.09
63	Brunei	7.18	7.05	▲0.13
64	Montenegro	7.18	7.26	▼0.08
65	Uruguay	7.18	7.35	▼0.17
66	Kenya	7.16	6.81	▲0.35
67	Philippines	7.14	7.21	▼0.07
68	Botswana	7.13	7.25	▼0.12
69	Italy	7.13	6.85	▲0.28
70	France	7.12	7.38	▼0.26
71	Gambia	7.12	6.98	▲0.14
72	Papua New Guinea	7.11	6.96	▲0.15
73	Seychelles	7.07	—N/a	-
74	Trinidad and Tobago	7.07	6.95	▲0.12
75	Cyprus	7.03	7.72	▼0.69
76	Indonesia	7.01	6.90	▲0.11
77	Lebanon	7.01	7.41	▼0.40
78	Bosnia and Herzegovina	6.98	6.67	▲0.25
79	Cape Verde	6.97	6.24	▲0.69
80	Zambia	6.97	7.10	▼0.13
81	Saudi Arabia	6.95	7.14	▼0.19
82	Tanzania	6.92	6.65	▲0.27
83	Turkey	6.92	7.06	▼0.14
84	Croatia	6.91	7.01	▼0.10
85	Greece	6.87	6.83	▲0.24
86	Iceland	6.87	7.37	▼0.50
87	Bhutan	6.86	—N/a	-
88	Fiji	6.86	7.10	▼0.14
89	Paraguay	6.85	6.78	▲0.07
90	Barbados	6.83	6.96	▼0.13
91	Haiti	6.83	6.56	▲0.33
92	Tajikistan	6.81	6.01	▲0.80
93	Mexico	6.79	6.64	▲0.15
94	Swaziland	6.79	6.56	▲0.23
95	Suriname	6.77	6.29	▲0.48
96	South Africa	6.74	6.80	▼0.06
97	Kyrgyzstan	6.73	6.51	▲0.22
98	Madagascar	6.71	6.37	▲0.34
99	Russia	6.69	6.55	▲0.14
100	Namibia	6.68	6.39	▲0.38
101	Serbia	6.65	6.46	▲0.19
102	Belize	6.64	6.82	▼0.18
103	Moldova	6.63	6.86	▼0.23
104	Thailand	6.63	6.64	▼0.01
105	Sri Lanka	6.57	6.66	▼0.09
106	Colombia	6.56	6.61	▼0.05
107	Nepal	6.56	6.19	▲0.36
108	Bolivia	6.52	6.36	▲0.16
109	Morocco	6.46	6.56	▼0.10
110	Vietnam	6.46	6.23	▲0.23
111	China	6.44	6.22	▲0.22
112	Nigeria	6.44	6.21	▲0.23
113	Slovenia	6.44	6.59	▼0.15
114	India	6.43	6.34	▲0.09
115	Bangladesh	6.42	6.33	▲0.09
116	Tunisia	6.39	6.87	▼0.52
117	Lesotho	6.36	6.35	▲0.01
118	Azerbaijan	6.34	6.30	▲0.34
119	Brazil	6.34	6.51	▼0.17
120	Cameroon	6.34	5.94	▲0.40
121	Egypt	6.34	6.36	▼0.02
122	Senegal	6.32	5.97	▲0.35
123	Mali	6.29	5.95	▲0.74
124	Guyana	6.28	6.34	▼0.06
125	Pakistan	6.28	6.34	▼0.06
126	Yemen	6.28	6.31	▼0.03
127	Timor-Leste	6.27	6.30	▼0.03
128	Ghana	6.20	6.71	▼0.51
129	Ukraine	6.20	6.16	▲0.04
130	Guinea-Bissau	6.12	5.68	▲0.44
131	Burkina Faso	6.10	5.94	▲0.16
132	Sierra Leone	6.08	6.32	▼0.24
133	Benin	6.05	5.95	▲0.10
134	Ivory Coast	6.03	5.76	▲0.37
135	Ecuador	5.99	5.85	▲0.14
136	Malawi	5.87	6.30	▼0.43
137	Mozambique	5.87	5.63	▲0.24
138	Burundi	5.85	5.26	▲0.59
139	Mauritania	5.79	6.42	▼0.63
140	Niger	5.79	5.60	▲0.19
141	Gabon	5.72	5.73	▼0.01
142	Togo	5.71	5.57	▲0.14
143	Ethiopia	5.68	5.47	▲0.21
144	Belgian Congo	5.65	5.28	▲0.37
145	Guinea	5.62	—N/a	-
146	Myanmar	5.56	4.08	▲1.48
147	Iran	5.43	6.05	▼0.22
148	Angola	5.37	5.17	▲0.20
149	Zimbabwe	5.33	4.59	▲0.34
150	Central African Republic	5.29	5.26	▲0.03
151	Algeria	5.20	5.32	▼0.12
152	Argentina	5.20	5.69	▼0.49
153	Syria	5.19	—N/a	-
154	Chad	5.13	4.98	▲0.15
155	Libya	5.11	—N/a	-
156	Republic of the Congo	4.72	4.57	▲0.15
157	Venezuela	3.23	3.93	▼0.70

== Related indices ==
A related index for Chinese provinces is followed by both Chinese scholars and policy makers. There is also a network of institutions in 59 different nations that use the index to promote free market ideas.

== See also ==
- Indices of economic freedom
- List of indices of freedom
- List of countries by economic freedom
- List of countries by inequality-adjusted HDI (Human Development Index)
