= Doing business =

Doing Business may refer to:

- Doing business as (DBA), a legal term
- Doing Business Report, World Bank Group's yearly study of private sector development
