= Niels Veldhuis =

Canadian economist

- Born: 1975 or 1976 (age 49–50)
- Education: Simon Fraser University (BA, MA)
- Occupation: Economist

Niels Veldhuis is a Canadian economist who has been serving as the president of the Fraser Institute since 2012.

== Background ==
Veldhuis graduated from South Delta Secondary School in Tsawwassen, British Columbia, in 1994. He graduated from Simon Fraser University with a joint major in business and economics in 1999. He completed his master's degree in economics at the same university immediately afterwards.

== Career ==
After graduating from university, Veldhuis became an economics lecturer at Kwantlen Polytechnic University.

=== Fraser Institute ===
In 2002 he was hired for a research position at the Fraser Institute, a free market and libertarian-conservative think tank. Veldhuis still continued lecturing for several years until he resigned entirely to devote more time to the think tank's work. In the spring of 2012, Veldhuis became president of the institute.

In 2012, in response to reports from The Vancouver Observer that the Fraser Institute was receiving millions of dollars of funding from foreign sources, Veldhuis argued the think tank does accept foreign funding, though declined to comment on any specific donors or details about the donations.

=== Other work ===
Veldhuis has frequently appeared on committees of both the House of Commons and Senate, providing input on government economic policy. In 2011, Veldhuis hosted a discussion between former American presidents Bill Clinton and George W. Bush at the Surrey Economic Forum.

In 2010, Veldhuis was named as one of Business in Vancouver's top 40 under 40.

== Published works ==
- Tax Facts 13 (2003)
- Tax Facts 14 (2006)
- Saskatchewan Prosperity: Building on Success (2009)
- The Canadian Century: Moving Out of America's Shadow (2010)
- Learning from the Past: How Canadian Fiscal Policies of the 1990s Can Be Applied Today (2011)
