= Economic freedom =

Ability to make economic choices freely

Economic freedom, or economic liberty, is the agency of people to make economic decisions. This is a term used in economic and policy debates as well as in the philosophy of economics. One approach to economic freedom comes from the liberal tradition emphasizing free markets, free trade, and private property. Another approach to economic freedom extends the welfare economics study of individual choice, with greater economic freedom coming from a larger set of possible choices. Other conceptions of economic freedom include freedom from want and the freedom to engage in collective bargaining.

The liberal free-market viewpoint defines economic liberty as the freedom to produce, trade and consume any goods and services acquired without the use of force, fraud, theft or government regulation. This is embodied in the rule of law, property rights and freedom of contract, and characterized by external and internal openness of the markets, the protection of property rights and freedom of economic initiative. There are several indices of economic freedom that attempt to measure free market economic freedom. Based on these rankings, correlative studies have found higher economic growth to be correlated with higher scores on the country rankings. Critics of this approach, such as Fredrik Carlsson and Susanna Lundström, have argued that the economic freedom indices conflate unrelated policies and policy outcomes in order to conceal negative correlations between economic growth and free-market policies, such as counting lower corruption as an indicator of economic freedom.

== Socialist viewpoints ==
The socialist view of economic freedom conceives of freedom as a concrete situation as opposed to an abstract or moral concept. This view of freedom is closely related to the socialist view of human creativity and the importance ascribed to creative freedom. Socialists view creativity as an essential aspect of human nature, thus defining freedom as a situation or state of being where individuals are able to express their creativity unhindered by constraints of both material scarcity and coercive social institutions. Marxists stress the importance of freeing the individual from what they view as coercive, exploitative and alienating social relationships of production they are compelled to partake in, as well as the importance of economic development as providing the material basis for the existence of a state of society where there are enough resources to allow for each individual to pursue his or her genuine creative interests.

== Liberal viewpoint ==
=== Institutions of economic freedom ===
==== Private property rights ====
According to the liberal free-market view, a secure system of private property rights is a necessary part of economic freedom. Such systems include two main rights, namely the right to control and benefit from property and the right to transfer property by voluntary means. David A. Harper argues that a system of private property is required for entrepreneurship, because "entrepreneurs would not be able to formulate or carry out their plans unless they were reasonably sure that the people with whom they trade have exclusive control over the relevant resources." Bernard H. Siegan holds that a secure system of property rights also reduces uncertainty and encourages investments, creating favorable conditions for an economy to be successful. According to Hernando de Soto, much of the poverty in Third World countries is caused by a lack of Western systems of laws and well-defined and universally recognized property rights. De Soto argues that because of legal barriers and because it is often unclear who owns what property, poor people in those countries cannot utilize their assets to produce more wealth. In the 1960s, Alan Greenspan argued that economic freedom requires the gold standard for protection of savings from inflation.

David L. Weimer, surveying a series of empirical studies about economic growth, reports that "a number of economic historians have noted the importance of credible property rights, especially in terms of freedom from arbitrary seizures of property by governments, for understanding relative rates of growth in different time periods and regions," and concludes that countries with strong property rights systems have economic growth rates almost twice as high as those of countries with weak property rights systems. At the same time, he notes that the risk of unexpected seizure, and not state ownership in and of itself, is responsible for this outcome, saying: "the degree of state ownership of property does not have a statistically significant effect on growth rates after controlling for the risk of seizure."

==== Freedom of contract ====
Freedom of contract is the right to choose one's contracting parties and to trade with them on any terms and conditions one sees fit. Contracts permit individuals to create their own enforceable legal rules, adapted to their unique situations. Disputes arising from contracts are typically resolved by the judiciary branch of government, but not all contracts need to be enforced by the state. For example, in the United States there is a large number of third-party arbitration tribunals which resolve disputes under private commercial law. Negatively understood, freedom of contract is freedom from government interference and from imposed value judgments of fairness. The notion of "freedom of contract" was given one of its most famous legal expressions in 1875 by Sir George Jessel MR:

[I]f there is one thing more than another public policy requires it is that men of full age and competent understanding shall have the utmost liberty of contracting, and that their contracts when entered into freely and voluntarily shall be held sacred and shall be enforced by courts of justice. Therefore, you have this paramount public policy to consider – that you are not lightly to interfere with this freedom of contract.

In the United States, courts have at times stated that the U.S. Constitution protects the freedom of contract. For example, in the case of Lochner v. New York the U.S. Supreme Court struck down legal restrictions on the working hours of bakers because under the facts of the case the court found the hours "not dangerous in any degree to morals or in any real and substantial degree to the health of the employees." Instead, the court stated that "other motives" underlay the law, by which it seemed to mean protectionism against small bakeries and their non-unionized employees.

Critics of the classical view of freedom of contract argue that this freedom is illusory when the bargaining power of the parties is highly unequal, most notably in the case of contracts between employers and workers. The argument is that workers as a group may benefit from legal protections that prevent individuals agreeing to contracts that require long working hours. In its West Coast Hotel Co. v. Parrish decision in 1937, the Supreme Court retrenched on some of its previous caselaw protecting the freedom of contract.

Since then, the U.S. Supreme Court has been extremely hesitant to protect economic freedom under the due process clauses of the U.S. Constitution, as it did in Lochner. It has, however, sometimes protected economic freedom in other ways, including through the dormant Commerce Clause doctrine and the First Amendment through protection of commercial speech. And lower courts, including state courts, have protected economic freedom at times through due process clauses and similar constitutional provisions. For example, in 2023 the Georgia Supreme Court found that a law requiring lactation consultants to have a state-mandated license violated the state constitution.

=== Economic and political freedom ===
Some free market advocates argue that political and civil liberties have simultaneously expanded with market-based economies, and present empirical evidence to support the claim that economic and political freedoms are linked.

In Capitalism and Freedom (1962), Friedman further developed Friedrich Hayek's argument that economic freedom, while itself an extremely important component of total freedom, is also a necessary condition for political freedom. He commented that centralized control of economic activities was always accompanied with political repression. In his view, voluntary character of all transactions in a free market economy and wide diversity that it permits are fundamental threats to repressive political leaders and greatly diminish power to coerce. Through elimination of centralized control of economic activities, economic power is separated from political power, and the one can serve as counterbalance to the other. Friedman feels that competitive capitalism is especially important to minority groups, since impersonal market forces protect people from discrimination in their economic activities for reasons unrelated to their productivity.

Austrian School economist Ludwig von Mises argued that economic and political freedom were mutually dependent: "The idea that political freedom can be preserved in the absence of economic freedom, and vice versa, is an illusion. Political freedom is the corollary of economic freedom. It is no accident that the age of capitalism became also the age of government by the people."

In The Road to Serfdom, Hayek argued that "Economic control is not merely control of a sector of human life which can be separated from the rest; it is the control of the means for all our ends." Hayek criticized socialist policies as the slippery slope that can lead to totalitarianism.

Gordon Tullock has argued that "the Hayek-Friedman argument" predicted totalitarian governments in much of Western Europe in the late 20th century – which did not occur. He uses the example of Sweden, in which the government at that time controlled 63 percent of GNP, as an example to support his argument that the basic problem with The Road to Serfdom is "that it offered predictions which turned out to be false. The steady advance of government in places such as Sweden has not led to any loss of non-economic freedoms." While criticizing Hayek, Tullock still praises the classical liberal notion of economic freedom, saying, "Arguments for political freedom are strong, as are the arguments for economic freedom. We needn't make one set of arguments depend on the other."

=== Indices of economic freedom ===
The annual surveys Economic Freedom of the World (EFW) and Index of Economic Freedom (IEF) are two indices which attempt to measure the degree of economic freedom in the world's nations. The EFW index, originally developed by Gwartney, Lawson and Block at the Fraser Institute was likely the most used in empirical studies as of 2000.

The Economic Freedom of the World score for the entire world has grown considerably in recent decades. The average score has increased from 5.17 in 1985 to 6.4 in 2005. Of the nations in 1985, 95 nations increased their score, seven saw a decline, and six were unchanged. Using the 2008 Index of Economic Freedom methodology world economic freedom has increased 2.6 points since 1995.

Members of the World Bank Group also use Index of Economic Freedom as the indicator of investment climate, because it covers more aspects relevant to the private sector in wide number of countries.

==== Criticism ====
The nature of economic freedom is often in dispute. Robert Lawson, the co-author of EFW, even acknowledges the potential shortcomings of freedom indices: "The purpose of the EFW index is to measure, no doubt imprecisely, the degree of economic freedom that exists." He likens the recent attempts of economists to measure economic freedom to the initial attempts of economists to measure GDP: "They [macroeconomists] were scientists who sat down to design, as best they could with the tools at hand, a measure of the current economic activity of the nation. Economic activity exists and their job was to measure it. Likewise economic freedom exists. It is a thing. We can define and measure it." Thus, it follows that some economists, socialists and anarchists contend that the existing indicators of economic freedom are too narrowly defined and should take into account a broader conception of economic freedoms.

Critics of the indices (e.g. Thom Hartmann) also oppose the inclusion of business-related measures like corporate charters and intellectual property protection. John Miller in Dollars & Sense has stated that the indices are "a poor barometer of either freedom more broadly construed or of prosperity." He argues that the high correlation between living standards and economic freedom as measured by IEF is the result of choices made in the construction of the index that guarantee this result. For example, the treatment of a large informal sector (common in poor countries) as an indicator of restrictive government policy, and the use of the change in the ratio of government spending to national income, rather than the level of this ratio. Hartmann argues that these choices cause the social democratic European countries to rank higher than countries where the government share of the economy is small but growing.

Economists Dani Rodrik and Jeffrey Sachs have separately noted that there appears to be little correlation between measured economic freedom and economic growth when the least free countries are disregarded, as indicated by the strong growth of the Chinese economy in recent years. Morris Altman found that there is a relatively large correlation between economic freedom and both per capita income and per capita growth. He argues that this is especially true when it comes to sub-indices relating to property rights and sound money, while he calls into question the importance of sub-indices relating to labor regulation and government size once certain threshold values are passed. John Miller further observes that Hong Kong and Singapore, both only "partially free" according to Freedom House, are leading countries on both economic freedom indices and casts doubt on the claim that measured economic freedom is associated with political freedom. However, according to the Freedom House, "there is a high and statistically significant correlation between the level of political freedom as measured by Freedom House and economic freedom as measured by the Wall Street Journal/Heritage Foundation survey."

== Choice sets and economic freedom ==
Amartya Sen and other economists consider economic freedom to be measured in terms of the set of economic choices available to individuals. Economic freedom is greater when individuals have more economic choices available – when, in some technical sense, the choice set of individuals expands.

=== Positive and negative freedom ===
The differences between alternative views of economic freedom have been expressed in terms of Isaiah Berlin's distinction between positive freedom and negative freedom. Classical liberals favour a focus on negative freedom as did Berlin himself. By contrast Amartya Sen argues for an understanding of freedom in terms of capabilities to pursue a range of goals. One measure which attempts to assess freedom in the positive sense is Goodin, Rice, Parpo, and Eriksson's measure of discretionary time, which is an estimate of how much time people have at their disposal during which they are free to choose the activities in which they participate, after taking into account the time they need to spend acquiring the necessities of life. In his book, Capitalism and Freedom, Milton Friedman explains the preservation of freedom is the reason for limited and decentralized governments. It creates positive freedom within the society allowing for freedom of choice for an individual in a free society.

== Freedom from want ==
Franklin D. Roosevelt included freedom from want in his 1941 Four Freedoms speech, stating that it "translated into world terms, means economic understandings which will secure to every nation a healthy peacetime life for its inhabitants – everywhere in the world". In US policy, Roosevelt's New Deal included such the right of trade union organization, alongside government intervention and redistributive taxation. Internationally, Roosevelt supported the Bretton Woods system of fixed exchange rates and institutions such as the World Bank and International Monetary Fund.

Classical liberals and Austrian School economists, such as Friedrich Hayek and Ludwig von Mises, argued that true freedom from want is best achieved through negative liberties: property rights, freedom of contract, and open markets, rather than positive entitlements enforced by state planning. They contended that interventionist policies risk distorting incentives, leading to the economic calculation problem and reduced prosperity. Milton Friedman similarly emphasized in Capitalism and Freedom that economic freedom, i.e. limited government, underpins both negative and positive aspects of liberty by expanding choices and growth.

Herbert Hoover saw economic freedom as a fifth freedom, which secures survival of Roosevelt's Four freedoms. He described economic freedom as freedom "for men to choose their own calling, to accumulate property in protection of their children and old age, [and] freedom of enterprise that does not injure others."

== Freedom of association and unions ==
The Philadelphia Declaration (enshrined in the constitution of the International Labour Organization) states that "all human beings, irrespective of race, creed or sex, have the right to pursue both their material well-being and their spiritual development in conditions of freedom and dignity, of economic security and equal opportunity." The ILO further states that "The right of workers and employers to form and join organizations of their own choosing is an integral part of a free and open society."

== Socioeconomic impact of economic freedom ==
One of the ways to measure economic competitiveness is by comparing an extent of economic freedom that countries have, which as surveys show can also largely explain differences in economic well-being across the world. Generally, countries with higher economic freedom have higher gross domestic product per capita and its growth rates, as well as better health care, education quality, environment protection, income equality, and happiness results. These trends of increasing prosperity are confirmed even when we compare these indicators within territories of countries. Nevertheless, despite these benefits societies have to be aware that with increasing economic freedom they will have to face going through a phase of increasing inequality, which basically is a result of decreased redistribution, as well as other negative effects from economic liberalization, i.e., running of local enterprises out of business, takeover of competitive firms, enforcing of interests of foreign companies, dependence on foreign capital, deteriorating work rights, harmful manufacturing for the environment, introducing of commercial practices that are not favorable for consumers, as well as endangerment for survival of national cultures. However, these negative effects from economic freedom tend to be felt in a shorter term, and if countries use the opportunities of economic freedom in our increasingly globalized economy in a right way, as research shows their socioeconomic conditions will be significantly better than in a case of less economic freedom.

== See also ==
- Anglo-Saxon model
- Capitalism and Freedom
- Economic liberalism
- Economic liberalization
- Economic Freedom of the World
- Economic, social and cultural rights
- Free association
- Free to Choose
- Freedom dividend
- Four Freedoms (European Union)
- Index of Economic Freedom
- Indices of economic freedom
- List of indices of freedom
- Laissez-faire
- List of countries by economic freedom
- Universal basic income
