= Starting a Business Index =

Sub-index of the World Bank Ease of Doing Business Index

The Starting a Business Index is a sub-index of the World Bank Ease of Doing Business Index.

== Authors of the methodology ==
This methodology was developed by Simeon Djankov, Rafael La Porta, Florencio Lopez-De-Silanes and Andrei Shleifer in a paper, "The Regulation of Entry".

Djankov is the creator of the annual Doing Business report, once a publication of the World Bank Group. The report was discontinued in 2021.

== Ranking ==
Ranking of all nations from 2010 report The 2019 ranking has New Zealand at the top again.

2010 Rank	2009 Rank	Country
1	1	New Zealand
2	2	Canada
3	3	Australia
4	4	Singapore
5	5	Georgia
6	13	Macedonia
7	98	Belarus
8	6	United States
9	7	Ireland
10	8	Mauritius
11	64	Rwanda
12	60	Madagascar
13	31	Saudi Arabia
14	34	Kyrgyzstan
15	10	Puerto Rico
16	9	United Kingdom
17	11	Azerbaijan
18	16	Hong Kong
19	12	Jamaica
20	131	Samoa
21	65	Armenia
22	14	France
23	24	Afghanistan
24	43	Egypt
25	15	Cyprus
26	42	Slovenia
27	17	Panama
28	18	Denmark
29	119	Taiwan
30	20	Finland
31	21	Belgium
32	22	Tonga
33	19	Iceland
34	28	Israel
35	25	Norway
36	36	Saint Lucia
37	23	Estonia
38	26	Dominica
39	29	Hungary
39	27	Marshall Islands
41	33	Sri Lanka
42	30	Romania
43	32	Sweden
44	118	United Arab Emirates
45	41	Saint Vincent and the Grenadines
46	68	Albania
47	38	Tunisia
48	73	Iran
49	37	Maldives
50	81	Bulgaria
51	35	Latvia
52	40	Grenada
53	133	North Korea
53	53	Yemen
55	46	Thailand
56	44	Turkey
57	62	Liberia
58	58	Sierra Leone
59	47	Antigua and Barbuda
60	39	Portugal
61	48	Bahamas
62	78	Oman
63	50	Bahrain
63	80	Pakistan
65	56	Trinidad and Tobago
66	49	Slovakia
67	45	South Africa
68	57	Qatar
69	55	Chile
70	51	Netherlands
71	52	Switzerland
72	70	Luxembourg
73	108	Serbia
74	82	Colombia
75	54	Italy
76	59	Morocco
77	90	Moldova
78	61	Mongolia
79	62	Micronesia
80	66	Bhutan
81	69	Seychelles
82	79	Kazakhstan
83	83	Botswana
84	101	Germany
85	107	Montenegro
86	74	Saint Kitts and Nevis
87	75	Nepal
88	76	Malaysia
89	85	Laos
90	114	Mexico
91	67	Japan
92	71	Uzbekistan
93	122	Ethiopia
94	72	Zambia
95	87	Nicaragua
96	143	Mozambique
97	103	Guyana
98	93	Bangladesh
99	77	Lithuania
100	89	Paraguay
101	100	Croatia
102	94	Senegal
103	84	Palau
104	92	Fiji
104	96	Papua New Guinea
106	88	Russia
107	86	Dominican Republic
108	99	Lebanon
108	95	Nigeria
110	97	Vanuatu
111	104	Solomon Islands
112	117	Peru
113	91	Czech Republic
114	102	Gambia
115	115	Burkina Faso
116	109	Vietnam
117	145	Poland
118	111	Sudan
119	111	Kiribati
120	111	Tanzania
121	105	El Salvador
122	106	Austria
123	116	Namibia
124	110	Kenya
125	119	Jordan
126	127	Brazil
127	123	Costa Rica
128	124	Malawi
129	129	Uganda
130	132	Burundi
131	128	Lesotho
132	121	Uruguay
133	125	Syria
134	126	Ukraine
135	136	Ghana
136	164	Cape Verde
137	134	Kuwait
138	135	Argentina
139	157	Mali
140	130	Greece
140	136	São Tomé and Príncipe
142	141	Venezuela
143	169	Tajikistan
144	146	Honduras
145	144	Zimbabwe
146	139	Spain
147	138	Belize
148	141	Algeria
149	140	Mauritania
150	150	Timor-Leste
151	152	China
152	147	Gabon
153	149	Brunei
154	153	DR Congo
155	151	Benin
156	147	Guatemala
157	161	Niger
158	154	Swaziland
159	168	Central African Republic
160	162	Bosnia and Herzegovina
161	173	Indonesia
162	155	Philippines
163	160	Ecuador
164	156	Kosovo
165	158	Angola
166	159	Congo
167	165	Bolivia
168	163	Comoros
169	166	India
170	181	Togo
171	172	Suriname
172	170	Ivory Coast
173	171	Cambodia
174	174	Cameroon
175	177	Iraq
176	167	Palestine
177	175	Djibouti
178	176	Equatorial Guinea
179	178	Guinea
180	179	Haiti
181	180	Eritrea
182	182	Chad
183	183	Guinea-Bissau

== See also ==
- Barriers to entry
- Commercial law
