= Indices of economic freedom =

A number of indicators of economic freedom are available for review. They differ in the methods by which they have been constructed, the purposes to which they have been put, and the conception of economic freedom they embody.

== Indices ==
=== Index of Economic Freedom – Heritage Foundation and Wall Street Journal ===
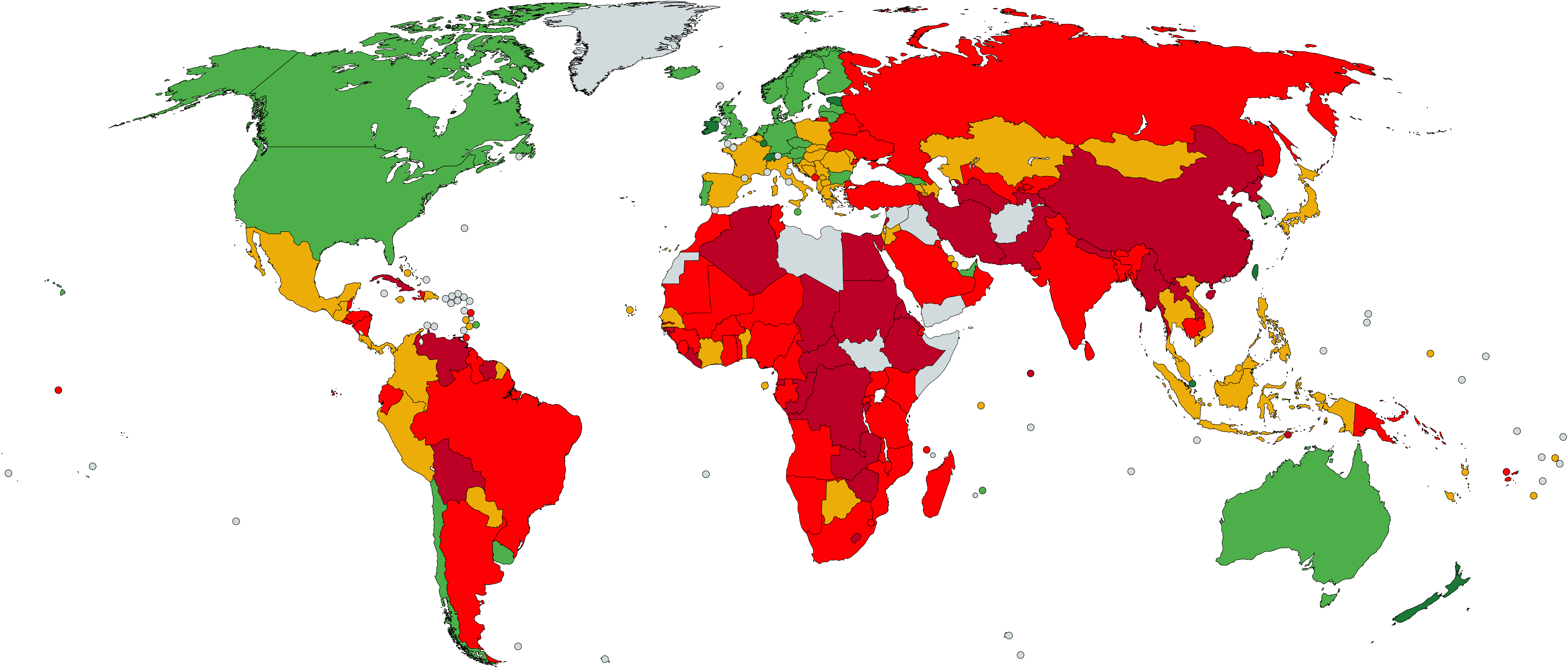
The 2022 Index of Economic Freedom, published by the Heritage Foundation and The Wall Street Journal

The Index of Economic Freedom is a series of 12 economic measurements created by the Heritage Foundation and The Wall Street Journal. According to the Heritage Foundation, the index's definition is: "Economic freedom is the fundamental right of every human to control his or her own labor and property. In an economically free society, individuals are free to work, produce, consume, and invest in any way they please, with that freedom both protected by the state and unconstrained by the state. In economically free societies, governments allow labor, capital and goods to move freely, and refrain from coercion or constraint of liberty beyond the extent necessary to protect and maintain liberty itself."

The index scores nations on 12 broad factors of economic freedom using statistics from organizations like the World Bank, the International Monetary Fund and the Economist Intelligence Unit:

- Business freedom
- Trade freedom
- Monetary freedom
- Government size
- Fiscal freedom
- Property rights
- Investment freedom
- Financial freedom
- Freedom from corruption
- Labor freedom

The 12 factors are averaged equally into a total score.

=== Economic Freedom of the World – Fraser Institute ===
The annual Economic Freedom of the World is an indicator of economic freedom produced by James Gwartney and Robert Lawson, and is published by the Canadian Fraser Institute. This index uses a definition of economic freedom similar to laissez-faire capitalism and it has been more widely used than any measure of economic freedom. Its use stems in part from the longer time period covered (data exists from 1980–2008), and the fact that this index is constructed from third party information (in contrast to the index created by the Heritage Foundation). According to this index, the cornerstones of economic freedom are personal choice, voluntary exchange, freedom to compete, and security of privately owned property.

In practice, the index measures:

- Size of government: expenditures, taxes, and enterprises
- Legal structure and security of property rights
- Access to sound money
- Freedom to trade internationally
- Regulation of credit, labor, and business

The report uses 42 distinct variables collected from a number of different sources (including the World Bank, the International Monetary Fund, and others). Some examples: tax rates, degree of juridical independence, inflation rates, costs of importing, and regulated prices. Each of the 5 areas above is given equal weight in the final score. Scores are available (largely dependent on data available) for 141 countries.

=== World Survey of Economic Freedom – Freedom House ===
Freedom House published a measure of economic freedom in 1996, but publication of this measure has been discontinued. They defined economic freedom through two dimensions – lack of state infringements on citizens' rights to exchange goods and services, and state establishment of the rules governing contracts, property rights and other institutional prerequisites required for the conduct of economic affairs. To determine level of economic freedom Freedom House used six indicators:

- freedom to hold property
- freedom to earn a living
- freedom to operate a business
- freedom to invest one's earnings
- freedom to trade internationally
- freedom to participate in the market economy

== Meta analysis ==
In a review of the literature, Lawson and Hall documented that "[o]ver two-thirds of these studies found economic freedom to correspond to a 'good' outcome such as faster growth, better living standards, more happiness, etc. Less than 4% of the sample found economic freedom to be associated with a 'bad' outcome such as increased income inequality." Furthermore, supporters contend that the size of government has shown correlations with negative growth.

== See also ==
- List of freedom indices
- List of sovereign states by economic freedom
