= Ease of doing business index =

Economic indicator

The ease of doing business index was an index created jointly by Simeon Djankov, Michael Klein, and Caralee McLiesh, three leading economists at the World Bank Group, following the release of World Development Report 2002. The academic research for the report was done jointly with professors Edward Glaeser, Oliver Hart, and Andrei Shleifer. Though the first report was authored by Djankov, Klein, and McLiesh, and they continue to be listed as "founders" of the report, some sources attribute the genesis of the idea to Djankov and Gerhard Pohl (Dr. Pohl was the longtime director of private sector development within the Europe and Central Asia unit). Higher rankings (a low numerical value) indicated better, usually simpler, regulations for businesses and stronger protections of property rights. Empirical research funded by the World Bank to justify their work show that the economic growth effect of improving these regulations is strong. Other researchers find that the distance-to-frontier measure introduced in 2016 after a decision of the World Bank board is not correlated with subsequent economic growth or investment.

"World Development Report 2002", the basis of the research behind Doing Business, analyzes how to build effective institutions. In understanding what drives institutional change, the report emphasizes the importance of history, highlighting the need to ensure effective institutions through a design that complements existing institutions, human capabilities, and available technologies. The study was guided by Joseph Stiglitz and Roumeen Islam with principal authors Simeon Dyankov and Aart Kraay. Several background papers, including by Nobel Prize winners Robert Shiller, Amartya Sen and Gabriel García Márquez, were published in academic journals or books.

The report was discontinued by the World Bank on September 14, 2021 following an audit documenting how bank leadership pressured experts to manipulate the results of the 2018 and 2020 reports. Several organizations have proposed replacements, including the Antigua Forum, the World Bank, and the Fraser Institute. In 2023 the Templeton Foundation extended a grant to Professor Robert Lawson at Southern Methodist University to propose a methodology for restarting the project in academia.

The World Bank released the methodology for the replacement of the index in May 2023. For each of the twelve topic areas, the document provides the motivation, selected indicators, detailed questionnaires, benchmarking parameters, detailed scoring rules, and data collection sources. The World Bank conducted a series of methodology workshops worldwide. Their main purpose was to provide a detailed presentation on the project’s methodology, including overall scope and topic-specific information. The workshops also served to raise awareness about this new benchmarking initiative and disseminate its potential for reform advocacy, policy advice, and development research. The relaunch took place in October 2024 under the moniker "Business Ready," after two delays.

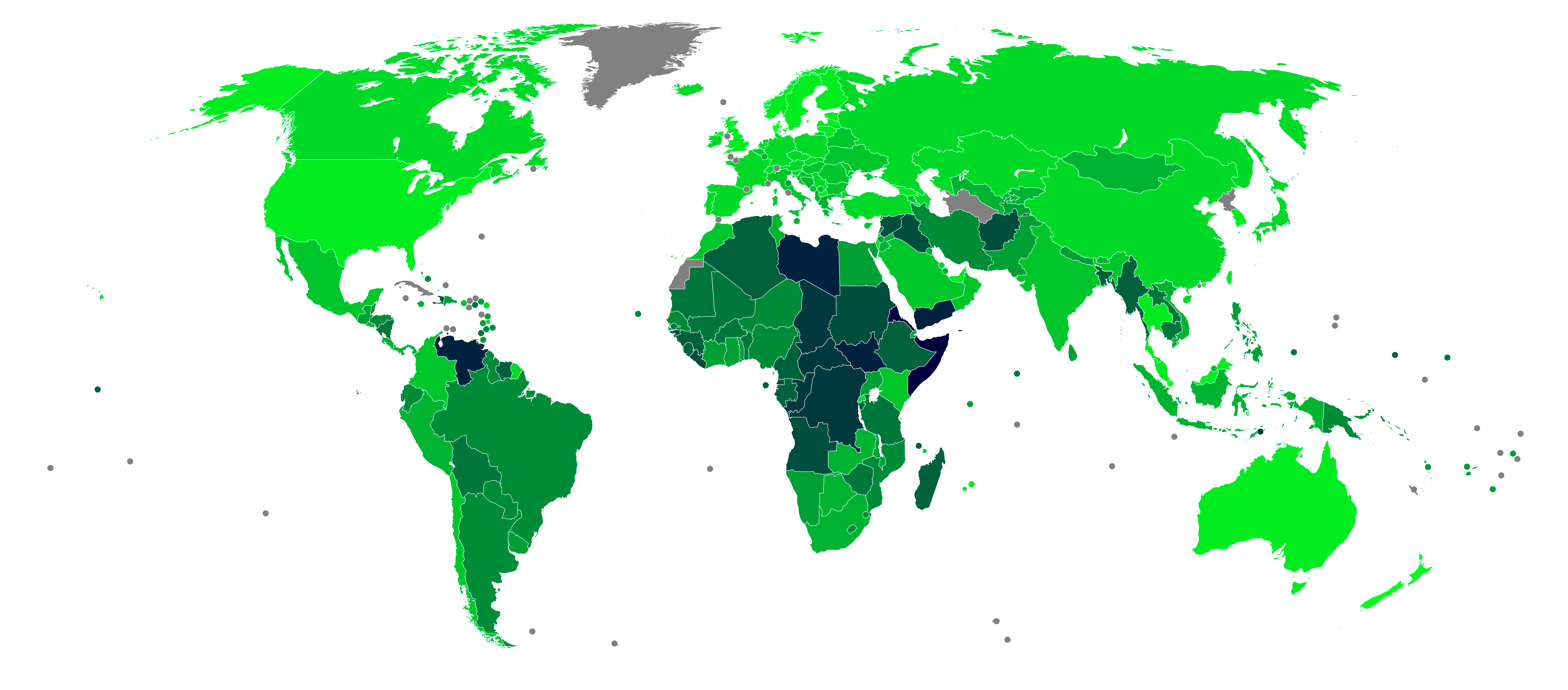
World Bank's Ease of Doing Business index map for 2020: ≥ 85.0 80.0–84.9 75.0–79.9 70.0–74.9 65.0–69.9 / 60.0–64.9 55.0–59.9 50.0–54.9 45.0–49.9 40.0–44.9 / 35.0–39.9 30.0–34.9 ≤ 25.0 Data unavailable

== Methodology ==
The report was a benchmark study of regulation. The survey consisted of a questionnaire designed by the Doing Business team with the assistance of academic advisers. The questionnaire centered on a simple business case that ensures comparability across economies and over time. The survey also based assumptions on the legal form of the business, size, location, and nature of its operations. The ease of doing business index was meant to measure regulations directly affecting businesses and did not directly measure more general conditions such as a nation's proximity to large markets, quality of infrastructure, inflation, or crime.

The next step was gathering data surveys of over 12,500 expert contributors (lawyers, accountants, etc.) in 190 countries who deal with business regulations in their day-to-day work. These individuals interacted with the Doing Business team in conference calls, written correspondence, and visits by the global team. For the 2017 report, team members visited 34 economies to verify data and to recruit respondents. Data from the survey was subjected to several rounds of verification. The surveys were not a statistical sample, and the results were interpreted and cross-checked for consistency before being included in the report. Results were also validated with the relevant government before publication. Respondents filled out written surveys and provided references to the relevant laws, regulations, and fees based on standardized case scenarios with specific assumptions, such as the business being located in the largest business city of the economy.

A nation's ranking on the index was based on an average of 10 subindices:

- Starting a business – Procedures, time, cost, and minimum capital to open a new business
- Dealing with construction permits – Procedures, time, and cost to build a warehouse
- Getting electricity – procedures, time, and cost required for a business to obtain a permanent electricity connection for a newly constructed warehouse
- Registering property – Procedures, time, and cost to register commercial real estate
- Getting credit – Strength of legal rights index, depth of credit information index
- Protecting investors – Indices on the extent of disclosure, the extent of director liability, and ease of shareholder suits
- Paying taxes – Number of taxes paid, hours per year spent preparing tax returns, and total tax payable as a share of gross profit
- Trading across borders – Number of documents, cost, and time necessary to export and import
- Enforcing contracts – Procedures, time, and cost to enforce a debt contract
- Resolving insolvency – The time, cost, and recovery rate (%) under a bankruptcy proceeding

The Doing Business project also offers information on the following datasets:

- Distance to the frontier – Shows the distance of each economy to the "frontier," which represents the highest performance observed on each of the indicators across all economies included since each indicator was included in Doing Business
- Good practices – Provide insights into how governments have improved the regulatory environment in the past in the areas measured by Doing Business

For example, according to the Doing Business (DB) 2013 report, Canada ranked third on the first subindex "Starting a business" behind only New Zealand and Australia. In Canada, there is 1 procedure required to start a business which takes on average 5 days to complete. The official cost is 0.4% of the gross national income per capita. There was no minimum capital requirement. By contrast, in Chad which ranked among the worst (181st out of 185) on this same subindex, there were 9 procedures required to start a business taking 62 days to complete. The official cost was 202% of the gross national income per capita. A minimum capital investment of 289.4% of the gross national income per capita is required.

While fewer and simpler regulations often imply higher rankings, this was not always the case. Protecting the rights of creditors and investors, as well as establishing or upgrading property and credit registries, may mean that more regulation is needed.

In most indicators, the case study referred to a small domestically owned manufacturing company—hence the direct relevance of the indicators to foreign investors and large companies is limited. DB uses a simple averaging approach for weighting sub-indicators and calculating rankings. A detailed explanation of every indicator can be found through the DB website and a .xls archive that simulates reforms.

Some caveats regarding the rankings and main information presented have to be considered by every user of the report. Mainly:

- Doing Business did not measure all aspects of the business environment that matter to firms or investors, such as the macroeconomic conditions, or the level of employment, corruption, stability, or poverty, in every country.
- Doing Business did not consider the strengths and weaknesses of neither the global financial system, nor the financial system of every country. It also doesn't consider the state of the finances of the government of every country.
- Doing Business does not cover all the regulations or all the regulatory requirements. Other types of regulation such as financial market, environment, or intellectual property regulations that are relevant for the private sector are not considered.

The Doing Business report was not intended as a complete assessment of competitiveness or the business environment of a country and should rather be considered as a proxy of the regulatory framework faced by the private sector in a country.

== History ==
The Doing Business report has its origins in a 2002 paper published in the Quarterly Journal of Economics by Simeon Djankov, Rafael La Porta, Florencio Lopez-de-Silanes and Andrei Shleifer under the title "The Regulation of Entry". The study presents data on the regulation of entry of start-up firms in 85 countries covering the number of procedures, official time and official cost that a start-up must bear before it can operate legally. The main findings of the paper are that: "Countries with heavier regulation of entry have higher corruption and larger unofficial economies, but no better quality of public or private goods. Countries with more democratic and limited governments have lighter regulation of entry." The paper became widely known, with over five thousand academic references, because it provides quantitative evidence that entry regulation benefits politicians and bureaucrats without adding value to the private sector or granting any additional protection.

Several countries have launched reforms to improve their rankings. These efforts are motivated to a great scope by the fact that the World Bank Group publishes the data, and hence coverage by the media and the private sector every year. Also, Doing Business highlights every year the successful reforms carried out by each country. The Regulation of Entry was published, Simeon Djankov and Andrei Shleifer have published nine other academic studies, one for each set of indicators covered by the report.

Over 18 years, 2003 to 2020, the reports recorded nearly 5,000 regulatory reforms implemented by 190 economies.

- Poland was the global top improver in the past year. It enhanced the ease of doing business through four institutional or regulatory reforms, making it easier to register property, pay taxes, enforce contracts, and resolve insolvency.
- Worldwide, 108 economies implemented 201 regulatory reforms in 2011/12 making it easier to do business as measured by Doing Business. Reform efforts globally have focused on making it easier to start a new business, increasing the efficiency of tax administration, and facilitating trade across international borders. Of the 201 regulatory reforms recorded in the past year, 44% focused on these 3 policy areas alone.
- Singapore topped the global ranking on the ease of doing business for the seventh consecutive year, followed by Hong Kong SAR; New Zealand; the United States; and Denmark. Georgia was a new entrant to the top 10.

In 2014 Doing Business covered regulations measured from June 2012 through May 2013 in 189 economies. Singapore was the first economy of the global ranking followed by Hong Kong SAR, New Zealand, the United States, Denmark, Malaysia, South Korea, Georgia, Norway, and the United Kingdom. The UK's Confederation of British Industry (CBI) published a recommendation aiming to move the UK from tenth position to fifth by 2020. For the first time data about Libya, Myanmar, San Marino, and South Sudan were collected for this report. 114 economies adopted 238 regulatory reforms during 2012/13: the reforms increased by 18% compared to the previous year.

In 2015, Doing Business covered regulations measured from June 2013 through June 2014 in 189 economies, including territories like Hong Kong. For the first time this year, Doing Business collected data for 2 cities in 11 economies with more than 100 million inhabitants. These economies include Bangladesh, Brazil, China, India, Indonesia, Japan, Mexico, Nigeria, Pakistan, the Russian Federation, and the United States. The added city enables a sub-national comparison and benchmarking against other large cities.

In 2021, the World Bank discontinued Doing Business, following allegations of data manipulation, undue influence, and unethical behavior by several staff including Djankov, including former World Bank vice-president Farid Belhaj, former World Bank research director Shanta Devarajan, former World Bank president Jim Yong Kim, and IMF managing director Kristalina Georgieva.

In October 2023, The Economist summarized the impact of the project, tracing its origins back to Austrian economist Friedrich Hayek. This Nobel-prize-winning economist and philosopher published the first volume of his magnum opus, “Law, Legislation and Liberty” in 1973, where he argued that the common-law approach is more amenable to freedom than its civil-law counterpart. Both Hayek and the Doing Business authors over-promised on the effects of regulatory reform. A 2024 paper by scholars at the University of Torino however finds significant positive effects on economic growth from reforms associated with Doing Business.

== Research and influence ==
As stated in the report, "Empirical research is needed to establish the optimal level of business regulation—for example, what the duration of court procedures should be and what the optimal degree of social protection is. The indicators compiled in the Doing Business project allow such research to take place. Since the start of the project in November 2001, more than 3,000 academic papers have used one or more indicators constructed in Doing Business and the related background papers by its authors." An example of such empirical research is a paper on business regulation and poverty, published in Economics Letters.

More than 3,000 academic papers used data from the index. The effect of improving regulations on economic growth is claimed to be very strong. Moving from the worst one-fourth of nations to the best one-fourth implies a 2.3 percentage point increase in annual growth. Another 7,000 working papers in economics and social science departments use the data from the Doing Business report. The 2016 Nobel Prize Winner in Economics Oliver Hart is among the authors of such papers.

The various sub-components of the index in themselves provided concrete suggestions for improvement. Many of them may have been relatively easy to implement and uncontroversial (except perhaps among corrupt officials who may gain from onerous regulations requiring bribes to bypass). As such, the index has influenced many nations to improve their regulations. Several have explicitly targeted to reach a minimum position on the index, for example, the top 25 list. To consider the element of corruption and transparency in the economy, the index has also been combined with the Corruption Perceptions Index in the annual Best European Countries for Business publication.

Somewhat similar annual reports are the Indices of Economic Freedom and the Global Competitiveness Report. They, especially the latter, look at many more factors that affect economic growth, like inflation and infrastructure. These factors may however be more subjective and diffuse, since many are measured using surveys and they may be more difficult to change quickly compared to regulations.

A November 2017 EconTalk podcast explains the lasting influence in academia and policy circles of the Doing Business report. Financial crises cyclically peak interest in research on insolvency, using the Doing Business data.

== Doing Business Report ==
The Doing Business Report (DB) was an annually published report which was developed by a team led by Djankov in 2003. It was published by the World Bank Group every year from 2003 to 2019 and aimed to measure the costs to firms of business regulations in 190 countries. The study was one of the flagship knowledge products of the World Bank Group in the field of private sector development and is claimed to have motivated the design of several regulatory reforms in developing countries. The study presented every year a detailed analysis of costs, requirements, and procedures a specific type of private firm is subject in all countries, and then, creates rankings for every country. The study is also backed up by broad communication efforts, and by creating rankings, the study spotlights countries and leaders that are promoting reforms.

The DB was widely known and used by academics, policy-makers, politicians, development experts, journalists, and the business community to highlight red tape and promote reforms. As stated by the IEG study from the World Bank:

"For country authorities, it sheds a bright, sometimes unflattering, light on regulatory aspects of their business climate. For business interests, it has helped to catalyze debates and dialogue about reform. For the World Bank Group, it demonstrates an ability to provide global knowledge, independent of resource transfer and conditionality. The annual exercise generates information that is relevant and useful".

According to the DB, the regulation does matter for the development of the private sectors, and several reforms are suggested across the report to promote the development of the private sector and enable the business environment. Some highlighted findings of the DB are:

- Lower barriers to start-up are associated with a smaller informal sector.
- Lower costs of entry encourage entrepreneurship, enhance firm productivity, and reduce corruption.
- Simple start-up translates into greater employment opportunities.

=== Contents ===
In 2017, the study contains quantitative measures of regulations for starting a business, dealing with construction permits, employing workers, registering property, getting credit, protecting shareholders, taxes, trading across borders, enforcing contracts, getting an electricity connection, and closing a business. As stated in the introduction of the study, "A fundamental premise of DB is that economic activity requires good rules. These include rules that establish and clarify property rights and reduce the costs of resolving disputes, rules that increase the predictability of economic interactions, and rules that provide contractual partners with core protections against abuse."

=== Evaluation ===
Doing Business was a controversial study, with passionate critics and devoted fans. As recognized by the Independent Evaluation Group of the World Bank, some have questioned the reliability and objectivity of its measurements while others doubt the relevance of the issues it addresses or fears it may unduly dominate countries reform agendas at the expense of more crucial development objectives. Attention given to the indicators may inadvertently signal that the World Bank Group values less burdensome business regulations more highly than its other strategies for poverty reduction and sustainable development.

Several limitations were present in the DB studies and have to be kept in mind when using the study:

- The indicators and measures were referred to the costs, requirements, and fees of doing business in the country's largest business city; thus conditions elsewhere within the country may have differed.
- To achieve cross-country standardization respondents were asked to give estimates for a limited liability company of a specific size. Costs for other forms and scales of businesses may have differed.
- Transactions and fees to have cost out were very specifically defined. The costs of other types of transactions may differ.
- The cost estimates come from individuals identified as expert respondents. Sometimes the estimates given by such individuals may differ with other experts and with public officials. If so, the responses are cross-checked for consistency.
- The estimates assumed that a business knows what is required and does not waste time. Satisfying regulatory requirements will take longer if the business lacks information or is unable to follow up promptly. A related point here is that DB does not allow for "workarounds", "facilitating fees", and "learning time" that speed or delay approvals and causes variation costs.

=== Related studies ===
Published for seventeen years, the DB has originated a growing body of research on how performance on DB indicators, and reforms generated by the reports, related to specific development desirable outcomes. As stated by the DB 2010, about "405 articles have been published in peer-reviewed academic journals, and about 1143 working papers are available through Google Scholar".

DB was widely used as a study to measure competitiveness. However, regulation rather than competitiveness is the main objective in the DB. Other studies that are also used to measure competitiveness and recognized as business enabling environment ranking systems are the Global Competitiveness Index, the Index of Economic Freedom, and the Global Entrepreneurship Monitor, among others.

== Controversies ==
=== 2018 manipulation scandal ===
On 12 January 2018, Paul Romer, the World Bank's chief economist, announced that past releases of the index would be corrected and recalculated going back at least four years. Romer apologized to Chile, saying that the former director of the group responsible for the index had repeatedly manipulated its methodology, unfairly penalizing the country's rankings during the administration of left-wing President Michelle Bachelet. In response, Bachelet announced that Chile would formally request a complete investigation by the World Bank. The report revealed that there were more extensive data irregularities, specifically in China's data. The Economist claimed that the project's director Augusto Lopez Claros had pressed staff to not show improvements in the indicators during Michelle Bachelet's term in office.

=== 2020 data irregularities controversy ===
Several major newspapers – including the Financial Times, The Economist, and The Wall Street Journal – report that the data of China, Azerbaijan, United Arab Emirates, and Saudi Arabia among others were suspected to be "inappropriately altered" in the 2020 Doing Business publication. In light of the data irregularities, the World Bank announced on 27 August 2020 that it would pause the Doing Business publication while it conducts a review of data changes for the last five reports and an internal audit of data integrity.

Following these revelations, some organizations paused the use of Doing Business data, and supplemented these reports with data from alternative indicators measuring the same concepts. On 16 December 2020, the World Bank released 3 reports about the conclusions of the reviews examining the data irregularities:

- A review of the specific irregularities identified.
- An independent confirmation of these irregularities.
- An independent review of Doing Business's processes for data production and management.

These reviews found that, while the specific issues uncovered in this breach had been addressed, a culture where management pressured experts to manipulate data persisted: "The DB team members reported undue pressure, both directly and indirectly by Bank management to manipulate data in 2017 during the 2018 report production process and in 2019 during the 2020 report production process. The lack of a safe speak-up environment within the DB team led to a fear of retaliation for those who would escalate and report pressures to manipulate data. This contributed to the compromise of data integrity in the DB report." These reports found that over half of Doing Business staff interviewed admitted to manipulating data.

Other analytical projects at the World Bank, the World Bank Enterprise Surveys, were also revealed to be "vulnerable to the ordering of questions."

"Our results indicate that of the 15 business environment obstacle ratings, only 4 show a statistically significant difference – political instability, corruption, electricity, and business licensing and permits. After using a regression analysis framework to account for several factors, only two business environment elements have a statistically significant difference across the two groups – business licensing and permits, and corruption."

=== Cancellation and Response ===
In September 2021, the World Bank discontinued the Doing Business report following the release of an independent report detailing the specifics of the 2020 and 2018 irregularities, including detailed explanations of how senior leaders at the bank manipulated data and pressured experts to change rankings and methodology to improve scores for certain countries.

The report from WilmerHale provided details on the 2018 and 2020 manipulation scandals, implicating the then-president of the Bank Jim Yong Kim, the then-CEO of the Bank Kristalina Georgieva, and one of the founders of the report Simeon Djankov, in data manipulation for the purposes of raising the scores of some countries (China and Saudi Arabia) and reducing the scores of others (Azerbaijan). In 2018 in an effort to secure funding from China, Kim, Georgieva, and Djankov repeatedly pressured the team that creates the data to pursue multiple avenues to improve China's score, eventually resorting to having members of the team unlock the report and change three of China's data points after the scores had been finalized. Georgieva issued a statement disagreeing with the characterization of her actions in the report.

According to the report, in 2020 Djankov pressured the Doing Business team to change Saudi Arabia's score in an effort to rank better than Jordan due to extensive Reimbursable Advisory Services contracts between the Bank and Saudi Arabia. The change in methodology also lead to the UAE improving in score but not overall ranking. Also in 2020, Djankov ordered a review of three of Azerbaijan's data points, citing harassment of lawyers as the reason. The team reviewed these data points and concluded that they were accurate. Djankov ignored these recommendations and changed Azerbaijan's score, also altering the overall methodology of the report to ensure that Azerbaijan scored lower, arguing that the government counterparts had pressured respondents.

Beyond these allegations, the report documents a culture of pressure from the highest levels of World Bank management, particularly under the leadership of Djankov. According to the report

"nearly every Doing Business employee with whom we spoke described the environment on the Doing Business team under the management of Mr. Djankov to be, at best, deeply problematic, and, at worse, emotionally harrowing. Employees said that Mr. Djankov was a "bully" who instilled fear on the team; that he managed “by terror and intimidation”; that his management style constituted “psychological terrorism” that created a “toxic environment”; that he was a “larger than life fear factor” for everyone on the team; and that his management style was pompous and undiplomatic."

The report also documents the culture of fear that prevented employees from reporting these irregularities, with Djankov threatening retaliation against anyone that threatened his authority, and "dangled promotions in front of Doing Business leadership to incentivize compliance with his personal objectives."

==== Response to the WilmerHale Report ====
Following these reports, various agencies expressed concern about the allegations and their effect on the world's faith in data produced by the World Bank. US Treasury Secretary Janet Yellen called for strong action to prevent misconduct and strengthen data integrity. Other US agencies called the report "serious and troubling" and replaced data from the Doing Business report with other sources.

When these allegations came to light, Georgieva was serving as the managing director of the International Monetary Fund. The IMF's board reviewed the allegations, but found that the report "did not conclusively demonstrate" that she engaged in data manipulation. The US government refused to publicly support Georgieva, but did not call for her removal.

==== Response to Report Cancellation ====
The cancellation of the report led to a range of responses from academics and think tanks, with some claiming that its cancellation was overdue, and others arguing it was an overreaction. According to the progressive Oakland Institute "Even before the extent of the data manipulation came to light and destroyed any credibility of the DBR, the rankings had been built on a flawed premise that rewards countries for reducing their labor standards, destroying the environment, and providing easy access for corporate pillaging and land grabs." The director of policy and research for the Cicero Institute, noted that institutions like the World Bank are especially prone to corruption like this:

"Multilateral institutions like the World Bank are particularly susceptible to such forces. Their structures ensure that each government gets a say, while no one government is held accountable. When Georgieva thanked a data manipulator for doing his “bit for multilateralism,” she was more right than she knew. Like many supposedly not-for-profit international organizations, the World Bank also found ways to peddle its influence. It began selling “Reimbursable Advisory Services” to countries that wanted to improve their ranking on the index."

Others criticized the cancellation of the report. Professor Robert Lawson, Fullinwider Chair in Economic Freedom at Southern Methodist University described this decision as "throwing the baby out with the bathwater." According to Ian Vasquez, director for policy at the Cato Institute, a US-based libertarian think tank:

"It was a serious mistake for the World Bank to discontinue the Doing Business report. It did so out of concerns about data irregularities for two years affecting four countries. Instead of instituting sensible, new measures on process and methodology as recommended by the firm that conducted an independent review for the World Bank, the bank chose to scrap the Doing Business report altogether. From the outside, it very much looks like the decade‐long campaign by critics of market‐oriented policies finally triumphed."

== Reception ==
The Doing Business methodology regarding labor regulations was criticized by the International Trade Union Confederation because it favored flexible employment regulations. In early reports, the easier it was to dismiss a worker for economic reasons in a country, the more its rankings improved. The Employing Workers index was revised in Doing Business 2008 to be in full compliance with the 188 International Labour Organization conventions. It has subsequently been removed from the rankings. The ITUC debuted the Global Rights Index in 2014 as a response to the Doing Business report.

In 2008 the World Bank Group's Independent Evaluation Group, a semi-independent watchdog within the World Bank Group, published an evaluation of the Doing Business index. The report, Doing Business: An Independent Evaluation, contained both praise and criticism of Doing Business. The report recommended that the index be clearer about what is and is not measured, disclose changes to published data, recruit more informants, and simplify the Paying Taxes indicator.

In April 2009 the World Bank issued a note with revisions to the Employing Workers index. The note explained that scoring for the "Employing Workers" indicator would be updated in Doing Business 2010 to give favorable scores for complying with relevant ILO conventions. The Employing Workers indicator was also removed as a guidepost for Country Policy and Institutional Assessments, which help determine resources provided to IDA countries.

A study commissioned by the Norwegian government alleges methodological weaknesses, an uncertainty in the ability of the indicators to capture the underlying business climate and a concern that countries may find it easier to change their ranking in Doing Business than to change the underlying business environment.

In 2013, an independent panel appointed by the President of the World Bank and headed by Trevor Manuel of South Africa issued a review expressing concern about the potential for the report and index to be misinterpreted, and the narrowness of the indicators and information base. It recommended that the report be retained, but that the aggregate rankings be removed and that a peer-review process is implemented (among other things). Regarding the topics of Paying Taxes and Employing Workers, it noted that "The latter has already been excluded from the report's rankings. While there is a persuasive case for paying attention to these aspects of doing business, the Bank will need to carefully consider the correct way to assess the regulation and legal environment of these areas if these indicators are to be retained."

In 2018, another independent evaluation, was commissioned by the World Bank Group. The evaluation praised the Doing Business report for its objectivity and focus on regulatory reform. It suggested adding peer-reviewed research papers behind every set of indicators. Subsequently, the World Bank has added one such research article, underlying the indicator on property registration.

== Ranking ==
The last published rankings came from the "Doing Business 2020" report. Ranking of economies was introduced in the "Doing Business 2006" report.

New Zealand topped the Ease of Doing Business rankings in 2017, 2018, 2019, and 2020. Singapore topped the Ease of Doing Business rankings in 2007–2016.

One interesting fact is that although richer countries on average are ranked higher than poor countries, there are some remarkable exceptions, particularly oil-rich countries. For example, Kuwait (ranked 83), Qatar (ranked 77), Oman (ranked 68) Saudi Arabia (ranked 62). Compare to lower-income countries: India (ranked 63), Kenya (ranked 56), Colombia (ranked 67), Uzbekistan (ranked 69). Notable exceptions are Norway (ranked 9) and the United Arab Emirates (ranked 16).

China's 2018 ranking, and 2020 rankings of the UAE and Saudi Arabia are alleged to have been artificially strengthened by an internal audit of the rankings. In contrast, Azerbaijan's 2019 ranking is alleged to have been artificially lowered.

Jurisdiction	Classification	2020	2019	2018	2017	2016	2015	2014	2013	2012	2011	2010	2009	2008	2007	2006
New Zealand	Very Easy	1	1	1	1	2	2	3	3	3	3	2	2	2	2	1
Singapore	Very Easy	2	2	2	2	1	1	1	1	1	1	1	1	1	1	2
Hong Kong	Very Easy	3	4	5	4	5	3	2	2	2	2	3	4	4	5	7
Denmark	Very Easy	4	3	3	3	3	4	5	5	5	6	6	5	5	7	8
South Korea	Very Easy	5	5	5	4	5	4	5	7	8	8	16	19	23	30	23
United States	Very Easy	6	8	6	8	7	7	4	4	4	5	4	3	3	3	3
Georgia	Very Easy	7	6	9	16	24	15	8	9	16	12	11	15	18	37	100
United Kingdom	Very Easy	8	9	7	7	6	8	10	7	7	4	5	6	6	6	9
Norway	Very Easy	9	7	8	6	9	6	9	6	6	8	10	10	11	9	5
Sweden	Very Easy	10	12	10	9	8	11	14	13	14	14	18	17	14	13	14
Lithuania	Very Easy	11	14	16	21	20	24	17	27	27	23	26	28	26	16	15
Malaysia	Very Easy	12	15	24	23	18	18	6	12	18	21	23	20	24	25	21
Mauritius	Very Easy	13	20	25	49	32	28	20	19	23	20	17	24	27	32	23
Australia	Very Easy	14	18	14	15	13	10	11	10	15	10	9	9	9	8	6
Taiwan	Very Easy	15	13	15	11	11	19	16	16	25	33	46	61	50	47	35
United Arab Emirates	Very Easy	16	11	21	26	31	22	23	26	33	40	33	46	68	77	69
North Macedonia	Very Easy	17	10	11	10	12	30	25	23	22	38	32	71	75	92	81
Estonia	Very Easy	18	16	12	12	16	17	22	21	24	17	24	22	17	17	16
Latvia	Very Easy	19	19	19	14	22	23	24	25	21	24	27	29	22	24	26
Finland	Very Easy	20	17	13	13	10	9	12	11	11	13	16	14	13	14	13
Thailand	Very Easy	21	27	26	46	49	26	18	18	17	19	12	13	15	18	20
Germany	Very Easy	22	24	20	17	15	14	21	20	19	22	25	25	20	21	19
Canada	Very Easy	23	22	18	22	14	16	19	17	13	7	8	8	7	4	4
Ireland	Very Easy	24	23	17	18	17	13	15	15	10	9	7	7	8	10	11
Kazakhstan	Very Easy	25	28	36	35	41	77	50	49	47	59	63	70	71	63	86
Iceland	Very Easy	26	21	23	20	19	12	13	14	9	15	14	11	10	12	12
Austria	Very Easy	27	26	22	19	21	21	30	29	32	32	28	27	25	30	32
Russia	Very Easy	28	31	35	40	51	62	92	112	120	123	120	120	106	96	79
Japan	Very Easy	29	39	34	34	34	29	27	24	20	18	15	12	12	11	10
Spain	Very Easy	30	30	28	32	33	33	52	44	44	49	62	49	38	39	30
China	Very Easy	31	46	78	78	84^{*}	90	96	91	91	79	89	83	83	93	91
France	Very Easy	32	32	31	29	27	31	38	34	29	26	31	31	31	35	44
Turkey	Very Easy	33	43	60	69	55	55	69	71	71	65	73	59	57	91	93
Azerbaijan	Very Easy	34	25	57	65	63	80	70	67	66	54	38	33	96	99	98
Israel	Very Easy	35	49	54	52	53	40	35	38	34	29	29	30	29	26	29
Switzerland	Very Easy	36	38	33	31	26	20	29	28	26	27	21	21	16	15	17
Slovenia	Very Easy	37	40	37	30	29^{*}	51	33	35	37	42	53	54	55	61	63
Rwanda	Very Easy	38	29	41	56	62	46	32	52	45	58	67	139	150	158	139
Portugal	Very Easy	39	34	29	25	23	25	31	30	30	31	48	48	37	40	42
Poland	Very Easy	40	33	27	24	25	32	45	55	62	70	72	76	74	75	54
Czech Republic	Very Easy	41	35	30	27	36	44	75	65	64	63	74	75	56	52	41
Netherlands	Very Easy	42	36	32	28	28	27	28	31	31	30	30	26	21	22	24
Bahrain	Very Easy	43	62	66	63	65	53	46	42	38	28	20	18	—N/a	—N/a	—N/a
Serbia	Very Easy	44	48	43	48	59	91	93	86	92	89	88	94	86	68	92^{**}
Slovakia	Very Easy	45	42	39	33	29^{*}	37	49	46	48	41	42	36	32	36	37
Belgium	Very Easy	46	45	52	42	43	42	36	33	28	25	22	19	19	20	18
Armenia	Very Easy	47	41	47	38	35	45	37	32	55	48	43	44	39	34	46
Moldova	Very Easy	48	47	44	44	52	63	78	83	81	90	94	103	92	103	83
Belarus	Very Easy	49	37	38	37	44	57	63	58	69	68	58	85	110	129	106
Montenegro	Very Easy	50	50	42	51	46	36	44	51	56	66	71	90	81	70	92^{**}
Croatia	Very Easy	51	58	51	43	40	65	89	84	80	84	103	106	97	124	118
Hungary	Very Easy	52	53	48	41	42	54	54	54	51	46	47	41	45	66	52
Morocco	Very Easy	53	60	69	68	75	71	87	97	94	114	128	128	129	115	102
Cyprus	Easy	54	57	53	45	47	64	39	36	40	37	40	—N/a	—N/a	—N/a	—N/a
Romania	Easy	55	52	45	36	37	48	73	72	72	56	55	47	48	49	78
Kenya	Easy	56	61	80	92	108	136	129	121	109	98	95	82	72	83	68
Kosovo	Easy	57	44	40	60	66	75	86	98	117	119	113	—N/a	—N/a	—N/a	—N/a
Italy	Easy	58	51	46	50	45	56	65	73	87	80	78	65	53	82	70
Chile	Easy	59	56	55	57	48	41	34	37	39	43	49	40	33	28	25
Mexico	Easy	60	54	49	47	38^{*}	39	53	48	53	35	51	56	44	43	73
Bulgaria	Easy	61	59	50	39	38^{*}	38	58	66	59	51	44	45	46	54	62
Saudi Arabia	Easy	62	92	92	94	82	49	26	22	12	11	13	16	23	38	38
India	Easy	63	77	100	130	130	142	134	132	132	134	133	122	120	134	116
Ukraine	Easy	64	71	76	80	83	96	112	137	152	145	142	145	139	128	124
Puerto Rico	Easy	65	64	64	55	57	47	40	41	43	47	35	35	28	19	22
Brunei	Easy	66	55	56	72	84^{*}	101	59	79	83	112	96	88	78	—N/a	—N/a
Colombia	Easy	67	65	59	53	54	34	43	45	42	39	37	53	66	79	66
Oman	Easy	68	78	71	66	70	66	47	47	49	57	65	57	49	55	51
Uzbekistan	Easy	69	76	74	87	87	141	146	154	166	150	150	138	138	147	138
Vietnam	Easy	70	69	68	82	90	78	99	99	98	78	93	92	91	104	99
Jamaica	Easy	71	75	70	67	64	58	94	90	88	81	75	63	63	50	43
Luxembourg	Easy	72	66	63	59	61	59	60	56	50	45	64	50	42	—N/a	—N/a
Indonesia	Easy	73	73	72	91	109	114	120	128	129	121	122	129	123	135	115
Costa Rica	Easy	74	67	61	62	58	83	102	110	121	125	121	117	115	105	89
Jordan	Easy	75	104	103	118	113	117	119	106	96	111	100	101	80	78	74
Peru	Easy	76	68	58	54	50	35	42	43	41	36	56	62	58	65	71
Qatar	Easy	77	83	83	83	68	50	48	40	36	50	39	37	—N/a	—N/a	—N/a
Tunisia	Easy	78	80	88	77	74	60	51	50	46	55	69	73	88	80	58
Greece	Easy	79	72	67	61	60	61	72	78	100	109	109	96	100	109	80
Kyrgyzstan	Easy	80	70	77	75	67	102	68	70	70	44	41	68	94	90	84
Mongolia	Easy	81	74	62	64	56	72	76	76	86	73	60	58	52	45	61
Albania	Easy	82	63	65	58	97^{*}	68	90	85	82	82	82	86	136	120	117
Kuwait	Easy	83	97	96	102	101^{*}	86	104	82	67	74	61	52	40	46	47
South Africa	Easy	84	82	82	74	73	43	41	39	35	34	34	32	35	29	28
Zambia	Easy	85	87	85	98	97^{*}	111	83	94	84	76	90	100	116	102	67
Panama	Easy	86	79	79	70	69	52	55	61	61	72	77	81	65	81	57
Botswana	Easy	87	86	81	71	72	74	56	59	54	52	45	38	51	48	40
Malta	Easy	88	84	84	76	80	94	103	102	—N/a	—N/a	—N/a	—N/a	—N/a	—N/a	—N/a
Bhutan	Easy	89	81	75	73	71	125	141	148	142	142	126	124	119	138	104
Bosnia and Herzegovina	Easy	90	89	86	81	79	107	131	126	125	110	116	119	105	95	87
El Salvador	Easy	91	85	73	95	86	109	118	113	112	86	84	72	69	71	76
San Marino	Easy	92	88	93	79	76	93	81	—N/a	—N/a	—N/a	—N/a	—N/a	—N/a	—N/a	—N/a
Saint Lucia	Easy	93	93	91	86	77	100	64	53	52	53	36	34	34	27	—N/a
Nepal	Easy	94	110	105	107	99	108	105	108	107	116	123	121	111	100	55
Philippines	Easy	95	124	113	99	103	95	108	138	136	148	144	140	133	126	113
Guatemala	Easy	96	98	97	88	81	73	79	93	97	101	110	112	114	118	109
Togo	Easy	97	137	156	154	150	149	157	156	162	160	165	163	156	151	149
Samoa	Medium	98	90	87	89	96	67	61	57	60	61	57	64	61	41	39
Sri Lanka	Medium	99	100	111	110	107	99	85	81	89	102	105	102	101	89	75
Seychelles	Medium	100	96	95	93	95	85	80	74	103	95	111	104	90	84	—N/a
Uruguay	Medium	101	95	94	90	92	82	88	89	90	124	114	109	98	64	85
Fiji	Medium	102	101	101	97	88^{*}	81	62	60	77	62	54	39	36	31	34
Tonga	Medium	103	91	89	85	78	69	57	62	58	71	52	43	47	51	36
Namibia	Medium	104	107	106	109	101^{*}	88	98	87	78	69	66	51	43	42	33
Trinidad and Tobago	Medium	105	105	102	96	88^{*}	79	66	69	68	97	81	80	67	59	—N/a
Tajikistan	Medium	106	126	123	128	132	166	143	141	147	139	152	159	153	133	—N/a
Vanuatu	Medium	107	94	90	84	94	76	74	80	76	60	59	60	62	58	49
Pakistan	Medium	108	136	147	144	138	128^{*}	110	107	105	83	85	77	76	74	60
Malawi	Medium	109	111	110	133	141	164	171	157	145	133	132	134	127	110	96
Côte d'Ivoire	Medium	110	122	139	142	142	147	167	177	167	169	168	161	155	141	145
Dominica	Medium	111	103	98	101	91	97^{*}	77	68	65	88	83	74	77	72	—N/a
Djibouti	Medium	112	99	154	171	171	155	160	171	170	158	163	153	146	161	—N/a
Antigua and Barbuda	Medium	113	112	107	113	104	89	71	63	57	64	50	42	41	33	—N/a
Egypt	Medium	114	120	128	122	131	112	128	109	110	94	106	114	126	165	141
Dominican Republic	Medium	115	102	99	103	93	84	117	116	108	91	86	97	99	117	103
Uganda	Medium	116	127	122	115	122	150	132	120	123	122	112	111	118	107	72
Palestine	Medium	117	116	114	140	129	143	138	135	131	135	139	131	117	127	125
Ghana	Medium	118	114	120	108	114^{*}	70	67	64	63	67	92	87	87	94	82
Bahamas	Medium	119	118	119	121	106	97^{*}	84	77	85	77	68	55	—N/a	—N/a	—N/a
Papua New Guinea	Medium	120	108	109	119	145	133	113	104	101	103	102	95	84	57	64
Eswatini	Medium	121	117	112	111	105	110	123	123	124	118	115	108	95	76	—N/a
Lesotho	Medium	122	106	104	100	114^{*}	128^{*}	136	136	143	138	130	123	124	114	97
Senegal	Medium	123	141	140	147	153	161	178	166	154	152	157	149	162	146	132
Brazil	Medium	124	109	125	123	116	120	116	130	126	127	129	125	122	121	119
Paraguay	Medium	125	113	108	106	100	92	109	103	102	106	124	115	103	112	88
Argentina	Medium	126	119	117	116	121	124	126	124	113	115	118	113	109	101	77
Iran	Medium	127	128	124	120	118	130	152	145	144	129	137	142	135	119	108
Barbados	Medium	128	129	132	117	119	106	91	88	—N/a	—N/a	—N/a	—N/a	—N/a	—N/a	—N/a
Ecuador	Medium	129	123	118	114	117	115	135	139	130	130	138	136	128	123	107
Saint Vincent and the Grenadines	Medium	130	130	129	125	111	103	82	75	75	75	70	66	54	85	—N/a
Nigeria	Medium	131	146	145	169	169	170	147	131	133	137	125	118	108	108	94
Niger	Medium	132	143	144	150	160	168	176	176	173	173	174	172	169	160	150
Honduras	Medium	133	121	115	105	110	104^{*}	127	125	128	131	141	133	121	111	112
Guyana	Medium	134	134	126	124	137	123	115	114	114	100	101	105	104	136	105
Belize	Medium	135	125	121	112	120	118	106	105	93	99	80	78	59	56	—N/a
Solomon Islands	Medium	136	115	116	104	112	87	97	92	74	96	104	89	79	69	53
Cape Verde	Medium	137	131	127	129	126	122	121	122	119	132	146	143	132	125	—N/a
Mozambique	Medium	138	135	138	137	133	127	139	146	139	126	135	141	134	140	110
Saint Kitts and Nevis	Medium	139	140	134	134	124	121	101	96	95	87	76	67	64	44	—N/a
Zimbabwe	Medium	140	155	159	161	155	171	170	173	171	157	159	158	152	153	126
Tanzania	Medium	141	144	137	132	139	131	145	134	127	128	131	127	130	142	140
Nicaragua	Medium	142	132	131	127	125	119	124	119	118	117	117	107	93	67	59
Lebanon	Medium	143	142	133	126	123	104^{*}	111	115	104	113	108	99	85	86	95
Cambodia	Medium	144	138	135	131	127	135	137	133	138	147	145	135	145	143	133
Palau	Medium	146	133	130	136	136	113	100	111	116	120	97	91	82	62	—N/a
Grenada	Medium	147	147	142	138	135	126	107	100	73	92	91	84	70	73	—N/a
Maldives	Medium	148	139	136	135	128	116	95	95	79	85	87	69	60	53	31
Mali	Below Average	149	145	143	141	143^{*}	146	155	151	146	153	156	166	158	155	146
Benin	Below Average	150	153	151	155	158	151	174	175	175	170	172	169	151	137	129
Bolivia	Below Average	151	156	152	149	157	157	162	155	153	149	161	150	140	131	111
Burkina Faso	Below Average	152	151	148	146	143^{*}	167	154	153	150	151	147	148	161	163	154
Mauritania	Below Average	153	148	150	160	168	176	173	167	159	165	166	160	157	148	127
Marshall Islands	Below Average	154	150	149	143	140	139	114	101	106	108	98	93	89	87	48
Laos	Below Average	155	154	141	139	134	148	159	163	165	171	167	165	164	159	147
Gambia	Below Average	156	149	146	145	151	138	150	147	149	146	140	130	131	113	—N/a
Guinea	Below Average	157	152	153	163	165	169	175	178	179	179	173	171	166	157	144
Algeria	Below Average	158	157	166	156	163	154	153	152	148	136	136	132	125	116	128
Micronesia	Below Average	159	160	155	151	148	145	156	150	140	141	127	126	112	106	56
Ethiopia	Below Average	160	159	161	159	146	132	125	127	111	104	107	116	102	97	101
Comoros	Below Average	160	164	158	153	154	159	158	158	157	159	162	155	146	144	—N/a
Madagascar	Below Average	161	161	162	167	164	163	148	142	137	140	134	144	149	149	131
Suriname	Below Average	162	165	165	158	156	162	161	164	158	161	155	146	142	122	—N/a
Sierra Leone	Below Average	163	163	160	148	147	140	142	140	141	143	148	156	160	168	136
Kiribati	Below Average	164	158	157	152	149	134	122	117	115	93	79	79	73	60	45
Myanmar	Below Average	165	172	171	170	167	177	182	—N/a	—N/a	—N/a	—N/a	—N/a	—N/a	—N/a	—N/a
Burundi	Below Average	166	168	164	157	152	152	140	159	169	181	176	177	174	166	143
Cameroon	Below Average	167	166	163	166	172	158	168	161	161	168	171	164	154	152	130
Bangladesh	Below Average	168	176	177	176	174	173	130	129	122	107	119	110	107	88	65
Gabon	Below Average	169	169	167	164	162	144	163	170	156	156	158	151	144	132	—N/a
São Tomé and Príncipe	Below Average	170	170	169	162	166	153	169	160	163	178	180	176	163	169	123
Sudan	Below Average	171	162	170	168	159	160	149	143	135	154	154	147	143	154	151
Iraq	Below Average	172	171	168	165	161	156	151	165	164	166	153	152	141	145	114
Afghanistan	Below Average	173	167	183	183	177	183	164	168	160	167	160	162	159	162	122
Guinea-Bissau	Below Average	174	175	176	172	178	179	180	179	176	176	181	179	176	173	—N/a
Liberia	Below Average	175	174	172	174	179	174	144	149	151	155	149	157	170	—N/a	—N/a
Syria	Below Average	176	179	174	173	175	175	165	144	134	144	143	137	137	130	121
Angola	Below Average	177	173	175	182	181	181	179	172	172	163	169	168	167	156	135
Equatorial Guinea	Below Average	178	177	173	178	180	165	166	162	155	164	170	165	165	150	—N/a
Haiti	Below Average	179	182	181	181	182	180	177	174	174	162	151	154	148	139	134
Congo	Below Average	180	180	179	177	176	178	185	183	181	177	179	178	175	171	148
Timor Leste	Below Average	181	178	178	175	173	172	172	169	168	174	164	170	168	174	142
Chad	Below Average	182	181	180	180	183	185	189	184	183	183	178	175	173	172	152
Democratic Republic of Congo	Below Average	183	184	182	184	184	184	183	181	178	175	182	181	178	175	155
Central African Republic	Below Average	184	183	184	185	185	187	188	185	182	182	183	180	177	167	153
South Sudan	Below Average	185	185	187	186	187	186	186	—N/a	—N/a	—N/a	—N/a	—N/a	—N/a	—N/a	—N/a
Libya	Below Average	186	186	185	188	188	188	187	—N/a	—N/a	—N/a	—N/a	—N/a	—N/a	—N/a	—N/a
Yemen	Below Average	187	187	186	179	170	137	133	118	99	105	99	98	113	98	90
Venezuela	Below Average	188	188	188	187	186	182	181	180	177	172	177	174	172	164	120
Eritrea	Below Average	189	189	189	189	189	189	184	182	180	180	175	173	171	170	137
Somalia	Below Average	190	190	190	190	—N/a	—N/a	—N/a	—N/a	—N/a	—N/a	—N/a	—N/a	—N/a	—N/a	—N/a

_{*} – same rank is for multiple jurisdictions
_{**} – the State Union of Serbia and Montenegro

Note: Rankings at the time of annual report publication. Rankings are subject to revision.

== See also ==
- Index of Economic Freedom
- List of countries by economic freedom
- Corruption Perceptions Index
- List of freedom indices
- Simeon Dyankov
