= China Education Resources =

China Education Resources Inc. (TSX-V: CHN), based in Beijing, China and Vancouver, Canada, along with its subsidiaries, is a company that provides an education Internet portal with educational content, resources and training programs to teachers, education professionals and students in the People's Republic of China. In general, the company's focus is on textbook sales, technology development and Internet portal subscriptions. China Education Resources is the only public company officially approved by China education officials to provide these comprehensive learning and training services.

== Services ==
China Education Resources offers kindergarten through grade 12 education resources and services through its Internet platform portal -- cersp.com. The Internet portal offers over 20,000 different courses and tutorials ranging from math, science, language arts to physical education, politics, economics, engineering and many other subjects. Currently, China Education Resources has agreements with school systems in eleven provinces in China. Formerly known as China Ventures, Inc., the company was founded in 1997 and is listed on the Toronto Venture Stock Exchange - TSXV:CHN, Pink Sheets:CHNUF. Longtime education and technology executive Chengfeng Zhou is CEO of China Education Resources.

In October 2010, China Education Resources announced that it had finalized agreements to provide new online education and training to teachers and education professionals in the city of Chongqing, China's largest city, and in the provinces of Heilongjiang, Sichuan and Yunnan. Then in November 2010, the company expanded even more throughout China to provide online training and education courses for teachers in China's largest province of Henan as well as in the provinces of Guangxi, Shaanxi and Xinjiang.

Presently, China Education Resources operates the world's largest blogger forum for teachers and education professionals with over 1.5 million members in China, Asia and locations throughout the globe.

== Collaboration ==
During the first quarter of 2010, China Education Resources initiated a joint promotional campaign in China with the Coca-Cola Company promoting Qoo, a non-carbonated beverage targeting the youth market. Coca-Cola Company successfully distributed over 100,000 promotional packages in the Beijing area each consisting of a large bottle of Qoo and a CD from China Education Resources which contained ten English courses and a link to China Education Resources education portal which gave the user access to online tutorial courses and a memory game to help students learn English.

Overall, China Education Resources is helping to transform the curriculum of the world's largest educational system. Recognizing the need for increased accessibility to address education reform policy changes, China Education Resource has created educational tools and curricula for China's entire kindergarten through twelfth grade system. By implementing goals of converting the existing educational system from memory-based learning to creative thinking and utilizing a more interactive approach to embrace a world-based economy, the company is playing an important role in positioning China's educational system reform.
