= Michael Walker (economist) =

Canadian economist

Michael Angus Walker (born 1945, in Corner Brook, Newfoundland) is a Canadian economist. He is best known as the founder of the Fraser Institute. He is a journalist, broadcaster and consultant.

== Biography ==
Walker earned a BA from St. Francis Xavier University, and went on to earn a Ph.D. from the University of Western Ontario. He worked at the Bank of Canada and the Department of Finance Canada. He then taught at the University of Western Ontario and Carleton University. Under his leadership, a series of conferences were started in the mid-1980s to measure economic freedom and rank countries accordingly.

A prominent spokesman in the media for free market causes, he founded the Fraser Institute in 1974. He was its executive director until 2005, and remains a Senior Fellow. He considers himself a libertarian.

In 2010 he received an honorary doctorate degree from Universidad Francisco Marroquín.
