= List of sovereign states by economic freedom =

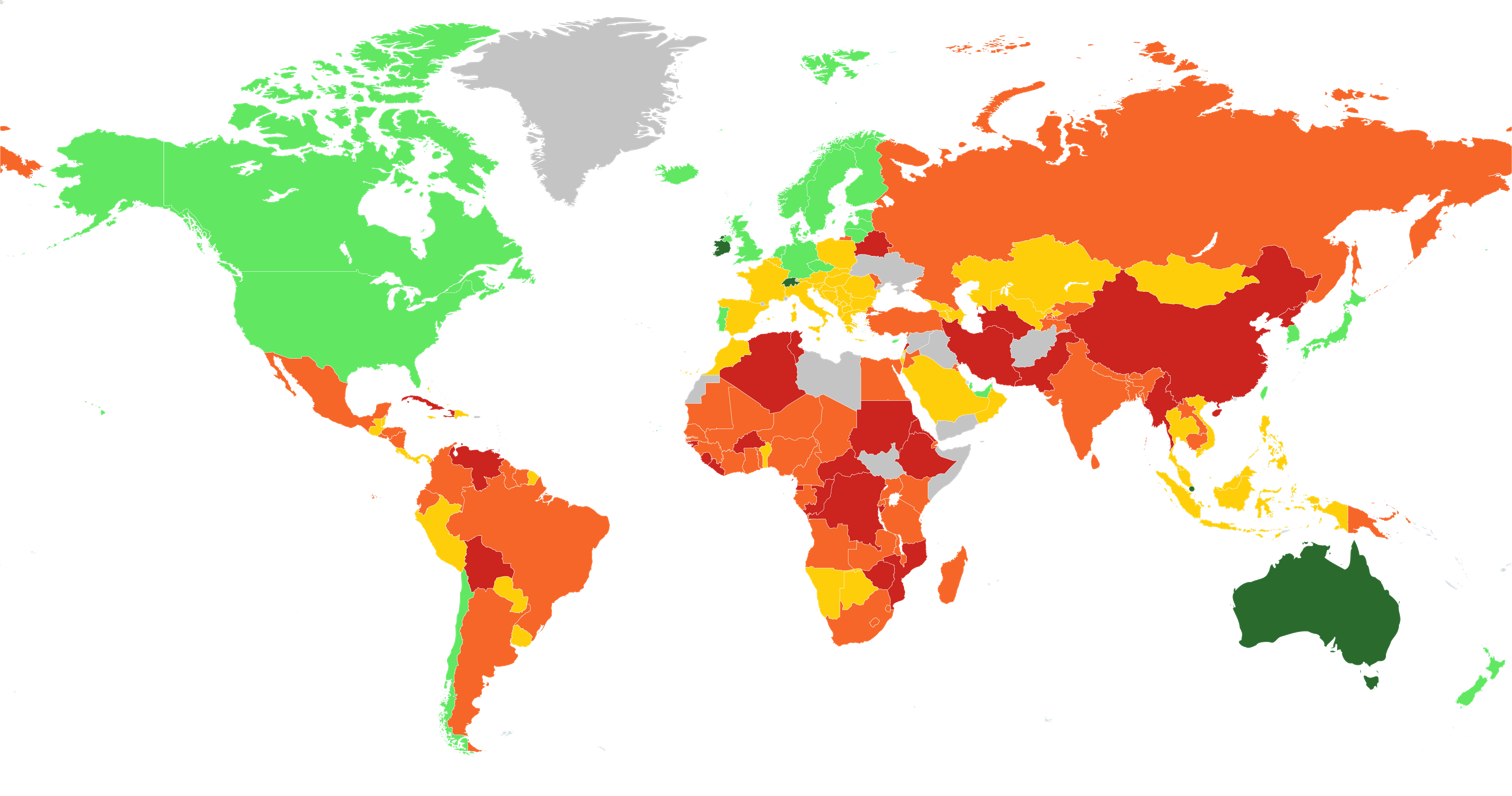
The 2026 Index of Economic Freedom, published by The Heritage Foundation and The Wall Street Journal

This is a list of countries by economic freedom that shows the countries and regions from two reports on economic freedom.

- The Economic Freedom of the World Index is a report published by the Fraser Institute in conjunction with the Economic Freedom Network, a Canadian group of independent research and educational institutes in 90 nations and territories worldwide.
- The Index of Economic Freedom is an annual report published by The Heritage Foundation and The Wall Street Journal in the United States. Countries and regions are assessed as free, mostly free, moderately free, mostly unfree, or repressed.

== List ==
Key: ██ Free (80–100) ██ Mostly Free (70–79.9) ██ Moderately Free (60–69.9) ██ Mostly Unfree (50–59.9) ██ Repressed (0–49.9)

2019 Economic Freedom of the World Index
Country	Score	Change
Hong Kong	90.2	0.0
Singapore	89.4	▲0.6
New Zealand	84.4	▲0.2
Switzerland	81.9	▲0.2
Australia	80.9	0.0
Ireland	80.5	▲0.1
United Kingdom	78.9	▲0.9
Canada	77.7	0.0
United Arab Emirates	77.1	0.0
Taiwan	77.3	▲0.7
Iceland	77.1	▲0.1
United States	76.8	▲1.1
Netherlands	76.8	▲0.6
Denmark	76.7	▲0.1
Estonia	76.6	▼2.2
Georgia	75.9	▼0.3
Luxembourg	75.9	▼0.5
Chile	75.4	▲0.2
Sweden	75.2	▼1.1
Finland	74.9	▲0.8
Lithuania	74.2	▼1.1
Malaysia	74.0	▼0.5
Czech Republic	73.7	▼0.5
Germany	73.5	▼0.7
Mauritius	73.0	▼2.1
Norway	73.0	▼1.3
Israel	72.8	▲0.6
Qatar	72.6	0.0
South Korea	72.3	▼1.5
Japan	72.1	▼0.2
Austria	72.0	▲0.2
Rwanda	71.1	▲2.0
North Macedonia	71.1	▼0.2
Macau	71.0	▲0.1
Latvia	70.4	▼3.2
Botswana	69.5	▼0.4
Bulgaria	69.0	▲0.7
Saint Lucia	68.7	▲1.1
Jamaica	68.6	▼0.5
Uruguay	68.6	▼0.6
Malta	68.6	▲0.1
Romania	68.6	▼0.8
Thailand	68.3	▲1.2
Cyprus	68.1	▲0.3
Peru	67.8	▼0.9
Poland	67.8	▼0.7
Armenia	67.7	▼1.0
Belgium	67.3	▼0.2
Colombia	67.3	▼1.6
Panama	67.2	▲0.2
Kosovo	67.0	▲0.4
Albania	66.5	▲2.0
Jordan	66.5	▲1.6
Bahrain	66.4	▼1.3
Saint Vincent and the Grenadines	65.8	▼1.9
Indonesia	65.8	▲1.6
Spain	65.7	▲0.6
Slovenia	65.5	▲0.7
Kazakhstan	65.4	▼3.7
Azerbaijan	65.4	▲1.1
Costa Rica	65.3	▼0.3
Portugal	65.3	▲1.9
Brunei Darussalam	65.1	▲0.9
Hungary	65.0	▼1.7
Slovakia	65.0	▼0.3
Mexico	64.7	▼0.1
Barbados	64.7	▲7.7
Turkey	64.6	▼0.8
Serbia	63.9	▲1.4
Philippines	63.8	▼1.2
France	63.8	▼0.1
Dominica	63.6	▼0.9
Cabo Verde	63.1	▲3.1
Bhutan	62.9	▲1.1
Morocco	62.9	▲1.0
The Bahamas	62.9	▼0.4
Guatemala	62.6	▼0.8
Côte d'Ivoire	62.4	▲0.4
Kyrgyz Republic	62.3	▼0.5
Italy	62.2	▼0.3
Fiji	62.2	▲0.2
Samoa	62.2	▲0.7
Bosnia and Herzegovina	61.9	▲0.5
El Salvador	61.8	▼1.4
Paraguay	61.8	▼0.3
Croatia	61.4	▲0.4
Seychelles	61.4	▼0.2
Oman	61.0	0.0
Dominican Republic	61.0	▼0.6
Kuwait	60.8	▼1.4
Saudi Arabia	60.7	▲1.1
Montenegro	60.5	▼3.8
Honduras	60.2	▼0.4
Tanzania	60.2	▲0.3
Uganda	59.7	▼2.3
Burkina Faso	59.4	▼0.6
Moldova	59.1	▲0.7
Russia	58.9	▲0.7
Namibia	58.7	▲0.2
China	58.4	▲0.6
Papua New Guinea	58.4	▲2.7
South Africa	58.3	▼4.7
Mali	58.1	▲0.5
Belarus	57.9	▼0.2
Cambodia	57.8	▼0.9
Greece	57.7	▲0.4
Nicaragua	57.7	▼1.2
Tonga	57.7	▼5.4
Ghana	57.5	▲1.5
Laos	57.4	▲3.8
Nigeria	57.3	▼1.2
Trinidad and Tobago	57.0	▼0.7
Guyana	56.8	▼1.9
Madagascar	56.6	▼0.2
Sri Lanka	56.4	▼1.4
Vanuatu	56.4	▼13.1
Senegal	56.3	▲0.6
Gabon	56.3	▼1.7
Mauritania	55.7	▲1.7
Guinea	55.7	▲3.5
Bangladesh	55.6	▲0.5
Tajikistan	55.6	▼2.7
Belize	55.4	▼1.7
Comoros	55.4	▼0.8
Tunisia	55.4	▼3.5
Mongolia	55.4	▼0.3
Benin	55.3	▼1.4
Vietnam	55.3	▲2.2
India	55.2	▲0.7
Kenya	55.1	▲0.4
Pakistan	55.0	▲0.6
Eswatini	54.7	▼1.2
Solomon Islands	54.6	▼2.9
São Tomé and Príncipe	54.0	▲0.4
Guinea-Bissau	54.0	▼2.9
Nepal	53.8	▼0.3
Ethiopia	53.6	▲0.8
Zambia	53.6	▼0.7
Myanmar	53.6	▼0.3
Uzbekistan	53.3	▲1.8
Maldives	53.2	▲2.1
Lesotho	53.1	▼0.8
Haiti	52.7	▼3.1
Egypt	52.5	▼0.9
Cameroon	52.4	▲0.5
The Gambia	52.4	▲0.1
Ukraine	52.3	▲0.4
Argentina	52.2	▼0.1
Micronesia	51.9	▼0.4
Brazil	51.9	▲0.5
Niger	51.6	▲2.1
Afghanistan	51.5	▲0.2
Malawi	51.4	▼0.6
Lebanon	51.1	▼2.1
Iran	51.1	▲0.2
Angola	50.6	▲2.0
Democratic Republic of Congo	50.3	▼1.8
Togo	50.3	▲2.5
Chad	49.9	▲0.6
Liberia	49.7	▼1.2
Central African Republic	49.1	▼0.1
Burundi	48.9	▼2.0
Mozambique	48.6	▲2.3
Turkmenistan	48.4	▲1.3
Suriname	48.1	0.0
Sudan	47.7	▼1.7
Sierra Leone	47.5	▼4.3
Kiribati	47.3	▼3.5
Djibouti	47.1	▲2.0
Ecuador	46.9	▼1.6
Algeria	46.2	▲1.5
Timor-Leste	44.2	▼3.9
Bolivia	42.3	▼1.8
Equatorial Guinea	41.0	▼1.0
Zimbabwe	40.4	▼3.6
Republic of Congo	39.7	▲0.8
Eritrea	38.9	▼2.8
Cuba	27.8	▼4.1
Venezuela	25.9	▲0.7
North Korea	5.9	▲0.1

2026 Top Index of Economic Freedom
Country	Score	Change
Singapore	84.4	▲0.3
Switzerland	83.7	0.0
Ireland	83.3	▲0.3
Australia	80.1	▲0.8
Taiwan	79.8	▲0.1
Luxembourg	79.7	▲0.2
Denmark	79.0	▼0.1
Norway	78.8	▲0.5
Estonia	78.7	▼0.2
Netherlands	78.5	▲0.3
Sweden	77.8	▼0.1
New Zealand	77.8	▼0.3
Finland	76.6	▼0.4
Canada	75.6	▲0.1
Lithuania	75.3	▲0.7
Iceland	75.0	▲2.2
Chile	74.3	▲1.1
Cyprus	74.1	▲0.9
South Korea	73.7	▼0.3
Czech Republic	73.2	▲0.3
Mauritius	73.0	▼2.0
United States	72.8	▲2.6
United Arab Emirates	71.9	▲0.3
Germany	71.7	▲0.1
Latvia	71.6	▲0.2
Cabo Verde	71.4	▲2.7
Portugal	71.2	▲0.7
Barbados	70.4	▲1.5
United Kingdom	70.4	▲1.1
Japan	70.3	▲0.1
Qatar	70.2	0.0
Uruguay	69.8	▼0.4
Austria	69.8	▲0.1
Slovenia	69.7	▲1.4
Georgia	69.6	▲0.6
Belgium	69.2	▲0.2
Costa Rica	69.1	▲0.5
Bulgaria	68.9	▲0.1
Oman	68.5	▲3.1
Poland	68.5	▲1.4
Israel	68.4	▼1.5
Jamaica	68.2	▼0.5
Malta	68.2	▲1.4
Samoa	68.0	▲1.4
Malaysia	68.0	▲0.9
Albania	68.0	▲1.4
Slovakia	67.7	▼0.7
Botswana	67.7	▼2.2
Croatia	67.5	▼1.2
Saint Lucia	67.5	▲0.5
Brunei Darussalam	67.5	▲0.5
Armenia	67.1	▲1.7
Spain	66.8	▲0.5
Seychelles	66.5	▲0.1
Paraguay	66.4	▲1.2
Peru	66.3	▲0.4
Bahrain	65.7	▲0.1
Romania	65.4	▼1.1
Saudi Arabia	65.4	▲1.0
Indonesia	65.1	▼0.1
The Bahamas	65.1	▲1.9
Serbia	65.0	▲0.6
Panama	64.9	▼0.6
Belize	64.7	▲0.5
France	64.6	▲0.2
Vietnam	64.4	▼0.8
Azerbaijan	64.3	▲1.8
Kazakhstan	64.2	▲0.4
Mongolia	63.9	▲1.3
Montenegro	63.8	0.0
Dominican Republic	63.8	▼0.5
Guatemala	63.5	▲0.1
Italy	63.3	▲2.4
North Macedonia	63.3	▲0.1
Greece	63.1	▲2.5
Bosnia and Herzegovina	63.1	▼0.4
Philippines	62.9	▲2.3
Micronesia	62.9	▲0.7
Hungary	62.5	▲1.1
Trinidad and Tobago	62.4	▼1.2
Kosovo	62.4	▲0.7
Thailand	62.2	▲1.6
Morocco	61.8	▲1.5
Vanuatu	61.1	▲2.4
São Tomé and Príncipe	60.6	▲0.2
Uzbekistan	60.3	▲2.3
Namibia	60.2	▲1.5
Benin	60.0	▲1.5
Saint Vincent and the Grenadines	60.0	▼0.1
Kuwait	59.9	0.0
Colombia	59.8	0.0
Mexico	59.8	▼1.5
Fiji	59.5	▲0.4
Jordan	59.3	▼0.1
Honduras	59.1	▼0.5
Tanzania	59.0	▼0.3
Tonga	58.9	▲0.4
Cambodia	58.7	▲0.5
Guyana	58.7	▲0.5
South Africa	58.6	▲1.3
Moldova	58.1	▼0.2
Ivory Coast	58.1	▲0.3
El Salvador	57.7	▲1.1
Eswatini	57.5	▲1.1
Bhutan	57.5	0.0
Argentina	57.4	▲3.2
Ghana	57.3	▲1.3
Madagascar	57.0	0.0
Gabon	56.6	▲0.3
Rwanda	56.5	▲1.7
Djibouti	56.3	▲0.6
The Gambia	56.3	▼0.5
Dominica	56.1	▲0.8
Kyrgyzstan	56.0	▲0.4
Ecuador	55.6	▼0.2
Kenya	55.5	▲0.7
Turkey	55.0	▼1.1
Lesotho	54.9	▲0.8
Nigeria	54.8	▲1.4
Bangladesh	54.9	▲0.1
Angola	54.4	▼0.6
Papua New Guinea	54.3	▲1.8
Mauritania	53.9	▼1.0
Solomon Islands	53.7	▼2.6
Nicaragua	53.6	▼0.4
Senegal	53.2	▼3.2
Guinea	53.1	▼1.5
Suriname	53.1	▲1.7
Nepal	52.9	▲0.4
Comoros	52.7	▲1.3
Tajikistan	52.5	▲1.0
India	52.5	▼0.5
Uganda	52.4	▲1.4
Brazil	52.4	▼2.7
Mali	52.1	▼0.5
Cameroon	52.0	▼0.1
Zambia	51.9	▲1.0
Togo	51.6	▼0.6
Chad	51.2	▼1.0
Niger	51.0	▼0.5
Laos	50.9	▼0.2
Kiribati	50.8	▼0.1
Malawi	50.7	▼0.2
Sri Lanka	50.3	▲0.9
Russia	50.3	▼1.3
Egypt	50.3	▼0.6
Liberia	49.8	▲1.3
Sierra Leone	49.6	▲1.6
Mozambique	49.6	▼1.1
Belarus	49.1	▲0.2
Burkina Faso	49.1	▼1.9
Pakistan	48.9	▼0.2
Republic of the Congo	48.6	0.0
China	48.3	▼0.7
Ethiopia	48.1	0.0
Tunisia	48.1	▼1.0
Timor-Leste	47.9	0.0
Maldives	47.6	▼0.7
Equatorial Guinea	47.4	▼0.3
Turkmenistan	47.0	▼0.1
Congo-Kinshasa	47.0	▼0.3
Haiti	46.1	0.0
Algeria	45.8	▼1.7
Myanmar	44.5	▲0.8
Guinea-Bissau	43.2	▼0.4
Lebanon	43.1	▼1.0
Central African Republic	43.1	▲0.3
Bolivia	42.4	▼1.7
Iran	41.8	▼0.7
Burundi	40.2	▲0.5
Eritrea	39.6	▲1.0
Zimbabwe	35.2	▲0.1
Sudan	32.5	▼2.8
Venezuela	27.3	▼0.3
Cuba	25.2	▼0.2
North Korea	3.1	▲0.1

=== Not ranked ===
- Afghanistan
- Andorra
- Antigua and Barbuda
- Grenada
- Hong Kong (Since 2021, counted in PR China)
- Iraq
- Libya
- Liechtenstein
- Macau (Since 2021, counted in PR China)
- Marshall Islands
- Monaco
- Nauru
- Palau
- Saint Kitts and Nevis
- San Marino
- Somalia
- South Sudan
- Syria
- Tuvalu
- Vatican City
- Yemen
