= Fraser Institute =

Canadian public policy think tank

The Fraser Institute
- Formation: 1974; 52 years ago
- Type: Public policy think tank, charity
- Headquarters: 1770 Burrard Street
- Location: Vancouver, British Columbia, Canada
- Coordinates: 49.2700°N 123.1453°W
- President: Niels Veldhuis
- Revenue: $10.5 million (2025)
- Expenses: $10.5 million (2025)
- Staff: 56 (2025)
- Website: www.fraserinstitute.org

The Fraser Institute is a libertarian Canadian public policy think tank registered as a charity. It is headquartered in Vancouver, with additional offices in Calgary, Toronto, and Montreal. It has links to think tanks worldwide through the Economic Freedom Network and is a member of the free-market Atlas Network.

In 2020, the University of Pennsylvania's Center for Think Tanks' Global Go To Think Tank Index Report ranked Fraser 14th on its "Top Think Tanks Worldwide" listing, and 1st on its list of "Top Think Tanks in Mexico and Canada".

== History ==
The Fraser Institute was founded in 1974 by Michael Walker, an economist from the University of Western Ontario, and businessman T. Patrick Boyle, then a vice-president of MacMillan Bloedel. The institute is named after the Fraser River. According to CBC News, some people allege that Michael Walker helped set up the institute after he received financial backing from forestry giant MacMillan Bloedel, largely to counter British Columbia's NDP government, then led by premier Dave Barrett. Antony Fisher, who had founded the Institute of Economic Affairs in the United Kingdom, was a co-founder.

The institute obtained charitable status in Canada on October 22, 1974, and in the United States in 1978. It is a member of the Atlas Network, which Fisher founded in 1981. Fisher was appointed acting director in 1975, until Walker became executive director in 1977.

In late 1997, the institute set up a research program emulating the UK's Social Affairs Unit, called the Social Affairs Centre. Its founding director was Patrick Basham. The program's funding came from Rothmans International and Philip Morris. When Rothmans was bought by British American Tobacco (BAT) in 1999, its funding ended, and in 2000 the institute wrote to BAT asking for $50,000 per year, to be split between the Social Affairs Centre and the Centre for Risk and Regulation. The letter highlighted the institute's 1999 publication Passive Smoke: The EPA's Betrayal of Science and Policy, "which highlighted the absence of any scientific evidence for linking cancer with second-hand smoke [and] received widespread media coverage both in Canada and the United States". At this time the CEO of BAT's Canadian subsidiary, Imasco, was also on the Fraser Institute's board of trustees.

In 1999, the Fraser Institute was criticized by health professionals and scientists for sponsoring two conferences on the tobacco industry entitled Junk Science, Junk Policy? Managing Risk and Regulation and Should Government Butt Out? The Pros and Cons of Tobacco Regulation. Critics charged the institute was associating itself with the tobacco industry's many attempts to discredit authentic scientific work.

The Fraser Institute accepted donations worth $100,000 from Philip Morris for "publishing research studies" in 2011–2012. Research produced by the Institute has previously argued that "tobacco taxation causes smuggling", a common claim by corporations in the industry that has been disputed by public health officials and critics as exaggerated and erroneous.

According to the January 2020 Global Go To Think Tank Index Report (Think Tanks and Civil Societies Program, University of Pennsylvania), Fraser is number 14 (of 8,200) in the "Top Think Tanks Worldwide" and number 1 in the "Top Think Tanks in Mexico and Canada".

== Staff ==
In April 2012, economist Niels Veldhuis was appointed president. The institute is governed by a board of trustees. Current members of the board include Peter Brown (chairman), Mark Mitchell (vice-chairman), and Edward Belzberg (vice-chairman).

Previous Directors at the Fraser Institute include:

- Antony Fisher, founder of the Atlas Network and IEA
- Michael Walker, co-founder of Fraser Institute
- Frank Rochon, Vice Chairman/NMP of Deloitte Canada
- Salem Ben Nasser Al-Ismaily, Advisor of the Ministry of Foreign Affairs of Oman
- Joni Avram, former Communications Director of the Reform Party of Canada
- Ryan Beedie, President of the Beedie Group (largest private industrial land owner, developer and property manager in Western Canada)
- Edward S. Belzberg, Jayberg Enterprises Ltd.
- Brad Bennett, former Chief Advisor to Christy Clark, former chair of BC Hydro
- Joseph C. Canavan, CEO of Assante Wealth Management
- Alex A. Chaufen, former President of Atlas Network
- Derwood Chase Jr., founder of Chase Investment Counsel Corporation, trustee of Reason Foundation and Mont Pelerin Society
- Tracie Crook, COO of McCarthy Tétrault law firm and former CEO of ResMor Trust Company
- James W. Davidson, CEO/co-founder of FirstEnergy Capital Corp. (with Rick Grafton, W. Brett Wilson, and N. Murray Edwards.

=== Board of Directors ===
The Fraser Institute's Board of Directors is mainly composed of prominent executives from corporations, financial institutions, investment capital firms, and REITs in Canada. As of August 2023, the Board was composed of:

| Name | Role | Background |
|---|---|---|
| Mark Scott | Chair | Vice-President of Abinger Property Management/Nu-West, Manager at Morguard Corporation, Board Trustee at Wardley (HSBC) China Investment Trust, Director of Asian Capital Partners, Managing Director for Scotiabank, Global Banking & Markets, President of Douglas & McIntyre Publishers, Board Director of China Education Resources, Executive Vice-President of Genesis Land Development Corporation, Managing Partner of Balfour Pacific Capital. |
| Peter M. Brown | Past Chair | Founder of Canaccord Genuity, Manager of Corporate Finance at Greenshields (Canada's oldest private brokerage), Past Chair of Vancouver Police Foundation. |
| Rod Senft | Vice-Chair, British Columbia | Lawyer at Thompson Dorfman Sweatman, Secretary/General Counsel for Cargill, Partner at Davis & Company LLP (now absorbed by DLA Piper), Managing Director of Tricor Pacific Capital Inc., Director of Pender West Capital Partners Inc., Managing Director of Tricor Pacific Founders Capital Inc., Chairman/CEO of Hines Nurseries (filed for bankruptcy in 2008) and SunGro Horticulture, Founder of Parallel49 Equity. |
| Andrew Judson | Vice-Chair, Alberta | Managing Director of Camcor Partners Inc., Director of WinSport Inc. Foundation Committee, Director/Senior Advisor at Daytona Power Corporation, Managing Director of Institutional Sales at FirstEnergy Capital Inc., Director of Pieridae Energy Limited, Lead Director of Condor Energies Inc. |
| Shaun Francis | Vice-Chair, Ontario | CEO of Medcan, Senior Vice-President of The Broadlane Group, Inc., Morgan Stanley in New York & Toronto, Founder of True Patriot Love Foundation, Board Member of Toronto Pearson International Airport, Board Member of Upper Canada College, Chair of Young Presidents' Organization, Ontario Chapter. |
| Jonathan Wener | Vice-Chair, Quebec | Founder/CEO of Canderel, Chancellor of Concordia University, Board Member of Kehilla Group Montreal, Trustee/Board Member of Jewish General Hospital Foundation, Board Member of Montreal Museum of Fine Arts, Honorary Council of Montreal Symphony Orchestra, Board Member of Laurentian Bank of Canada, Co-Chair of Federation CJA Campaign, Executive Committee of Israel Bonds/Development Corporation for Israel. |

=== Associated people ===
The institute has attracted some well-known individuals to its ranks, including politicians such as former Reform Party of Canada leader Preston Manning, former Progressive Conservative Ontario premier Mike Harris, and former Progressive Conservative Alberta premier Ralph Klein. From 1979 to 1991, the institute's senior economist was Walter Block.

== Ideology ==
The Fraser Institute describes itself as "an independent, non-partisan research and educational organization", and envisions "a free and prosperous world where individuals benefit from greater choice, competitive markets, and personal responsibility". The Fraser Institute's stated mission is "to measure, study, and communicate the impact of competitive markets and government intervention on the welfare of individuals."

Forbes has referred to the think tank as libertarian. The New York Times has described the institute as libertarian. Langley Times classified it as right-of-centre libertarian.

== Activities ==
=== Research and publications ===
The institute self-publishes a variety of reports:

- Economic Freedom Index: The institute's annual Economic Freedom of the World index ranks the countries of the world according to their degrees of economic freedom. The institute has also published regional and sub-national reports ranking the economic freedom of North America, Latin America, the Arab World, and the Francophonie. These reports are distributed worldwide through the Economic Freedom Network, a global network of 80 think-tanks.
- Human Freedom Index: Along with the Cato Institute and the Liberales Institut at the Friedrich Naumann Foundation for Freedom, the Fraser Institute publishes annual Human Freedom Index, which presents the state of human freedom in the world based on a broad measure of 76 distinct indicators that encompasses personal, civil, and economic freedom. The index presents a broad measure of human freedom, understood as the absence of coercive constraint. The index covers the following areas: Rule of Law, Security and Safety, Movement, Religion, Association, Assembly, and Civil Society, Expression, Relationships, Size of Government, Legal System and Property Rights, Access to Sound Money, Freedom to Trade Internationally, and Regulation of Credit, Labor, and Business. The Human Freedom Index was created in 2015, covering 152 countries for years 2008, 2010, 2011 and 2012. In January 2016 data for 2013 was added, covering 157 countries.
- Waiting Your Turn: Wait Times for Health Care in Canada is the institute's annual report on hospital waiting times in Canada, based on a nationwide survey of physicians and health care practitioners. The twentieth annual survey, released December 2010, found that the total waiting time between referral from a general practitioner and delivery of elective treatment by a specialist, averaged across 12 specialties and 10 provinces surveyed, had risen from 16.1 weeks in 2009 to 18.2 weeks in 2010.
- Survey of Mining Companies: Published annually, the global Survey of Mining Companies ranks the investment climates of mining jurisdictions around the world, based on the opinions of mining industry executives and managers.
- Global Petroleum Survey: An annual survey of petroleum executives regarding barriers to investment in oil- and gas-producing regions around the world.
- Canadian Provincial Investment Climate: A series of reports measuring the extent to which Canadian provinces embrace public policies that contribute to, and sustain, positive investment climates.
- Firearms reports. The Fraser Institute issued a number of articles and statements opposing Canadian gun control laws, including firearms registry.
- School Report Cards: Every year, the institute publishes a series of School Report Cards ranking the academic performance of schools in British Columbia, Alberta, Ontario, Quebec, and Washington state based on the publicly available results of standardized testing mandated and administered by the provinces. The website www.compareschoolrankings.org allows users to compare up to five schools at once, based on a variety of performance indicators.
- Tax Freedom Day: The institute's annual Tax Freedom Day report calculates the day the average Canadian family has paid off the total tax bill and royalties imposed on them and corporations by all levels of government. In 2016, Tax Freedom Day was June 7 with $45,167 (42.9 per cent of income) having been collected per family. The institute also offers a personal Tax Freedom Day calculator.
- The institute publishes three magazines: Fraser Forum, a bi-monthly review of public policy in Canada; Perspectives, a French-language review of public policy in Quebec and la Francophonie; and Canadian Student Review, a look at current affairs written for students, by students.
- In March 2010, the institute released Did Government Stimulus Fuel Economic Growth in Canada? An Analysis of Statistics Canada Data, a report critical of the Harper government's Economic Action Plan, concluding that the stimulus package did not have a material impact on Canada's economic turnaround in the latter half of 2009.

=== Other initiatives ===
==== Children First ====
Canada's first privately funded program of its kind, Children First: School Choice Trust, offers tuition assistance grants to help parents in financial need send their children to an independent school of their choice. The program was discontinued in 2012.

==== Donner Awards ====
Canada's largest non-profit recognition program, the Donner Canadian Foundation Awards for Excellence in the Delivery of Social Services recognize non-profit social service agencies that, despite budget limitations, excel in terms of management and service delivery. Winners are selected every year in a variety of categories, and share in $60,000 prize money.

==== School Chain Showcase ====
A global database of school chains, the multilingual website allows anyone to connect with school chain operators around the world.

=== Education programs ===
The institute periodically hosts free seminars across Canada for students, teachers, and journalists, focusing on key economic concepts and timely issues in public policy. In 2010, the institute hosted eight one-day student seminars, attracting more than 775 participants.

The Fraser Institute also offers an internship program, to which more than 431 individuals applied in 2010.

== Funding ==
As a registered charity with the Canada Revenue Agency, the institute files annual registered charity information returns. The institute also files annual returns to the U.S. Internal Revenue Service, where it is registered as a nonprofit 501(c)(3) organization. The institute depends on contributions from individuals, corporations, and foundations. It does not accept government grants or payments for research; however, individual donors may claim tax credits for donations and corporate donors may claim tax deductions. The Fraser Institute ceased disclosing its sources of corporate funding in the 1980s.

In its first full year of operation, 1975, the institute reported revenues of $421,389. In 1988, revenues exceeded $1 million, and in 2003, $6 million. In 2022, the institute reported having almost CA$12 million in annual revenue.

In 2012, the Vancouver Observer reported that the Fraser Institute had "received over $4.3 million in the last decade from eight major American foundations including the most powerful players in oil and pharmaceuticals". According to the article, "The Fraser Institute received $1.7 million from 'sources outside Canada' in one year alone, according to the group's 2010 Canada Revenue Agency (CRA) return. Fraser Institute President Niels Veldhuis told The Vancouver Observer that the Fraser Institute does accept foreign funding, but he declined to comment on any specific donors or details about the donations."
