= Human Capital =

Human capital is the personal skills and knowledge of value to an organization or society.

Human Capital may also refer to:

- Human Capital (2013 film), an Italian drama directed by Paolo Virzì
- Human Capital (2019 film), an American-Italian drama directed by Marc Meyers
- Human Capital (magazine), a Singaporean human resources publication
- Human Capital Index, a report by the World Bank
- Human Capital Institute, an American management institute
