= Senegal and the World Bank =

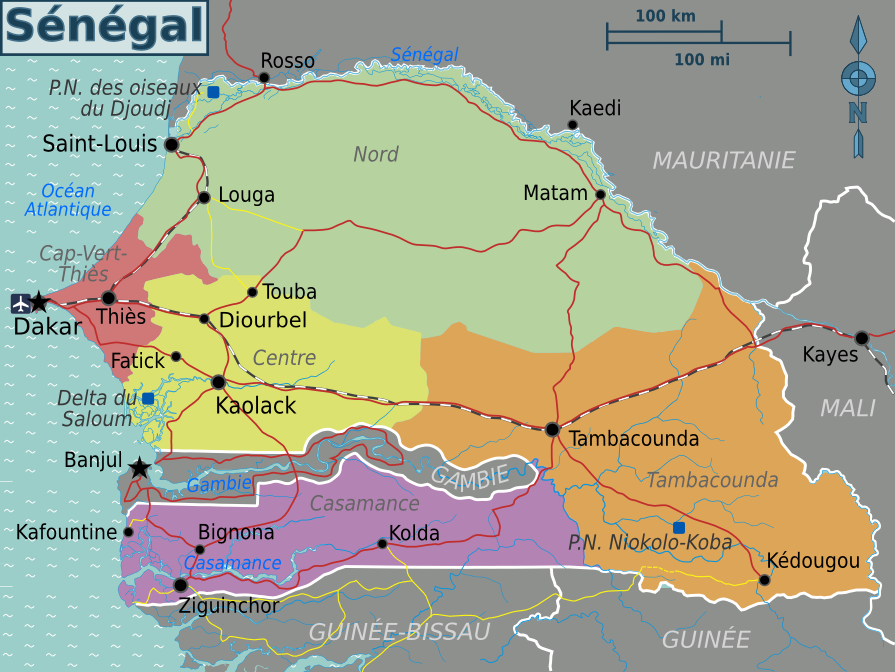
Map of Senegal.

Senegal has been a member of the World Bank since August 31, 1962. Senegal is located in West Africa and shares borders with Mauritania, Mali, Guinea, and Guinea-Bissau. Senegal also surrounds Gambia and has shorelines along the Atlantic Ocean.

== Senegal ==
Senegal has stood out as one of the most politically stable countries in the region since their independence in 1960. The country has also been able to remain largely unaffected by regional security shocks. However, increasing organized terrorist activity in neighboring countries could introduce the risk of instability.

Since 2014, Senegal has experienced a growth rate of a minimum 6% with positive future projections. The growth rate accelerated to 7% in 2017 and maintained at 6% during 2018. Growth projections in Senegal are expected to continue as offshore oil and gas operations are expected to begin in 2022. Until then, Senegal is facing fiscal pressure due to fixed domestic energy prices that are cheaper than international oil prices resulting in increased subsidies and lower revenues. The deficit for Senegal increased to 3.5% for the year 2018, growing half a percent from the previous year 2017. Public debt continues to grow in Senegal but remains listed as a low risk of distress due to GDP rebasing. Senegal was able to increase GDP by 30% through rebasing with Eurobond. Debt was estimated to be 60.6% of GDP in 2017 and increased to 64.5% in 2018.

Senegal's poverty rate was last measured in 2011 and had a national poverty rate of 46.7% and 38% using the international poverty line. No new household consumption data has been made available but, estimates place the poverty rate at 34% in 2017, and expect it to fall to 31% in 2020. Senegal has also seen an increase in primary education enrollment from 69.3% in 2000 to 80.95% in 2018. Senegal has also seen an increase in life expectancy at birth from 57% in 2000 to 67.38% in 2017.

== History with World Bank ==
Senegal has had a long history of cooperation with the World Bank and is currently engaged in over 30 projects from the World Bank. In addition, the estimated total cost of the projects currently active from the World Bank is estimated to be $1.8 billion dollars. Senegal has also established similar indicators of progress to that of the World Bank. The World Bank initiated the World Bank Group's Human Capital Project as a global effort to increase the effectiveness and development of human capital through policymaking and investing. This initiative focuses on helping countries achieve these goals and has even established its own set of indicators to track and monitor progress. In order to be able to measure the success of the program, the World Bank established a Human Capital Index (HCI). The HCI targets how human capital contributes to the production of the economy as well as the projections for the future. The three main indicators are; (1) survival, (2) school, and (3) health. In following these guidelines Senegal has been approved for projects that address and focus on these three issues.

== Select programs ==
=== National Social Safety Net System ===
In order to provide financial security to the most vulnerable people and poor regions, the International Development Association (IDA) approved a $40.5 million credit package to aid Senegal in the establishment of a national social safety net system. The safety net functions as a conditional cash transfer program that provides qualified candidates with 25,000 West African CFS francs or $50 USD every quarter for 5 years. A condition of the program is that children are required to attend school during the 5 years. The Government of Senegal established the program to provide financial security for the poor and education opportunities. The beneficiaries of the program are selected by using community and geographical data that provides guidelines for selecting the most vulnerable and in need people. In 2016, of the 280,000 households in the registry, 180,000 were already receiving the benefits from the program. An added benefit of the program is the new capacity to respond to crises. Cash transfers can be used as tools to respond to humanitarian crises and create new methods of more immediate and required responses according to needs. On January 3, 2019 the IDA approved a second round of financing for the social safety net program and loaned another credit package of $57 million USD. The extension of funds were to address specific issues in regards to sustainability, institutionalization, and upscale of the use of the key frameworks. Component 1 of this project was to establish the Safety Net System and has so far been a success. Component 2 of the project was aimed at being able to provide a cash transfer service for low income households and has been able to provide transfers to farmers, beneficiaries, and as a use for productive exchanges.

=== Senegal Rural Water Supply and Sanitation Project ===
The development objective of this project is to be able to provide people from rural communities with safe and equitable water sanitation and services. This project also focuses on providing people with proper methods of water resource management as well as oversight of water services. The project was approved on June 22, 2018 at an estimated total cost of $130 million USD. In many countries water is still not a fully guaranteed utility due to social economic barriers that make it difficult to provide water to all people. The main barriers to universal access in Senegal are the lack of funds for the government to maintain and provide consistent water to rural communities as well as lack of funds for rural communities to be able to seek private investment form resource providers. There are four main components to this project that address the issues of water access. The first component is the improvement of the rural water supply system that requires the upgrading of already existing systems as well as opening new routes for accessibility. The second component focuses on sanitation services and provides rural communities with household ad community toilets to be able to maintain clean water sources and clean communities. The third component of this project discusses the issues with water resource management and provides the community with training on water management and pre-planning for water resource use and allocation. The final component of this project prepares the community for project coordination and increased capacity building so that the needs of the community can be fulfilled with the water supply systems and training of the community.

=== Investing in Maternal, Child and Adolescent Health ===
Senegal in September 26, 2019 received a $140 million USD loan from the IDA to expand the government capacity for nutritional services for women and kids. The project seeks to provide necessary funds for government projects aimed at improving the health and nutritional condition of women and children in low socioeconomic areas. The first component of the project is to improve the availability and quality of reproductive, maternal, newborn, child, and adolescent health and nutrition (RMNCAH-N) packages. This component will seek to achieve this by increasing the availability and quality of health workers, mobile midwives, and medical resources available so that rural communities are also receiving the same level of care as urban communities. The second component of this project is to promote adolescent health and women’s empowerment. The project has developed multiple strategies to implement this component through the use of mass media, social and behavioral changes in communities, life and employment skills training, and cash transfers to adolescent girls to help keep them in school or to enroll them in schools. The third component is supporting reforms to strengthen governance, equity, and financing sustainability in the health sector. The project seeks to remove any previous barriers that barred people from necessary services.
