= Simeon Dyankov =

Bulgarian economist (born 1970)

- Симеон Дянков
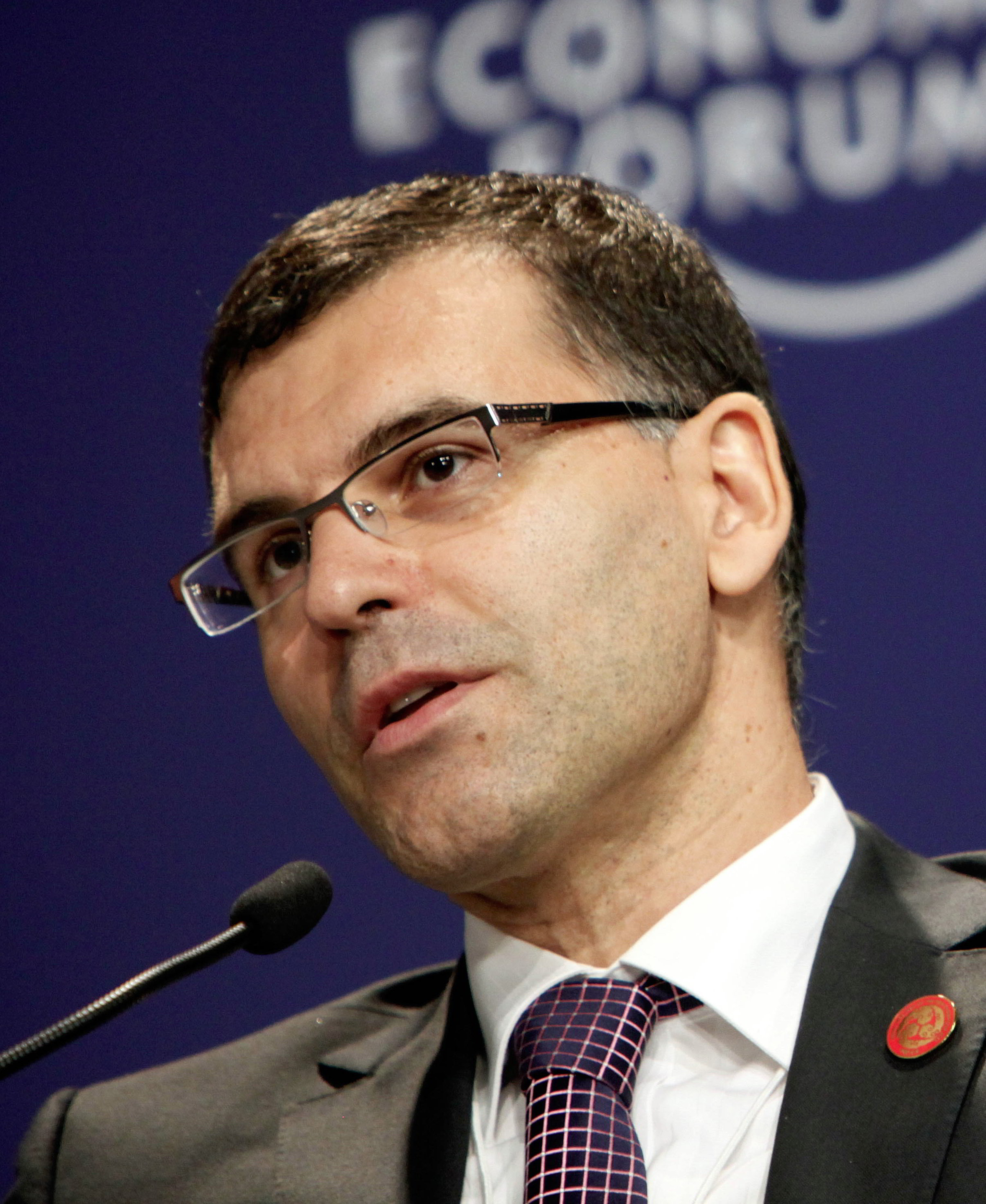
- Dyankov at World Economic Forum, Tianjin, China, September 13, 2010

Deputy Prime Minister of Bulgaria
- In office July 27, 2009 – March 13, 2013 Serving with Tsvetan Tsvetanov
- Prime Minister: Boyko Borisov
- Preceded by: Ivaylo Kalfin; Emel Etem Toshkova
- Succeeded by: Ekaterina Zakharieva

Minister of Finance
- In office July 27, 2009 – March 13, 2013
- Prime Minister: Boyko Borisov
- Preceded by: Plamen Oresharski
- Succeeded by: Kalin Hristov

Personal details
- Born: July 13, 1970 (age 56) Lovech, Bulgaria
- Education: University of Michigan; University of National and World Economy

Simeon Dyankov (Bulgarian: Симеон Дянков, also Djankov; born July 13, 1970) is a Bulgarian economist and chairman of the Fiscal Council since March 2025. From 2009 to 2013, he was the deputy prime minister and minister of finance of Bulgaria in the government of Boyko Borisov. He has been a vocal supporter of Bulgaria's entry into the Eurozone. Before his cabinet appointment, he was the chief economist of the finance and private sector vice-presidency of the World Bank.

At the World Bank, Dyankov was director for development policy and senior director in the office of the chief economist. Dyankov was involved in the publication of Women Business and the Law, World Development Reports and Doing Business reports. The Doing Business reports were discontinued after an audit documented that Dyankov, along with then World Bank CEO Georgieva, pressured staff to make data for China and Saudi Arabia look better.

He was an associate editor of the Journal of Comparative Economics from 2004 to 2009. Dyankov was a chairman of the board of the European Bank for Reconstruction and Development. From 2013 to 2015, he was appointed rector of the New Economic School in Moscow. Since November 2015, Dyankov has been director for policy of the Financial Markets Group at the London School of Economics.

Since April 2020, Dyankov has been policy director at the Financial Markets Group at the London School of Economics. He has also been a senior fellow at the Peterson Institute for International Economics. He has written widely on the economic impact of the 2022 Russian invasion of Ukraine.

== Early life ==
Dyankov was born in Lovech, Bulgaria, on July 13, 1970. He attended Ekzarh Yosif I high school in Lovech (1984–1989). In 1989, he passed the entrance exam to the Karl Marx Institute of Economics (now University of National and World Economy). He holds a 1997 doctorate from the University of Michigan, on the topic "Three Essays on the Economics of Transition". His main thesis advisor was Alan Deardorff.

== Academia ==
Dyankov has published in journals such as American Economic Review, The Quarterly Journal of Economics, the Journal of Political Economy, The Journal of Finance and the Journal of Financial Economics. He co-edited the book The Resolution of Financial Distress with Stijn Claessens and Ashoka Mody.

Dyankov was one of the creators of the Human Capital Index, first published in the World Development Report 2019, which he co-directed. The academic study describing the index construction was published in the leading science journal Nature.

=== Harvard Kennedy School ===
After leaving the government of Boyko Borisov, Dyankov joined the Harvard Kennedy School as visiting faculty. His teaching is focused on the politics of development. At Harvard, Dyankov edited a special issue of the Journal of Comparative Economics on the 25th anniversary from the start of transition in Eastern Europe. Jointly with Anders Aslund at the Atlantic Council, he co-wrote a book on the transformation from communism. The book contains chapters by Leszek Balcerowicz on Poland, Václav Klaus on the Czech Republic, Lajos Bokros on Hungary, Ivan Mikloš on Slovakia and Mart Laar on Estonia.

=== New Economic School ===
In October 2013, it was announced that the board of directors of the private Moscow-based university New Economic School (NES), also known as the Russian Economic School, had approved Dyankov as its rector. During his tenure as rector, the New Economic School moved to a new campus in the Skolkovo Innovation Center. Sergey Guriyev was the Rector at New Economic School (NES) until he resigned on 30 April 2013 and fled to France. In July 2014, Dyankov himself was put on a draft list under Russian foreign agent law and shortly resigned.

=== London School of Economics ===
Dyankov is the policy director at the Financial Markets Group, responsible for a large research project on post-Covid recovery. The project shows that the pandemic caught governments in developing economies off guard, and that governments in Africa reacted in ways that pushed more people into the informal economy. In advanced economies the pandemic opened a larger gender gap in employment, while bankruptcies actually fell due to generous government support schemes, further expanding the inequality of opportunity between men and women.

His research is also on the rising income inequality in Russia, including due to autarky. The Russian economy looks inward, with imports down nearly 20% in 2022. Previous periods of autarkic policies in Russian and Soviet history have resulted in economic backwardness. Vladimir Putin's presidency has accelerated the rise of Russian oligarchs:

"Closeness to Putin substitutes for the rule of law that usually protects private property in mature democracies. Such protection is mercurial, however. On occasion, billionaires fall out of favor and their assets are up for grabs."

His research on contagious protests, which draws on the Arab Spring events, is cited in numerous global newspapers. Another line of research investigates economic sanctions.

=== Think tanks ===
In 2008, Dyankov established the think-tank Ideas42, jointly with Antoinette Schoar (MIT Sloan), Eldar Shafir (Princeton) and Sendhil Mullainathan (Harvard). Dyankov joined the Peterson Institute for International Economics in 2013 and re-joined it in 2020, working primarily on former socialist economies. In a 2016 lecture at the Kyiv School of Economics he argued that:

"The one reform that is the most difficult to figure out how to do in Ukraine, is reducing the role of the oligarchs. Even after 25 of transition in a number of countries, including Russia and Ukraine, the oligarchs still control not just business life but also public life, which prevented major political and economic changes."

== World Bank ==
Dyankov has worked for the World Bank since 1995, initially focusing on privatization and enterprise restructuring. In 1997, he participated in a World Bank enterprise restructuring project in Georgia. For his work in the transformation of the Georgian economy, he was awarded an honorary doctorate from the Free University of Tbilisi in June 2021. Dyankov also led World Bank projects on state-owned enterprise restructuring in Moldova. This work restarted after Russia's invasion of Ukraine, under the aegis of the European Commission, with a state-owned enterprise strategy published in February 2023. Dyankov led two World Bank projects in Ukraine and continues to be involved in proposals on financing the post-war recovery. These proposals involve large amounts of aid from Western donors as well as reparations by Russia. The priorities uniformly focus on rebuilding human capital and infrastructure.

=== 1997 Asian Financial Crisis ===
Dyankov participated in several World Bank financial sector restructuring projects during the 1997 Asian financial crisis. Based on these projects, he published a series of articles on corporate governance in East Asia with Stijn Claessens.

=== The World Development Report 2002 ===
World Development Report 2002 analyzed how to build effective institutions. The study was guided by Joseph Stiglitz, with Simeon Djankov as a principal author. Several background papers, including by Nobel Prize winners Robert Shiller, Amartya Sen and Gabriel García Márquez, were published in academic journals or books.

=== The World Development Report 2019 ===
The World Development Report 2019 was led by Djankov and Federica Saliola. A summary of the main arguments and data is provided in the Journal of International Affairs. Fears that robots will take jobs from people have dominated the discussion over the future of work, but the World Development Report 2019 finds that on balance this appears to be unfounded.

=== Doing Business report and scandal ===
Dyankov is the creator of the annual Doing Business report, the top-selling publication of the World Bank Group. The report came out of joint research work with Professor Andrei Shleifer at Harvard University and was inspired by Dyankov's experience in overly-regulated socialist economies. In a 2016 article for the Journal of Economic Perspectives, Dyankov explains how Doing Business started and lists academic papers that serve as background research for the report.

The report has its origins in a 2002 paper published in The Quarterly Journal of Economics under the title "The Regulation of Entry". The study presents data on the regulation of entry of start-up firms in 85 countries covering the number of procedures, official time and official cost that a start-up must bear before it can operate legally. The main findings of the paper are that: "Countries with heavier regulation of entry have higher corruption and larger unofficial economies, but no better quality of public or private goods. Countries with more democratic and limited governments have lighter regulation of entry." The paper became widely known, with over seven thousand academic references, because it provides quantitative evidence that entry regulation benefits politicians and bureaucrats without adding value to the private sector or granting any additional protection.

The reports were discontinued following an independent audit of the data irregularities. The audit documented how Dyankov, along with the World Bank CEO Georgieva, pressured staff to manipulate the results, in particular making data for China and Saudi Arabia look better. The board of the IMF, after a separate review, found that Georgieva had not "played an improper role". Georgieva is managing director of the IMF. An improved Doing Business analysis is proposed in Fraser Institute's 2022 Economic Freedom of the World report. This analysis outlines the start of a new report, to be housed at a top research institution.

In October 2023, The Economist summarized the impact of the project, tracing its origins back to Austrian economist Friedrich Hayek. Both Hayek and the Doing Business authors over-promised on the effects of regulatory reform.

=== Women Business and the Law ===
The World Bank's annual study, Women Business and the Law, was inspired by the book Women and the Law. The study is based on methodology described in Djankov, Pinelopi Koujianou Goldberg and Marie Hyland in Gendered Laws and Women in the Workforce. The study extends to country reform cases, for example in Burundi, Rwanda, Zambia and Zimbabwe, all countries where customary law prevails.

=== Human Capital Index ===
The Human Capital Index is an annual measurement prepared by the World Bank. The applications to measuring human capital are developed by Noam Angrist, Simeon Djankov, Pinelopi Koujianou Goldberg and Harry Patrinos in the scientific journal Nature. These findings are extended in a 2021 article. The index is used in country studies of employment and wages, for example in Ukraine after Russia's invasion.

== Political career ==
Dyankov has been both deputy prime minister and minister of finance of Bulgaria.

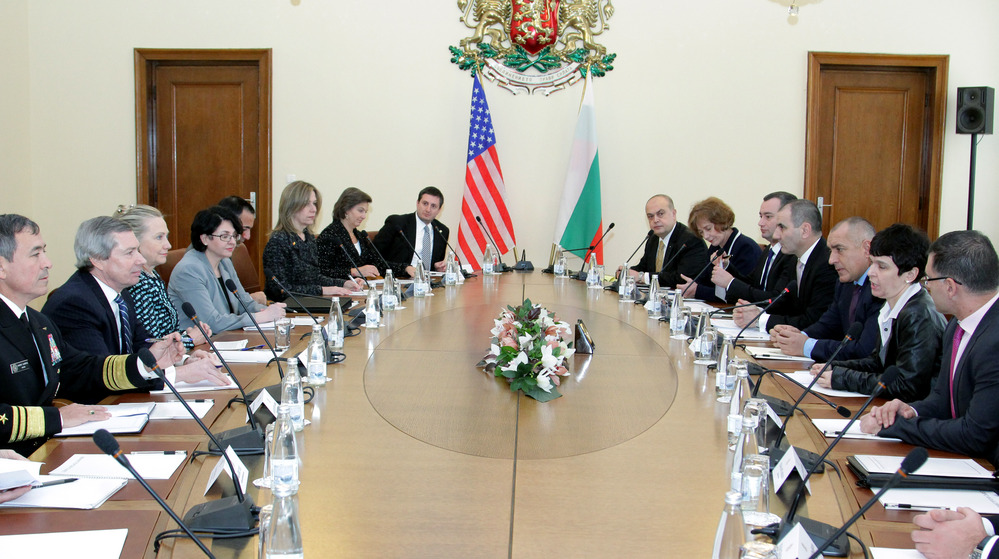
U.S. Secretary of State Hillary Clinton (center left) in Sofia in 2012, with Simeon Djankov (first on the right)

In February 2025 he was nominated to chair the Fiscal Council, responsible for the stability of public finances in Bulgaria.

=== Minister of finance of Bulgaria ===
On July 27, 2009, Dyankov became minister of finance of Bulgaria. He reduced budget spending and managed to cut the budget deficit for 2009 to 4.4%. In 2010, Bulgaria met the Maastricht criteria – 3%, falling to 2% in 2011 and 0.45% in 2012. On December 1, 2009, Standard and Poors upgraded Bulgaria's investment outlook from "negative" to "stable", the only country in the European Union to receive an upgrade that year.

On numerous occasions as minister, Dyankov stated that two successive terms were needed to complete the reforms that would lead Bulgaria from poorest to middle-income country by Central European standards. Soon after, Parliament adopted the so-called "Golden Rules" in the organic budget law: the government cannot surpass a deficit of 2% of GDP and a debt-to-GDP ratio of 40% in any given year. Dyankov was a member of the GERB cabinet, but not a party member.

At the second GERB party congress, Dyankov urged delegates to lead such policies that the party would win a second term with full majority in parliament. This was needed, he said, to complete the reforms that would lead Bulgaria from poorest to middle-income country by Central European standards. Soon after, Parliament adopted the so-called Golden Rules in the organic budget law: the government cannot surpass a deficit of 2% of GDP and a debt-to-GDP ratio of 40% in any given year. Dyankov believes in his role as an expert rather than a politician and even though he is a member of the GERB cabinet, he is not a member of the GERB party.

In February 2013, Dyankov resigned in protest of the decision by the prime minister, Boyko Borisov, to advance subsidies to farmers. On February 20, 2013, Borisov announced the resignation of the government due to increasing levels of violence in the protests about high electricity prices. Dyankov continued as finance minister until a caretaker government was formed a month later.

=== Chairman of the fiscal council ===
Parliament elected Simeon Djankov to chair the Fiscal Council on March 27, 2025. He was nominated by the GERB-UDF parliamentary group and elected in a 118-17 vote, with 12 abstentions. The MPs also approved four other members of the Council: Lyubomir Datsov, nominated by GERB-UDF, Desislava Kalcheva (GERB-UDF), Bogomil Manov (nominated by BSP-United Left) and Atanas Atanassov (nominated by There Is Such a People). The candidate of the Democracy, Rights, and Freedoms, Erdoan Ahmedov, did not receive enough votes. After their election, the chair and four members of the Fiscal Council took an oath before the National Assembly. They were elected for a term of six years.

=== Flat tax ===
Dyankov was a proponent of the flat tax, introduced in Bulgaria in 2009 and expanded to dividend tax in 2010–2011 during his term in office. Bulgaria is the only country with a ten percent rate on personal, corporate and dividend taxes. In 2022–2023, Dyankov assisted parliamentarians in Ukraine in developing a flat-tax proposal.

=== Eurozone entry ===
On two occasions during Simeon Djankov's term in office, in 2010 and 2013, Bulgaria attempted to enter the European Exchange Rate Mechanism, the precursor to the Eurozone. In both cases the European debt crisis prevented such entry, first due to the crisis in Greece and later in Portugal. The attempts at joining the Eurozone elicited strikes in early 2013 and demands for Djankov's dismissal. This experience is analyzed in a 2016 book, co-authored with Anders Aslund.

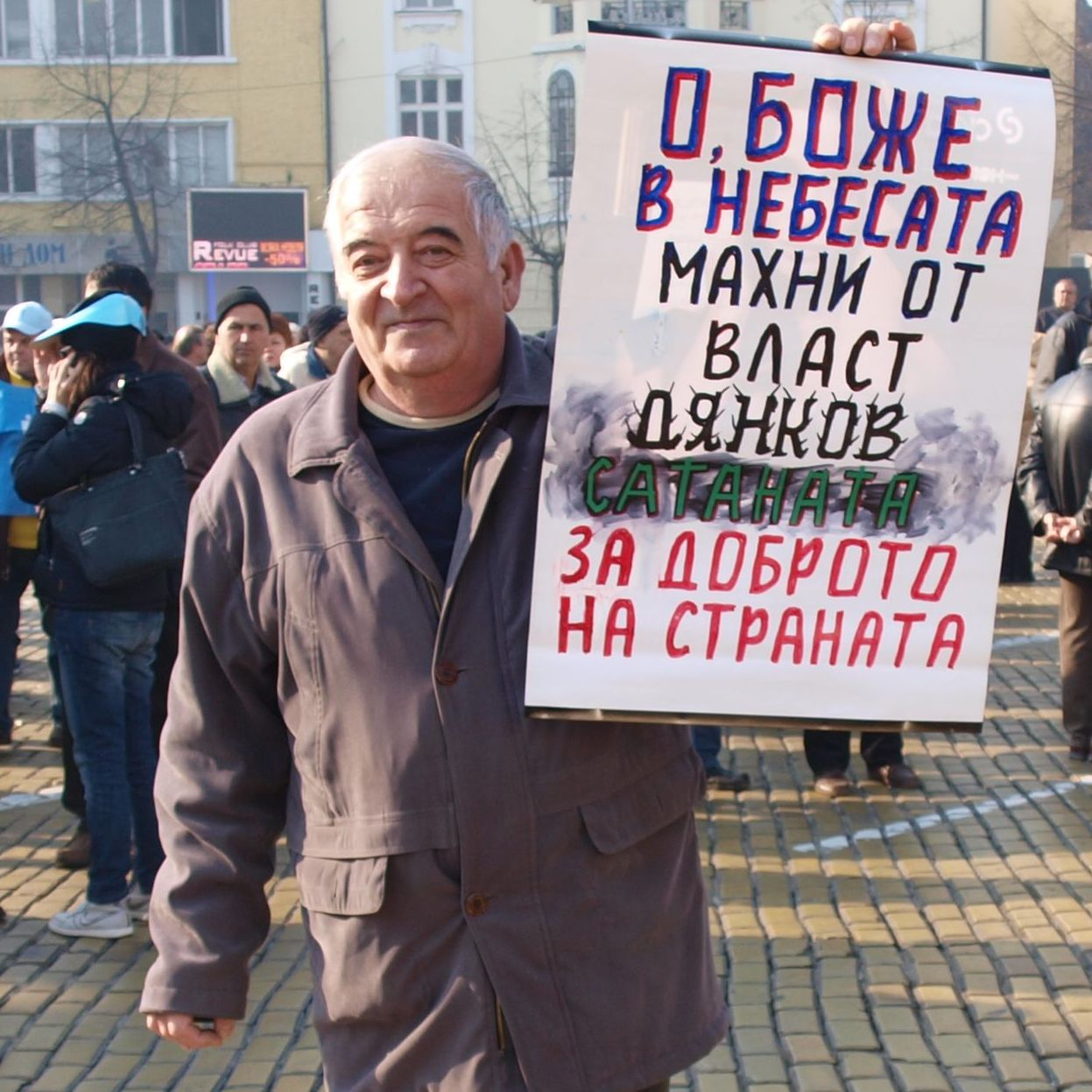
A Bulgarian citizen on strike in February 2013 holding a sign "Simeon Djankov is Satan"

Bulgaria's entry into the European Exchange Rate Mechanism finally took place in 2020, while entry into the Eurozone has been postponed till 2025 at the earliest. Dyankov has proposed policies for inflation-abatement in order to meet the Euro convergence criteria, including ways to abate inflation and reduce the budget deficit.

=== Ban on Russian nuclear technology ===
Dyankov is a strident critic of the use of Russian nuclear technology in Bulgaria and while in government in 2012, along with Minister of Energy Delyan Dobrev, adopted a ban on such technology, including the termination of the Belene Nuclear Power Plant. Prime Minister Boyko Borisov listed this ban among the main successes of his first government. In July 2023, his party GERB initiated a sale of the unused Russian nuclear equipment to Ukraine, through a resolution in parliament.

While in government, Dyankov held negotiations with Russia's nuclear technology producer Rosatom and memorably said:

"We have shown that we are not afraid of either Russia or Russian energy giants. If it need be, we will spank them."

== Archeology ==
As finance minister, Dyankov started a program for financing archeological work around the Black Sea, along the ancient Roman Via Pontica. The program came out of an archeological discovery in Sozopol of what is believed to be the relics of John the Baptist. Dyankov was among the first to see the relics. These archeological finds were developed to attract tourists.

== Political ancestry ==
Dyankov's great-great-grandfather was one of the founders of Bulgaria's parliament after the liberation from the Ottoman Empire. He was a close associate of Vasil Levski in organizing the April Uprising of 1876. He served in the first four parliaments from 1879 to 1886, representing Sevlievo region.

== Selected publications ==
- Hoekman, Bernard; Djankov, Simeon (1996). "The European Union's Mediterranean Free Trade Initiative". The World Economy. 19 (4): 387–405. doi:10.1111/j.1467-9701.1996.tb00686.x. S2CID 15198895.
- Hoekman, Bernard, and Djankov, Simeon (1997), "Determinants of the Export Structure of Countries in Central and Eastern Europe", World Bank Economic Review, 11, 3: 471–487.
- Djankov, Simeon; Hoekman, Bernard (November 1998). "Conditions of Competition and Multilateral Surveillance". The World Economy. 21 (8): 1109–1128. doi:10.1111/1467-9701.00184.
- Claessens, Stijn; Djankov, Simeon; Mody, Ashoka (2001). Resolution of Financial Distress: An International Perspective on the Design of Bankruptcy Laws. World Bank Publications. ISBN 978-0-8213-4906-9.
- Djankov, Simeon; Miguel, Edward; Qian, Yingyi; Roland, Gérard; Zhuravskaya, Ekaterina (May 1, 2005). "Who Are Russia'S Entrepreneurs?" (PDF). Journal of the European Economic Association. 3 (2–3): 587–597. doi:10.1162/jeea.2005.3.2-3.587. ISSN 1542-4766.
- Djankov, Simeon; Qian, Yingyi; Roland, Gérard; Zhuravskaya, Ekaterina (May 1, 2006). "Entrepreneurship in China and Russia Compared" (PDF). Journal of the European Economic Association. 4 (2–3): 352–365. doi:10.1162/jeea.2006.4.2-3.352. ISSN 1542-4766. S2CID 153450128.
- Djankov, Simeon; Ganser, Tim; McLiesh, Caralee; Ramalho, Rita; Shleifer, Andrei (2010). "The Effect of Corporate Taxes on Investment and Entrepreneurship" (PDF). American Economic Journal: Macroeconomics. 2 (3): 31–64. doi:10.1257/mac.2.3.31. S2CID 8461632.
- Anders Åslund; Simeon Djankov (2014). The great rebirth : lessons from the victory of capitalism over communism. Washington, District of Columbia. ISBN 978-0-88132-698-7. OCLC 896853258.
- Djankov, Simeon; Nikolova, Elena; Zilinsky, Jan (2016). "The happiness gap in Eastern Europe". Journal of Comparative Economics. 44 (1): 108–124. doi:10.1016/j.jce.2015.10.006.
- Hyland, Marie; Djankov, Simeon; Goldberg, Pinelopi Koujianou (2020). "Gendered Laws and Women in the Workforce". American Economic Review: Insights. 2 (4): 475–490. doi:10.1257/aeri.20190542.
- Angrist, Noam; Djankov, Simeon; Goldberg, Pinelopi K.; Patrinos, Harry A. (April 15, 2021). "Measuring human capital using global learning data". Nature. 592 (7854): 403–408. Bibcode:2021Natur.592..403A. doi:10.1038/s41586-021-03323-7. ISSN 0028-0836. PMC 8046667. PMID 33692542.
