= Andrew Kuchins =

American political scientist (born 1959)

Andrew C. Kuchins
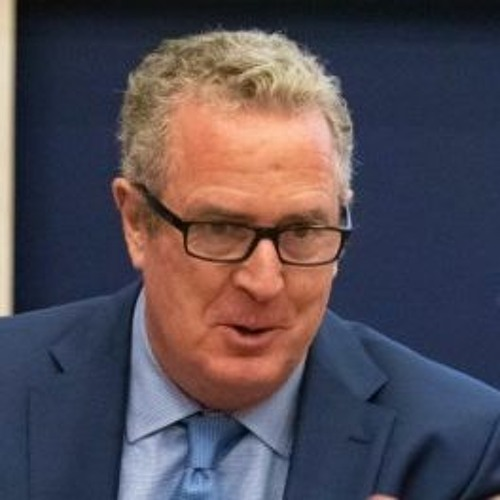
- Born: February 13, 1959 (age 67); California, United States
- Known for: Political Scientist, focusing on Soviet Union, Russia, Central Asia, China
- Spouse: Lilia Torshina
- Children: 2

Academic background
- Education: Johns Hopkins University Paul H. Nitze School of Advanced International Studies (Ph.D.) International Relations; Johns Hopkins University Paul H. Nitze School of Advanced International Studies (M.A.) International Relations; Amherst College B.A. in Russian studies Pushkin Institute, Moscow, certificate of proficiency in Russian language
- Thesis: “Cognitive Change and Political Entrepreneurship: The Evolution of Soviet Policy toward China from 1976-89”

Academic work
- Institutions: American University of Central Asia; Georgetown University; Center for Strategic and International Studies; Carnegie Endowment for International Peace; Carnegie Moscow Center; Stanford UniversityCenter for International Security and Cooperation; John D. and Catherine T. MacArthur Foundation; Berkeley- Stanford Program on Soviet and Post-Soviet Studies

Andrew Carrigan Kuchins is an American political scientist, academic, and former head of American University of Central Asia. He has held senior positions at several think tanks, including Carnegie Endowment for International Peace, Center for Strategic and International Studies and Carnegie Moscow Center. Kuchins has written numerous books, articles, book reviews. He has been interviewed on mainstream and academic outlets including as CNN, Politico, The New York Times, The Washington Post, Washington Times, The Moscow Times, Chicago Tribune and CS Monitor. Additionally, Kuchins has given testimony before the United States Congress on Russia, Central Asia and the Caucasus.

== Early life and education ==
Kuchins was born in 1959. He holds a B.A. in Russian studies from Amherst College and a certificate of proficiency in Russian language from the Pushkin Institute in Moscow. He earned his M.A. in International Studies and his Ph.D. in International Relations from Johns Hopkins University at the Paul H. Nitze School of Advanced International Studies,

== Think tank and academic career ==
From 2000 through 2007 Kuchins held a series of positions with the Carnegie Endowment for International Peace, including as Director of the Carnegie Moscow Center and Director of Carnegie's Russian and Eurasia Program. From 2007 to 2015 he was Director of the Russia and Eurasian Program at the Center for Strategic and International Studies in Washington, D.C. Kuchins then was Senior Fellow and research professor at the Center for Eurasian, Russian, and East European Studies at the School of Foreign Service at Georgetown University.

== American University of Central Asia ==
In February 2019, the Board of Trustees of the American University of Central Asia (AUCA) announced that Kuchins would become President of the university starting in May 2019. The American University of Central Asia is an international, multidisciplinary learning community in the American liberal arts tradition affiliated with Bard College.

In April 2021, Kyrgyz police summoned Kuchins for questioning regarding the alleged importation of unauthorized narcotics.

"The state-sanctioned battle against progressive elements in Kyrgyzstan deepened over the weekend with the police summoning the American head of a Western-style university in Bishkek for questioning."

Despite the charges, there were "indications security services are involved in smear exercises," and according to the AUCA board of trustees "the medicine involved is approved for use in the United States, was prescribed for his use by his doctor in the U.S. for a medical condition … and was sent to him by mail from one of the largest U.S. pharmacies in the ordinary course of its business."

Shortly after, over 50 academics issued a statement in support of Andrew Kuchins and criticized the charges:

"It is with alarm that we have been monitoring what strongly appears to be an effort to smear one of Kyrgyzstan’s leading academic institutions, the Bishkek-based American University of Central Asia (AUCA).

This effort is most prominently symbolized by a criminal case recently launched against AUCA President Andrew Kuchins, an esteemed and long-time member of PONARS Eurasia known for his support of academic freedom and the broadly cross-national scholarly community. In the strongest possible terms, we call on the relevant authorities to immediately drop the drug-dealing charge against Kuchins—a meritless case that risks discrediting the country’s law-enforcement system in international eyes—and to restore Kyrgyzstan’s long-standing status as the Central Asian region’s leader in academic freedom.

Unfortunately, this is not an isolated incident, and we stand united with scholars around the world in urging a reversal of concerning trends in Kyrgyzstan."

At the June 2021 virtual commencement, Kuchins announced that he would be stepping down as President of AUCA and returning to the United States. The board of the trustees of the university thanked him for his service, particularly during the COVID-19 pandemic. In July 2021, Kuchins was fined 60,000 Kyrgyz soms (approximately US$710) and expelled from Kyrgyzstan.

== Personal life ==
Kuchins is married to Lilia Torshina. He has two children from a previous marriage and lives in Chevy Chase, Maryland. He speaks Russian, French and Spanish. Kuchins is a member of the Metropolitan Club (Washington, D.C.).

== Select publications ==
- “China Policy towards Russian and Europe” in David B.H. Denoon, ed., China's Grand Strategy: A Roadmap to Global Power, New York University Press, June 15, 2021.
- “The Energy Factor in Russia’s Asia Pivot” in Mike Mochizuki and Deepa Olalapoly, eds., Energy Security in Asia and Eurasia, Routledge, 2016.
- “Russian Power Rising and Falling Simultaneously” in Ashley Tellis, ed., Strategic Asia: 2015-2016: Foundations of Power in the Asia-Pacific, National Bureau of Asian Research, 2015.
- “Both Epicenter and Periphery: U.S. Interests in Central Asia” in David B.H. Denoon, ed., China, the United States, and the Future of Central Asia, New York University Press, 2015.
- “Russia’s Contested National Identity and Foreign Policy” with Igor Zevelev in Henry R. Nau and Deepa M. Ollapally, eds., Worldviews of Aspiring Powers: Domestic Foreign Policy Debates in China, India, Iran, Japan, and Russia, New York: Oxford University Press USA, 2012.
- “The Obama Administration’s Reset Button for Russia,” in Russia: The Challenges of Transformation, Dmitri Trenin and Piotr Dutkiewiz, New York: New York University Press, 2011.
- Russia after the Global Financial Crisis with Anders Aslund and Sergey Guriyev, Washington: Peterson Institute for International Economics, 2011.
- The Russia Balance Sheet with Anders Aslund, Washington: Peterson Institute/CSIS, 2009.
- "The Obama administration's 'reset button' for Russia", The Obama Moment, EU Institute for Security Studies, 2009.
- Russia: The Next Yen Years, Washington: Carnegie Endowment for International Peace, 2004.
- Rough Crossing: Democracy in Russia, Moscow: Carnegie Endowment for International Peace, 2004.
- Russia after the Fall, Washington: Carnegie Endowment for International Peace, 2002.
- Russia and Japan: An Unresolved Dilemma between Distant Neighbors with Tsuyoshi Hasegawa and Jonathan Haslam, Berkeley: University of California/International and Area Studies, 1993.

== Select professional activities ==
- Member, Valdai Discussion Club
- Adjunct Professor, Johns Hopkins University, School of Advanced International Studies, 2007-2015
- Adjunct Professor, Georgetown University, 2001-2002
- Member of editorial board for Pro et Contra, Demokratizatsia and Washington Profile.
- Member of Advisory Committee for Project on Basic Research and Higher Education (jointly managed by the US Civilian Research and Development Foundation and the Russian Federation Ministry of Education), 1997- 2003.

== Congressional testimony ==
- Statement to the U.S House of Representatives, Subcommittee on Counterterrorism and Intelligence of the Committee on Homeland Security, “Assessing Terrorism in the Caucasus and the threat to the Homeland”, Hearing, April 3, 2014.
- “Prospects for Engagement with Russia”, testimony before the United States Senate Committee on Foreign Relations, March 19, 2009.
- “Russian Democracy and Civil Society: Back to the Future,” testimony before the Commission on Security and Cooperation in Europe, February 8, 2006.

== See also ==
- American University of Central Asia
- Amherst College
- Georgetown University
- Center for Strategic and International Studies
- Carnegie Endowment for International Peace
- Carnegie Moscow Center
- John D. and Catherine T. MacArthur Foundation
- Johns Hopkins University Paul H. Nitze School of Advanced International Studies
- Pushkin Institute
- Stanford University
- Valdai Discussion Club
