= Luc Laeven =

Dutch economist

Luc Laeven (born June 22, 1974 in Klimmen) is a Dutch economist, director-general of the research department of the European Central Bank 2015–present. Previously he held senior posts at the International Monetary Fund and the World Bank. He was also a Professor Finance at Tilburg University from 2009 to 2019. He has been a research fellow at the Centre for Economic Policy Research in London since 2009.

== Early life and education ==
Laeven studied econometrics at Tilburg University from 1992 to 1996. He then completed his Master in International Finance at the University of Amsterdam in 1997. He studied at the London School of Economics from 1998 to 1999 and completed his PhD in economics at the University of Amsterdam in 2001.

== Career ==
After having completed his undergraduate and graduate studies in econometrics and international finance in 1997, Laeven worked for a year as a management trainee in the Amsterdam and London offices of ABN Amro Bank. He then went on to study at the London School of Economics and Political Science in the MPhil in Finance program, before finishing his PhD in economics at the University of Amsterdam in 2001, with a dissertation Essays on Financial Intermediation in Developing Countries written under the supervision of professor Sweder van Wijnbergen. He joined the World Bank the same year as a financial economist in its private sector and financial sector vice presidency, contributing to research and policy advice on financial sector issues in developing countries. He was then brought in by Raghuram Rajan, the chief economist of the International Monetary Fund, to help build a macro-financial linkages unit in the Research Department of the International Monetary Fund, first as senior economist and then as deputy division chief. After this, he became the lead economist of the research department of the International Monetary Fund, working closely with its chief economist Olivier Blanchard, and led mission work to member countries, the production of board papers and discussion notes, and country review work. Following this career at the International Monetary Fund, Laeven became the director-general of the Directorate General Research of the European Central Bank in 2015, where he leads a department of about 65 staff in its two areas of responsibility: research and policy advice. The department conducts economic research and provides research-based policy advice to the European Central Bank's decision-making bodies on issues relevant to the conduct of monetary policy, central bank operations, financial stability, and banking supervision.

His research focuses on banking and international finance issues, and has been widely published in top academic journals, including the American Economic Review, the Journal of Finance, the Journal of Financial Economics, and the Review of Financial Studies. His research output ranks among the top 150 economists globally according to RePEC.

== Other activities ==
Research Fellow, Financial Economics Programme, Centre for Economic Policy Research (CEPR), London, 2009–present. Research Associate, European Corporate Governance Institute (ECGI), 2006–2016. Managing Editor, International Journal of Central Banking, 2020–present. Co-Editor, International Journal of Central Banking, 2016–2019. Associate Editor, Journal of Financial Stability, 2018–present. Associate Editor, Journal of International Money and Finance, 2013–present. Associate Editor, Journal of Financial Intermediation, 2013–present. Associate Editor, Journal of Money, Credit, and Banking, 2012–present.

== Awards ==
Laeven is a recipient of the 2014 Rising Star in Finance Award, jointly awarded by Stern School of Business of New York University, Fordham University and Rensselaer Polytechnic Institute.

== Selected publications ==
=== Books ===
- Systemic Risk, Crises, and Macroprudential Regulation. By Xavier Freixas, Luc Laeven and José-Luis Peydró. Cumberland: MIT Press, 2016. ISBN 9780262028691
- Deposit Insurance Around the World Issues of Design and Implementation. By Aslı Demirgüç-Kunt, Edward J. Kane and Luc Laeven. Cambridge, MA: MIT Press, 2008. ISBN 9780262042543
- Systemic Financial Crises: Containment and Resolution. By Patrick Honohan and Luc Laeven. Cambridge: Cambridge University Press, (2005).(pb, 2012) ISBN 9781107407206
- Deposit Insurance Around the Globe: Where Does It Work? By Aslı Demirgüç-Kunt, Edward J. Kane and co-eds .Washington, DC: World Bank, Development Research Group, Finance, 2001. ISSN 1073-2489

=== Journal articles ===
- "Bank Leverage and Monetary Policy’s Risk-Taking Channel: Evidence from the United States". J. Finance 2017, 72 (2): 613–654. With Dell’Ariccia, Giovanni and Suarez, Gustavo doi:10.1111/jofi.12467.
- "A Lost Generation? Education Decisions and Employment Outcomes during the Housing Boom-Bust Cycle of the 2000s". Am. Econ. Rev. 2016, 106 (5): 630–635. With Popov, Alexander. doi:10.1257/aer.p20161085.
- "Does the Geographic Expansion of Banks Reduce Risk?". J. Fin. Econ. 2016, 120 (2): 346–362. With Goetz, Martin and Levine, Ross. doi:10.1016/j.jfineco.2016.01.020.
- "Bank Valuation and Accounting Discretion During a Financial Crisis". J. Fin. Econ. 2012, 106 (3): 614–634. With Huizinga, Harry. doi:10.1016/j.jfineco.2012.06.008.
- "Flight Home, Flight Abroad, and International Credit Cycles". Am. Econ. Rev. 2012, 102 (3): 219–224. With Giannetti, Mariassunta. doi:10.1257/aer.102.3.219.
- "The Flight Home Effect: Evidence from the Syndicated Loan Market During Financial Crises". J. Fin. Econ. 2012, 104 (1): 23–43. With Giannetti, Mariassunta. doi:10.1016/j.jfineco.2011.12.006.
- "Bank Governance, Regulation, and Risk Taking". J. Fin. Econ. 2009, 93 (2): 259–275. With Levine, Ross. doi:10.1016/j.jfineco.2008.09.003.
- "Political Connections and Preferential Access to Finance: The Role of Campaign Contributions". J. Fin. Econ. 2008, 88 (3): 554–580. With Claessens, Stijn; Feijen, Erik. doi:10.1016/j.jfineco.2006.11.003.
- "Capital Structure and International Debt Shifting". J. Fin. Econ. 2008, 88 (1): 80–118. With Huizinga, Harry and Nicodème, Gaetan. doi:10.1016/j.jfineco.2007.05.006.
- "Is There a Diversification Discount in Financial Conglomerates?", J. Fin. Econ. 2007, 85 (2): 331–367. With Levine, Ross. doi:10.1016/j.jfineco.2005.06.001.
- "Banking Crises, Financial Dependence, and Growth". J. Fin. Econ. 2007, 84 (1): 187–228. With Kroszner, Randall and Klingebiel, Daniela. doi:10.1016/j.jfineco.2006.05.001.
- "Entry Regulation as a Barrier to Entrepreneurship". J. Fin. Econ. 2006, 82 (3): 591–629. With Klapper, Leora and Rajan, Raghuram. doi:10.1016/j.jfineco.2005.09.006.
- "Financial Development, Property Rights, and Growth". J. Fin. 2003, 58 (6): 2401–2436. With Claessens, Stijn. doi:10.1046/j.1540-6261.2003.00610.x.
