= Women and the Law =

1984 book by Susan Atkins and Brenda Hale

- Title page for Women and the Law (1984)
- Author: Susan Atkins and Brenda Hale
- Publication date: 1984
- ISBN: 9781911507123

Women and the Law is a 1984 book by Susan Atkins and Brenda Hale (then known as Brenda Hoggett). The authors described the book as the first published in the United Kingdom to "comprehensively to examine the gendered nature of the law itself and the legal inter-relationships between women's private and public lives and between men and women". Hoggett and Atkins felt that the book "...took women's experiences in life as its starting point, rather than conventional legal categories".

In a 2004 profile of Hale, The Guardian described Women and the Law as "the first comprehensive survey of women's rights at work, in the family and in the state". The book concluded by stating that "Deep-rooted problems of inequality persist and the law continues to reflect the economic, social and political dominance of men".

The book was republished in 2018 to mark the 100th anniversary of the Sex Disqualification (Removal) Act 1919 that allowed women to become solicitors in the United Kingdom.

== Women Business and the Law ==
Women and the Law inspired the World Bank annual study Women Business and the Law, which collects data on gendered laws in 190 countries from 1970 to today. The study is based on methodology described in Simeon Djankov, Pinelopi Koujianou Goldberg and Marie Hyland in Gendered Laws and Women in the Workforce. In 2022 the John Templeton Foundation issued a grant on Women’s Empowerment, Economic Freedom, and the Role of Law in Driving Prosperity to the London School of Economics for extending the analysis to country case studies.
