= The World Development Report 2011 =

Document by the World Bank

2011 World Development Report
- Author: World Bank staffers
- Language: English Overview is available in Arabic, Chinese, French, Portuguese, Russian, and Spanish
- Subject: Global development, organised violence
- Genre: Non-fiction
- Publisher: World Bank
- Publication date: April 2011
- Publication place: International
- Media type: PDF (free via web), Paperback, Hardback
- Pages: 352
- ISBN: 978-0-8213-8439-8 (Softcover), 9780821385005 (hardback)
- Preceded by: World Development Report 2010

The 2011 World Development Report: Conflict, Security and Development (WDR) is a document by the World Bank on the challenges organised violence poses to the advancement of less developed countries. The report finds that over the last 30 years poverty has been reduced for most of the world's population - but this is not the case for the estimated 1.5 billion people living in countries blighted by on-going conflict. Not one low income country suffering from on-going violence has achieved a single Millennium Development Goal. Once mass violence takes root in a society, it can take a generation or more to restore stability.

Organised violence as defined by the report includes civil and inter-state war as well as the violence resulting from criminal activity, especially drug and human trafficking. The WDR does not address interpersonal and domestic violence, though it acknowledges they are also relevant to development.

The report finds that overall mass conflict has become less prevalent over recent decades, with the average number of worldwide battle deaths dropping from 164,000 per year in the 1980s to only 42,000 in the 2000s. But the 1.5 billion living in conflict wracked states have not benefited from this trend. A new form of mass violence plagues their countries, with cycles of political violence alternating with periods where as many or more die from criminal activity.

Despite the difficulties in overcoming a legacy of conflict, violence or authoritarian rule, several countries have made impressive progress including Chile, Colombia, Ghana, Indonesia, Mozambique, South Africa and Timor-Leste. The report offers lessons drawn from these past successes. The World Bank stress that their report does not proscribe standard fixes suitable for all, and that efforts to resolve conflicts should be nationally led from within affected countries. Workable solutions will have to be tailored to each set of individual circumstance. Yet the WDR does find that previous successful efforts share many common features, which are reflected in the report's WDR framework.

== Key Messages ==
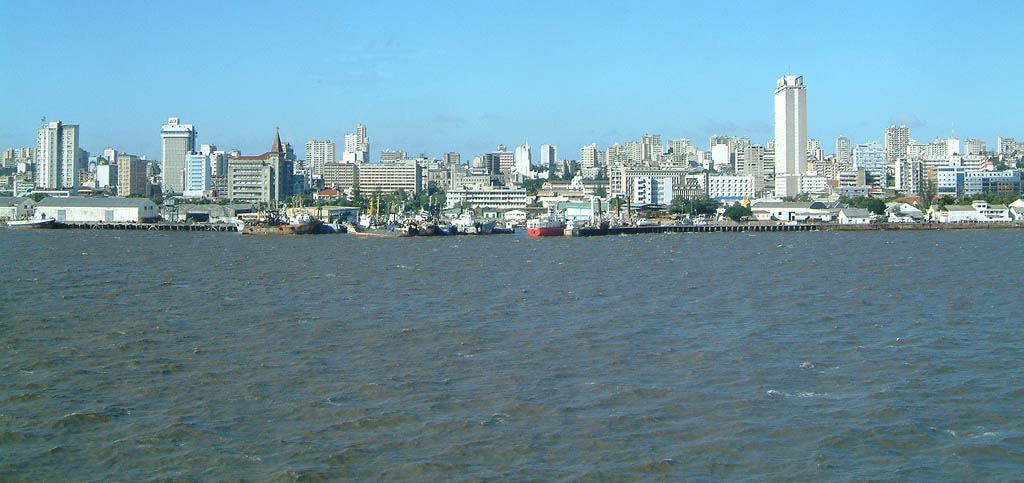
Maputo, the capital of Mozambique, a country cited by the report as making good progress in resolving conflict and subsequently in boosting economic growth and reducing poverty.

According to World Bank president Robert Zoellick in his forward to the report, the five key messages are:

1. "Institutional legitimacy is the key to stability." Institutions must be trusted to deliver if they are to reduce violence and promote peace. Often levels of trust among various stakeholders must be raised before necessary institutional transformation is attempted, and crucial to this end are quick wins − actions that produce early tangible results.

2. "Investing in citizen security, justice, and jobs is essential to reducing violence." The report finds that unemployment is widely considered to be the no 1 reason for youths to join both criminal gangs and contending armies. To address this, the WB states that it will henceforth focus more on promoting job creation. The WDR also acknowledges that existing development agencies do not yet have the capacity to adequately help fragile states build up police forces and justice systems, even though aid in building an army is more readily available.

3. "Confronting the challenge effectively" requires change. Development agencies including the WB itself have not yet fully adapted to the needs of the 21st century which are very different from those of the 20th. Instead of rebuilding nations devastated by a huge but one off war, they must address cycles of violence typically involving not just political conflict but also criminal activity such as trafficking. Greater speed, collaboration and staying power are needed for these new challenges. Also needed is a willingness to accept greater risk that not all aid efforts will be fruitful, and a greater emphasis on crisis prevention and early de-escalation of violence rather than post crises intervention which can consume vastly more resources.

4. "A layered approach" is needed. Many issues are best addressed on multiple levels - locally led efforts are essential but they often need to be complemented by national, regional and international action. Collaboration between development and humanitarian organisations, NGOs and TNOs, private sector and grass roots initiatives − especially women's groups − are all vital components of the most efficient solutions to the problems being faced.

5. "The global landscape is changing." Middle income and regional institutions such as the ANC are now playing a much larger role in shaping global affairs than was the case a few decades ago, which needs to be recognised by those involved in crafting and executing solutions to development problems.

== The report creation process ==
Although the World Bank produces World Development Reports annually, the 2011 report was two years in the making, written by a team led by World Bank directors Sarah Cliffe and Nigel Roberts. The writing process for the 2011 WDR marked a departure from previous reports, in that consultation was broader and deeper. Consultation extended beyond discussion with the traditional parties − representatives of OECD donor countries, leading academics, other multilateral and bilateral agencies - to reach out to, among others: leaders from the private sector and civil society; national reformers; local and regional leaders, especially those working in conflict affected countries. To further broaden the discussion process, use was made of new media technologies, including videos, blogs, and Twitter feeds. The actual document was not the sole or final end of the creation process – it also sought to foster an ongoing global conversation that will enhance the knowledge and collaborative capabilities of all the different actors working to speed development and resolve conflicts; a dialogue that will continue into the future interacting with everything from the UN's global policy making to the execution of local efforts by grass roots organisations. Rather than merely record the opinion of western experts, the report seeks to distill the world's collective experience and the recommendations of everyone involved in tackling the challenges of development and peace promotion.

== The WDR framework ==
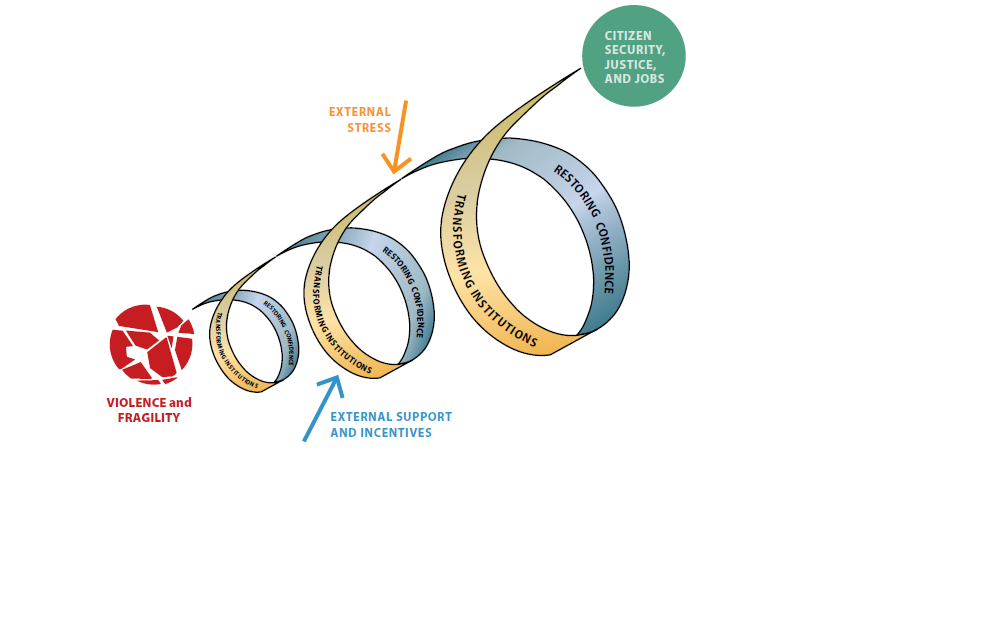
The WDR framework depicts conflict resolution as a cyclical process where periods of confidence building among stakeholders alternate with the strengthening of legitimate institutions.

The WDR framework is a process model showing how countries can break free of cycles of violence by establishing legitimate and effective institutions to promote stability and prosperity. Rather than being a top-down recommendation from the World Bank, the framework reflects the experiences of what worked best for various countries which have already successfully overcame prolonged violence. Case studies showing this are given for Ethiopia, Ghana, Indonesia, Mozambique, Rwanda and many other countries. The two key stages identified are confidence building and institutional transformation. The report details a number of "core tools" for use during each stage, which have been commonly used by those countries which have successfully resolved their long-running conflicts.

To create conditions where attempts at institutional transformation are likely to succeed, various factions with the power to make or break the undertaking need to gain confidence that the transformation will deliver worthwhile results. Two key tactics for building trust are for national governments to deliver early, tangible results that demonstrate a commitment to reform and work through building "inclusive enough" coalitions. After delivering any available "quick wins", the coalitions build national and local support for peaceful change. Getting previously competing factions to work together often requires signals of a clean and irreversible break with the past.

Once sufficient trust has been built up to attempt institutional transformation, the first priority is to increase the capability of institutions to provide security, justice and jobs. As experience has shown there is a limit to how much change a society can absorb at one go, it is rarely advisable to attempt a "big bang" transformation that will achieve everything at once. Rather a "virtuous cycle" seems to work best, with alternating periods of confidence building and institutional transformation. Both the key stages should be nationally led, but the framework encourages international agencies to provide much needed support, and to help guard the process from being derailed by external stress. The WDR says the cycle can often take a generation to reach the end goal, which will involve the formation of stable, legitimate institutions able to support a satisfactory standard of citizen security, justice and jobs.

== Synopsis ==
As of April 2011 the report had been published in two versions: a 65-page overview and a 352-page full version. The full version includes a forward, an acknowledgments, a notes section, a glossary, the overview, and three main parts sub-divided into a total of nine chapters.

=== Part 1: The Challenge ===
==== Chapter 1: Repeated violence threatens development ====
The opening chapter reviews evidence suggesting that repeated cycles of civil conflict and criminal violence are a major factor retarding development in the countries and regions they afflict. The chapter highlights the devastating effect mass violence has on the over 1.5 billion living in countries severely affected by it. The WDR also summarises progress made in reducing war and battle deaths, showing how countries such as Ethiopia, Rwanda and Mozambique were able to make very rapid development progress once mass violence had been alleviated.

==== Chapter 2: Vulnerability to violence, ====
Chapter two discusses the role played by external and internal stresses in triggering mass violence. A case is made arguing that a critical reason why some societies are more vulnerable than others to outbreaks of violence is the lack of quality institutions able to reconcile competing factions and peacefully address grievances held by sectors of the populations. The WDR argues that while elite pacts between rival leaders can deliver short term peace, violence generally soon reoccurs unless stability can be reinforced by impersonal institutions and good governance.

=== Part 2: Lessons from national and international bodies ===
==== Chapter 3: From violence to resilience: Restoring confidence and transforming institutions ====
This chapter introduces the WDR framework.

==== Chapter 4: Restoring confidence: Moving away from the brink ====
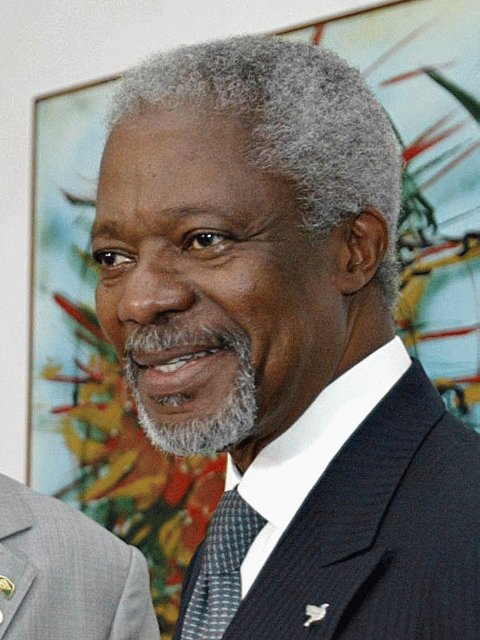
Ghanaian diplomat and former head of the UN, Kofi Annan. Successful efforts within Ghana to overcome violence are discussed in chp 4.

Chapter four focuses on the ways previous efforts have successfully built trust as a prelude to instuitional transformation in countries such as Chile and Indonesia. Both case studies and previous academic work are used to show that while it is important to build "inclusive enough" coalitions for positive change, they need not be all-inclusive, especially at the early stages of the process. Signaling a clean break with the past is also emphasised as important, as is the early delivery of tangible results. The WDR shows that national leaders driving the process often enlist help from non state actors – from both the civil and international sector.

==== Chapter 5: Transforming institutions to deliver security, justice, and jobs ====
Chapter 5 is about the institutional reforms which can deliver security, justice and jobs for citizens in conflict wracked countries. The WDR emphasises that it is often essential to avoid becoming stuck trying to implement "perfect" reforms; instead early efforts should focus on pragmatic "best fit" solutions. Two other dimensions considered are the pace and prioritisation of reforms. Case studies such as the reforms initiated in China by Deng Xiaoping are presented to support the case that a gradual pace, with progressive transformations taking place over a generation, is most likely to succeed. The WDR advises that early efforts should be prioritised towards reforms that deliver citizen security, justice and jobs. While it offers numerous specific practical suggestions, the report emphasises that the best choices for each individual country should be assessed on a case by case bases by the national reform leaders.

==== Chapter 6: International support to building confidence and transforming institutions ====
The WDR argues that building confidence and transforming institutions should be a nationally led process, but that international support is also often needed. The report finds that though international support has sometimes been a key factor in successful reform efforts, as was the case in Colombia and Mozambique, it is often inadequate. This chapter shows that various international actors typically lack the capability to provide meaningful support on their own, but also are often pulled in different directions by their own domestic pressures. Excessive fear of risk taking often leads to initiatives that have a high but still uncertain chance of delivering highly beneficial returns being passed over in favour of much less effective efforts which are chosen for their minimal risk. These and other factors prevent international actors combining their efforts to best effect. Other issues identified with international support are at excessive emphasis on post-conflict support as opposed to prevention, and a lack of capability for supporting job creation.

==== Chapter 7: International action to mitigate external stresses ====
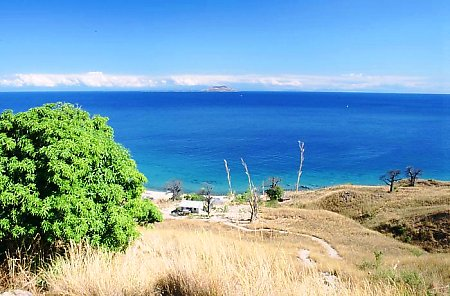
Lake Malawi in the Great lakes region of Africa. Chp. 7 contains a case study showing how regional cooperation involving 7 neighboring countries was crucial to reducing the conflict that raged in this area from 2002 to 2009.

External threats aggravating violence in fragile states often include trafficking, outside political influences favouring particular groups within a country, as well as food or water insecurity and other economic shocks. This chapter reviews how regional and international actors can help countries address these stresses. The WDR emphasises that certain cross border threats are best dealt with at regional level, providing cases studies to show how this has been successfully accomplished.

=== Part 3: Reducing the Risks of Violence—Directions for International Policy ===
==== Chapter 8: Practical country directions and options ====
Chapter 8 is addressed to both government and civil society strategic decision makers within affected countries who are trying to reduce organised criminal and political violence. It draws together some of the concepts from earlier chapters and provides insights from successful transitions in countries including South Africa and Colombia.

==== Chapter 9: New directions for international support ====
This chapter suggests new directions for international policy and institutions. The report notes how the trans national organisations set up after WWII achieved considerable success in reducing the number of wars, and that after the cold war ended new tools were developed which successfully reduced the number of civil wars. But comparable tools are not yet in place for dealing with the 21st century forms of mass violence, where some countries have suffered more deaths from organised criminal violence than they did while being ravaged by a traditional war. The final chapter discusses how this shortfall in international capability can be rectified.

== Reception ==
The NGO International Alert which specialises in addressing violence hailed the report as a "game changer". They write it is a "tremendously important" signal that the World Bank has so strongly acknowledged how critical it is for legitimate institutions to be in place which can resolve conflict by non-violent means. While International Alert predict the report will become a seminal work, they admit there is a risk some will merely praise it and then consign the report to the book shelf.

Some of the early press coverage merely summarised the report, picking out example case studies, without assessing the report's accuracy or likely impact. Media based in countries near to centres of violence have tended to focus on the reports findings for their immediate region.

Commenting on a draft version of the report, the New York Times noted how the World Bank blamed its own lack of flexibility for slow progress in East Timor. While broadly welcoming the report, Jonathan Glennie for The Guardian regrets that there was no mention of the Paris Declaration on Aid Effectiveness.

Martin Wolf writing for the Financial Times opines that the report is too long to obtain the attention it deserves. He summarises what he considers to be the most important messages of the report and urges his readers to assist with efforts to reduce organised violence.

== See also ==
- Least developed country
- List of ongoing military conflicts
