= Brenda Hale, Baroness Hale of Richmond =

British judge (born 1945)

The Right Honourable The Baroness Hale of Richmond DBE PC FBA
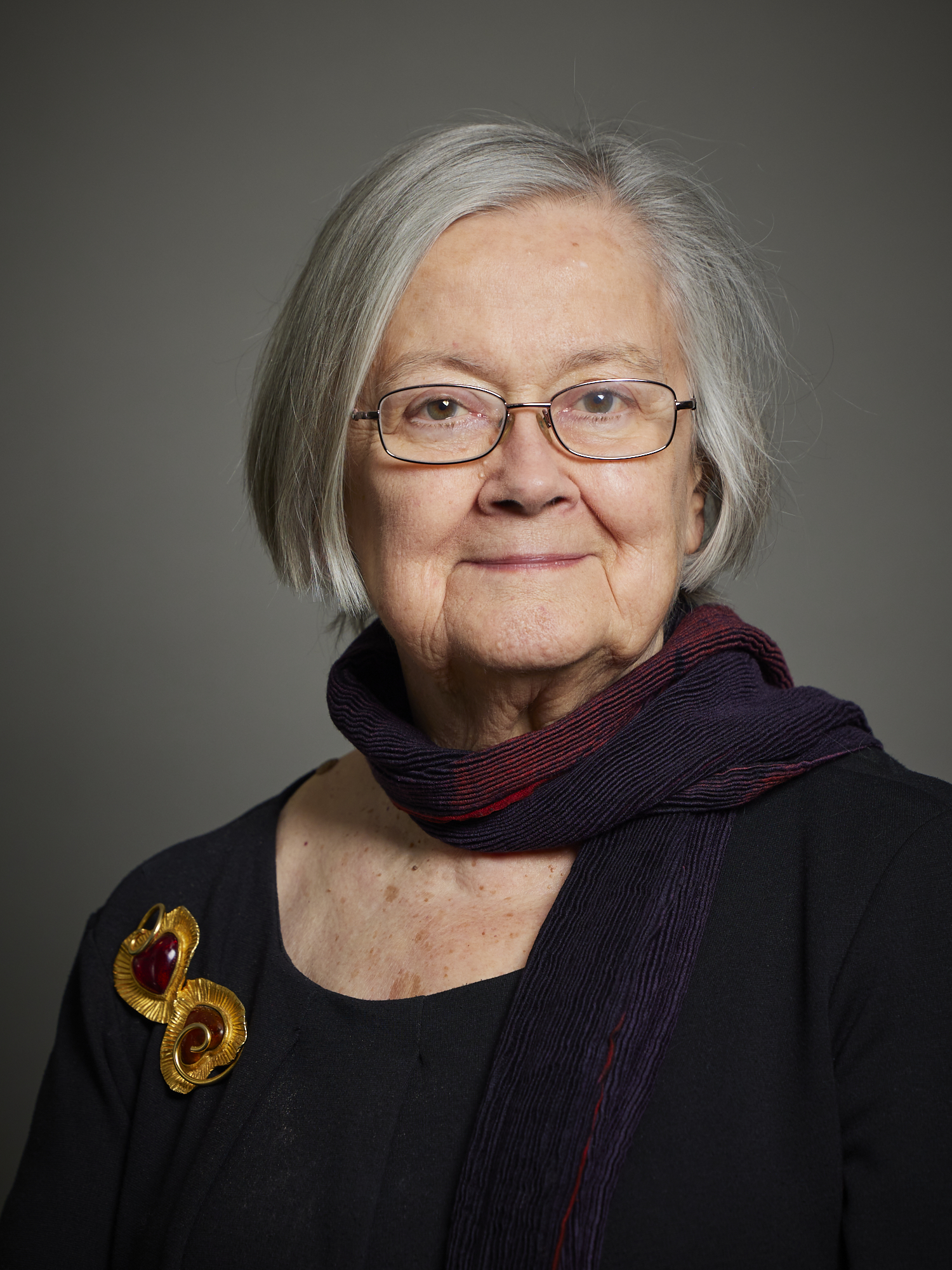
- Official portrait, 2024

President of the Supreme Court of the United Kingdom
- In office 5 September 2017 – 11 January 2020
- Nominated by: David Lidington
- Appointed by: Elizabeth II
- Deputy: The Lord Mance; Lord Reed
- Preceded by: The Lord Neuberger of Abbotsbury
- Succeeded by: The Lord Reed of Allermuir

Deputy President of the Supreme Court of the United Kingdom
- In office 28 June 2013 – 4 September 2017
- Nominated by: Chris Grayling
- President: The Lord Neuberger of Abbotsbury
- Preceded by: The Lord Hope of Craighead
- Succeeded by: The Lord Mance

Justice of the Supreme Court of the United Kingdom (Note: Lord of Appeal in Ordinary until 30 September 2009)
- In office 12 January 2004 – 28 June 2013
- Preceded by: The Lord Millett
- Succeeded by: Lord Hamblen of Kersey

Lady Justice of Appeal
- In office 1999–2003

High Court Judge
- In office 1994–1999
- Appointed by: Elizabeth II

Member of the House of Lords
- Lord Temporal
- Lord of Appeal in Ordinary; 12 January 2004

Non-Permanent Judge of the Court of Final Appeal of Hong Kong
- In office 30 July 2018 – 29 July 2021
- Appointed by: Carrie Lam

Personal details
- Born: Brenda Marjorie Hale; 31 January 1945 (age 81) Leeds, West Riding of Yorkshire, England
- Spouses: John Hoggett (m. 1968; div. 1992); Julian Farrand (m. 1992; died 2020)
- Children: Julia Hoggett
- Education: Girton College, Cambridge

Chinese name
- Chinese: 何熙怡
Transcriptions
Yue: Cantonese
- Yale Romanization: Hòh Hēi Yìh
- Jyutping: Ho^{4} Hei^{1} Ji^{4}

Brenda Marjorie Hale, Baroness Hale of Richmond (born 31 January 1945) is a British judge who served as President of the Supreme Court of the United Kingdom from 2017 until her retirement in 2020.

In 2004, she joined the House of Lords as a Lord of Appeal in Ordinary. She is the only woman to have been appointed to that position. She served as a Law Lord until 2009 when she, along with the other Law Lords, transferred to the new Supreme Court as a result of the Constitutional Reform Act 2005. She served as Deputy President of the Supreme Court from 2013 to 2017.

Lady Hale became a non-permanent judge of the Court of Final Appeal of Hong Kong in 2018. In June 2021, she announced her decision not to seek reappointment on the Hong Kong court after the end of her term in July, mentioning the impact of the controversial Hong Kong national security law.

In 2019, Lady Hale was appointed an Honorary Professor of Law at University College London. Hale has also been Honorary President of the Cambridge University Law Society since 2015.

On 11 January 2020, Lady Hale was succeeded by Lord Reed of Allermuir as President of the Supreme Court. In 2021, Hale became an honorary fellow of Mansfield College, Oxford.

In 2022, Lady Hale was awarded an Honorary Doctorate of Law by the University of Chichester.

== Early life ==
Brenda Marjorie Hale was born on 31 January 1945 in Leeds, West Riding of Yorkshire. Both her parents were headteachers. She has two sisters. Hale lived in Redcar until the age of three when she moved with her parents to Richmond, North Yorkshire. She was educated at the Richmond High School for Girls (now part of Richmond School), where she and her two sisters were all head girls. She later studied at Girton College, Cambridge (the first from her school to attend Cambridge), where she read law. Hale was one of six women in her class, which had 110 men, and graduated with a starred first and top of her class in 1966.

After becoming an assistant law lecturer at the Victoria University of Manchester (now the University of Manchester) in 1966 and lecturer in 1968, she was called to the Bar by Gray's Inn in 1969, topping the list in the bar finals for that year.

Working part-time as a barrister, Hale spent 18 years mostly in academia, becoming Reader in 1981 and Professor of Law at Manchester in 1986. Two years earlier, she became the first woman and youngest person to be appointed to the Law Commission, overseeing a number of important reforms in family law during her nine years with the commission. In 1989, she was appointed Queen's Counsel.

== Judicial career ==
Lady Hale was appointed a recorder (a part-time circuit judge) in 1989, and in 1994 became a judge in the Family Division of the High Court of Justice (styled The Honourable Mrs Justice Hale). Upon her appointment, as is convention, she was appointed a Dame Commander of the Order of the British Empire (DBE). In 1999, Lady Hale followed Dame Elizabeth Butler-Sloss to become only the second woman to be appointed to the Court of Appeal (styled thereafter The Right Honourable Lady Justice Hale), entering the Privy Council at the same time.

On 12 January 2004, she was appointed the first female Lord of Appeal in Ordinary and was created a life peer as Baroness Hale of Richmond, of Easby in the County of North Yorkshire. She sat in the House of Lords as a Crossbencher.

In June 2013, she was appointed Deputy President of the Supreme Court of the United Kingdom to succeed Lord Hope of Craighead. In July 2017, she was appointed to be the next President of the Supreme Court, succeeding Lord Neuberger of Abbotsbury. She took office in September 2017.

In December 2018, during an interview to mark the centenary of the Sex Disqualification (Removal) Act 1919, Lady Hale argued that the judiciary needed to become more diverse so that the public have greater confidence in judges. Hale called for a more balanced gender representation on the UK's highest court and swifter progress promoting those from minority ethnic backgrounds and with "less privileged lives". However, Lady Hale objected to the idea of positive discrimination because "no one wants to feel they have got the job in any way other than on their own merits".

In September 2019, Prime Minister Boris Johnson prorogued Parliament over Brexit. As President of the Supreme Court of the United Kingdom, Lady Hale along with ten other Justices of the Supreme Court sitting as an enlarged panel, unanimously found that Johnson's prorogation was unlawful, terminating the suspension of Parliament. Hale described the ruling as "a source of, not pride, but satisfaction." In 2020, reaching the mandatory retirement age, Lady Hale retired from the court.

=== Jurisprudence and significant judgments ===
Lord Kerr described one of the core features of Lady Hale's judicial reasoning as "her determination to scrutinise the impact which the law has on the most vulnerable". Kerr cites a number of decisions made by the court with a focus on family law and the rights of women including In re McLaughlin, the judicial review brought by the Northern Ireland Human Rights Commission concerning access to abortion, and McFarlane v Tayside Health Board. Lady Hale is a self-described feminist who was 'by far the most active' Supreme Court judge in using feminist reasoning in her judgements. Numerous of her judgements have been described as 'feminist'.

Her 2010 judgment in Yemshaw v London Borough of Hounslow—where the court expounded a broad understanding of the word "violence" as used in the Housing Act 1996 that covered emotional abuse as well as physical assault—was subject to academic criticism for going beyond the Parliamentary intention, but also cited as an example of judicial sensitivity and foresight around the emergence of coercive control as a legally recognised category of domestic abuse.

=== Hong Kong judgeship ===
On 21 March 2018, the Hong Kong judiciary announced her nomination as a non-permanent judge from other common law jurisdictions of the Court of Final Appeal. Her appointment was accompanied by the appointments of Andrew Cheung and Beverley McLachlin. The appointment was gazetted by the Chief Executive of Hong Kong Carrie Lam and took effect 30 July 2018 for a three-year term.

In October 2020, after China imposing a controversial national security law on Hong Kong, Lady Hale expressed her concerns about hearing cases in Hong Kong: "I have never sat and it has not been arranged at least for me to sit . . . when that happened I would have a serious moral question to ask myself."

In June 2021, she revealed her wish of not wanting to be reappointed as a judge in Hong Kong after her three-year term ending in July. As she was making her decision known before a webinar, she also mentioned the impact of the security law and said, 'The jury is out on how they will be able to operate the new national security law. There are all sorts of question marks up in the air.' However, the Hong Kong Judiciary claimed that her leaving was for personal reasons.

Lady Hale became the first senior British judge to quit Hong Kong's top court after her fellow judge, Australian James Spigelman, resigned as a Hong Kong judge in November 2020.

== House of Lords ==
Lady Hale became a member of the House of Lords following her appointment as a law lord, and was introduced to the Lords on 12 January 2004.

In September 2023, Lady Hale was identified by The Guardian as one of eleven peers who had not sworn or affirmed the oath of allegiance to King Charles III and could not sit or vote in the House of Lords until they had done so. Describing her appointment as a law lord, Hale stated: "I do not accept that I have neglected any 'duties' because I was not appointed as a parliamentarian", and planned to "play a modest part" in the Lords, having retired from judicial office. She made her maiden speech on 23 November 2023, citing "the disruption caused by Covid and [her] own diffidence about whether [she] could make a useful contribution" for not having participated in parliamentary debates since her retirement as a judge.

== Significant lectures ==
On 27 June 2011, Lady Hale gave a lecture in memory of Sir Henry Hodge, "Equal Access to Justice in the Big Society" in which she explains the benefits of an inquisitorial Tribunal system over adversarial proceedings.

On 14 November 2020 Lady Hale gave The McCurdy Lecture, to the Manchester Literary & Philosophical Society on the subject of the Supreme Court in the UK Constitution.

On 10 September 2015, Lady Hale delivered the Caldwell Public Lecture at the University of Melbourne, Australia, on the topic "Protecting Human Rights in the UK Courts: What are we doing wrong?".

On 2 November 2018, Lady Hale delivered an SLS Centenary Lecture at the University of Essex, United Kingdom, on the topic of "All Human Beings? Reflection on the 70th Anniversary of the Universal Declaration of Human Rights".

On 7 March 2019, Lady Hale delivered the University of Cambridge Freshfields law lecture, which she entitled "Principle and Pragmatism in Developing Private Law".

In a 2019 Girton College lecture entitled "100 Years of Women in Law", Lady Hale described the "Brenda Agenda" as "quite simply, the belief that women are equal to men and should enjoy the same rights and freedoms that they do; but that women's lives are necessarily sometimes different from men's and the experience of leading those lives is just as valid and important in shaping the law as is the experience of men's lives."

In June 2024, Lady Hale lectured a large audience at Conway Hall organised by Humanists UK and My Death, My Decision, in which she referred to the law preventing medically assisted euthanasia (assisted dying) as "cruel". This was her first public intervention on the subject since she gave a dissenting opinion in support of the claimant in R (Nicklinson) v Ministry of Justice a decade previously.

== Honours ==
- She was appointed as a Queen's Counsel (QC) in 1989.
- She was made a Dame Commander of the Order of the British Empire (DBE) in the Civil Division in 1994 upon her appointment as a High Court Justice
- She was sworn of Her Majesty's Most Honourable Privy Council in 1999, giving her the honorific style of "The Right Honourable" for life.
- The Law Building at the University of Salford was named after her in 2008.
- She received an Honorary Fellowship from Bristol University in July 2017. An Honorary Fellowship is the highest honour the university can bestow.
- In 2021 "Lady Hale Gate", a passage leading from Chancery Lane into Gray's Inn, was named in her honour. It is home to Gatehouse Chambers.
- She received the Hibernian Law Medal from the Law Society of Ireland on 12 May 2022 for outstanding contributions to the advancement of justice, integrity of the rule of law, independence of the judiciary and the legal professions, and/or public access to and understanding of the legal system.
- Her name is one of those featured on the sculpture Ribbons, unveiled in 2024.

=== Commonwealth honours ===
Country	Date	Appointment	Post-nominal letters
United Kingdom	1989 – Present	Queen's Counsel (1989 – 8 September 2022) / King's Counsel (since 8 September 2022)	QC / KC
United Kingdom	1994 – Present	Dame Commander of the Order of the British Empire	DBE
United Kingdom	1999 – Present	Member of Her Majesty's Most Honourable Privy Council (1999 – 8 September 2022) / Member of His Majesty's Most Honourable Privy Council (since 8 September 2022)	PC

=== Scholastic ===
University degrees

Location	Date	School	Degree
England	1966	Girton College, Cambridge	Starred First Bachelor of Arts
England	1969	Gray's Inn	Called to the bar

Chancellor, visitor, governor, rector and fellowships

Location	Date	School	Position
England	2004–present	Girton College, Cambridge	Visitor
England	2004 – 2016	University of Bristol	Chancellor
England	2015 – present	Law Society of the University of Cambridge	Honorary President
England	July 2017 – present	University of Bristol	Honorary Fellowship
England	17 December 2019 – present	University College London	Honorary Law Professor
England	2020 – present	Lady Margaret Hall, Oxford	Visiting Fellow

Honorary degrees

Location	Date	School	Degree
England	2005	University of Cambridge	Doctorate
England	2006	University of Hull	Doctor of Laws (LLD)
England	July 2007	University of Reading	Doctor of Laws (LLD)
England	27 February 2009	University of the West of England	Doctor of Laws (LLD)
England	2009	University of Huddersfield	DCL
England	July 2010	University of Salford	Doctorate
Scotland	June 2011	University of Glasgow	Doctor of Laws (LLD)
England	July 2011	University of Kent	Doctor of Laws (LLD)
England	2016	University of Worcester	Doctorate
England	2018	York St John University	Doctor of Laws (LLD)
England	26 July 2019	Edge Hill University	Doctor of Laws (LLD)
England	2019	University of Bradford	Doctor of Laws (LLD)
England		London School of Economics	Doctor of Laws (LLD)
France	15 March 2024	Jean Monnet University	Doctorat Honoris Causa (DHC)

=== Memberships and Fellowships ===
Location	Date	Organisation	Position
United Kingdom	2004 – Present	British Academy	Fellow (FBA)
United Kingdom	2017	Gray's Inn	Treasurer

== Personal life ==
In 1968, Lady Hale married John Hoggett, a fellow law lecturer at Manchester, with whom she had one daughter, Julia Hoggett, who was appointed Chief Executive Officer of the London Stock Exchange in April 2021. The marriage was dissolved in 1992. In the same year, she married Julian Farrand, former dean of the law faculty at Manchester, and subsequently Pensions Ombudsman.

In April 2018, Lady Hale featured as a celebrity judge on BBC cooking show MasterChef.

In September 2021, Lady Hale appeared on BBC Radio 4's Desert Island Discs. In the following month she unveiled a blue plaque in honour of Helena Normanton on 22 Mecklenburgh Square in London, saying: "Helena Normanton was the pioneer of female barristers. She had to overcome a great deal of prejudice and discrimination. A blue plaque is a fitting tribute to her courage and her example to women barristers everywhere."

== Bibliography ==
- Parents and Children (1977, 2nd ed. 1981, Sweet and Maxwell) ISBN 9780421279100
- Women and the Law (as Brenda Hoggett, with Susan Atkins, 1984, republished 2018, Institute of Advanced Legal studies, University of London) ISBN 9781911507109
- The Family, Law & Society (with David Pearl, Elizabeth Cooke, Daniel Monk, 2009, Oxford University Press) ISBN 9780199204243
- Mental Health Law (2017, with Penelope Gorman, Rachel Barrett and Jessica Jones, Sweet & Maxwell) ISBN 9780414051201
- Spider Woman: A Life (2021, as Lady Hale) ISBN 978-1847926593
- With the Law on Our Side: How the Law Works for Everyone and How We Can Make It Work Better (2025, as Lady Hale, The Bodley Head) ISBN 9781847926579

== Arms ==
Coat of arms of Brenda Hale, Baroness Hale of Richmond
Notes Granted by Garter Gwynn-Jones, 16 June 2004 Escutcheon Gules two scrolls in saltire Argent banded crosswise Vert attached thereto four seals in cross Or all between four towers crenellations outwards Argent. Supporters Two frogs Vert crowned Or. Motto Omnia Feminae Aequissimae (translated by Debrett's in 2007 as "Everything To The Most Just Woman", but widely discussed in media in 2019 as "Women Are Equal To Everything") Symbolism The castles represent Richmond while the scrolls represent the law. The crowned frog supporters represent the frog prince. For Hale, the frog prince relates to her husband and her large collection of ceramic frogs. ("It's an inside joke between us. My husband was my frog prince. Now people give us frogs.")

== Notes ==
Legal offices
Preceded by The Lord Millett	Lord of Appeal in Ordinary; 2004–2009	Abolished
New office	Justice of the Supreme Court; 2009–2013	Succeeded by Lord Hodge
Preceded by The Lord Hope of Craighead	Deputy President of the Supreme Court; 2013–2017	Succeeded by The Lord Mance
Preceded by The Lord Neuberger of Abbotsbury	President of the Supreme Court; 2017–2020	Succeeded by The Lord Reed of Allermuir
Preceded by None	Non-Permanent Judge of the Court of Final Appeal of Hong Kong; 2018–2021	Succeeded by None
Academic offices
Preceded by Queen Elizabeth the Queen Mother	Visitor of Girton College, Cambridge; 2004–present	Incumbent
Preceded by Sir Jeremy Morse	Chancellor of the University of Bristol; 2004–2016	Succeeded by Sir Paul Nurse
