= Anders Åslund =

Swedish economist (born 1952)

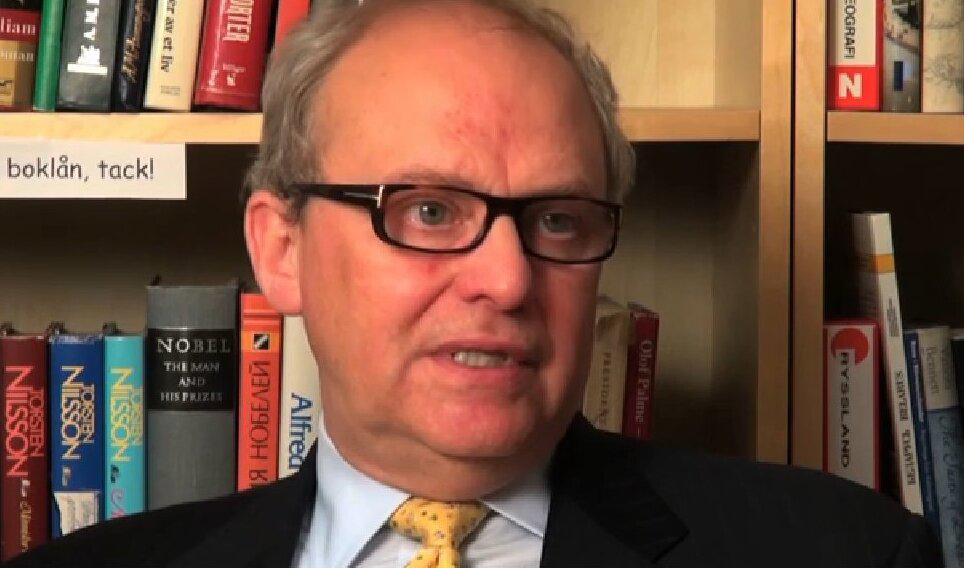
- Åslund in March 2013
- Born: 17 February 1952 (age 74); Karlskoga, Sweden

Academic background
- Education: Oxford University (D.Phil.)

Academic work
- Discipline: Economics of Transition
- Website: Information at IDEAS / RePEc

Per Anders Åslund (Swedish pronunciation: [ˈândɛʂ ˈoːslɵnd]; born 17 February 1952) is a Swedish economist and former Senior Fellow at the Atlantic Council. He is also a chairman of the International Advisory Council at the Center for Social and Economic Research (CASE).

His work focuses on economic transition from centrally planned to market economies. Åslund served as an economic adviser to the governments of Kyrgyzstan, Russia, and Ukraine and from 2003 was director of the Russian and Eurasian Program at the Carnegie Endowment for International Peace. Åslund was an advocate of early, comprehensive, and radical economic reforms in Russia and Eastern Europe. He worked at the Peterson Institute for International Economics from 2006 to 2015. In 2013, neoconservative David Frum wrote that "Anders Aslund at the Peterson Institute is one of the world's leading experts on the collapse of the planned Soviet economy." From 2010 to 2013 and again in 2022 he contributed to The Moscow Times, an independent English-language newspaper; he is also a long-time contributor to the Kyiv Post.

Anders Åslund lives in Washington, DC, with his wife, Anna, and their two children.

== Åslund in Sweden ==
From 1989 to 1994, Åslund worked as a professor of International Economics at the Stockholm School of Economics; and in 1989 he became the founding director of the Stockholm Institute of East European Economics.

On 22 April 1990 Åslund published a controversial article on Dagens Nyheter, drawing parallels between the collapsing communist regimes in Eastern Europe and the social democratic policies in Sweden. He argued that Sweden had too large a public sector; supported communist dictatorships, such as Cuba, in the Third World; and had excessive state intervention in all areas of life. The ruling Swedish Social Democratic Party opposed the views of Åslund in dozens of articles. In June 1990, Social Democratic Prime Minister Ingvar Carlsson voiced public disagreement with Åslund in the Riksdag. However, opposition leader Carl Bildt (Moderate Party) defended Åslund.

== Involvement in Russian economic reform ==
From November 1991 to January 1994, Åslund worked with Jeffrey Sachs and David Lipton as a senior advisor to the Russian reform government under President Boris Yeltsin and Acting Prime Minister Yegor Gaidar. He worked also with Deputy Prime Ministers Anatoly Chubais and Boris Fedorov. Åslund summarized his views in his book How Russia Became a Market Economy.

== Other work ==
After his experiences in Russia, Åslund worked as an economic advisor to President Leonid Kuchma of Ukraine from 1994 to 1997, and from 1998 to 2004, to President Askar Akayev of Kyrgyzstan. Åslund has also worked substantially with economic policy in the Baltic countries, first as a member of the International Baltic Economic Commission from 1991 to 1993, and later as an informal advisor to Latvian Prime Minister Valdis Dombrovskis from 2009. (Dombrovskis was prime minister until 2014.)

== Work in Ukraine ==
In 2016, Åslund was appointed to the supervisory board of Ukraine's 23rd largest bank, Kredyt Dnipro, owned by Ukrainian oligarch Viktor Pinchuk.

From July 2004-January 2005, Åslund co-chaired a Blue Ribbon Commission on a Reform Program for the Next Ukrainian President, sponsored by the United Nations Development Program. From September 2009-February 2010, he co-chaired an Independent Commission of International Experts on Economic Reform for the Ukrainian Government, sponsored by the Swedish and Dutch governments. From May 2014-April 2016, Åslund worked as an Advisor to the Ukrainian Minister of Economy.

From January 2016-August 2020, Åslund was a non-executive director of Bank Credyt Dnipro, Ukraine, and from June 2018-September 2020, he was a non-executive director of Ukrzaliznytsia (the Ukrainian state railways), Ukraine. He resigned in September 2020, complaining that "I feel neither wanted by the shareholder nor offered viable working conditions, while the legal liability is mine."

== Books ==
- Gorbachev's Struggle for Economic Reform, Cornell University Press, 1989
- Market Socialism or the Restoration of Capitalism?, Cambridge University Press, 1991
- Post-communist Economic Revolutions: How Big A Bang?, Routledge, 1992
- The Post-Soviet Economy: Soviet and Western Perspectives, Palgrave MacMillan, 1992
- Changing the Eco System, Pinter Publishers, 1994
- Economic Transformation in Russia, St. Martin's Press, 1994
- How Russia Became a Market Economy, Brookings Institution Press, 1995
- Russian Economic Reform at Risk, Pinter Publishers, 1995
- Russia's Economic Transformation in the 1990s, Pinter Publishers, 1998
- Russia After Communism, Carnegie Endowment for International Peace, 1999
- Economic Reform in Ukraine: The Unfinished Agenda, Routledge, 2000
- Revolution in Orange: The Origins of Ukraine's Democratic Breakthrough, Carnegie Endowment for International Peace, 2006
- Russia's Capitalist Revolution: Why Market Reform Succeeded and Democracy Failed, Peterson Institute for International Economics, 2007
- Europe After Enlargement, Cambridge University Press, 2007
- Building Capitalism: The Transformation of the Former Soviet Bloc, Cambridge University Press, 2008
- The Challenges of Globalization: Imbalances and Growth, Peterson Institute for International Economics, 2008
- How Ukraine Became a Market Economy and Democracy, Peterson Institute for International Economics, 2009
- (with Andrew Kuchins) The Russia Balance Sheet, Peterson Institute for International Economics, 2009
- Russia After the Global Economic Crisis, Peterson Institute for International Economics, 2010
- The Last Shall Be the First: East European Financial Crisis, 2008–10, Peterson Institute for International Economics, 2010
- (with Valdis Dombrovskis) How Latvia Came Through the Financial Crisis, Peterson Institute for International Economics, 2011
- (with Gary Clyde Hufbauer) The United States Should Establish Permanent Normal Trade Relations with Russia, Peterson Institute for International Economics, 2012
- How Capitalism Was Built: The Transformation of Central and Eastern Europe, Russia, the Caucasus, and Central Asia, Cambridge University Press, 2013
- (with Simeon Dyankov)The Great Rebirth: Lessons from the Victory of Capitalism over Communism, Peterson Institute for International Economics, 2014
- Ukraine: What Went Wrong and How to Fix It, Peterson Institute for International Economics, 2015
- (with Simeon Dyankov) Europe's Growth Challenge, Oxford University Press, 2017
- Putin's Economic Policy and Its Consequences, Oxford University Press, 2019
- Russia's Crony Capitalism: The Path from Market Economy to Kleptocracy, Yale University Press, 2019

== Bibliography ==
Authored Books

- Private Enterprise in Eastern Europe. The Non-Agricultural Private Sector in Poland and the GDR, 1945–83 Macmillan, London, 1985, 294 pp.
- Gorbachev's Struggle for Economic Reform, Pinter, London, and Cornell University Press, Ithaca, 1989, 219 pp. 2nd ed., Pinter, London, and Cornell University Press, Ithaca, 1991, 262 pp.
- Post-Communist Economic Revolutions: How Big a Bang? The Center for Strategic and International Studies, Washington, DC, and Westview, 1992, 106 pp.
- How Russia Became a Market Economy, 1995, ISBN 978-0-8157-0425-6
- Getting It Wrong: Regional Cooperation and the Commonwealth of Independent States, Carnegie Endowment for International Peace, Washington, D.C., 1999., with Martha Brill Olcott and Sherman W. Garnett,
- Building Capitalism: The Transformation of the Former Soviet Bloc, 2001, ISBN 978-0-521-80525-4
- How Capitalism Was Built: The Transformation of Central and Eastern Europe, Russia, and Central Asia, New York: Cambridge University Press, 2007.
- Russia's Capitalist Revolution: Why Market Reform Succeeded and Democracy Failed, 2007, ISBN 978-0-88132-409-9
- How Ukraine Became a Market Economy and Democracy, 2009, ISBN 0-88132-427-2
- The Russia Balance Sheet, 2009 by Anders Åslund and Andrew Kuchins, ISBN 978-0-88132-424-2
- The Last Shall Be the first: The East European Financial Crisis, 2008–10, 2010, ISBN 978-0-88132-521-8
- How Latvia Came through the Financial Crisis, 2011, by Anders Åslund and Valdis Dombrovskis, ISBN 978-0-88132-602-4
- Ukraine: What Went Wrong and How to Fix It, 2015, ISBN 978-0-88132-701-4
- Russia's Crony Capitalism: The Path from Market Economy to Kleptocracy, 2019, ISBN 978-0-30024-309-3

Edited Books

- Market Socialism or the Restoration of Capitalism?, 1992, ISBN 978-0-52141-193-6
- The Post-Soviet Economy: Soviet and Western Perspectives, 1992, ISBN 978-0-31207-569-9
- Changing the Economic System in Russia, 1993, by Anders Åslund and Richard Layard, ISBN 1-85567-129-8
- Economic Transformation in Russia, 1994, ISBN 978-0-31212-044-3
- Russian Economic Reform at Risk, 1995, ISBN 978-1-85567-286-4
- Sotsialnaya politika v period perekhoda k rynku: problemy i resheniya (Social Policy in the Transition to a Market Economy: Problems and Solutions), 1996 by Anders Åslund and Mikhail Dmitriev, ISBN 978-0-87003-121-2
- Russia's Economic Transformation in the 1990s, 1997, ISBN 978-1-85567-461-5
- Russia After Communism, 1999 by Anders Åslund and Martha Brill Olcott, ISBN 978-0-87003-151-9
- Economic Reform in Ukraine: The Unfinished Agenda, 2000 by Anders Åslund and Georges de Ménil, ISBN 978-0-76560-624-2
- Ocherki o mirovoi ekonomike. Vydayushchiesya ekonomisty mira v Moskovskom Tsentre Carnegie. (Series of Lectures on Economics: Leading World Experts at the Carnegie Moscow Center), 2005 by Anders Åslund and Tatyana Maleva
- Russia Versus the United States and Europe – or "Strategic Triangle"?, 2005 by Anders Åslund and Hannes Adomeit
- Revolution in Orange: The Origins of Ukraine's Democratic Breakthrough, 2006 by Anders Åslund and Michael McFaul, ISBN 978-0-87003-221-9
- The Challenges of Globalization, 2008 by Anders Åslund and Marek Dabrowski, ISBN 978-0-88132-418-1
- Russia After the Global Economic Crisis, 2010 by Anders Åslund, Sergey Guriyev, and Andrew Kuchins, ISBN 978-0-88132-497-6
- Europe After Enlargement, 2012 by Anders Åslund and Marek Dabrowski, ISBN 978-1-10741-051-0
- The Great Rebirth: Lessons from the Victory of Capitalism over Communism, 2014 by Anders Åslund and Simeon Djankov, ISBN 978-0-88132-697-0
- Europe's Growth Challenge, 2017 by Anders Åslund and Simeon Djankov, ISBN 978-0-19049-920-4
