= David Pearl (lawyer) =

David Stephen Pearl (born 11 August 1944) is a British lawyer.

Pearl was educated at the University of Birmingham (LLB) and at Queens' College, Cambridge (LLM, MA, PhD) prior to being called to the Bar at Gray's Inn in 1968. He is Bencher of Gray’s Inn. He then lectured in law at the University of Cambridge, where he was a fellow of Fitzwilliam College and wrote the first comprehensive textbook of Muslim law for British students. He later served as dean of law at the University of East Anglia. He was a appointed a Circuit Judge in 1994. He became the chief adjudicator of immigration appeals in 1994, and then president of the Immigration Appeal Tribunal in 1997. He was director of studies at the Judicial Studies Board (1999–2002) and was president of the Care Standards Tribunal from 2002 to 2007. Pearl was appointed as a member of the Judicial Appointments Commission from January 2006 to 2012 representing tribunals. He was a Deputy High Court Judge from 2008-2012. He was appointed as the National Chairman of the Medical Practitioners Tribunal Service from February 2012 to December 2016. He was the Reviewer commissioned by the Archbishops’ Council to write an independent report into the handling of allegations that came to the attention of the Church of England concerning the late Bishop of Chester published as ‘A Betrayal of Trust’ (2021).

== Selected bibliography ==
- A Textbook on Muslim Law, Croom Helm 1979. ISBN 978-0856649592
- Family, Law and Society: Cases and Materials, Butterworths 1991 (with Brenda M. Hoggett). ISBN 978-0406608703 6th edition Oxford University Press 2009 with Baroness Hale of Richmond, Professor Elizabeth Cooke and Mr Daniel Monk.
- Muslim Family Law, Sweet & Maxwell 1998 (with Werner Menski). ISBN 978-0421529809
- Butterworths Handbook on Immigration Law, Butterworths 1999 (with Eugene Cotran, Julia Onslow-Cole). ISBN 978-0406981295
