= Julia Hoggett =

British banker (born 1973)

The Honourable Dame Julia Hoggett DBE
- Born: 19 September 1973 (age 52)
- Education: Newnham College, Cambridge
- Occupations: Banker, risk manager
- Employer: London Stock Exchange
- Parent: Brenda Hale, Baroness Hale of Richmond

Dame Julia Anne Hoggett DBE (born 19 September 1973) is a British banker and risk manager, who was appointed Chief Executive Officer of London Stock Exchange plc (LSE) in April 2021. She was appointed a Dame Commander of the Order of the British Empire (DBE) in the June 2024 Birthday Honours for services to finance and business. In November 2023 she was awarded the Freedom of the City of London. In 2024 she was listed by the Financial Times as one of its 25 most influential women of the year.

== Biography ==
Born on 19 September 1973, Hoggett's parents are Brenda Hale, Baroness Hale of Richmond and John Hoggett QC. She was educated at Manchester High School for Girls and St Paul's Girls' School. She has a degree in Social and Political Sciences from Newnham College, Cambridge.

Her career began at JP Morgan in the late 1990s working on bond issues. In 2004, she moved to Dublin to work for Depfa Bank. She was later a managing director at Bank of America Merrill Lynch after moving back to London. She joined the Financial Conduct Authority in 2014, and worked there as Director of Market Oversight. During her tenure there, she described insider dealing as "the poster child of market abuse", but warned that market manipulation needed further scrutiny. She has described her career as that of a risk manager, across a range of roles.

Hoggett was appointed Chief Executive Officer of London Stock Exchange plc (LSE) in April 2021. There she has argued for higher executive pay, as part of measures to attract and retain companies in the UK financial markets. She has also spoken out on how the standing of UK financial markets has been negatively impacted by increases in "corporate governance processes". She has been a spokesperson for diversity and inclusion for over twenty years, after coming out as gay in a professional setting early in her career at JP Morgan. She has also spoken on how being openly gay at work led to easier relationships with some male colleagues, which could be "business-like from the start".

Hoggett lives in London with her partner Wendy. She has two children with her former partner.

== Awards and recognition ==
Hoggett was appointed a Dame Commander of the Order of the British Empire (DBE) in the June 2024 Birthday Honours for services to finance and business. In 2024 she was listed by the Financial Times as one of its 25 most influential women of the year. In November 2023 she was awarded the Freedom of the City of London for her service to the UK financial services industry and for supporting the contributions of women in the City of London. In 2023 City AM awarded her Industry Leader of the Year. She has featured in the Financial News's 100 Influential Women six times.
