= Susan Atkins (civil servant) =

British civil servant (born 1952)

Susan Ruth Elizabeth Atkins CB (née Prickett; born 4 March 1952) is a British civil servant.

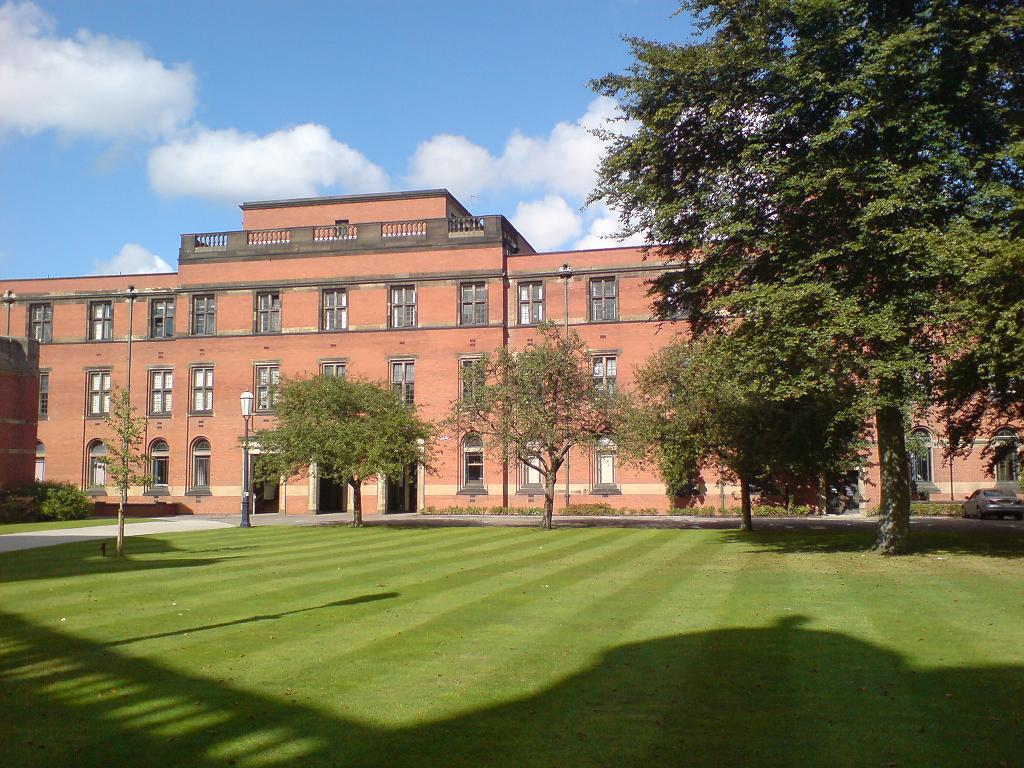
Birmingham University

Susan Atkins graduated from Birmingham University with an LLB in Law in 1973. Atkins trained as a solicitor in local government. She was a law academic for 12 years, specialising in anti-discrimination law, and co-wrote Women and the Law with Brenda Hoggett (now Lady Hale of Richmond). She joined the civil service in 1989.

Atkins was appointed in 2007 to be the first independent Service Complaints Commissioner for the Armed Forces. Atkins is also a non-executive director of the Quality Assurance Agency and of the Leadership Foundation for Higher Education.

Susan Atkins was appointed the first Chief Executive of the Independent Police Complaints Commission in 2003. Her previous posts include Deputy Chief Executive of the Equal Opportunities Commission, Departmental Equal Opportunities Officer for the Home Office and director of the Women and Equality Unit in the Cabinet Office. She has also been a visiting professor at Southampton University.

Atkins was appointed a Companion of the Order of the Bath (CB) in the 2014 Birthday Honours for services to Armed Service Personnel.
