= Julian Farrand =

English legal academic and solicitor (1935–2020)

Professor Julian Farrand
- Born: 13 August 1935
- Died: 17 July 2020 (aged 84)
- Occupations: Legal academic and solicitor
- Spouse: Brenda Hale, Baroness Hale of Richmond (1992–2020)
- Children: 3

Julian Thomas Farrand QC (Hon.) (13 August 1935 – 17 July 2020) was an English legal academic and solicitor who specialized in real property.

== Early life and education ==
Farrand was born to J. and E.A. Farrand. He was educated at the Haberdashers' Aske's Boys' School. From there, he went to University College London, completing the LLB in 1957 and later the LLD in 1966. He was admitted as a solicitor in 1960.

== Career ==
He began his academic career as an assistant lecturer, then lecturer, at KCL in 1960. He followed this with lectureships at Sheffield University and Queen Mary. He became Professor of Law at the University of Manchester in 1968 and Dean of the Faculty of Law 1970–72 and 1976–78. He remained professor at Manchester until 1988. He served as Law Commissioner, leading a team on real property reform, between 1984 and 1989.

He was made QC (honoris causa) in 1994. He was the first Insurance Ombudsman in 1989 and later Pensions Ombudsman in 1994. Until 2011, he was Chairman of the Residential Property Tribunals.

== Personal life ==
He married Brenda Hale in 1992. He had one son and two daughters from a previous marriage. He was also a keen chess player.
