= Stijn Claessens =

Dutch economist (born 1959)

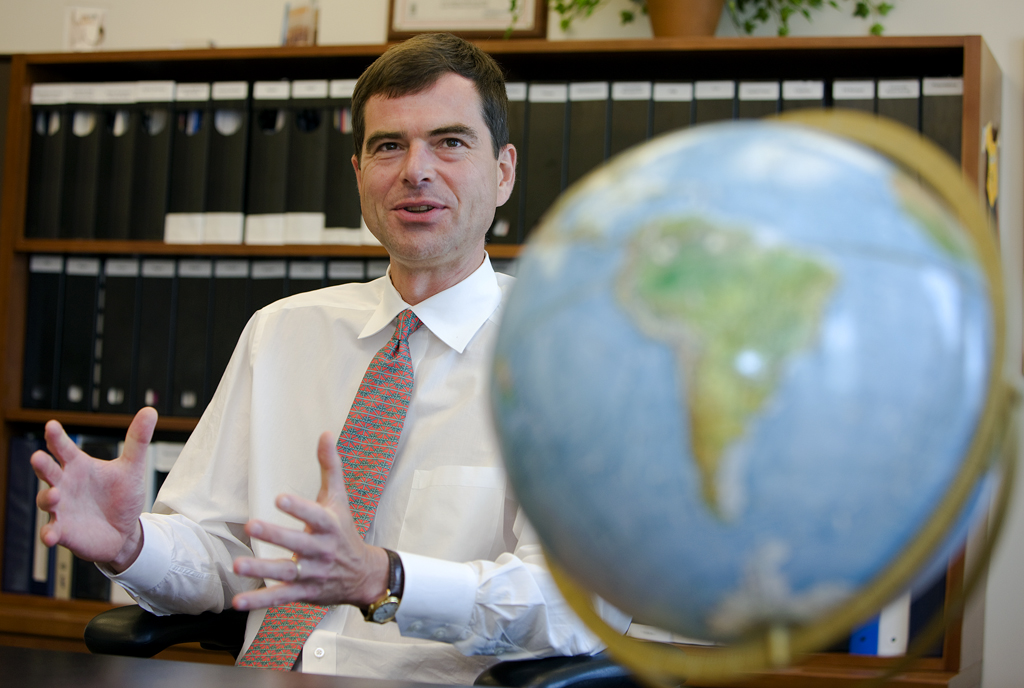
- Born: June 19, 1959 (age 67)

Academic background
- Education: Erasmus University; The Wharton School

Academic work
- Discipline: Financial economics
- Institutions: International Monetary Fund
- Website: Information at IDEAS / RePEc

Stijn Claessens (born Constantijn Anton Marie Francois Claessens, June 19, 1959) is a Dutch economist who currently serves as the Head of Financial Stability Policy department of the Bank for International Settlements. He worked for fourteen years at World Bank beginning in 1987 until 2001 where he assumed various positions including that of Lead Economist. Following his tenure at the World Bank he became Professor of International Finance Policy at the University of Amsterdam where he remained for three years and still is on the faculty. Stijn has many distinguished academic publications and his work has been cited in many outlets including The Wall Street Journal, The Financial Times, The Economist, The Washington Post and various other publications and he has appeared in several television programs.

== Early life ==
Claessens was born in Udenhout, the Netherlands on June 19, 1959. Claessens attended Erasmus University in Rotterdam where, in May 1979, he received his bachelor's in Business Economics, and later, in 1981, his Bachelor of Laws. He then went on to receive his doctorate in Business Economics in 1984 and applied for further education at The Wharton School at the University of Pennsylvania.

== Academic career ==
During his time at Wharton he was a Research Fellow and taught International Financial Management, Micro-economic Theory & Monetary Economics to aspiring MBA students. In the Spring of 1987 he taught at New York University as a visiting Assistant Professor of International Corporate Finance and International Financial Management. In mid-1987 he joined the World Bank as a Financial Officer, becoming a Lead Economist towards the end of his fourteen-year tenure at the Bank. He moved back to The Netherlands, to join the University of Amsterdam as the Professor of International Finance Policy in 2001 where he taught for three years and is still currently on staff as a professor.

In September 2004 after relocating back to the United States he rejoined the World Bank assuming the position of Senior Adviser to the Vice-President for Financial Setor at the Bank. He left the Bank in January 2007 to join The International Monetary Fund IMF as the Chief of the Financial Studies Division in the Research Department. Currently he is also the assistant director, reporting to Olivier Blanchard. Claessens remains a fellow at the Wharton School and at the London-based CEPR, among other networks.

Stijn Claessens has written extensively on issues in international economics and finance, including on firm finance, corporate governance, internationalization of financial services, risk management, and international finance. He currently works on business and financial cycles.

=== Policy and Operational Work ===
Claessens has worked on various countries, including operational missions to: Argentina, Belarus, Brazil, Bulgaria, China, Chile, Colombia, Costa Rica, Czech Republic, Hungary, India, Indonesia, South Korea, Kyrgyz Republic, Malaysia, Mexico, Nigeria, Papua New Guinea, Poland, the Philippines, Romania, Russia, Slovakia, South Africa, Thailand, and Turkey.

Current research and operational focus: enterprise and financial sector restructuring in transition economies and developing countries; sovereign asset liability management; corporate governance and capital markets development; internationalization of financial services; business and financial cycles.

=== Consultancies ===
Organisation for Economic Co-operation and Development (OECD), Bank for International Settlements (BIS), World Bank, Asian Development Bank (ADB), Asian Development Bank Institute (ADBI), Netherlands Ministry of Foreign Affairs (member Advisory Group Debt Relief Study)

== Author ==
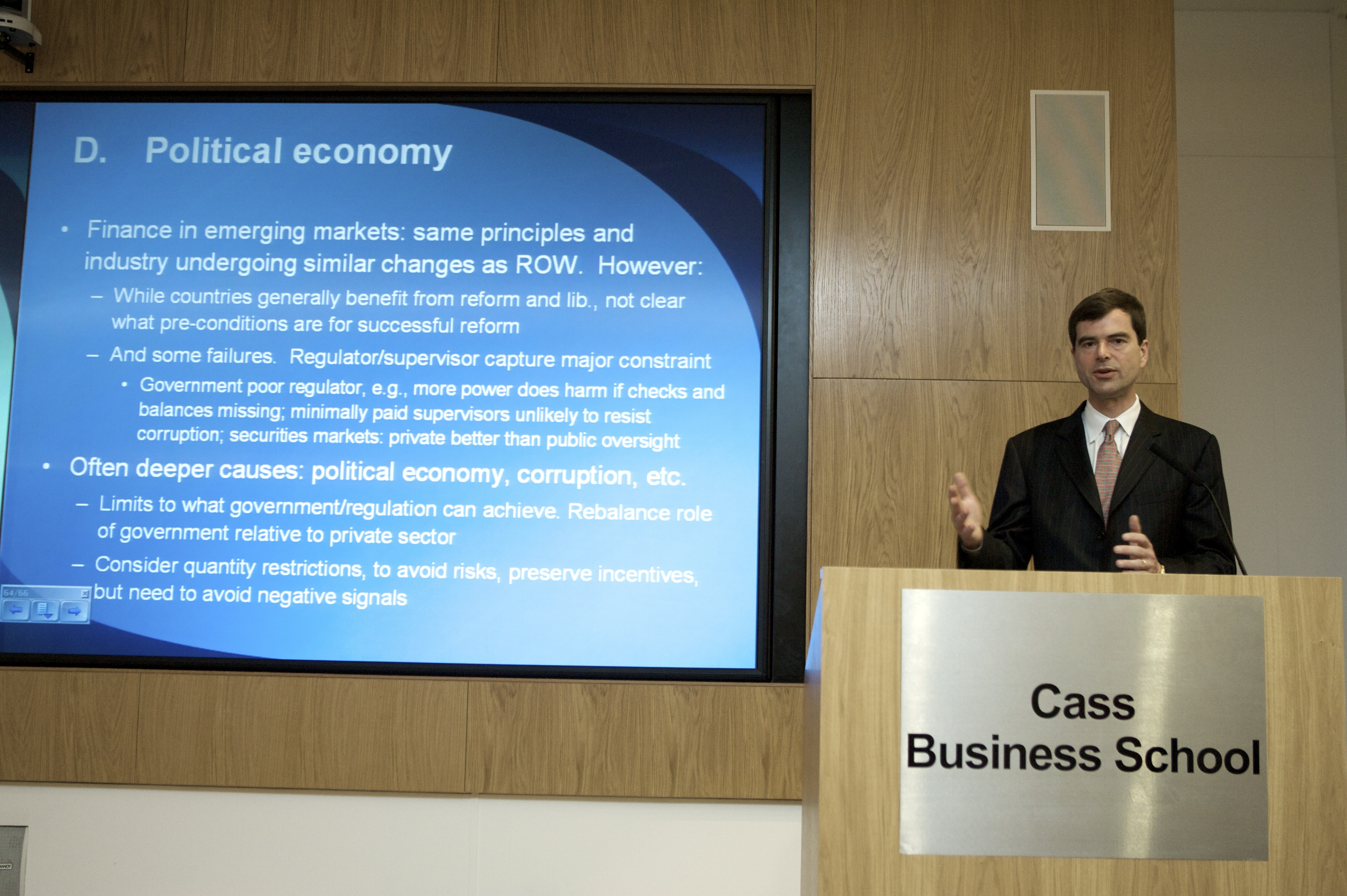
Stijn Claessens speaking at the Cass Business School in London

Claessens has written papers with distinguished economists including Paul Krugman, and his work has been cited by Joseph Stiglitz. His work in the field of corporate governance has been quoted, especially The Separation of Ownership and Control in East Asian Corporations with Djankov, Simeon and Lang, Larry. His published work total over 190 books and papers; many have been cited in works such as Globalization and Its Discontents and Restoring Financial Stability: How to Repair a Failed System.

His research has been published in the Journal of Financial Economics, Journal of Finance and Quarterly Journal of Economics. He has edited several books, including International Financial Contagion (Kluwer 2001) Resolution of Financial Distress (World Bank Institute 2001) and A Reader in International Corporate Finance (World Bank).

== Published works ==
=== Books (authored or coauthored) ===
- Financial Crises: Causes, Consequences, and Policy Responses with M. Ayhan Kose, Luc Laeven, and Fabián Valencia. International Monetary Fund Publications. ISBN 978-1-47554-340-7
- Political Connections and Preferential Access to Finance: The Role of Campaign Contributions with Erik Feijen and Luc Laeven, Journal of Financial Economics, forthcoming.
- International Financial Integration through Equity Markets: Which Firms from Which Countries Go Global? with Sergio L. Schmukler, Journal of International Money and Finance, forthcoming.
- financial sector development and the Millennium Development Goals (February 26, 2007), with Erik Feijen. World Bank Publications, ISBN 0-8213-6864-8
- Resolution of Financial Distress: An International Perspective on the Design of Bankruptcy Laws (June 15, 2001), with Simeon Djankov and Ashoka Mody. World Bank Publications, ISBN 0-8213-4906-6
- A Reader in International Corporate Finance, Volume 1 (August 21, 2006), with Luc Laeven. World Bank Publications, ISBN 0-8213-6698-X
- Are Financial Sector Weaknesses Undermining the East Asian Miracle (June, 1997), with Thomas C. Glaessner. World Bank Publications, ISBN 0-8213-4006-9
- Electronic Finance: A New Approach to Financial Sector Development? (March 1, 2002), with Thomas C. Glaessner and Daniela Klingebiel. World Bank Publications, ISBN 0-8213-5104-4
- International Financial Contagion (May 11, 2001), with Kristin Forbes. Springer, ISBN 0-7923-7285-9
- The Internationalization of Financial Services – Issues and Lessons for Developing Countries (November 2000), with Marion Jansen. Kluwer Law International, ISBN 90-411-9817-2

=== Published ===
- E-Finance in Emerging Markets: Is Leapfrogging Possible?
- Policy Selectivity Foregone: Debt and Donor Behavior in Africa
- Corporate Governance in Asia: A Survey
- The Growing Importance Of Networks in Finance and Its Effects on Competition
- Regulatory Reform and Trade Liberalization in Financial Services
- What Drives Banking Competition?
- Corporate Performance in the East Asian Financial Crisis
- The separation of ownership and control in East Asian Corporations
- Contagion: Understanding How It Spreads
- How does Foreign Entry Affect Domestic Banking Markets?
- Competition and Scope of Activities in Financial Services
- The Political Economy of Distress in East Asian Financial Institutions
- Electronic Finance: Reshaping the Financial Landscape Around the World
- Disentangling the Incentive and the Entrenchment Effects of Large Shareholdings
- Resolution of Corporate Distress in East Asia
- Financial Development, Property Rights, and Growth
- When does Corporate Diversification Matter to Productivity and Performance? Evidence from East Asia
- "Low-For-Long” interest rates and banks’ interest margins and profitability: Cross-country evidence
- Home country interest rates and international investment in US bonds

=== Working papers ===
- Anchors in the Storm: The Role of Bank Capital in Corporate Lending
- Corporate Governance and Enforcement
- Stock Market Development and Internationalization: Do Economic Fundamentals Spur Both Similarly?
- Basle II Capital Requirements and Developing Countries: A Political Economy Perspective
- The Costs and Benefits of Group Affiliation: Evidence from East Asia
- The Pattern and Valuation Effects of Corporate Diversification: A Comparison of the US, Japan, and Other East Asian Economies
- Explaining the Migration of Stocks from Exchanges in Emerging Economies to International Centers
- Government Bonds in Domestic and Foreign Currency: The Role of Macroeconomic and Institutional Factors.
- Bankruptcy around the World: Explanations of its Relative Use
- Basel II, Sovereign Ratings and Transfer Risk. External versus Internal Ratings.
- Competition in the Financial Sector: Overview of Competition Policies Working Paper No. 09/45, March 1, 2009
- What Happens During Recessions, Crunches, and Busts? Working Paper No. 08/274, December 1, 2008
- Banks and Labor as Stakeholders: Impact on Economic Performance Working Paper No. 08/229, September 1, 2008
- Empirical Evidence on the New International Aid Architecture Working Paper No. 07/277, December 1, 2007
- International Financial Integration Through Equity Markets: Which Firms from Which Countries Go Global? Working Paper No. 07/138, June 1, 2007
