= Pushkin Institute of Russian Language =

Education center in Moscow, Russia

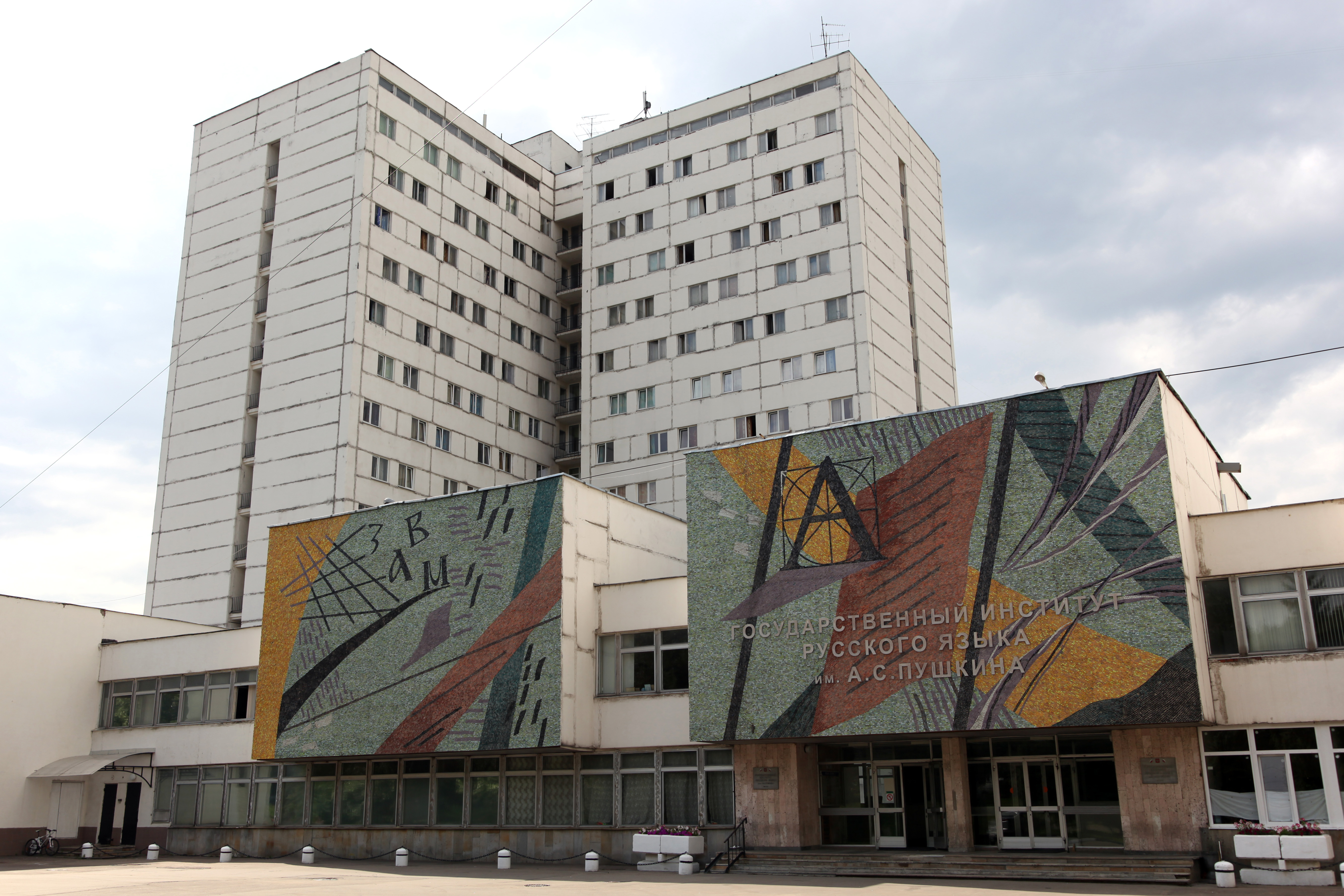
The Pushkin State Russian Language Institute and its dormitory tower

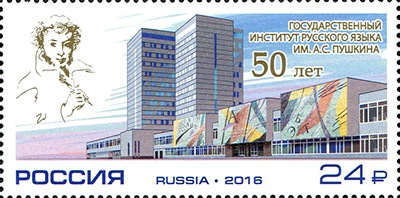
2016 postage stamp of Russia, dedicated to the 50th anniversary of the Pushkin Institute

The Pushkin State Russian Language Institute (Russian: Государственный институт русского языка имени А. С. Пушкина) is a public education centre in Moscow specializing in the teaching of Russian as a foreign language and offering a range of language courses on all levels. It is named after the Russian writer Alexander Pushkin.

The Institute's address is Akademik Volgin Street, 6 (Russian: улица Академика Волгина 6).

The Pushkin Institute is among the institutions recommended by the Russian Embassy in Berlin for Russian language courses.

== History ==
The institute was founded in 1966 as a part of Moscow State University. In 1973, it obtained its independence and in 1999 a Philological Department was established.

== Courses ==
The institute offers one month summer courses and one year or one term courses. Most of the participants are recruited through bilateral exchange programmes dating back to the Soviet era.
