= Human Capital Index =

Annual measurement by the World Bank

The Human Capital Index (HCI) is an annual measurement prepared by the World Bank. HCI measures which countries are best in mobilizing their human capital, the economic and professional potential of their citizens. The index measures how much capital each country loses through lack of education and health. The index ranges between 0 and 1, with 1 meaning maximum potential is reached. HCI is used in country studies of employment and wages, for example in Ukraine after Russia's invasion.

== Methodology ==
The applications to measuring human capital were developed in research by Noam Angrist, Simeon Djankov, Pinelopi Koujianou Goldberg, and Harry Patrinos in the scientific journal Nature. These findings were popularized in a 2021 article. HCI is grounded on the following three pillars:

Survival

- Percentage of children surviving past the age of 5

School

- Quantity of education (Expected years of schooling by age 18)
- Quality of education (Harmonized test scores)

Health

- Adult survival rates (Percentage of 15-year-olds who survive until age 60)
- Healthy growth among children (Stunting rates of children under 5)

== History ==
The Human Capital Index was first published as part of the World Bank's World Development Report 2019, directed by Simeon Djankov and World Bank chief economist Federica Saliola (https://live.worldbank.org/en/experts/f/federica-saliola). Nobel Prize winner Paul Romer started the measurement.

== List of countries by HCI ==
List of countries by Human Capital Index 2020
Rank	Country / Region	Score (% of potential reached)
1	Singapore	0.88
2	Hong Kong	0.81
3	Japan	0.80
4	South Korea	0.80
5	Canada	0.80
6	Finland	0.80
7	Macao	0.80
8	Sweden	0.80
9	Ireland	0.79
10	Netherlands	0.79
11	United Kingdom	0.78
12	Estonia	0.78
13	New Zealand	0.78
14	Slovenia	0.77
15	Norway	0.77
16	Australia	0.77
17	Portugal	0.77
18	France	0.76
19	Belgium	0.76
20	Switzerland	0.76
21	Cyprus	0.76
22	Denmark	0.76
23	Poland	0.75
24	Czech Republic	0.75
25	Germany	0.75
26	Austria	0.75
27	Iceland	0.75
28	Israel	0.73
29	Spain	0.73
30	Italy	0.73
31	Croatia	0.71
32	Malta	0.71
33	Latvia	0.71
34	Lithuania	0.71
35	United States	0.70
36	Belarus	0.70
37	Greece	0.69
38	Vietnam	0.69
39	Luxembourg	0.69
40	Hungary	0.68
41	Russia	0.68
42	Serbia	0.68
43	United Arab Emirates	0.67
44	Slovakia	0.66
45	China	0.65
46	Bahrain	0.65
47	Chile	0.65
48	Turkey	0.65
49	Qatar	0.64
50	Albania	0.63
51	Montenegro	0.63
52	Seychelles	0.63
53	Ukraine	0.63
54	Costa Rica	0.63
55	Kazakhstan	0.63
56	Brunei	0.63
57	Uzbekistan	0.63
58	Mauritius	0.62
59	Mongolia	0.61
60	Bulgaria	0.61
61	Mexico	0.61
62	Malaysia	0.61
63	Thailand	0.61
64	Oman	0.61
65	Peru	0.61
66	Colombia	0.61
67	Trinidad and Tobago	0.60
68	Saint Lucia	0.60
69	Argentina	0.60
70	Uruguay	0.60
71	Sri Lanka	0.60
72	Kyrgyzstan	0.60
73	Antigua and Barbuda	0.60
74	Ecuador	0.59
75	Iran	0.59
76	Palau	0.59
77	Saint Kitts and Nevis	0.59
78	Romania	0.58
79	Moldova	0.58
80	Palestine	0.58
81	Bosnia and Herzegovina	0.58
82	Armenia	0.58
83	Azerbaijan	0.58
84	Saudi Arabia	0.58
85	Georgia	0.57
86	Kosovo	0.57
87	Grenada	0.57
88	Kuwait	0.56
89	North Macedonia	0.56
90	Jordan	0.55
91	Brazil	0.55
92	Samoa	0.55
93	Kenya	0.55
94	El Salvador	0.55
95	Dominica	0.54
96	Indonesia	0.54
97	Jamaica	0.53
98	Algeria	0.53
99	Saint Vincent and the Grenadines	0.53
100	Tonga	0.53
101	Paraguay	0.53
102	Tunisia	0.52
103	Philippines	0.52
104	Lebanon	0.52
105	Fiji	0.51
106	Nauru	0.51
107	Nicaragua	0.51
108	Federated States of Micronesia	0.51
109	Nepal	0.50
110	Morocco	0.50
111	Tajikistan	0.50
112	Dominican Republic	0.50
113	Panama	0.50
114	Guyana	0.50
115	Egypt	0.49
116	India	0.49
117	Kiribati	0.49
118	Cambodia	0.49
119	Honduras	0.48
120	Myanmar	0.48
121	Bhutan	0.48
122	Zimbabwe	0.47
123	Bangladesh	0.46
124	Guatemala	0.46
125	Gabon	0.46
126	Laos	0.46
127	Vanuatu	0.45
128	Timor-Leste	0.45
129	Ghana	0.45
130	Tuvalu	0.45
131	Haiti	0.45
132	Namibia	0.45
133	Togo	0.43
134	Papua New Guinea	0.43
135	South Africa	0.43
136	Marshall Islands	0.42
137	Gambia	0.42
138	Senegal	0.42
139	Solomon Islands	0.42
140	Republic of the Congo	0.42
141	Botswana	0.41
142	Malawi	0.41
143	Iraq	0.41
144	Pakistan	0.41
145	Comoros	0.40
146	Lesotho	0.40
147	Benin	0.40
148	Afghanistan	0.40
149	Cameroon	0.40
150	Zambia	0.40
151	Madagascar	0.39
152	Tanzania	0.39
153	Burundi	0.39
154	Uganda	0.38
155	Burkina Faso	0.38
156	Ethiopia	0.38
157	Mauritania	0.38
158	Ivory Coast	0.38
159	Rwanda	0.38
160	Sudan	0.38
161	Yemen	0.37
162	Eswatini	0.37
163	Guinea	0.37
164	Democratic Republic of the Congo	0.37
165	Sierra Leone	0.36
166	Angola	0.36
167	Mozambique	0.36
168	Nigeria	0.36
169	Liberia	0.32
170	Mali	0.32
171	South Sudan	0.31
172	Chad	0.30
173	Niger	0.29

== See also ==
- Human capital
- World Development Report
