= Human Capital Institute =

Institute for Talent management leadership related to human capital

- Company type: Private company
- Industry: Human capital
- Headquarters: Brooklyn, New York, United States
- Products: HR training, certification, research
- Website: www.hci.org

The Human Capital Institute (HCI) is an American institute for talent management training and education related to human capital (human resources). The institute conducts training, certification, research, education and events. Membership includes corporations, government agencies, global consultants and business schools in the United States. Human capital is one of the three components of intellectual capital and has become a primary focus in the knowledge economy. The institute is a subsidiary of Simplify Compliance.

The institute conducts research and training to determine best practices in regard to workforce planning, recruitment, onboarding and engagement, learning and development, succession and retention and talent management. The association has also conducted research on the importance of human capital in the success of mergers and acquisitions.
