= Vlerick Business School =

Belgian business school

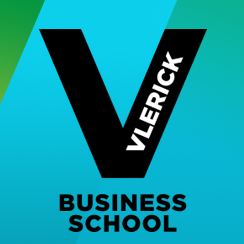
- Former names: Vlerick Leuven Gent Management School
- Type: business school
- Established: 1999
- Dean: Marion Debruyne
- Administrative staff: 300
- Students: 680
- Location: Leuven, Ghent and Brussels (Belgium); 51°03′06″N 3°43′45″E
- Campus: Urban
- Website: www.vlerick.com

Vlerick Business School ("Vlerick") is a Belgian business school with campuses in Ghent, Leuven, and Brussels. It is a result of a merger of MBA programmes of the Katholieke Universiteit Leuven and of the Instituut Professor Vlerick voor Management of Ghent University, in 1999 (which, however, have both started offering MBA programmes again since). It is a higher education institute recognized and subsidized by decree.

== History ==
In 1953, professor, politician, and entrepreneur André Vlerick founded the Centre for Productivity Studies and Research at State University of Ghent, which in 1983 became an autonomous school called the Instituut Professor Vlerick voor Management. In 1968, the Catholic University of Leuven created an international MBA programme, later organised by the Katholieke Universiteit Leuven.

In 1999, the universities merged their MBA programmes, creating a new institution named Vlerick Leuven Gent Management School and established in Leuven and Ghent. In parallel, the UGent and KU Leuven continue to offer graduate courses in management and business administration, including MBA programmes, in their faculties of Management and Business administration. In 2006, Vlerick opened its campus in Saint Petersburg, and in 2013 its Brussels campus, in Saint-Josse-ten-Noode.

In 2012, Vlerick Leuven Gent Management School changed its name and becomes the Vlerick Business School. Vlerick presents itself as being the oldest business school in Europe though in 2018, it is legally speaking the most recent one founded in Belgium.

== Building ==
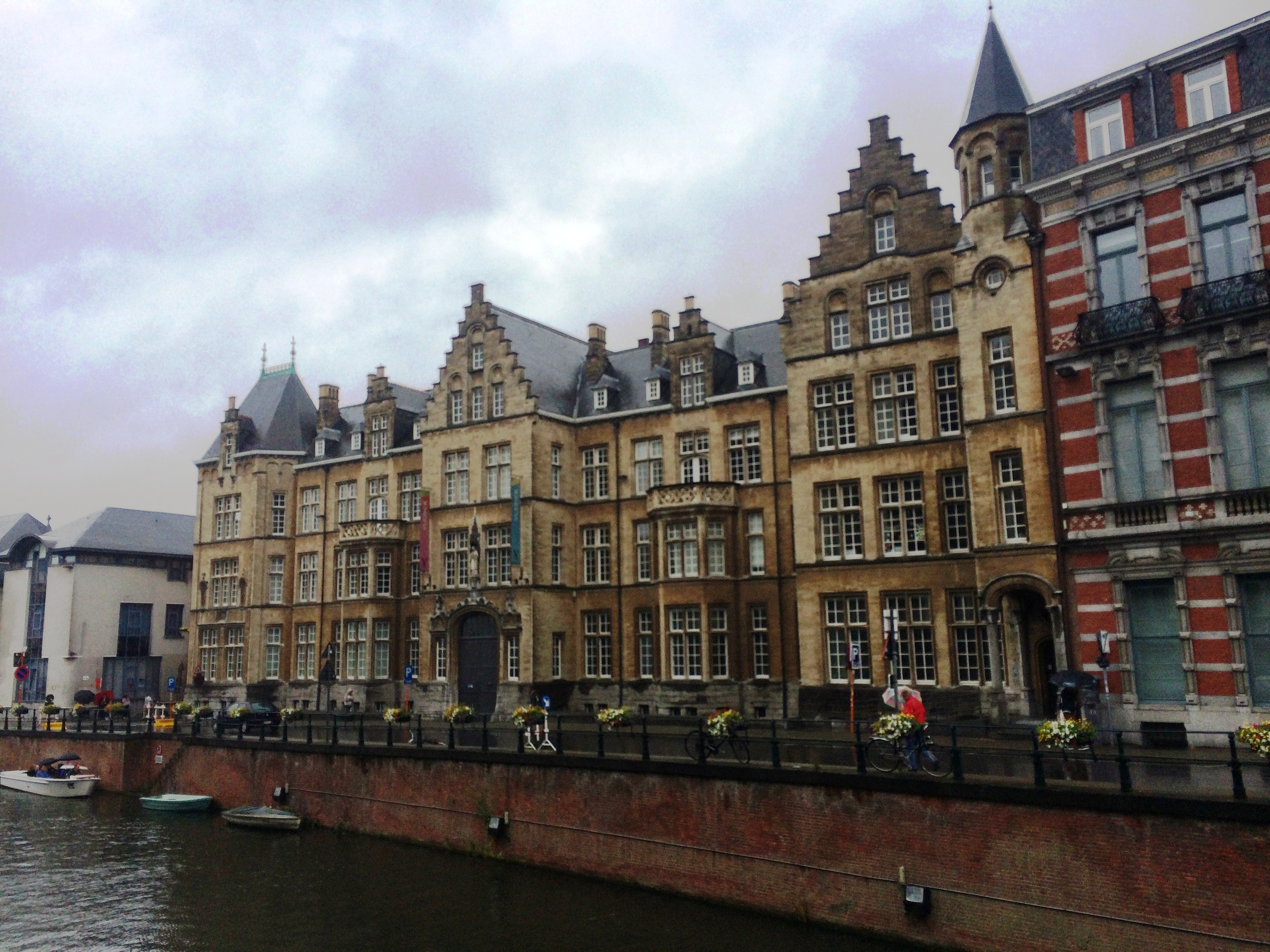
Vlerick Business School in Ghent, Belgium

The building of its Ghent campus since 2007 was built in 1905 by Mgr Antoon Stillemans, as the major seminary of the Ghent diocese. The diocese then sold the building to the province.

== Organisation ==
Vlerick has three campuses in Belgium: Saint-Josse-ten-Noode (Brussels), Ghent, and Leuven. The campuses are made up of an independent building or, in Brussels, classrooms located on a building floor. Other campuses abroad have been opened for limited periods of time: a campus in Saint Petersburg (Russia) opened in 2013, and closed in 2019. Vlerick also has a cooperative program with BiMBA of Peking University's China Center for Economic Research in Beijing (China).

Vlerick offers MBA & Masters in Management, as well as general and specialized courses for managers, and custom-designed training for individual companies. Over 23,000 alumni in more than 100 countries are alumni of the management schools. In 2015, Vlerick MBA Program was ranked top 100 MBA Programs and Top 10 MBA Program in Entrepreneurship worldwide by Financial Times.

Vlerick also has an Executive PhD program. In Belgium, only universities are allowed to confer nationally-recognized doctoral degrees, and as such, the PhD degree in business administration is jointly and directly conferred by Katholieke Universiteit Leuven and Ghent University, top two universities of Belgium, after viva voce (thesis defence) in one of the two universities. Vlerick itself does not confer the degree of PhD, but instead, adds a diploma of DBA (not a degree). The official degree conferred upon completion of the program is simply "PhD", not "Executive PhD" or "DBA". This program was formerly called the DBA program, because the name of the degree conferred in Dutch was DBA; however, the degree was different from most DBAs in English-speaking countries, as the official English equivalent of the degree was PhD. The program name was officially changed in 2024 to "more accurately" convey "the high level of academic rigour and the doctoral focus of this research programme. It aligns the programme title with the awarded degree, thereby eliminating any potential confusion about the exact level of the degree. This change also aligns more closely with the expectations and aspirations of our students who are seeking a doctoral degree."

== Accreditation ==
Vlerick Business School is one of two Triple Crown business schools in Belgium and possesses accreditation by the American AACSB, the British AMBA, and the European EQUIS. Vlerick is a higher education institute which is recognized and subsidized by decree.

== Ranking ==
Vlerick ranks amongst international and European business schools as follows:

- The Economist ranked Vlerick number 47 among global full-time MBA in 2010.
- The MBA program ranked number 100 out of all global MBA programs in 2014 according to the Financial Times.
- Financial Times ranked Vlerick number 15 amongst European business schools in 2015.
- The EMBA program ranked number 82 amongst global EMBA programs in 2018 according to the Financial Times.
- The Masters in Management program ranked number 29 among global programs in 2013 according to the Financial Times.
- The Masters in Financial management program ranked 26th worldwide in 2018 according to the Financial Times.
- It is ranked #201-250 in 2023 by QS WUR Ranking by Subject.
- It is ranked #7,205 of 14,131 in the world in 2023 by EduRank.

== Notable alumni ==
- Alen Hadzic (born 1991), American fencer
- Frank Donck, director at KBC Bank
- Frank Meysman, Chairman of Thomas Cook Group plc.
- Jan Coene (born 1957), businessman
- Kris Peeters, politician and vice-president of the European Investment Bank
- Marc Coucke (born 1965), co-founder of Omega Pharma
- Paul Bulcke (born 1954), former CEO of Nestlé
- Rudy Provoost (born 1959), CEO of Rexel
