= Coene =

Coene and De Coene are surnames. Notable people with the names include:

== Coene ==
- Constantinus Fidelio Coene (1779–1841), painter of history, genre, and landscape pieces
- Dominique Coene (born 1982), Belgian former professional tennis player
- Eline Coene (born 1964), Dutch badminton player
- Jacques Coene (1380–1411), Flemish painter, illustrator and architect
- Jan Coene (born 1957), Belgian businessman, disgraced by the Picanol Scandal
- Luc Coene (1947–2017), Belgian economist

== De Coene ==
- Jean Henri De Coene (1798–1866), Belgian painter of genre and historical subjects
