= Workforce sciences =

Workforce Sciences is an area of workforce measurement and management designed to streamline hiring of personnel in organizations. An emerging discipline, it focuses on the empirical determination of the workforce and business impact of the people side of business -- in order to help organizations find the "ideal" set of employees.

Workforce sciences spans the analysis of various workforce dynamics in organizations - the flow of talent into, through and out of organizations over time - and the effects of specific workforce practices and policies companies employ to influence those dynamics, including sourcing and selection, recruitment, on-boarding and training, career development, leadership development, supervision, performance measurement and management, total rewards, productivity improvement initiatives, among others. It is also concerned with determining the drivers of employee engagement and how they are conditioned by various strategic, operational and other contextual factors. It helps support hiring decisions, in particular strategic workforce planning and management, workforce or talent strategies as well as labor-market selection. The latter is an increasingly important dimension of workforce management as organizations deal with the global competition for talent. Finally, workforce sciences helps organizations identify metrics to track employees, providing dashboards and scorecards to help leaders monitor progress and hold them accountable for results.

Workforce sciences is a highly interdisciplinary field. It draws heavily from theories, empirical lessons and methods developed in the fields of Microeconomics, Labor and Organizational Economics and Industrial and Organizational Psychology; but it also comprises lessons and methods from demography, general management, marketing (advertising) and communications (public relations). With its strong empirical orientation, it relies heavily on application of statistical modeling, simulation and other measurement methods. Many of the analytic tools that support this new discipline have been in development since the mid-1990s. Some of the methods are wholly new to the HR area. Others represent adaptation of methods from other disciplines, as for instance, the application of techniques used by marketers to understand customer preference to better understand employee preferences concerning components of rewards. All have been facilitated by the proliferation of workforce and business data in various databases. Easy to access, and increasingly inexpensive to store, these datasets can be mined and used for statistical modeling. Ongoing advances in computing power continue to facilitate the data-mining and analytical processes.

Workforce sciences has its own theory, discipline and methods for identifying and measuring the performance of employees and businesses. The foundations for this science derive from the academic research into behavior in organizations, particularly academic studies of the links between various workforce management practices and performance. From economics, some of the core foundational theory dates from the 1960s in work done in academia by Jacob Mincer (1958), Theodore Schultz (1963), and Gary Becker (1964). But it was the development in the late 1970s, 1980s and 1990s of what is called, the New Economics of Personnel [See Lazear, Personnel Economics, 1995] that provided the core theoretical models in economics on which Workforce Sciences has drawn. More recently, the interest in behavioral economics, with its integration of Economics, Psychology and (increasingly) Neuroscience, has produced a new body of theoretical and empirical work that brings new insights and potential approaches.

On the business side, this research base is being synthesized by some practitioners into new managerial methods, and various consulting firms are focused on this enterprise. For example, Mercer's Workforce Sciences Institute has been in business since 1993.

Workforce Sciences is still in its formative stage as a management discipline. But the approach has taken root, measurement techniques are progressing, and some organizations are creating their own workforce-analytics departments.
