= Caroline Weber =

Caroline Weber may refer to:

- Caroline Weber (author) (born 1969), American historian
- Caroline Weber (gymnast) (born 1986), Austrian rhythmic gymnast
