= 2015 India GDP rebasing =

Recalculation of gross domestic product

In 2015, the Central Statistics Office (an office under the Ministry of Statistics and Programme Implementation) of the Government of India made a number of changes to the way it calculated the gross domestic product of India, including a change in the base year relative to which calculations are done. This change was known as the 2015 India GDP rebasing or just the rebasing.

== Timeline ==
The new method was used to release updated numbers for Fiscal Year 2013 (April 2013 to March 2014) and 2014 (April 2014 to March 2015). Initial announcements about the change were made in February 2015, and additional series were released in 2015; much of the commentary on the changes happened in April 2015.

== Changes made ==
There were two main changes made to bring Indian GDP calculations more in line with international standards as enshrined in the System of National Accounts: change of the base year to 2011/12, and switch to market prices. A number of other minor changes were made, such as better data sources, and new classification and calculation methods.

=== Change of base year ===
Since January 2010, the base year used by statisticians in India's Central Statistics Office was the months endinyear for calculations to the year ending March 2012 (i.e., the 2011/12 year). According to the Frontier Strategy Group, India changes the base year for its GDP calculation about once every five years, so this change was in keeping with past changes.

=== Change to using market prices ===
The change also switched GDP calculation to using market prices rather than factor costs. to take into account gross value addition in goods and services as well as indirect taxes and subsidies (adding taxes and reducing subsidies). The change was claimed by the government to be more in line with global practices, and specifically in line with the recommendations of the System of National Accounts (SNA) 2008. Commentators generally agreed; Tim Worstall of Forbes called the previous system of factor costs a relic of the state-driven, manufacturing-focused approach to the economy of the Nehruvian Fabian socialist era.

=== Incorporation of more and better survey data ===
The government of India identified three new categories of data sources that were now being used in GDP calculation to make it more reliable:

- Corporate sector surveys: Data was used from MCA21, the new initiative of the Ministry of Corporate Affairs. Coverage of the financial sector was also increased.
- Improved coverage of activities of local bodies, both rural and urban, for better coverage of government activity
- Results of the National Sample Surveys conducted by the Ministry of Statistics and Programme Implementation, specifically the Unincorporated Enterprise Survey (2010–11) and Employment-Unemployment Survey (2011–12).

=== Other changes ===
- A problem common to the old and new series was a lack of annual surveys, particularly to cover changes in the informal sector. The old method used a Labor Input (LI) method, which uses a benchmark-indicator process and then calculates output as the estimated labor input times the value added per worker. The new method used the Effective Labor Input (ELI) method, that distinguishes workers by productivity by assigning weights to different categories of workers.
- Industrial activities were now classified according to the National Industrial Classification (NIC) 2008.

== Effect on data series and reception of the change ==
=== Composition of GDP ===
Under NAS 2011-2012, the services sector constitutes a smaller proportion of overall GDP at 50.91% as of the fiscal year that ended March 2014 compared to 57.03% under the previous system. Under the new calculation method, industry became 31% compared to the old 25%, whereas services became 51% compared to the old 57%. Within industry, all three components, mining, manufacturing, and construction, were raised. This contrasted significantly with the results of past GDP rebasings, such as the 2010 Ghana GDP rebasing, and the 2014 Nigeria GDP rebasing and similar rebasings in Kenya, Uganda, Tanzania, and Zambia. FY14 growth rate was revised upward significantly, from 5% to 6.9% and the FY13 growth rate from 4.7% to 5.1%.

Some critics of the new method also noted that the downward revision of nominal GDP adversely affected various economic risk ratios.

=== The growth rate of GDP ===
GDP growth rates under the new series appeared to be higher than they had been under the old series; however, per the preceding section, this increase was achieved because the estimate of GDP level for previous years was lower in the new series than the old. The GDP being low with old method is just representation of how it was . The new method is better and is of international standards.

Initially, there was a lack of data points released with both the old and new methods for a meaningful comparison (specifically, the new series was not extended back in time so that its differences with the old series could be better understood). A number of people were critical of CSO for not providing this data.

The increase was considered suspicious by commentators who noted that other indicators (such as tax revenues) seemed to show a slowdown in economic growth, suggesting that either the role of the informal, untaxed sector was increasing fast, or some of the data was wrong.

== See also ==
- 2010 Ghana GDP rebasing
- 2014 Nigeria GDP rebasing
