= Pinelopi Koujianou Goldberg =

Greek-American economist

Penny Goldberg

Chief Economist of the World Bank
- In office 26 November 2018 – 1 March 2020
- President: Jim Yong Kim; Kristalina Georgieva (Acting); David Malpass
- Preceded by: Shanta Devarajan (acting)
- Succeeded by: Aart Kraay (acting)

Personal details
- Born: Pinelopi Koujianou; 1963 (age 62–63) Athens, Greece
- Children: 2
- Education: University of Freiburg (Diplom); Stanford University (MA, PhD)
- Awards: Guggenheim Fellow (2010–2011); American Academy of Arts and Sciences (2014); National Academy of Sciences (2019)

Academic work
- Discipline: International economics Development economics Applied microeconomics
- Institutions: Princeton University; Columbia University; Yale University
- Website: Official website; Information at IDEAS / RePEc

Pinelopi "Penny" Koujianou Goldberg (born 1963) is a Greek-American economist who served as chief economist of the World Bank from 2018 until 2020. She holds the named chair of William Nordhaus Professor of Economics and Global Affairs at Yale University. She is the current President-Elect of the American Economic Association.

== Early life and education ==
Goldberg was born in Athens, Greece. She received a Diplom in economics from the University of Freiburg in 1986 and a PhD from Stanford University in 1992.

== Career ==
Goldberg teaches at Yale University, where she is the William Nordhaus Professor of Economics and Global Affairs. At Yale, she was initially one of only three female economics professors to have been granted tenure. She previously held faculty positions at Columbia University (1999–2001), Princeton University (1992–99 and 2007–10), and Yale (2001–07 and 2010–present).

In 2011, Goldberg became the first woman appointed as editor-in-chief of the American Economic Review, one of the most prestigious journals in economics. She was the editor-in-chief from 2011 to 2016 and co-editor from 2010 to 2016 and in 2017.

Goldberg was appointed by Jim Yong Kim as the chief economist of the World Bank on April 27, 2018, and joined in November 2018. During her time in office, she was on public service leave from Yale University. In February 2020, she announced that she would resign effective March 1, 2020, to return to her position at Yale. She was succeeded by Aart Kraay, director of research in the Development Research Group, as interim chief economist until a permanent successor could be found. She did not state her reasons for resigning, but The Economist speculated that displeasure at senior World Bank officials, who are alleged to have suppressed research finding that some World Bank foreign aid is captured by local elites, may have played a role.

Goldberg is a member of the U.S. National Academy of Sciences, a fellow of American Academy of Arts and Sciences, fellow of the Econometric Society and its president for 2021, a faculty research associate of the National Bureau of Economic Research, a member of the board of BREAD (Bureau for Research and Economic Analysis of Development), and a research affiliate of the International Growth Centre of the London School of Economics. She is a recipient of the John Simon Guggenheim Memorial Foundation fellowship and the Bodossaki Prize in social sciences.

== Research ==
Goldberg's dozens of published works focus on applied microeconomics, international trade, and industrial organization. More recently, she has studied the impact of trade liberalization on growth and the income distribution, the effects of intellectual property rights enforcement in developing countries, and the determinants of incomplete exchange-rate pass-through.

In joint work with Nina Pavcnik, Amit Khandelwal, Petia Topalova, and Jan De Loecker, Goldberg has studied the effects of the 1990s trade liberalization in India on domestic production and the variety of products available in the domestic Indian market and on the costs faced by Indian producers.

In a paper published in the Quarterly Journal of Economics in 2020, jointly written with economists Pablo K. Fajgelbaum, Patrick J. Kennedy, and Amit K. Khandelwal, Goldberg analyzed the effects of the 2018 Trump tariffs and China–United States trade war on the US economy and estimated losses of $68.8 billion to consumers and producers due to higher prices. The total effect, which also accounts for the benefits of higher prices to US producers and government revenue from tariffs, was estimated to be $7.8 billion. The authors further analyzed the distribution of losses across sectors and counties, finding that workers in tradeable sectors in heavily Republican counties were especially worse off.

Her research on measuring human capital, co-written with Simeon Djankov, Noam Angrist, and Harry Patrinos, provides the underpinnings for the World Bank's Human Capital Index.

More recently, Goldberg has worked to write about the lack of importance of waiving vaccine patents. She argues against the current push by the WHO and by many other global organizations by stating that production capacity is not the main constraint that individuals face in attaining vaccination, thus discrediting the argument for major companies waiving vaccine patents. Goldberg makes the point that greater funding for ordering vaccination and sending surpluses of vaccine production in high-income countries is the main solution to better distribution for the vaccine.

Goldberg has been published in a variety of journals and commended for her research, notably The Quarterly Journal of Economics, American Economic Review, Handbook of Commercial Policy, Econometrica, and The Annual Review of Economics.

In 2023 MIT Press published The Unequal Effects of Globalization (with contributions from Greg Larson). The monograph is based on Goldberg’s Ohlin Lecture, which was given at the Stockholm School of Economics on November 4, 2019.

Since 2020 Goldberg has written a regular column at Project Syndicate.

In September 2026 Elsevier will publish volume 6A of Handbook of Development Economics, co-authored by Goldberg, Pascaline Dupas, and Rohini Pande.

== Awards and distinctions ==
In 2023 Goldberg was awarded an honorary doctorate from the University of Freiburg. In 2024 she was named a Distinguished Fellow by the Center for Economic Studies (CES) in Munich.

In 2025 she was the recipient of three significant distinctions. The WZB Berlin Social Science Center honored her with the A.SK Award. Additionally, she received the Jean-Jacques Laffont Prize from the Toulouse School of Economics, and the British Academy named her an International Fellow.

In 2026 she received the Bodossaki Excellence Award. At the ceremony Sir Richard Blundell noted that Goldberg is “the world’s leading empirical researcher in the field of globalization and trade policy.”

== Selected works ==
- Goldberg, Pinelopi; Michael M. Knetter (1997). "Goods Prices and Exchange Rates: What Have We Learned?" (PDF). Journal of Economic Literature. 35 (3): 1243–1272.
- Goldberg, Pinelopi Koujianou; Nina Pavcnik (2007). "Distributional effects of globalization in developing countries" (PDF). Journal of Economic Literature. 45 (1): 39–82. doi:10.1257/jel.45.1.39. S2CID 2781263.
- Goldberg, Pinelopi Koujianou; Giovanni Maggi (1999). "Protection for Sale: An Empirical Investigation" (PDF). American Economic Review. 89 (5): 1135–1155. doi:10.1257/aer.89.5.1135. JSTOR 117051. S2CID 59519982.
- Goldberg, Pinelopi Koujianou (1995). "Product differentiation and oligopoly in international markets: The case of the US automobile industry". Econometrica. 63 (4): 891–951. doi:10.2307/2171803. JSTOR 2171803.
- De Loecker, Jan; Pinelopi Koujianou Goldberg; Amit Khandelwal; Nina Pavcnik (March 2016). "Prices, Markups, and Trade Reform" (PDF). Econometrica. 84 (2): 445–510. doi:10.3982/ECTA11042.
- Goldberg, Pinelopi Koujianou; Amit Kumar Khandelwal; Nina Pavcnik; Petia Topalova (2010). "Imported intermediate inputs and domestic product growth: Evidence from India" (PDF). The Quarterly Journal of Economics. 125 (4): 1727–1767. doi:10.1162/qjec.2010.125.4.1727. S2CID 1888273.
- Goldberg, Penny; Amit Khandelwal; Nina Pavcnik; Petia Topalova (2010). "Multi-product Firms and Product Turnover in the Developing World: Evidence from India" (PDF). Review of Economics and Statistics. 92 (4): 1042–1049. doi:10.1162/rest_a_00047. S2CID 748596.
- Attanasio, Orazio; Pinelopi K. Goldberg; Nina Pavcnik (2004). "Trade reforms and wage inequality in Colombia" (PDF). Journal of Development Economics. 74 (2): 331–366. doi:10.1016/j.jdeveco.2003.07.001. S2CID 158824614.
- Goldberg, Pinelopi K.; Nina Pavcnik (2003). "The Response of the Informal Sector to Trade Liberalization". Journal of Development Economics. 72 (2): 463–496.
- Chaudhuri, Shubham; Pinelopi K. Goldberg; Panle Jia Barwick (2006). "Estimating the Effects of Global Patent Protection in Pharmaceuticals: A Case Study of Quinolones in India". American Economic Review. 96 (5): 1477–1514.
- Fajgelbaum, Pablo D.; Pinelopi K. Goldberg; Patrick J. Kennedy; Amit K. Khandelwal (2020). "The Return to Protectionism". Quarterly Journal of Economics. 135 (1): 1–55.
- Hyland, Marie; Simeon Djankov; Pinelopi K. Goldberg (2020). "Gendered Laws and Women in the Workforce". AER: Insights. 2 (4): 475–490.
- Angrist, Noam; Simeon Djankov; Pinelopi K. Goldberg; Harry Anthony Patrinos (2021). "Measuring Human Capital Using Global Learning Data". Nature. 592 (7854): 1–6.
- Goldberg, Pinelopi K.; Tristan Reed (2023). "Presidential Address: Demand-Side Constraints in Development: The Role of Market Size, Trade, and (In)Equality". Econometrica. 91 (6): 1915–1950.
- Chiplunkar, Gaurav; Pinelopi K. Goldberg (2024). "Aggregate Implications of Barriers to Female Entrepreneurship". Econometrica. 92 (6): 1801–1835.
- Dix-Carneiro, Rafael; Costas Meghir; Pinelopi K. Goldberg; Gabriel Ulyssea (2026). "Trade and Domestic Distortions: The Case of Informality". Econometrica. 94 (2): 573–618.

Diplomatic posts
Preceded by Shanta Devarajan; Acting	Chief Economist of the World Bank; 2018–2020	Succeeded by Aart Kraay; Acting
