= Donck =

Donck may refer to:

- Adriaen van der Donck (1618–1655), lawyer and landowner in New Netherland
- Cluysen-Ter Donck, a hamlet on the Ghent-Terneuzen Canal and the site of the International Regatta KRC Ghent, Belgium
- Colen Donck, Dutch-American owned estate north of Manhattan originally owned by Adriaen van der Donck
- Flory Van Donck (1912–1992), Belgium professional golfer
- Frank Donck, Belgian businessman
