= 2010 Ghana GDP rebasing =

In November 2010, the government of Ghana made a number of changes to the way it calculated GDP, resulting in a 60% upward change in its estimate. The change led to discussion of the accuracy of GDP estimates, particularly in the context of Africa. It was also the first of many rebasings undertaken by African economies, most of which led to significant upward revisions in their estimates of GDP.

== Changes made ==
=== Change of base year ===
The base year for calculations was changed from 1993 to 2006. In a paper discussing the change, development economists Morten Jerven and Magnus Ebo Duncan noted: "Upward revisions stemming from changes in outdated base years are common in developed countries such as the United States (Runkle 1998)" and also said that one contributor to the high magnitude of the upward revision was the huge increment in base year (by 13 years) as opposed to more regular updates done in countries such as the United States.

=== Change in compilation methodology ===
The compilation methodology was changed from one based on the 1968 System of National Accounts (SNA) to the 1993 SNA. In a speech at the IARIW-SSA conference, World Bank economist Shanta Devarajan identified this as the main cause for the huge upward bump in GDP.

=== Improvement and revision of data sources ===
New and better data sources were used for the new GDP series.

=== Change in industry classification ===
The new GDP series used the International Standard Industrial Classification (ISIC) version 4.

== Effect on data series ==
=== Total GDP estimate went up by 60% ===
The news brief from the Ghana Statistical Service announcing the change noted that the new GDP series estimated a 60.3% larger GDP in the base year 2006 than the old GDP series. This number of 60% would be echoed by other sources discussing the matter. This would contrast with the 2015 India GDP rebasing, which would result in a slight downward revision of India's total GDP estimate.

=== Sectoral distribution of GDP changed but trends remained similar ===
The new method showed lower shares in GDP of agriculture (dropped by about 8 percentage points) and industry (dropped by about 8 percentage points) and a compensatory higher share in GDP of services (increased by about 16 percentage points). Trend lines for all three sectors were fairly similar between the new and old series. This would contrast with the 2015 India GDP rebasing, where the share of services in GDP would be revised downward and the share of industry would be revised upward.

== Reception by development economists ==
Immediately after the announcement, Todd Moss wrote in the Center for Global Development blog: "Boy, we really don’t know anything." Moss noted that Ghana had been one of the more heavily scrutinized economies of Africa, and that Moss had himself done a Ph.D. on Ghana, yet the numbers were so off. This made him pessimistic about the quality of statistics for other countries.

On October 6, 2011, Shanta Devarajan, World Bank economist, penned a blog post titled Africa's statistical tragedy, a wordplay on Easterly and Levine's classic Africa's Growth Tragedy. In the post, Devarajan noted that the absence of high-quality statistical data hampered Africa, development economists and international institutions, and donors, but that the problem could be rectified.

In August 2012, Revising GDP estimates in Sub-Saharan Africa: Lessons from Ghana by Morten Jerven and Magnus Ebo Ducan was published in The African Statistical Journal. Jerven also wrote about the issue in The Guardian in November 2012, leading to additional commentary from The Washington Post.

== See also ==
- 2014 Nigeria GDP rebasing
- 2015 India GDP rebasing
