= Alaka Basu =

Indian sociologist, demographer and professor (born 1951)

Alaka Malwade Basu (born 1951) is an Indian sociologist and demographer, a professor of development sociology at the Cornell University in Ithaca, New York. Between 2002 and 2008, she was the director of the South Asia Program of Cornell University. She is a senior fellow for public health at the United Nations Foundation and a member of the editorial boards of the Population and Development Review and the Asian Population Studies. She is also a member of the Lancet-Guttmacher Commission on sexual and reproductive health and rights. Basu has extensive publications in the fields of social demography, gender and development, and South Asian Studies.

She was formerly a professor at the Jawaharlal Nehru University in New Delhi and at the Harvard School of Public Health in Massachusetts, and the chairperson of the scientific committee on anthropological demography at the International Union for the Scientific Study of Population (IUSSP) and member of committees on population projections and reproductive health at the National Research Council of the National Academy of Sciences, United States. She has also served in the governing boards of the Population Reference Bureau in Washington, D.C. and the Population Association of America.

== Personal life ==
Alaka Malwade Basu is married to the economist Kaushik Basu. They have one son, Karna Basu, and one daughter, the writer and actor Diksha Basu.

== Bibliography ==
=== Books ===
- Culture, the Status of Women, and Demographic Behaviour: Illustrated with the Case of India. (1992) Oxford University Press. ISBN 978-0-19-828360-7.
- Girls' Schooling, Women's Autonomy and Fertility Change in South Asia. (eds. 1996; with Jeffery, Roger) Sage Publications. ISBN 978-0-8039-9276-4.
- The Methods and Uses of Anthropological Demography. (eds. 1998; with Aaby, Peter) Oxford University Press. ISBN 978-0-19-158446-6.
- The Sociocultural and Political Aspects of Abortion: Global Perspectives. (eds. 2000) Greenwood Publishing Group. ISBN 978-0-275-97728-3.

=== Selected publications ===
- "Demography for the Public: Literary Representations of Population Research and Policy". (2004) Development and Change. 45 (5): 813–837 ISSN 1467-7660.
- Basu, AM; Desai, S (2016). "Hopes, Dreams and Anxieties: India's One-Child Families". Asian Popul Stud. 12: 4–27. doi:10.1080/17441730.2016.1144354. PMC 4869707. PMID 27200106.
- "Zika, Sex and Reproductive Health". Economic and Political Weekly. 51 (9): 7–8. 2015.
