= Diksha (disambiguation) =

Diksha translated as "preparation or consecration for a religious ceremony", is giving of a mantra or an initiation by the guru (in Guru–shishya tradition) of Indian religions such as Hinduism, Buddhism, and Jainism.

Diksha may also refer to:

== People ==
- Diksha Basu, American writer and actress
- Diksha Dagar (born 2000), Indian professional golfer
- Diksha Kumari (born 1999), Indian handball player
- Diksha Panth, Indian actress

== Other ==
- Diksha (film), 1991 Indian film
- Diksha Manjari, dance school in India
