= Beijing International MBA at Peking University =

MBA program at Peking University

Beijing International MBA at Peking University (BiMBA)
- Type: Public business school
- Established: 1998; 28 years ago
- Founder: Justin Yifu Lin
- Affiliations: Peking University
- Dean: Prof. Dayuan Hu, Prof. Zhuang Yang, Prof. Bruce Stening
- Students: 250 (150 in MBA) (100 in EMBA)
- Location: Langrun Garden inside the Peking University, Beijing, China
- Campus: Peking University
- Website: www.bimba.pku.edu.cn

Beijing International MBA at Peking University or (BiMBA) (simplified Chinese: 北大国际; traditional Chinese: 北大國際; pinyin: Běidà Guójì) is both an internationally and nationally top-ranked graduate business school of Peking University in Beijing, China. It was founded in 1998 by Justin Yifu Lin as a collaboration between Peking University and a consortium of Jesuit universities, led by Fordham University in the United States. Vlerick Business School in Belgium joined BiMBA in 2008 and is currently the degree-granting university. BiMBA is operated by the National School of Development (NSD), formerly known as China Center for Economic Research at Peking University. The school offers a range of MBA programs from full-time, to part-time, and executive MBA programs.

Current Dean of BiMBA Mr. Yang Zhuang said in an article with the Chinese news website money.163.com that the value of BiMBA's education lies in its "internationalization". BiMBA has a very traditional Chinese atmosphere in terms of its building structures, however 30-40% of enrolled students in its full-time MBA program comes from abroad, and more than 80% has academic backgrounds from established foreign institutions. The diverse atmosphere coupled with a focus on smaller classes stimulates the students to reflect with one another and actively participate in class.

BiMBA's full-time MBA program is consistently ranked 2nd by Forbes magazine for China's Best business school, and its part-time program is ranked second, only behind Peking University's older Guanghua School of Management. BiMBA was ranked 11th by QS Global 200 Business Schools 2012 in the Asia & Australia Region. Businessweek has called BiMBA program "An MBA with a heart".

== History ==
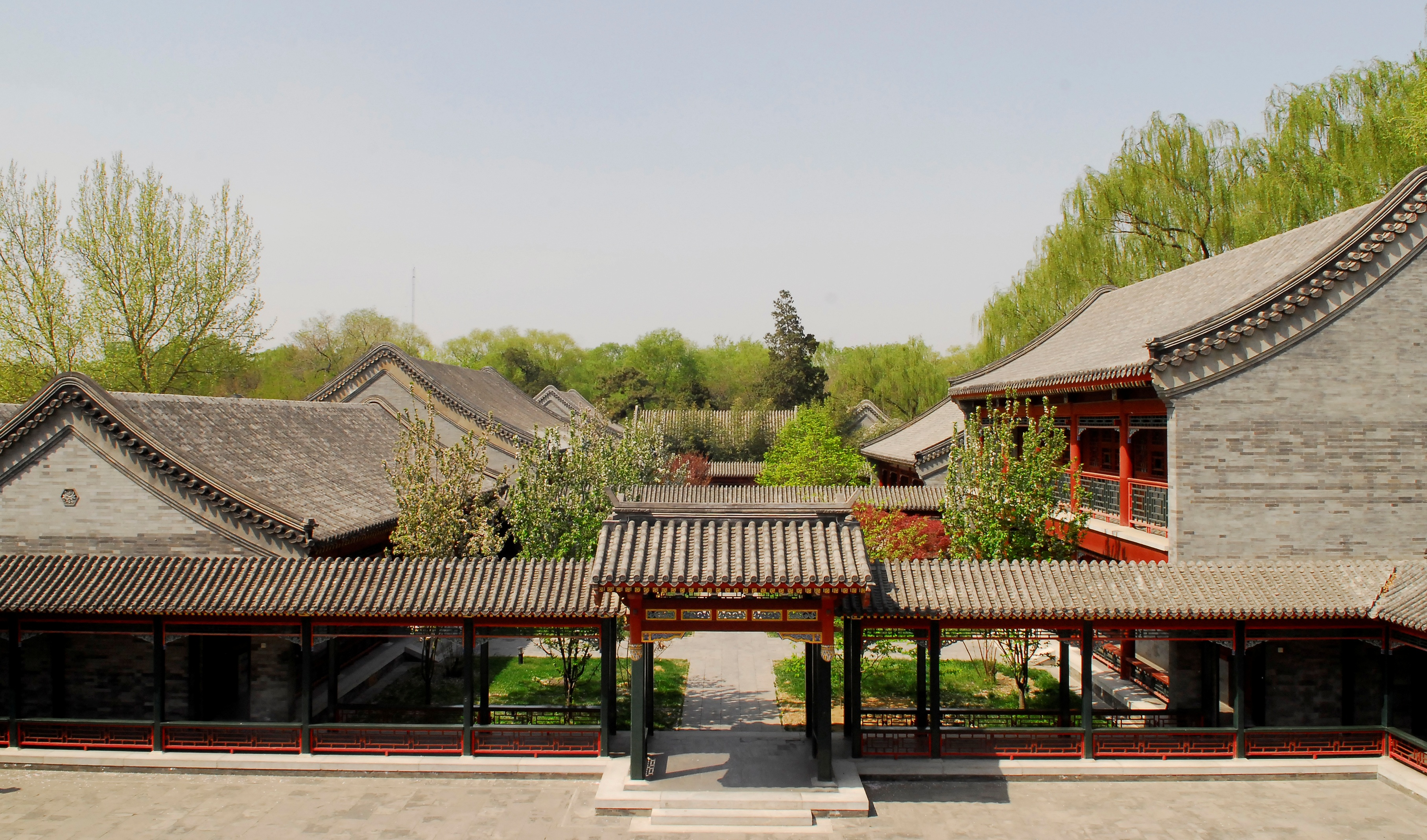
The campus of the business school is located at the north-eastern section of Peking University, inside the Langrun Garden

BiMBA was first established in 1998 between China Center for Economic Research and a consortium of 26 Jesuit universities in the United States, led by Fordham University. The joint-educational venture contract was signed in Creighton University located in Omaha, Nebraska, United States, and BiMBA became the first business school in China to be allowed to award an international MBA degree, approved by the Chinese government. Each year, professors came from each of the 26 universities to teach the full-time and part-time MBA program at BiMBA. Upon graduation, the students traveled to Fordham University to receive their degree. Since 2004, BiMBA has established a partnership with West Point where each year, BiMBA students will have a chance to travel to New York and receive character-building tips and lessons from the drillmasters at West Point Academy. In 2008, upon the expiration of the original joint-venture contract, BiMBA signed with Vlerick Business School in Belgium, and Vlerick took the role of the degree granting institution for BiMBA's MBA programs. Fordham remained in partnership with BiMBA, and is now the degree granting institution for Post-MBA education, such as the Master of Global Finance (MSGF).

== Campus ==
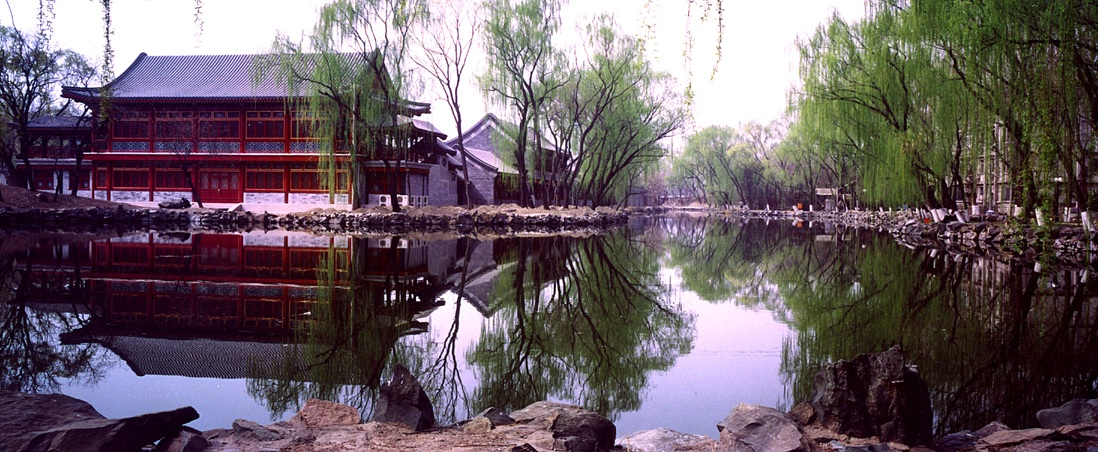
Scenery at the Langrun Garden, Peking University

BiMBA is located at the north eastern part of Peking University, inside the Langrun Garden. Langrun Garden used to be a part of one of the annexes of the Old Summer Palace (Yuan Ming Yuan).

== Academic program ==
BiMBA offers Full-time/Part-time MBA programs as well as executive level educational programs. The full-time MBA program is BiMBA's most diverse program, and 30-40% of enrolled students are foreign. BiMBA's part-time MBA and EMBA program is consistently ranked highest among its competitors by Forbes Magazine for "Most Valuable Part-time MBA program in China". Like other international MBA programs in China, BiMBA uses standardized tests such as GMAT, TOEFL, IELTS, etc. The MBA programs are all completely taught in English, whereas the EMBA and Post-MBA Masters programs are taught in a mixture of English and Chinese.

== See also ==
- Peking University HSBC Business School
- China Center for Economic Research
