= Rudy Provoost =

Belgian businessman and entrepreneur (born 1959)

- Born: 16 October 1959 (age 67); Belgium
- Education: Vlerick Business School
- Occupations: Businessman and entrepreneur
- Known for: Electrical energy usage transformation

Rudy Provoost (born 16 October 1959) is a Belgian businessman and entrepreneur who has focused on products related to electrical energy transformation.

== Early life and education ==
Provoost was born 16 October 1959 in Belgium. He obtained a Master's degree in Psychology from Ghent University (1982), and a Master's degree in Business Management from the Vlerick Business School (1983) in Belgium.

== Career ==
=== Early year ===
Provoost started his career at Procter & Gamble in 1984, before moving to Canon in 1987.

In 1992, he joined Whirlpool Corporation as managing director for Belgium and was later promoted to vice-president, consumer services for Europe (based in Germany). He became vice-president, group sales, whirlpool Europe, senior officer and member of the Chairman’s Council of Whirlpool Corporation in 1994 (based in Italy). In 1996, Provoost moved on to become vice-president, group marketing, Europe, and a member of Whirlpool Corporation’s Brand Council. In early 1999, he was promoted to vice-president, Whirlpool Brand Group, Europe.

=== Philips ===
In 2000, Provoost joined Royal Philips to lead the European Philips Consumer Electronics business (based in The Netherlands).

In 2004 he was appointed CEO of Philips Consumer Electronics, and in 2006 became a member of the management board of Royal Philips. Under his tenure, the consumer electronics division was restructured with a focus on innovation.

In 2008, Provoost became CEO of the Philips Lighting division.

=== Rexel ===
Provoost joined Rexel in October 2011 and became CEO and chairman of the management board at the beginning of 2012 (based in France). Shortly after joining Rexel, he announced the “Energy in Motion” company plan.

In May 2013, Provoost became chairman of the Rexel Foundation for a better energy future, which was launched under the auspices of the Fondation de France.

In May 2014, Provoost was named chairman of the board of directors and CEO of Rexel. At the end of June 2016, Provoost relinquished his positions of chairman and CEO. Provoost is also a board member for Elia and Vlerick Business School.

== Other positions ==
Provoost is the founder and managing director of YquitY, a company delivering advisory, consultancy and business development, investment and management services.

He is a member of the supervisory board and the strategic committee of Randstad, as well as a member of the board of directors of Elia. He is also a member of the board of directors of the Vlerick Business School.

He was a member of the board of directors of the TCL Corporation (headquartered in China) between 2007 and 2009, and chairman of the board of directors of LG.Philips LCD (later renamed LG Display, headquartered in South Korea) between 2006 and 2008. From 2008 until 2010, he was a member of the board of the European Federation of Quality Management (EFQM). Provoost also served as president and chairman of the executive board of DIGITALEUROPE (formerly called EICTA, the European Information & Communications Technology Industry Association).

== Publications ==
Provoost is a contributing author to the book The balancing act of innovation as well as the Knowledge@Wharton series.

He is also author of Energy 3.0, a book which discusses the digital transformation of the energy world. The book is published in English and French by Cherche Midi.
