= 2014 Nigeria GDP rebasing =

In April 2014, the National Bureau of Statistics, Nigeria, under the government of Nigeria, announced changes to the way it calculated GDP, changing the calculation to more accurately reflect current prices and market structure, thus giving more weight to Nollywood and mobile phone services that had grown a lot recently. As a result, Nigeria's estimate of its GDP increased by 89%, moving it from Africa's second biggest economy (after South Africa) to the biggest economy. These changes were known as the 2014 Nigeria GDP rebasing or simply the rebasing.

== Changes made ==
=== Change of base year ===
The base year for calculation (including information on the market structure) was updated from 1990 to 2010. This was a fairly huge increment in base year; for comparison, the 2010 Ghana GDP rebasing updated the base year from 1993 to 2006, and the 2015 India GDP rebasing updated the base year from 2004/05 to 2011/12.

=== Change of data sources ===
GDP can be estimated through three methods: production, income, and expenditure. GDP calculations in Nigeria were previously done purely through the production method. The new data included results on income and expenditure, allowing for better reconciliation of data.

== Effect on data series ==
=== Overall estimate of economy size increased significantly ===
The estimate of total GDP of Nigeria increased from 42.4 trillion naira (US$270 billion at exchange rates) to 80.2 trillion naira (US$510 billion at exchange rates), an 89% increase. This was similar to the result of rebasings in other African economies around that time, including Kenya, Uganda, Tanzania, and Zambia, and also matched the result of the 2010 Ghana GDP rebasing. It contrasted with the experience of the 2015 India GDP rebasing, where the overall estimate of the size of the economy was slightly reduced.

Nigeria's GDP increase far exceeded the expectations of analysts who had forecast an increase of between 40 and 60 per cent following the rebasing exercise.

As a result of the size change, the stock market capitalization to GDP ratio estimate reduced from 33% to 18% (for comparison, the corresponding ratio for South Africa at the time was 270%). Nigeria's finance minister Ngozi Okonjo-Iweala believed this would be interesting to foreign investors interested in the upside potential of emerging markets.

=== Sectoral composition shifted toward services and away from oil ===
As a result of this change, more weight was given in the new series to services, with the role of Nollywood (the film industry) and mobile phones increasing significantly. In particular, the telecom industry accounting for more than a quarter of the increase in the GDP estimate. After telecoms, the biggest contributor to the upward shift was traders; this was achieved by increasing the sample of firms from which GDP data are calculated by a factor of about ten. The fraction of the economy devoted to oil reduced by more than half to 14%.

In a report for the Brookings Institution on the rebasing in Nigeria as well as similar rebasings in Kenya, Tanzania, Uganda, and Zambia, Amadou Sy noted that the rebasings highlighted the problems of relying on outdated data ad calculation methods that was prevalent prior to the rebasings, and also that the rebasings showed the importance and growth of the services sector. Sy called this a structural transformation in African economies that needed to be understood better. The increase in the size of the services sector was also noticed in the 2010 Ghana GDP rebasing. In contrast, the 2015 India GDP rebasing saw a downward correction in the size of the services sector and a corresponding upward correction in the size of industry.

== See also ==
- 2010 Ghana GDP rebasing
- 2015 India GDP rebasing
