= Justin Yifu Lin =

Chinese economist and professor (born 1952)

- 林毅夫
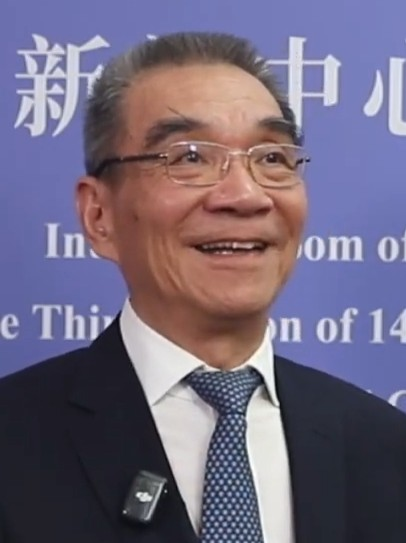
- Lin in 2025

Chief Economist of the World Bank
- In office June 2008 – June 2012
- President: Robert Zoellick
- Preceded by: François Bourguignon
- Succeeded by: Martin Ravallion (Acting)

Personal details
- Born: Lin Cheng-yi; 15 October 1952 (age 73) Yilan County, Taiwan
- Education: National Taiwan University (attended); Republic of China Military Academy (BS); National Chengchi University (MBA); Peking University (MA); University of Chicago (PhD)
- Scientific career
- Fields: Political economy
- Workplaces: World Bank; Peking University
- Thesis: The Household Responsibility System in China's Agricultural Reform: A Study of the Causes and Effects of an Institutional Change (1986)
- Doctoral advisors: D. Gale Johnson; Theodore Schultz; Sherwin Rosen

Military service
- Allegiance: Republic of China (1952–1979)
- Branch/service: Republic of China Army
- Years of service: 1971–1979 (Note: Defected to the People's Republic of China.)
- Rank: Captain
- Website: Information at IDEAS / RePEc

Justin Yifu Lin (Chinese: 林毅夫; pinyin: Lín Yìfū; born 15 October 1952) is a Chinese economist and professor of economics at Peking University. He served as the chief economist of the World Bank from 2008 to 2012, and was also the World Bank's senior vice president during that time. He has served as a State Council Counsellor of China since September 2013.

Born in Yilan County, Taiwan, Lin was a ground force captain and company commander of the Republic of China Army on the Kinmen Islands, where he swam across the channel and sought refuge in Xiamen of the People's Republic of China in May 1979. After settling in mainland China, Lin became an economist after graduating from Peking University and earning a PhD from the University of Chicago, where he studied under Nobel Prize laureate Theodore Schultz.

After completing his postdoctoral studies at Yale University, he returned to Beijing and became a professor of economics at Peking University in 1987. He founded the China Center for Economic Research (currently the Peking University National School of Development) and was later appointed Chief Economist and Senior Vice President of the World Bank where he served from 2008 to 2012. After that, he returned to Beijing and to his research at Peking University.

His main academic theory is called New Structural Economics. At Peking University, he currently serves as the Dean of the Institute of New Structural Economics, the Honorary Dean of the National Development Institute, and the Dean of the Institute of South-South Cooperation and Development. In 2026, Lin was elected a Fellow of Econometric Society.

== Biography ==
=== Early life ===
Lin was born on 15 October 1952 in Yilan County, Taiwan, as Lin Cheng-yi (simplified Chinese: 林正义; traditional Chinese: 林正義; pinyin: Lín Zhèngyì). Lin attended high school at National Yilan Senior High School. In 1971, he was admitted to National Taiwan University's College of agriculture to study agricultural machinery at the department of agricultural engineering. American strategist Michael Pillsbury remembered Lin being the president of the university's student body in 1971 while he was studying Chinese at the same university. In 1971, Lin left school as a freshman student in order to volunteer for military service in the army.

=== Early education and seeking asylum ===
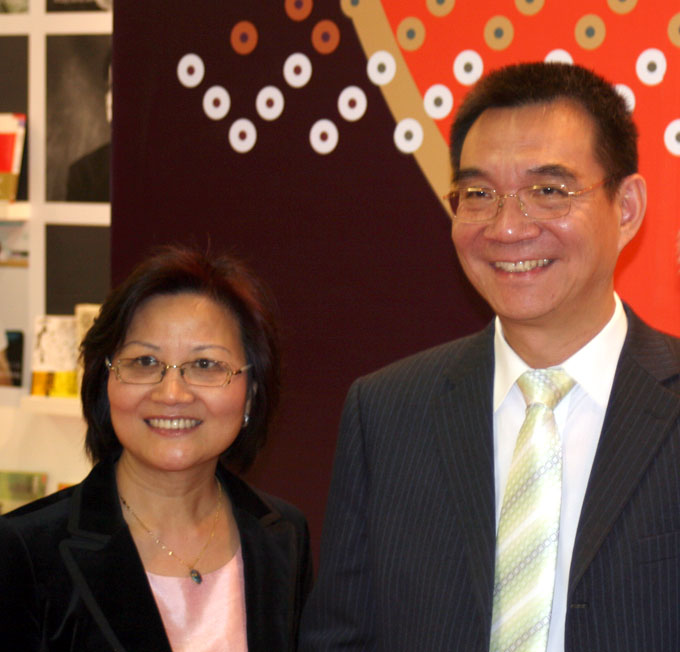
Justin Yifu Lin and his wife at the Frankfurt Book Fair 2009

In 1976, Lin entered the MBA program at National Chengchi University in Taiwan on a defense scholarship and returned to the army upon receiving his MBA in 1978. As a captain in the Republic of China Army (ROCA) in Taiwan, he swam from Kinmen Islands to Xiamen, which is under the control of the People's Republic of China (PRC), for asylum on 16 May 1979. Lin initially left his pregnant wife and his three-year-old child in Taiwan; a year after his asylum, he was declared "missing" by the ROC Army and his wife claimed the equivalent of US$31,000 from the government. His wife and their children rejoined him years later when both of them went to study in the United States. While an officer in the ROC Army, Lin was held up as a model soldier; after his desertion, the ROC originally listed him as missing but in 2000 issued an order for his arrest on charges of defection, and remains a fugitive by the ROC government.

In a letter written to his family in Taiwan about a year after his asylum, Lin stated that "based on my cultural, historical, political, economic and military understanding, it is my belief that returning to the motherland is a historical inevitability; it is also the optimal choice." A National Taiwan University alumnus Cheng Hung-sheng confirmed Lin's reason and motive. Lin's oldest brother said it was unfair to brand his younger brother a traitor. "I don't understand why people regard him as a villain," he said. "My brother just wanted to pursue his ambitions."

=== Later education and career ===
Lin received a master's degree in political economy from Peking University in 1982, and a PhD in economics from the University of Chicago in 1986. He was one of the first PRC citizens to receive a PhD in economics from the University of Chicago.

On 16 September 2008, Fordham University honored Lin with a reception for being chief economist and senior vice president of the World Bank. Lin received an Honorary Doctorate from Fordham University in 2009 and was elected a Corresponding Fellow of the British Academy in 2010. His 2012 book, The Quest for Prosperity: How Developing Economies Can Take Off, argued for an active role for government in nurturing development, not just through the traditional provision of infrastructure and legal enforcement, but also by identifying and actively supporting industries that contribute to growth.

Lin is the founder and first director of the China Center for Economic Research and a former professor of economics at Peking University and at the Hong Kong University of Science and Technology. He is also an adviser to the China Finance 40 Forum (CF40).

== Works ==
=== Selected books ===
- Lin, Justin Yifu, Fang Cai, and Zhou Li. The China Miracle: Development Strategy and Economic Reform. Hong Kong: Chinese University Press, 2003.
- Lin, Justin Yifu. Demystifying the Chinese Economy. Cambridge: Cambridge University Press, 2011.
- Lin, Justin Yifu. The Quest for Prosperity: How Developing Economies Can Take Off. Princeton, NJ: Princeton University Press, 2012.
- Lin, Justin Yifu. New structural economics: A framework for rethinking development and policy. The World Bank, 2012.

=== Selected articles ===
- Lin, Justin Yifu. "The Household Responsibility System in China's Agricultural Reform: A Theoretical and Empirical Study." Economic Development and Cultural Change 36, no. 3 (1988): 199–224.
- Lin, Justin Yifu. "Rural Reforms and Agricultural Growth in China," American Economic Review, 82 no. 1 (1992): 34-51.
- Lin, Justin Yifu and Dennis Tao Yang. “On the Causes of China's Agricultural Crisis and the Great Leap Famine," China Economic Review 9, no. 2 (1998): 125–140.
- Lin, Justin Yifu. "Competition, Policy Burdens, and State-owned Enterprise Reform," American Economic Review, 88 no. 2 (1998): 422-27.
- Lin, Justin Yifu. and Zhiqiang Liu. “Fiscal Decentralization and Economic Growth in China." Economic Development and Cultural Change 49, no. 1 (2000): 1–21.
- Lin, Justin Yifu. "China and the Global Economy," China Economic Journal, 4 no. 1 (2011): 1-14
- Lin, Justin Yifu. "New Structural Economics: A Framework for Rethinking Development," World Bank Research Observer, 26, no. 2 (2011): 193-221.

== Notes ==
Diplomatic posts
Preceded by François Bourguignon	Chief Economist of the World Bank; 2008–2012	Succeeded by Martin Ravallion; Acting
