= Paul Romer =

American economist and Nobel Laureate (born 1955)

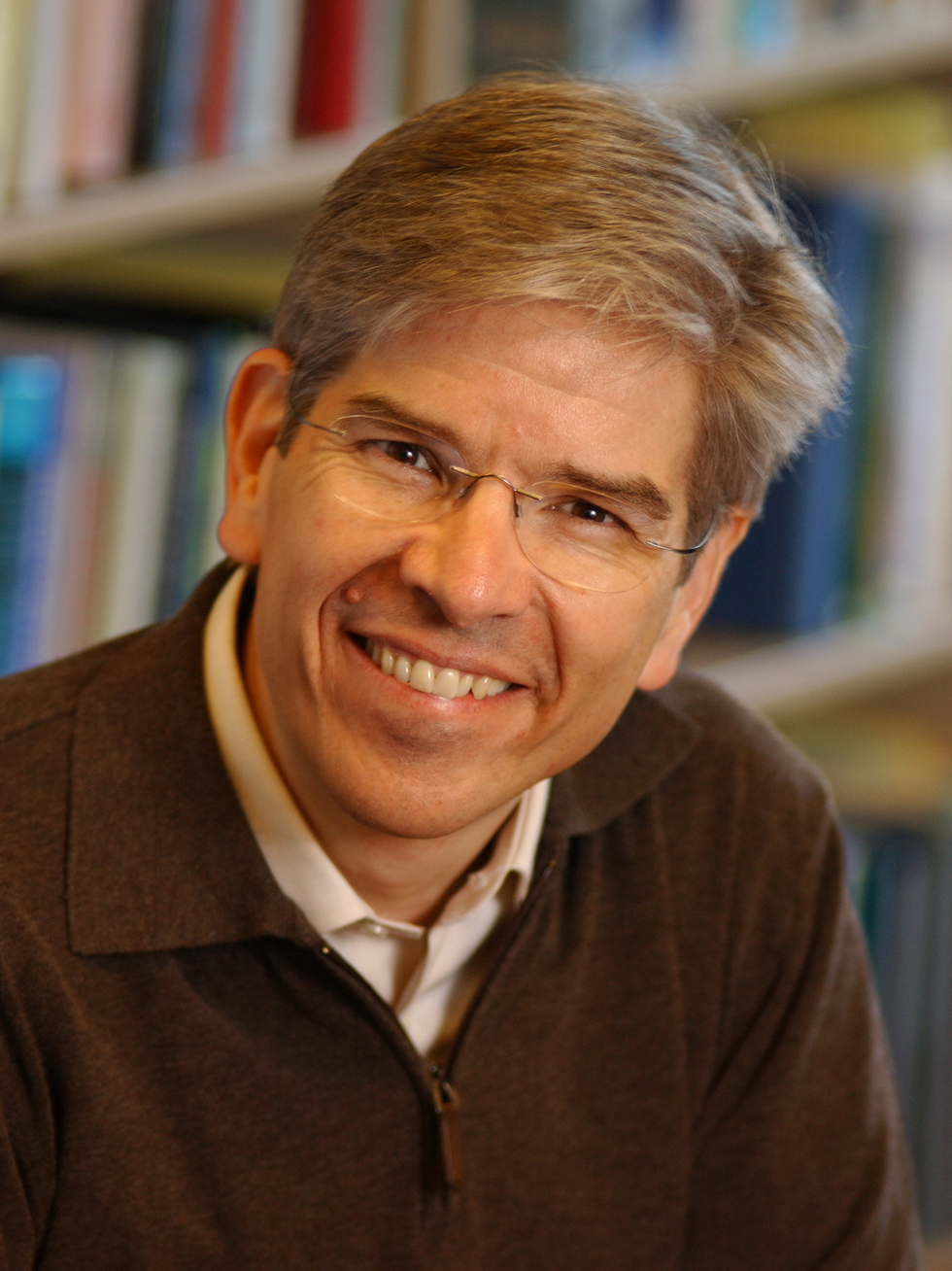
- Romer in 2005

Chief Economist of the World Bank
- In office October 2016 – January 24, 2018
- President: Jim Yong Kim
- Preceded by: Kaushik Basu
- Succeeded by: Shanta Devarajan (acting)

Personal details
- Born: Paul Michael Romer; November 6, 1955 (age 70) Denver, Colorado, U.S.
- Education: University of Chicago (BS, MS, PhD); Massachusetts Institute of Technology (attended); Queen's University (attended)
- Awards: Nobel Memorial Prize in Economic Sciences (2018)
- Website: Official website
- Scientific career
- Fields: Economics
- Institutions: New York University; Stanford University; University of California, Berkeley; University of Chicago; University of Rochester
- Thesis: Dynamic Competitive Equilibria with Externalities, Increasing Returns and Unbounded Growth (1983)
- Doctoral advisor: José Scheinkman; Robert Lucas Jr.
- Other academic advisors: Russell Davidson; Ivar Ekeland
- Doctoral students: Sérgio Rebelo; Maurice Kugler

Paul Michael Romer (born November 7, 1955) is an American economist and policy entrepreneur who is a Seidner University Professor in Finance at Boston College. Romer is best known as the former Chief Economist of the World Bank and for co-receiving the 2018 Nobel Memorial Prize in Economic Sciences (shared with William Nordhaus) for his work in endogenous growth theory. He also coined the term "mathiness," which he describes as misuse of mathematics in economic research.

Before joining Boston College, Romer was a professor at New York University, the University of Chicago, the University of California, Berkeley, Stanford University's Graduate School of Business, and the University of Rochester. Romer was chief economist and senior vice president of the World Bank until he resigned in January 2018 following a controversy arising from his claim of possible political manipulation of Chile's "ease of doing business" ranking. Romer took leave from his position as professor of economics at NYU when he joined the World Bank, and returned to NYU after his term. In addition, he has also been a researcher at the National Bureau of Economic Research, Stanford's Center for International Development, the Stanford Institute for Economic Policy Research, the Hoover Institution, as well as a fellow at the American Academy of Arts and Sciences and the Center for Global Development.

== Early life and education ==
Romer was born to former Colorado governor Roy Romer and Beatrice "Bea" Miller. He has four brothers and two sisters. One of his brothers, Chris Romer, is a former Colorado state senator.

He graduated in 1973 from Phillips Exeter Academy. He earned his Bachelor of Science in mathematics and a PhD in economics in 1983, both from the University of Chicago, after graduate studies at Massachusetts Institute of Technology from 1977 to 1979 and at Queen's University (Kingston, Canada) from 1979 to 1980.

== Career ==
Romer's most important work is in the field of economic growth, and he has made important contributions in the development of endogenous growth theory, and that ideas are non-rival. He was named one of America's 25 most influential people by Time magazine in 1997, and he was awarded the Horst Claus Recktenwald Prize in Economics in 2002. In 2015, he was recipient of the John R. Commons Award, given by the economics honor society Omicron Delta Epsilon.

=== Academia ===
Romer's research on economic growth followed extensive studies of long-run growth during the 1950s and 1960s. The Solow–Swan model, for example, established the primacy of technological progress in accounting for sustained increases in output per worker. His 1983 dissertation, supervised by José Scheinkman and Robert Lucas Jr., showed mathematical models of economies in which technological change resulted from intentional actions of people, such as research and development. It led to two Journal of Political Economy articles published in 1986 and 1990, which started endogenous growth theory.

Romer taught at the University of Rochester, the University of Chicago, the University of California, Berkeley, Stanford University and New York University. At New York University, he founded the Marron Institute of Urban Management, and was also the director of the Urbanization Project. Its objective is to assist cities in planning its future developments, specifically improving the safety, health, and mobility of citizens.

=== Business ===
Romer temporarily left academia in 2001 to found Aplia, a company founded in 2000 which produces online problem sets for college students. Students have submitted upwards of 2.4 billion answers to homework problems on the Aplia website. Aplia was purchased in 2007 by Cengage Learning.

He is credited with the quote "A crisis is a terrible thing to waste," which he said during a November 2004 venture-capitalist meeting in California. Although he was referring to the rapidly rising education levels in other countries compared to the United States, the quote became a rallying concept for economists and consultants looking for constructive opportunities amid the Great Recession.

=== Charter cities ===
Romer has attempted to replicate the success of charter cities and make them an engine of economic growth in developing countries. He coined and popularized the term in a TED talk in 2009, and he has argued that with better rules and institutions less developed nations can be set on a different and better trajectory for growth. In his model, a host country would turn responsibility for a charter city over to a more developed trustee nation, which would allow for new rules of governance to emerge. People could "vote with their feet" for or against these rules.

The government of Honduras considered creating charter cities (called Zone for Employment and Economic Development), though without the oversight of a third-party government, which some argue is neo-colonialism. Romer served as chair of a "transparency committee" but resigned in September 2012 when the Honduran government agency responsible for the project signed agreements with international developers without involvement of the committee.

=== Impact on Modern Technology and AI Economics ===
Romer’s endogenous growth framework has been recently applied to understand the economic dynamics of artificial intelligence and large scale digital infrastructure. According to the most recent analysis, Romer’s central idea of treating ideas as non-rival goods provides a useful explanation for the rapid expansion of AI investment and its long run economic effects.

According to this interpretation, large expenditures on computing hardware, data centers, and model training can be viewed as investments in the accumulation of new ideas and technological capabilities. Because ideas do not diminish with use, these investments produce spillover effects that increase productivity across firms and sectors. The analysis further suggests that while AI model development requires substantial fixed costs, the marginal cost of inference declines sharply with scale. This cost structure mirrors Romer’s emphasis on high initial investment followed by economy-wide benefits, implying that public or shared AI infrastructure could yield significant social returns through the diffusion of new knowledge.

=== World Bank ===
He became World Bank Chief Economist in October 2016. He resigned on January 24, 2018, following a controversy in which he stated in an interview with The Wall Street Journal on January 12, that during the tenure of Chile's socialist President Michelle Bachelet from 2014 onwards, Chile's ranking for ease of doing business had been downgraded by the World Bank as a result of changes of methodology which he claimed may have been politically motivated, a claim denied by the former World Bank economist responsible for compiling Chile's ranking, Chilean economist Augusto Lopez-Claros.

=== Nobel Memorial Prize in Economics ===
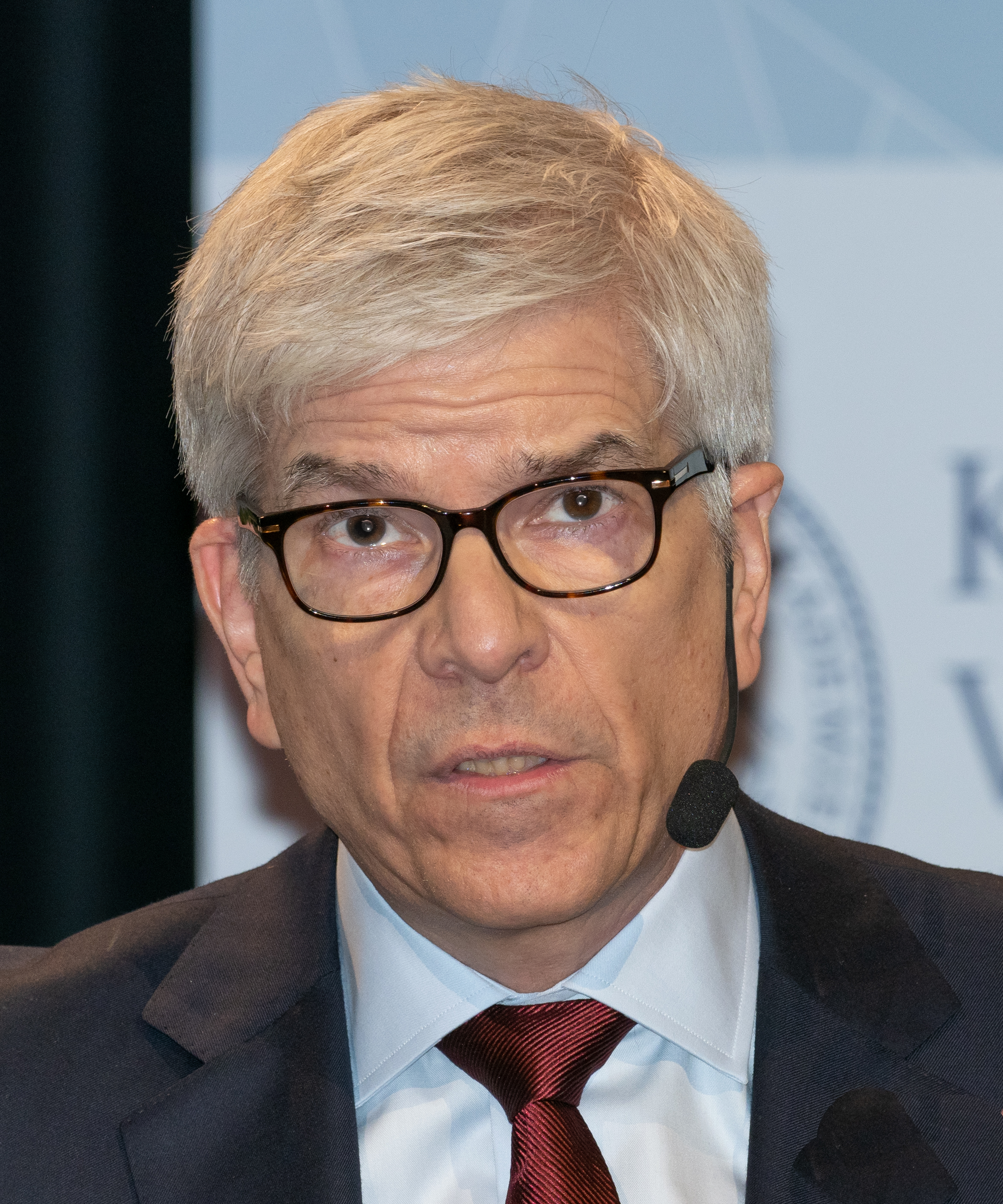
Paul Romer during Nobel press conference in Stockholm, December 2018

Romer shared the 2018 Prize with William Nordhaus. In choosing Romer as one of the 2018 economics laureates, the Royal Swedish Academy of Sciences stated that he had shown "how knowledge can function as a driver of long-term economic growth. . . . [Prior macroeconomic studies] had not modelled how economic decisions and market conditions determine the creation of new technologies. Paul Romer solved this problem by demonstrating how economic forces govern the willingness of firms to produce new ideas and innovations."

After receiving the prize, Romer described how he started thinking about the relationship between growth and innovation: "The question that I first asked was, why was progress . . . speeding up over time? It arises because of this special characteristic of an idea, which is if [a million people try] to discover something, if any one person finds it, everybody can use the idea."

The same day he received the award, Romer married Caroline Weber, a professor of French Literature at Barnard College.

== Publications ==
- "Growth Cycles", with George Evans and Seppo Honkapohja (American Economic Review, June 1998). JSTOR 116846
- "Preferences, Promises, and the Politics of Entitlement" (Individual and Social Responsibility: Child Care, Education, Medical Care, and Long-Term Care in America, Victor R. Fuchs (ed.), Chicago: University of Chicago Press, 1995).
- "New Goods, Old Theory, and the Welfare Costs of Trade Restrictions," Journal of Development Economics, No. 43 (1994), pp. 5–38.
- "Looting: The Economic Underworld of Bankruptcy for Profit" with George Akerlof (Brookings Papers on Economic Activity 2, William C. Brainard and George L. Perry (eds.), 1993, pp. 1–74). JSTOR 2534564
- "Economic Integration and Endogenous Growth," with Luis Rivera-Batiz (Quarterly Journal of Economics CVI, May 1991, pp. 531–55). JSTOR 2937946
- "Endogenous Technological Change" (Journal of Political Economy, October 1990). JSTOR 2937632
- "Increasing Returns and Long Run Growth" (Journal of Political Economy, October 1986). JSTOR 1833190
- "Cake Eating, Chattering and Jumps: Existence Results for Variational Problems" (Econometrica 54, July 1986, pp. 897–908). JSTOR 1912842

== Political views ==
In June 2024, 16 Nobel Prize in Economics laureates, including Romer, signed an open letter arguing that Donald Trump’s fiscal and trade policies coupled with efforts to limit the Federal Reserve's independence would reignite inflation in the United States.

== See also ==
- Endogenous growth theory
- Good governance
- Special economic zone
- Mathiness

Diplomatic posts
Preceded by Kaushik Basu	Chief Economist of the World Bank; 2016–2018	Succeeded by Shanta Devarajan; Acting
