= Martin Ravallion =

Australian economist (1952–2022)

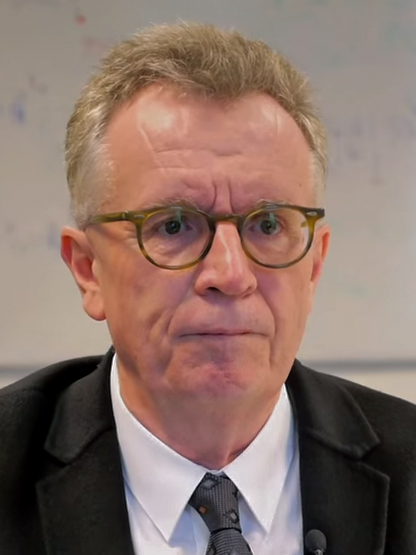
- Ravallion in 2016

Chief Economist of the World Bank
- Acting; June 2012 – October 2012
- President: Jim Yong Kim
- Preceded by: Justin Yifu Lin
- Succeeded by: Kaushik Basu

Personal details
- Born: 19 March 1952
- Died: 24 December 2022 (aged 70)
- Education: University of Sydney (BSc); London School of Economics (MSc, PhD)

Academic work
- Discipline: Development economics
- Institutions: Georgetown University
- Website: Information at IDEAS / RePEc

Martin Ravallion (19 March 1952 – 24 December 2022) was an Australian economist. He was the inaugural Edmond D. Villani Professor of Economics at Georgetown University, and had previously been director of the research department at the World Bank. He held a PhD in economics from the London School of Economics.

== Life and career ==
Ravallion researched extensively on poverty in developing countries and on policies for fighting poverty. In 1990 he proposed what has come to be known as the "$1 a day" poverty line, and since then he and his colleagues at the World Bank monitored progress against global poverty by this and other measures. A paper he wrote in 2012 became the basis of the World Bank, and subsequently United Nations, development goal of eliminating extreme poverty in the world by 2030. He advised numerous governments and international agencies, and wrote five books and 250 papers in scholarly journals, as well as editing several volumes. His book The Economics of Poverty: History, Measurement, and Policy was published by Oxford University Press in January 2016.

Based on publications and citations, Ravallion is regularly ranked in the top 10 development economists in the world and was ranked number 1 globally in the field of Development Economics by RePEc/IDEAS. He is ranked in the top 100 economists in all fields. He was a research associate of the National Bureau of Economic Research, a senior fellow of the Bureau for Research in Economic Analysis of Development, a non-resident fellow of the Center for Global Development, and ex-president of the society for the Study of Economic Inequality. In 2011 he received the John Kenneth Galbraith Award from the American Agricultural and Applied Economics Association. He won the 2015 BBVA Foundation Frontiers of Knowledge Award in Development Cooperation for his groundbreaking work on defining the extreme poverty threshold with internationally applicable standards that facilitate the establishment of specific development cooperation goals. In 2018 he was awarded an honorary doctorate in economics from the University of Fribourg, Switzerland.

Ravallion died on 24 December 2022, at the age of 70.

== Selected bibliography ==
=== Books ===
- Ravallion, Martin (1987). Markets and Famines. Oxford, England: Oxford University Press. ISBN 0198287275.
- Ravallion, Martin (1994). Poverty Comparisons. Chur, Switzerland Langhorne, Pennsylvania: Harwood Academic Publishers. ISBN 9783718654024.
- Ravallion, Martin; van de Walle, Dominique (2008). Land in transition: Reform and poverty in rural Vietnam. Washington D.C.: World Bank. ISBN 9780821372746.
- Ravallion, Martin; van de Walle, Dominique; Murgai, Rinku; Dutta, Puja (2014). Right to Work? Assessing India's Employment Guarantee Scheme in Bihar. Washington D.C.: World Bank. ISBN 9781464801303.
- Ravallion, Martin (2016). Economics of poverty: History, measurement and policy. New York: Oxford University Press. ISBN 9780190212766.

=== Chapters in books ===
- Ravallion, Martin (2008), "Evaluating Antipoverty Policies.", in Schultz, Paul; Strauss, John (eds.), Handbook of Development Economics Volume 4, North-Holland
- Ravallion, Martin (2009), "On the welfarist rationale for relative poverty lines", in Kanbur, Ravi; Basu, Kaushik (eds.), Arguments for a better world: essays in honor of Amartya Sen | Volume I: Ethics, welfare, and measurement, Oxford New York: Oxford University Press, pp. 375–396, ISBN 9780199239115
- Ravallion, Martin (2010), "Poverty and Inequality: The Global Context.", in Salverda, Wiemer; Nolan, Brian; Smeeding, Timothy (eds.), Oxford Handbook of the Economics of Inequality, Oxford University Press
- Ravallion, Martin (2013), "Poverty Lines across the World.", in Jefferson, Philip N. (ed.), Oxford Handbook of the Economics of Poverty, Oxford University Press
- Ravallion, Martin (2014), "Poor or Just Feeling Poor? On Using Subjective Data in Measuring Poverty.", in Clark, Andrew; Senik, Claudia (eds.), Happiness and Economic Growth, Oxford University Press
- Ravallion, Martin (2017), "Poverty is Good for Development", in Frey, Bruno; Iselin, David (eds.), Economic Ideas you should Forget, Springer

Diplomatic posts
Preceded by Justin Yifu Lin	Chief Economist of the World Bank; Acting; 2012	Succeeded by Kaushik Basu
