= A Decent Arrangement =

- Poster of A Decent Arrangement
- Directed by: Sarovar Banka
- Written by: Sarovar Banka
- Produced by: Sarovar Banka
- Starring: Shabana Azmi; Adam Laupus; Lethia Nall; Farid Currim; Shreya Sharma; Vikram Kapadia; Navniit Nisshan, Adhir Bhat
- Cinematography: Amol Rathod
- Edited by: Tom Quinn
- Music by: Neel Murgai
- Production company: Secret Pact Productions
- Distributed by: Manoj Nandwana (Jai Viratra Entertainment Limited)
- Release dates: 8 March 2011 (New York Indian Film Festival); 7 November 2014
- Country: India
- Language: English

A Decent Arrangement was released in India on 7 November 2014. This film stars Shabana Azmi, Adam Laupus, Lethia Nall, Farid Currim, Shreya Sharma, Vikram Kapadia, Navniit Nisshan, and Adhir Bhat. The film was directed by Sarovar Banka.

== Plot ==
A Decent Arrangement is the story of Ashok Khosla (Adam Laupus), an Indian-American copywriter who journeys to India seeking an arranged marriage. After he encounters an American woman travelling through India and is set up with an Indian woman who unexpectedly captivates him, Ashok must navigate the complexity of cultural traditions and the leanings of his own heart. With sharp comedy and true-to-life drama, A Decent Arrangement delivers an affecting story that resonates with those of us in search of our place in a changing world.

== Cast ==
- Shabana Azmi as Preeti Mehta
- Adam Laupus as Ashok Khosla
- Diksha Basu as Amita Chandra
- Lethia Nall as Lorie Sanders
- Farid Currim as Bashi Mehta
- Shreya Sharma as Suriya Mehta
- Vikram Kapadia as Arun Khosla
- Navneet Nishan as Gita Khosla
- Adhir Bhat as Vikram Kohli
