= Chief Economist of the World Bank =

Senior economist at the World Bank Group

The chief economist of the World Bank (full title: Senior Vice President for Development Economics and Chief Economist of the World Bank Group) is the senior economist at the World Bank Group, tasked with providing intellectual leadership and direction to the bank's overall international development strategy and economic research agenda, at global, regional and country levels.

As a member of the bank's senior management team, the person advises the president and bank's management on economic issues.

== List of chief economists of the World Bank ==
Name	Country	Term
Hollis B. Chenery	United States	1972–1982
Anne Osborn Krueger	United States	1982–1986
Stanley Fischer	United States	1988–1990
Larry Summers	United States	1991–1993
Michael Bruno	Israel	1993–1996
Joseph Stiglitz	United States	February 1997 – February 2000
Nicholas Stern	United Kingdom	July 2000 – 2003
François Bourguignon	France	2003–2007
Justin Yifu Lin	China	June 2008 – June 2012
Martin Ravallion; Acting	Australia	June 2012 – October 2012
Kaushik Basu	India	October 2012 – October 2016
Paul Romer	United States	October 2016 – 24 January 2018
Shanta Devarajan; Acting	Sri Lanka	24 January 2018 – 26 November 2018
Penny Goldberg	United States	26 November 2018 – 1 March 2020
Aart Kraay; Acting	Canada	1 March 2020 – 15 June 2020
Carmen Reinhart	United States	15 June 2020 – 30 June 2022
Aart Kraay; Acting	Canada	30 June 2022 – 1 September 2022
Indermit Gill	India	1 September 2022 – 16 September 2026
Michael Kremer	United States	16 September 2026 – present

== See also ==
- Chief Economist of the International Monetary Fund
