= Mathiness =

Economic misinformation based on distorted mathematics

Mathiness is a term coined by Nobel Prize–winning economist Paul Romer to label a specific misuse of mathematics in economic analyses. An author committed to the norms of science should use mathematical reasoning to clarify their analyses. By contrast, "mathiness" is not intended to clarify, but instead to mislead. According to Romer, some researchers use unrealistic assumptions and strained interpretations of their results in order to push an ideological agenda, and use a smokescreen of fancy mathematics to disguise their intentions.

== Introduction of the term ==
The first usage of the term was at the annual meeting of the American Economic Association in January 2015. Afterwards Paul Romer published his article Mathiness in the Theory of Economic Growth in the American Economic Review. The coinage mathiness follows the pattern of truthiness coined by comedian Stephen Colbert. Romer warns that mathiness is distorting economics:

Presenting a model is like doing a card trick. Everybody knows that there will be some sleight of hand. There is no intent to deceive because no one takes it seriously. Perhaps our norms will soon be like those in professional magic; it will be impolite, perhaps even an ethical breach, to reveal how someone’s trick works.

He specifically points to some work by Edward C. Prescott, Robert Lucas, Jr., and Ellen McGrattan, among others, and argues for a return to scientific rigor:

Economists have a collective stake in flushing mathiness out into the open. We will make faster scientific progress if we can continue to rely on the clarity and precision that math brings to our shared vocabulary.

Long before Romer, Hayek had condemned scientism, specifically in the form of the misuse of mathematics in social science, in his 1974 Nobel Prize acceptance speech on "The Pretence of Knowledge", and in his 1942 essay "Scientism and the Study of Society", later published as The Counter-Revolution of Science.

== Impact ==
Tim Harford draws a parallel to Politics and the English Language where George Orwell complained that politics prefers a rhetorical fog to the use of precise terms. Similarly the role of mathiness would be to hide unrealistic assumptions or pure hypothesis behind decorative math and therefore it is rather a case of politics than science.

Justin Fox notes that, in his book Misbehaving: The Making of Behavioral Economics, Richard Thaler documented how economists ignored real world phenomena because they did not fit into mainstream mathematical models.

J. Bradford DeLong argued that mathiness means "restricting your microfoundations in advance to guarantee a particular political result and hiding what you are doing in a blizzard of irrelevant and ungrounded algebra". He argues that this is what George Stigler did when he rejected the inclusion of monopolistic competition in his models because in his mind it was too intellectually dangerous. The notion of imperfect competition could give an opening to interventionist "planning" while being unaware of the magnitudes of potential government failure. Therefore, requiring that models assume perfect competition as a methodological principle was a "noble lie" to him. Paul Romer's problem is that he wants to analyze issues in which perfect competition is not leading forward but Prescott and Lucas are insisting on perfect competition as a methodological principle.

Paul Krugman thinks that the debate about drawing macroeconomic conclusions from the Great Recession is obstructed by the fact that there are economists, and whole departments that remain wholly dominated by mathiness.

== See also ==
- Begging the question
- Scientism
- Stylized fact
