= Indermit Gill =

Indian-American economist

Chief Economist of the World Bank
- Incumbent
- Assumed office 1 September 2022
- President: David Malpass; Ajay Banga
- Preceded by: Carmen Reinhart

Personal details
- Education: St. Stephen's College, Delhi (BA); Delhi School of Economics (MA); University of Chicago (PhD)

Indermit Gill is an Indian American economist who has worked on economic growth, poverty, institutions, conflict, and climate change. He is the World Bank Group's Chief Economist and also their Senior Vice President for Development Economics. He has previously worked at Duke University, the Brookings Institution, Georgetown University and the University of Chicago.

== Education ==
He completed his B.A. in economics from St. Stephen's College, Delhi in 1981, and M.A. in economics from Delhi School of Economics in 1983. His Ph.D. was awarded by the University of Chicago.

== Selected publications ==
- Gill, I. S., & Kharas, H. (2015). The middle-income trap turns ten. World Bank Policy Research Working Paper, (7403).
- Gill, I. S., Kharas, H. J., & Bhattasali, D. (2007). An East Asian renaissance: Ideas for economic growth. World Bank Publications.

Diplomatic posts
Preceded by Carmen Reinhart	Chief Economist of the World Bank; 2022–present	Incumbent
