= Aplia =

American educational technology company

Aplia Inc. is an educational technology company founded in 2000 by Stanford University professor Paul Romer. The company created teaching materials and other homework products available online to collegiate economic students.

Aplia was acquired in March 2007 by Cengage Learning (formerly Thomson Learning). Aplia was originally based in Belmont, California until March 2014, when it relocated to Cengage Learning's office in Mission Bay, San Francisco.

== History ==
In 1998, Paul Romer created an online experiment system for use in his economics courses at Stanford University so his students would come to class better prepared and become more engaged with the course material.

Romer decided to turn this system into a company and raised $10 million in venture capital to start Aplia, an online learning system.

Since 2000, Aplia has been used by over 4,300 professors, 1,200,000 students, at 1,300 colleges and universities worldwide and students have posted 2.4 billion answers, up from 200 million when Romer sold it. Initially, the learning platform only focused on economics, however, it was later used in accounting, business law, finance, statistics, and philosophy.

== Product ==
Romer's system was developed out of his belief that technology can be used to improve productivity in education. Aplia's basic product includes online homework assignments that professors can assign to students in accounting, business communication, business law, developmental reading, economics, finance, marketing, philosophy, statistics, and taxation. While the basic premise behind each course is the same, course materials vary; in many cases, Aplia problem sets are designed to complement specific textbook from a variety of publishers.

Research has also shown Aplia to be less effective in the classroom for students who require an in-depth relationship with the teacher. Studies are surfacing to find online learning to be another challenge that students must overcome in order to learn a subject they might be unfamiliar with. Some anecdotal evidence has been found that schools administration have found value in the micromanagement software features that Aplia offers, especially with keeping students on track with their assignments and increasing engagement and participation in the classroom.
