= George S. Tolley =

American economist (1925–2021)

- Born: November 18, 1925; Washington, D.C., U.S.
- Died: August 31, 2021 (aged 95)
- Spouse: Alice

Academic background
- Education: University of Chicago (MA, PhD 1955); American University (BA 1947)
- Influences: Theodore Schultz; D. Gale Johnson

Academic work
- Discipline: Agricultural economics; Resource economics
- School or tradition: Chicago school of economics
- Institutions: North Carolina State University (1955–66); University of Chicago (1966–present)
- Awards: Fellow of the American Association for the Advancement of Science (2003)

George Stanford Tolley (November 18, 1925 – August 31, 2021) was an agricultural economist at the University of Chicago. Along with the faculty at the University of Chicago, he has worked on the faculty of North Carolina State University. In 1965–1966, he was Director of the Economic Development Division of the Economic Research Service at the US Department of Agriculture, and in 1974–1975 he was Deputy Assistant Secretary and Director of the Office of Tax Analysis at the US Department of Treasury.

== Early life ==
Tolley was born November 18, 1925, in Washington, D.C., to Howard R. Tolley and Zora Frances Tolley. Howard was also an agricultural economist. In the 1920s, he worked in the USDA's Bureau of Agricultural Economics and in 1935 he returned to the Giannini Foundation at the University of California at Berkeley. In 1936, he returned to Washington and worked to reform the Agricultural Adjustment Administration and was chief of the Bureau of Agricultural Economics from 1936 to 1946.

George married Alice Welch, and they have one daughter, Catherine.

== Graduate school ==
Tolley graduated from American University with a bachelor in economics in 1947. Tolley received his MA and PhD from the University of Chicago, receiving his PhD in 1955. During that period, Chicago was a leader in agricultural economics under the leadership of Theodore Schultz and D. Gale Johnson, largely funded by the Rockefeller Foundation. Tolley's performance as a graduate student was very strong, and he was a major intellectual and administrative leader among the graduate students. He worked with a number of graduate students who became prominent in the field, particularly Robert L. Gustafson, Conrad Gislason, Cleon Harrell, Seymour Smidt, Hendrick Houthakker, Lester Telser, Clifford Hildreth, and F. G. Jarrett.

== Career ==
After graduating he moved to North Carolina State University as associate professor of agricultural economics from 1955 to 1966. In 1966, he returned to the University of Chicago as a full professor.

His work style was influenced by Schultz's valuing of testing and contesting ideas in workshops and with working papers. His questioning at workshops were gentle but probing, and he was considered a more relaxed audience member than many of his University of Chicago colleagues at research seminars.

In 1965-1966 he was Director of the Economic Development Division of the Economic Research Service at the US Department of Agriculture. He was Deputy Assistant Secretary and Director of the Office of Tax Analysis at the US Department of Treasury in 1974–1975. He has also served on the President's Task Force on Urban Renewal, the National Academy of Sciences Committee on Automotive Pollution, and the Energy Engineering Board at the National Research Council.

His research was broad reaching and included migration and agricultural policy, water allocation, water investments in depressed areas, international trade in agriculture and economic development, social costs and rural–urban balance, resource allocation effects of environmental policies, fiscal externalities and suburbanization, road capacity and city size, tax rates and national incomes, and freeing up transit markets. Between 1960 and 2000 he supervised 69 student PhD dissertations. Tolley died on August 31, 2021, at the age of 95.

== Honors ==
Tolley's research received a number of awards from the Agricultural & Applied Economics Association (formerly the American Farm Economics Association). In 1956, his doctoral dissertation, "Earnings of Labor and Capital in the Food Processing Industries", received the doctoral dissertation award. In 1961 and 1962 he received honorable mention for the Published Research Award for a pair of articles written with Loyal M. Hartman, "Inter-Area Relations in Agricultural Supply" and "Effects of Federal Acreage Controls on Costs and Techniques of Producing Flue-cured Tobacco". In 1964, he received the award with Raymond W. Gieseman for a paper titled "Consumer Demand Explained By Measurable Utility Changes".

Tolley was director of the Center for Urban Studies at the University of Chicago from 1978 to 1985. He founded the journal, Resource and Energy Economics.

Tolley was elected fellow of the American Association for the Advancement of Science in 2003. He was honorary editor of the journal, Resource and Energy Economics. He was also awarded an honorary Ph.D. from North Carolina State University in 2006.

== See also ==
- Chicago school of economics

== Bibliography ==
- George S. Tolley; Vinod Thomas; Chung Ming Wong (1982). Agricultural Price Policies and the Developing Countries. World Bank. ISBN 978-0-8018-2704-4.
- George S. Tolley; Philip E. Graves; John L. Garner (1979). Urban Growth Policy in a Market Economy. Academic Press. ISBN 978-0-12-692850-1.
- George Tolley; Donald Kenkel; Robert G. Fabian (November 1994). Valuing Health for Policy: An Economic Approach. University of Chicago Press. ISBN 978-0-226-80713-3.
