= Diksha Basu =

American writer and actress

- Born: Delhi, India
- Education: Cornell University
- Occupations: Writer, Actress
- Parents: Kaushik Basu (father); Alaka Basu (mother)

Diksha Basu is an American writer and actress. She is the author of the novel The Windfall which is under adaptation for a television series by Shonali Bose.

== Early life and education ==
Diksha Basu was born in Delhi, to the sociologist Alaka Malwade Basu and economist Kaushik Basu, who later became the Chief Economic Advisor to the Government of India and then the Chief Economist at the World Bank. She grew up in Delhi during the 1990s till the age of 10. When she was a teenager, she moved to Ithaca, New York with her family. Basu states that after moving to upstate New York, she would keep visiting Delhi every 4 to 6 months. She eventually graduated from Cornell University with a Bachelor of Arts in economics, and in the French language as part of a double major.

== Career ==
Basu In 2008, moved to Mumbai to pursue a career in acting, and lived in the city for four years. She featured in the comedy series Mumbai Calling (2007) and in the drama film A Decent Arrangement (2011). She began writing while in Mumbai, and her debut novel Opening Night was published by HarperCollins and launched in 2012 by Chetan Bhagat. The novel depicted the struggles of an American-born actor who moved to Mumbai to pursue a career in acting. It was described as a deeply personalised non autobiographical work of literary fiction.

Basu joined the Columbia University School of the Arts to attain a Master of Fine Arts in creative writing, from where she graduated in 2014. She also featured in the memory film A Million Rivers (2017). In the meantime, she married the music producer Mikey McCleary and gave birth to her daughter in 2017. Her second novel The Windfall was also published and launched in the same year, it was a humorous fiction marketed as a debut novel and depicted the life of a middle class Indian man who had suddenly encountered wealth. It received positive critical acclaim and was signed in for a deal to be adapted into a television series. According to ELLE magazine, it broke stereotypes of exoticism surrounding India while according to The Wire, it was a "shrewd and unstintingly funny story about the neuroses of New Delhi's 1%". The Hindu gave it a mixed review objecting at its lack of nuance and inaccuracies in social and cultural depictions.

In 2020, she published her third novel, Destination Wedding.

== Books ==
- Opening Night (2012)
- The Windfall (2017)
- Destination Wedding (2020)

== Filmography ==
Year	Title	Role	Notes
2007	Mumbai Calling	Call Centre Operator	Debut
2011	A Decent Arrangement	Amita Chandra	
2017	A Million Rivers		
