= D. Gale Johnson =

American economist

Academic background
- Doctoral advisor: Theodore Schultz

Academic work
- Doctoral students: Justin Yifu Lin

David Gale Johnson (July 10, 1916 – April 13, 2003) was an American economist and an expert on Russia and China. Among other notable contributions to economics, Johnson concluded that the strength of an industry depends on how the market works and not so much on government actions. Johnson was chairman of the department of economics at the University of Chicago and a member of the National Academy of Sciences. He was also a fellow of the American Agricultural Economics Association and the American Academy of Arts and Sciences. The New York Times called him "a pioneer in agricultural economics". The University of Chicago called him "one of the world's most eminent researchers of agricultural and development economics". The National Academies Press called him "a scholar of exceptional breadth who made original and important contributions to economics and to public policy".

Johnson received his PhD at Iowa State in 1945 under the supervision of Theodore Schultz. In the mid-1940s, a group of agricultural economists led by Schultz and Johnson moved to the University of Chicago. Johnson served as department chair from 1971 to 1975 and 1980-1984 and was president of the American Economics Association in 1999. Their research in farm and agricultural economics was widely influential and attracted funding from the Rockefeller Foundation to the agricultural economics program at the university. Among the graduate students and faculty affiliated with the pair in the 1940s and 1950s were Clifford Hardin, Zvi Griliches, Marc Nerlove, and George S. Tolley.

In 2000, he received the Quantrell Award.

== Bibliography ==
- David Gale Johnson (2016). World Agriculture in Disarray. Springer. ISBN 978-0333147023.
- David Gale Johnson (1974). The Sugar Program: Large Costs and small benefits. American Enterprise Institute for Public Policy Research. ISBN 978-0-8447-3126-1.
