= Picanol =

The Picanol Group is a diversified industrial group in the fields of mechanical engineering, agriculture, food, water management, and other industrial markets. The company is based in Ypres (Belgium), with production plants in Asia and Europe.

Picanol Group has been listed on Euronext Brussels since 1966 (ticker: PIC).

== History ==
The company was founded in 1936 by the Belgian industrialist Charles Steverlynck as Weefautomaten Picañol NV.

In 1966 the company was listed on the Brussels Stock Exchange. At the ITMA exhibition in Paris in 1971, Picañol exhibited the MDC, the world’s first electronically controlled flying shuttle machine. In 1989 the foundry division was split off from the other activities and made into a separate company, Proferro NV. In 1989 Picanol became part owner in what was then Protronic (now PsiControl). In 1993 Picanol achieved ISO 9001 certification. Verbrugge NV in Belgium and Steel Heddle Inc. in the USA were acquired in 2001. In 2003 among others Burcklé in France joined the group, while GTP Bandung was set up in Indonesia, GTP São Paulo in Brazil and GTP in Mexico.

In 2007, the company launched the new OptiMax-i and GT-Max rapier weaving machines and 2 years later, CEO Luc Tack made his entry. In 2012, Picanol Group opened a new headquarters in India and a new office for Picanol of America.

On the 25th of July 2013, SNPE SA and Picanol Group signed a binding agreement for the sale of a stake held by SNPE SA in Tessenderlo Group, representing 27.52% of the share capital of Tessenderlo Group. In 2015, Picanol Group celebrated the 40th anniversary of the production of rapier weaving machines with the global launch of its new OptiMax-i rapier machine. Picanol Group also launched two new weaving machines for the weaving of terrycloth: the TerryMax-i (rapier), and the TERRYplus Summum (airjet).

== See also ==
- Textile manufacturing terminology
