= Kaushik Basu =

Indian economist and academic (born 1952)

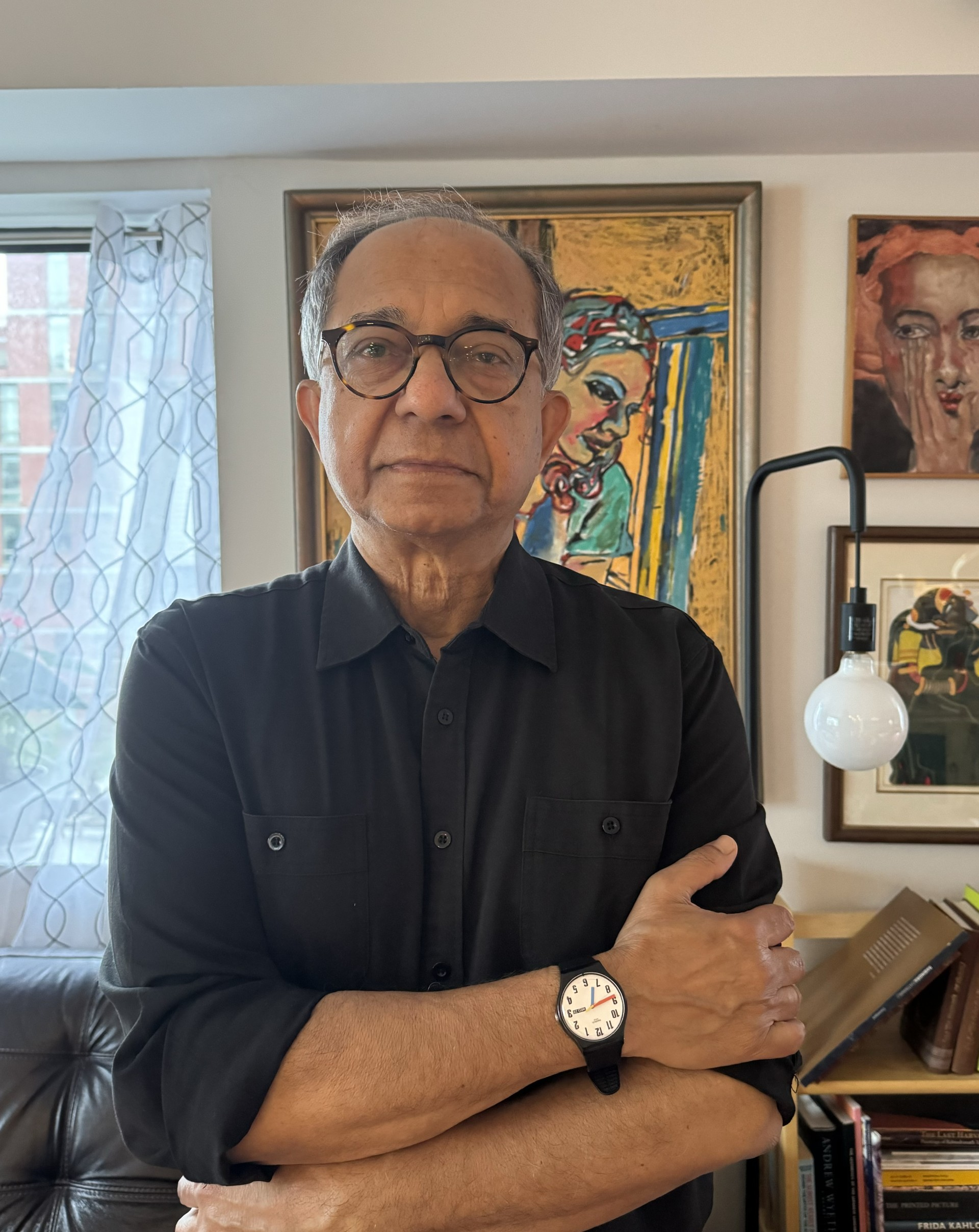
- Basu in New York

11th Chief Economist of the World Bank
- In office October 2012 – October 2016
- President: Jim Yong Kim
- Preceded by: Martin Ravallion (Acting)
- Succeeded by: Paul Romer

14th Chief Economic Advisor to the Government of India
- In office 2009–2012
- Prime Minister: Manmohan Singh
- Preceded by: Arvind Virmani
- Succeeded by: Raghuram Rajan

Personal details
- Born: 9 January 1952 (age 74) Kolkata, West Bengal, India
- Spouse: Alaka Malwade
- Education: University of Delhi (BA); London School of Economics (MSc, PhD)
- Website: Official website

Academic work
- Discipline: Macroeconomics
- Awards: Padma Bhushan (2008); Humboldt Prize (2021)
- Website: Information at IDEAS / RePEc

Kaushik Basu (born 9 January 1952) is an Indian economist who was Chief Economist of the World Bank from 2012 to 2016 and Chief Economic Adviser to the Government of India from 2009 to 2012. He is the C. Marks Professor of International Studies and Professor of Economics at Cornell University, and academic advisory board member of upcoming Plaksha University. He began a three-year term as president of the International Economic Association in June 2017. From 2009 to 2012, during the United Progressive Alliance's second term, Basu served as the Chief Economic Adviser to the Government of India. Basu is winner of the Humboldt Research Award 2021.

== Early life and education ==
Kaushik Basu was born in Kolkata, India, where he attended St. Xavier's Collegiate School. In an autobiographical essay he noted that finishing school in 1969 that his father wanted him to study physics, but in revolutionary times he wanted to study nothing. They settled on economics as a compromise. In 1969 he moved to Delhi to do his undergraduate studies in Economics, from St. Stephen's College. He then attended London School of Economics and was awarded MSc in economics from University of London in 1974. After earning his master's degree, Basu was supposed to move to England to study law and take over his father's legal practice, but he had fallen in love with the concept of logic and deductive reasoning and became fascinated by Amartya Sen's work. He remained at the London School of Economics, University of London for his PhD, from 1974 to 1976. He completed his PhD at University of London under the tutelage of Amartya Sen. He has received honorary doctorates from Lucknow University, Lucknow, in 2011, Assam University, Silchar, in 2012, Fordham University, US in 2013, Indian Institute of Technology Bombay, in 2013, University of Bath, UK in 2016, on the occasion of the university's fiftieth anniversary, and the Jadavpur University Kolkata in 2018.

Basu's childhood interest in Euclidean geometry found expression and drew attention when he was Chief Economist of the World Bank and published a paper giving a new proof of the Pythagoras theorem, via a property of isosceles triangles.

== Career ==
Basu has held visiting professorships at the Massachusetts Institute of Technology, Harvard University, the Institute for Advanced Study in Princeton, New Jersey, the Université catholique de Louvain's Center for Operations Research and Econometrics (CORE) in Louvain-la-Neuve, Belgium, and the London School of Economics, where he was a distinguished visitor in 1993. Additionally, he was a visiting scientist at the Indian Statistical Institute, a public university in Kolkata.

Basu was the Chief Economic Adviser to India's Ministry of Finance while on leave from Cornell University where he is Professor of Economics and the C. Marks Professor of International Studies. A Fellow of the Econometric Society and recipient of the Mahalanobis Memorial Medal, Basu has published scientific papers in development economics, game theory, industrial organisation, political economy, the economics of child labour, and crafted the traveller's dilemma.

In 1992 he founded the Centre for Development Economics at the Delhi School of Economics, and served as its first executive director until 1996.

Basu is a columnist for BBC News Online, the Hindustan Times, Business Standard and is the author of several books on economics and a play, Crossings at Benaras Junction, which was published in The Little Magazine (vol. 6, 2005). He is the editor of the Oxford Companion to Economics in India, published by Oxford University Press (February 2007), a compendium on the Indian economy.

On 5 September 2012, he was appointed Chief Economist at the World Bank.

Basu was the president of the Human Development and capabilities association founded by Amartya Sen. He is the editor of Social Choice and Welfare, associate editor of Japanese Economic Review, and is on the board of editors of the World Bank Economic Review. He was elected to take over as president of the International Economic Association in June 2017, for a three-year term.

Basu is the motivation behind Arthapedia, an online portal that provides explanations to the concepts used in Indian public policy to assist its understanding among citizens. He created Dui-doku, a competitive two-player version of Sudoku.

While working at the World Bank, Basu also taught courses on game theory at the George Washington University in Washington, D.C. He writes monthly columns for Project Syndicate.

He has been on the Social Sciences jury for the Infosys Prize from 2011, serving as Jury Chair from 2012.

Basu teaches at Cornell University, where he has a joint appointment as an economics professor in the Department of Economics and the SC Johnson College of Business.

=== Economic and political views ===
Basu has written on the importance of Adam Smith's identification of the invisible hand of the market and how that helps coordinate the self-interested behaviour of individuals to achieve order and optimality in an economy. He feels that this is such an unexpected finding that it led many traditional economists to overlook and then forget that moral qualities, like honesty, fairness, and integrity are critical for an economy to flourish. They are the nuts and bolts that enable the invisible hand to be effective. Basu also feels the need to promote quality thinking in government and public debate.

Basu has written in favour of Marx's ideal of a society where each person gets according to their need and gives according to their ability. He argues in his book, Beyond the Invisible Hand, that the fault lies not in the Marxist aspiration but in using the wrong blueprint to get to such an ideal. Some of the biggest blunders in history have been made from attempting to get to this ideal without a scientific roadmap. This is the reason why radical movements such as the one in the USSR began trying to build a humane, socialist society and ended up with crony capitalism. Basu has recently worked on our collective moral responsibility and the role that individuals play in fulfilling them.

=== Views on bribery ===
In his paper, 'Why, for a class of Bribes, the act of Giving Bribes should be treated as legal", Basu refers to certain bribes as 'Harassment Bribes' that are given to get what a person is legally entitled to such as a ration card or a passport. In such cases, only the act of taking a bribe should be illegal. This will cause a divergence in the interests of the bribe giver and taker and the bribe giver will be willing to co-operate to help the bribe taker get caught. This view has been under a lot of public debate.

== Personal life ==
Basu is married to Alaka Malwade Basu with two children.

== Awards and honours ==
- Padma Bhushan, Government of India, 2008
- Doctorate of Humane Letters, Fordham University, 2013
- Honorary Doctorate of Laws, University of Bath, 2016
- Alexander von Humboldt Foundation Research Award, 2021

== Selected bibliography ==
=== Books ===
- Basu, Kaushik (1980). Revealed preference of government. Cambridge University Press.
- Basu, Kaushik The Less Developed Economy: A Critique of Contemporary Theory, Basil Blackwell, 1984.
- Basu, Kaushik Agrarian Structure and Economic Development, Harwood Academic Publishers, 1990. This book is part of the series Fundamentals of Pure and Applied Economics edited by J. Lesourne and H. Sonnenschein.
- Basu, Kaushik. Economic Graffiti: Essays for Everyone. Oxford University Press. 1991
- Basu, Kaushik. Lectures in Industrial Organization Theory. Blackwell Publishers. 1992
- Basu, Kaushik; Nayak, Pulin Development Policy and Economic Theory, Oxford University Press, 1992.
- Basu, Kaushik; Majumdar, Mukul; Mitra, Tapan Capital, Investment and Development, Basil Blackwell, 1993.
- Basu, Kaushik Agrarian Questions, Oxford University Press, 1994.
- Basu, Kaushik; Suzumura, Kotaro; Pattanaik, Prasanta (1995). Choice, welfare, and development: a festschrift in honour of Amartya K. Sen. Oxford New York: Clarendon Press Oxford University Press. ISBN 9780198287896.
- Basu, Kaushik. Of People, Of Places: Sketches from an Economist's Notebook. Oxford University Press. 1994.
- Basu, Kaushik; Subrahmanyam, Sanjay Unravelling the Nation: Sectarian Conflict and India's Secular Identity, Penguin paperback, New Delhi, 1996.
- Basu, Kaushik Analytical Development Economics, The MIT Press, 1997, ISBN 0-262-02423-3.
- Basu, Kaushik. Prelude to Political Economy: A Study of the Social and Political Foundations of Economics. Oxford University Press. 2000.
- Basu, Kaushik Readings in Political Economy, Blackwell Publishing, 2003.
- Basu, Kaushik; Horn, Henrik; Roman, Lisa; Shapiro, Judith International Labor Standards, Blackwell Publishing, 2003.
- Basu, Kaushik India's Emerging Economy: Performance and Prospects in the 1990s and Beyond, The MIT Press, 2004, ISBN 0-262-02556-6.
- Basu, Kaushik (2005). Collected Papers in Theoretical Economics, Volume 1: Development, Markets, And Institutions. Oxford University Press. ISBN 0-19-566761-1.
- Basu, Kaushik. Collected Papers in Theoretical Economics, Volume 2: Rationality, Games And Strategic Behaviour. Oxford University Press. 2005.
- Basu, Kaushik Oxford Companion to Economics in India, Oxford University Press, forthcoming.
- Basu, Kaushik Beyond the Invisible Hand. Groundwork for a New Economics, Princeton University Press, 2010, Paperback, 2016. (French edition, 2017.)
- Basu, Kaushik An Economist's Miscellany, Oxford University Press, 2011
- The Republic of Beliefs. Princeton University Press. 2018. ISBN 9780691177687.
- Basu, Kaushik Policymaker's Journal: From New Delhi to Washington, D.C., Simon and Schuster, 2021

Non-profit organization positions
Preceded by Frances Stewart	President of the Human Development and Capability Association; 2010–2012	Succeeded by Tony Atkinson
Diplomatic posts
Preceded by Martin Ravallion; Acting	Chief Economist of the World Bank; 2012–2016	Succeeded by Paul Romer
