= Shanta Devarajan =

Economist

Shanta Devarajan சாந்தா தேவராயன்

Chief Economist of the World Bank Acting
- In office 24 January 2018 – 26 November 2018
- President: Jim Yong Kim
- Preceded by: Paul Romer
- Succeeded by: Penny Goldberg

Personal details
- Born: Jaffna, Sri Lanka
- Education: Princeton University (BA); University of California, Berkeley (MA, PhD)

Shanta Devarajan is Professor of the Practice of International Development at Georgetown University's Edmund A. Walsh School of Foreign Service. Prior to that, he was Senior Director for Development Economics (DEC) and a former Acting Chief Economist of the World Bank Group.

He previously served as Chief Economist of the World Bank’s Middle East and North Africa Region, Principal Economist and Research Manager for Public Economics in the Development Research Group, and the Chief Economist of the Human Development Network, the South Asia Region and Africa Region. He co-directed the World Development Report 2004.

Before 1991, he was a faculty member at Harvard University’s John F. Kennedy School of Government. His research covers public economics, natural resources and the environment, and general equilibrium modeling of developing countries, and he is the author or co-author of more than 150 publications.

== Selected works ==
- Ames, Brian, Ward Brown, Shanta Devarajan, and Alejandro Izquierdo. "Macroeconomic policy and poverty reduction." (2001).
- Devarajan, Shanta, Stuti Khemani, and Shekhar Shah. "The politics of partial decentralization." Does decentralization enhance service delivery and poverty reduction (2009): 102-121.
- Devarajan, Shanta, Jeffrey D. Lewis, and Sherman Robinson. "Getting the model right: The general equilibrium approach to adjustment policy." World Bank and International Food Policy Research Institute, Washington, DC Photocopy (1994).

Diplomatic posts
Preceded by Paul Romer	Chief Economist of the World Bank; Acting; 2018	Succeeded by Penny Goldberg
