= China Center for Economic Research =

Economics think tank in Beijing, China

The China Center for Economic Research (CCER) is an economics think tank in Peking University, China. It was opened in August 1994, and is directed by Justin Yifu Lin.

In 1998, it introduced the Beijing International MBA at Peking University, also known as BiMBA.
