= Development and Change =

- Discipline: Development studies, Social change
- Language: English
- Edited by: Ashwani Saith, Murat Arsel, Kees Biekart, Amrita Chhachhi, Bridget O'Laughlin, Servaas Storm

Publication details
- History: 1970-present
- Publisher: Wiley-Blackwell on behalf of the Institute of Social Studies.
- Frequency: Bimonthly
- Impact factor: 3.504 (2021)

Standard abbreviations
- ISO 4: Dev. Change

Indexing
- ISSN: 0012-155X (print); 1467-7660 (web)
- LCCN: 76018510
- OCLC no.: 781557999

Links
- Journal homepage; Online access; Online archive

Development and Change is a bimonthly peer-reviewed academic journal published by Wiley-Blackwell on behalf of the Institute of Social Studies. The journal was established in 1970 and covers development studies and social change. Specific topics of interest are international agencies, macroanalysis, non-governmental organizations, public policy, social structure, and sustainability. According to the Journal Citation Reports, the journal has a 2011 impact factor of 1.411, ranking it 15th out of 54 journals in the category "Planning and Development". The journal has a 2021 impact factor of 3.504 with and H-Index of 96.
