= Caroline Weber (writer) =

American author

- Born: 1969 (age 56–57)
- Spouse: Paul Romer (m. 2018)

Academic background
- Education: B.A., literature, 1991, Harvard University; MA, MPhil, PhD, French literature, 1998, Yale University
- Thesis: The limits of "saying everything": terrorist suppressions and unspeakable difference in Rousseau, Sade, Robespierre, Saint-Just, and Desmoulins (1998)

Academic work
- Discipline: Literature
- Institutions: University of Pennsylvania; Columbia University
- Main interests: Eighteenth Century French literature Cultural history
- Notable works: Proust's Duchess: How Three Celebrated Women Captured the Imagination of Fin-de-Siècle Paris; Queen of Fashion: What Marie Antoinette Wore to the Revolution

Caroline Elizabeth Weber (born 1969) is an American author. She is a professor of French and comparative literature at Barnard College within Columbia University. Her book Proust's Duchess was a finalist for the 2019 Pulitzer Prize for Biography or Autobiography.

== Early life and education ==
Weber was born in 1969. She received her Bachelor of Arts degree in literature (summa cum laude) from Harvard University and her PhD in French literature from Yale University.

== Career ==
After earning her PhD, Weber joined the faculty at the University of Pennsylvania as an assistant professor of Romance languages. While at the University of Pennsylvania, she authored Terror and its Discontents: Suspect Words and the French Revolution and co-edited Fragments of Revolution with Howard G. Lay.

After seven years at the University of Pennsylvania, Weber joined the faculty at Columbia University as a professor of French and comparative literature. While there, her book Queen of Fashion: What Marie-Antoinette Wore to the French Revolution was published in 2007 and described Marie Antoinette's life starting from her arrival from Austria into France. The biographical novel focused on Marie Antoinette's control over her image through her autonomy of fashion.

While conducting research for her book Proust's Duchess: How Three Celebrated Women Captured the Imagination of Fin-de-Siècle Paris, Weber discovered one unknown and one lost essay by Marcel Proust about Parisian high society. As she was sifting through Élisabeth Greffulhe's personal archive, Weber discovered an unfinished and unpublished essay by Proust from 1902 to 1903 titled "The Salon of the Comtesse Greffulhe." Greffulhe's husband had ordered her to not publish the essay for its vulgar contents, which she agreed to in fear of being beaten. Weber used these essays to trace the lives of three high-society female models for the Duchesse de Guermantes, from childhood to adulthood, in In Search of Lost Time, Proust's novel in seven volumes. Upon publishing the book, Weber was named a finalist for the 2019 Pulitzer Prize for Biography or Autobiography and received the 2019 French Heritage Society Literary Award.

== Personal life ==
Weber is married to economist Paul Romer. Their wedding occurred in 2018, the morning Romer accepted his Nobel Memorial Prize in Economic Sciences.
