= Central Statistics Office (India) =

Governmental agency in India. Merged with NSSO to make NSO

Agency Overview overview
- Formed: 2 May 1951
- Preceding agencies: Central Statistical Organization; Central Statistical Institute
- Jurisdiction: Government of India
- Headquarters: New delhi, India
- Minister responsible: Rao Inderjit Singh, Minister of Statistics and Programme Implementation
- Parent department: Ministry of Statistics and Programme Implementation
- Website: www.mospi.gov.in

The Central Statistics Office (CSO) is a governmental agency in India under the Ministry of Statistics and Programme Implementation responsible for co-ordination of statistical activities in India, and evolving and maintaining statistical standards. It has a Graphical Unit. The CSO is located in Delhi. Some portion of Industrial Statistics work pertaining to Annual Survey of industries is carried out in Calcutta. It deals with statistical data of different departments.

== Organisation ==
The CSO is headed by the Director-General who is assisted by five additional Director-Generals and four Deputy Director-Generals, six Joint Directors, seven special task officers, thirty deputy directors, 48 assistant directors and other supporting staff. The CSO is located in Delhi.

== Activities ==
The Central Statistics Office is responsible for co-ordination of statistical activities in the country, and evolving and maintaining statistical standards. Its activities include National Income Accounting; conduct of Annual Survey of Industries, Economic Censuses and its follow up surveys, compilation of Index of Industrial Production, as well as Consumer Price Indices for Urban Non-Manual Employees, Human Development Statistics, Gender Statistics, imparting training in Official Statistics, Five Year Plan work relating to Development of Statistics in the States and Union Territories; dissemination of statistical information, work relating to trade, energy, construction, and environment statistics, revision of National Industrial Classification, etc. It has two publications : 1. the statistical abstract- InIndia (annual) 2. the monthly abstract of Statistics

== Functions ==
The Central Statistics Office (CSO) in the Ministry of Statistics and Programme Implementation (MoS & PI) is responsible for the compilation of National Accounts Statistics (NAS). At the State level, State Directorates of Economy and Statistics (DESs) have the responsibility of compiling their State Domestic Product and other aggregates. It plays an advisory role in statistical matters It provides national statistics to UN It has set up a unit to attend to statistical work relating to the five-year plans in collaboration with the planning commission and has expanded training facilities for statistics personnel. It is also responsible for the compilation and publication of national income statistics. The CSO through its Industrial Statistical wing conducts the Annual Survey of Industries and publishes the result.

== History ==
The CSO was set up in the Cabinet Secretariat on 2 May 1951 as a part of the Cabinet Secretariat and having co-ordinating and advisory functions. At that time, the name of CSO was the Central Statistical Institute. In 1954 the CSI merged with CSO and the new name was the Central Statistical Organization. Recently, for a third time its name changed and now it called as Central Statistics Office.

== Fate ==
CSO was finally merged with NSSO to make National Statistical Office (NSO) in 2019 under the department of statistics in the Ministry of Statistics and Programme Implementation.

== See also ==
- List of national and international statistical services
