= Frank Donck =

Belgian businessman

Frank Donck is a Belgian businessman. He is a member of the business club De Warande and director of KBC Group. He is a son of Jef Donck, who owned Comelco, which was sold to Campina.

== Biography ==
He graduated from Ghent University as a licentiate in law and obtained a master's in finance from the Vlerick Leuven Gent Management School. He worked for Investco (part of KBC Group) as an investment banker and is a member of the board of the KBC Group, Zenitel, Greenyard Foods, Afinia Plastics, Telenet and Atenor. Frank Donck is also managing director of 3D and Ibervest (1987). In 2003, he was appointed Director of the KBC Bank and Insurance Holding Company.

== Early life and education ==
Donck was born in 1965 in Aalter, Belgium. He holds a master's degree in law from Ghent University and a master's degree in financial management from the Vlerick Business School. Since 1998 he has been managing director of 3D NV, his family's investment company, and of Ibervest NV.

== Career ==
Donck began his career as an investment manager at Investco NV (later KBC Private Equity NV), where he was a fund manager from 1989 to 1998.

=== Telenet ===
Donck had been a director of the Telenet group since its founding in 1996. When Telenet's shareholdings were rearranged, its board appointed him as its new chairman. At that time he was also chairman and managing director of Afinia Plastics, chairman of the board of Zenitel, and a director of Atenor, KBC Bank & Insurance Holding and several unlisted companies, and he served as the alderman for finance and public utilities (Schepen van Financiën en Regies) of the city of Aalst.

=== Current roles ===
Donck is chairman of Atenor and an independent director of Barco and Luxempart, holds board mandates in several privately owned companies, and is a member of Belgium's Corporate Governance Commission. On the board of KBC Group he is a non-executive director and the representative of its core shareholders, and a member of its Risk and Compliance Committee.
