= Petia Topalova =

Petia Topalova is the Deputy Chief in the Emerging Economies Unit of the European Department of the International Monetary Fund and Mission Chief for the Slovak Republic. She is also a research economist with publications in development and trade economics.

== Career and education ==
She obtained her B.A. in Economics from Brandeis University, followed by a PhD in Economics from M.I.T. in 2005. She has spent most of her career at the IMF. She started at the research department, then moved to the Asia and Pacific Department and is currently a Mission Chief for the Slovak Republic, a role she occupies since 2019. She has also spent time at the John F. Kennedy School of Public Policy as Adjunct Lecturer in Public Policy from 2012 to 2014.

Nobel laureate Esther Duflo has argued that controversial finding in her early career were not accepted by the economics profession and that "she was forced to seek a career outside academia."

== Research ==
Her research focuses on poverty and inequality, international trade and development economics. She has focused on India but also on Italy and Europe more broadly. Her research was cited over 10,000 times and she is the 110th most cited woman in economics according to RePEc/IDEAS. Her research was published in the Quarterly Journal of Economics, the American Economic Journal: Applied Economics and the Journal of public Economics. She has done part of her research with Nobel laureate Esther Duflo.

Her work has shown that poverty reduction was slower in areas of India that were more exposed to trade. This meant that there is a need to compensate losers from globalization.

In another paper in the Quarterly Journal of Economics, she has also shown that prior exposure to women in politics is more likely for women in the future to be elected. In India after ten year of quotas "women are more likely to stand for, and win, elected positions in councils required to have a female chief councilor in the previous two elections".

Her research was quoted in the Wall Street Journal, Financial Times and The Economist.
