= Jan Coene =

Belgian businessman (born 1957)

- Born: 1957 (age 68–69)
- Education: Businessman
- Children: 2

Jan Hugo Isidoor Coene (born in 1957), is a Belgian businessman who fell in disgrace because of the Picanol Scandal.

As a young trainee, he joined Brown, Boveri & Cie (BBC) Workshops in Brussels. In 1988, BBC merged with ASEA, to become ABB Asea Brown Boveri. In 2001 he left ABB and became the CEO & Chairman of Picanol, a world-wide leader in textile machinery and related services.

In 2003, he became Chairman of Belgacom, the Belgian national telephone company which he led to an IPO, working closely with its owner, the Belgian Government.

In 2004, the press revealed the level of his incomes from Picanol. These incomes were judged greatly excessive by the press, considering the usual Belgian remunerations for the functions of upper management. The lack of transparency was also pointed out, in particular by company's minority shareholders. Facing growing criticism, Jan Coene was forced to resign from both Picanol and Belgacom in October 2004. He accepted to reimburse ten million euros to Picanol (which because of the height of the sums reserved for Jan Coene had become financially unhealthy) but kept 12 million.

The affair became a political issue in Belgium and a bill was introduced in Parliament (the "Picanol law") to force big companies to publish the remuneration of their upper management personnel.

In the meanwhile, the affair also shed another bad light on the Network of Vlerick-Boys, a circle of business men with low moral standards who all studied at the Vlerick Management School. Members of the circle include Jan Coene, Ronald Everaert, Luc Debruyckere and Louis Verbeke, who were all implied in scandals of greed, mismanagement and fraud (Lernout & Hauspie, Ter Beke, Picanol). The circle entertains business connections and helps its members to get in the direction committees of Belgian industry. As one of the only remaining "clean managers" Jan Coene was named president of the alumni of the Vlerick Management School. But he also had to quit presidency after the 2004 Picanol scandal.

Other of Jan Coene's professional activities include: Director and Board Member of various companies: Domo, Committee Koning Boudewijnstichting, Flanders, Federation of Flemish Enterprises, co-founder of BBE (Belgian Business for Europe), member of the World Economic Forum (since 2002), Chairman of Siveco Group SA, a company providing CMMS products worldwide.

Jan Coene is married with 2 children.
