= Theodore Schultz =

American economist and Nobel Laureate (1902–1998)

- Born: April 30, 1902; Arlington, South Dakota, U.S.
- Died: 26 February 1998 (aged 95); Evanston, Illinois, U.S.

Academic background
- Education: South Dakota State University (BS); University of Wisconsin-Madison (PhD)

Academic work
- Discipline: Agricultural economics
- School or tradition: Chicago school of economics
- Institutions: Iowa State University; University of Chicago
- Awards: Nobel Memorial Prize in Economic Sciences (1979)
- Website: Information at IDEAS / RePEc

Theodore William Schultz (/ʃʊlts/ SHUULTS; 30 April 1902 – 26 February 1998) was an American agricultural economist and chairman of the University of Chicago Department of Economics. Schultz rose to national prominence after winning the 1979 Nobel Memorial Prize in Economic Sciences.

== Early life and education ==
Theodore William Schultz was born on April 30, 1902, in a small town ten miles southeast of Badger, South Dakota, on a 560-acre farm. When Schultz was in the eighth grade, his father Henry decided to pull him out of attending Kingsbury County Schoolhouse. His father's view was that if his eldest son continued to get an education he would be less inclined to continue working on the farm. Schultz subsequently did not have any formal post-secondary education.

He eventually enrolled in the Agriculture College at South Dakota State, in a three-year program that met for four months a year during the winter. After being recognized for possessing great potential as a student, Schultz moved on to a bachelor's program, earning his degree in 1927 in agriculture and economics. He also received an honorary doctorate of science degree from the college in 1959. He graduated in 1927, then entered the University of Wisconsin–Madison earning his doctorate in Agricultural Economics in 1930 under Benjamin H. Hibbard with a thesis, titled The Tariff in Relation to the Coarse-Feed Grains and a Development of Some of the Theoretical Aspects of Tariff Price Research.

== Academic career ==
Schultz taught at Iowa State College from 1930 to 1943. He left Iowa State in the wake of the "oleomargarine controversy", and he served as the chair of economics at the University of Chicago from 1946 to 1961. He became a member of the American Academy of Arts and Sciences in 1958, the American Philosophical Society in 1962, and the United States National Academy of Sciences in 1974. He became president of the American Economic Association in 1960. He retired in 1970 though he remained active at the University of Chicago into his 90s until a fractured hip left him bedridden.

Shortly after his move to Chicago, Schultz recruited his former student, D. Gale Johnson to the department. Their research in farm and agricultural economics was widely influential and attracted funding from the Rockefeller Foundation to the agricultural economics program at the university. Among the graduate students and faculty affiliated with the pair in the 1940s and 1950s were Clifford Hardin, Zvi Griliches, Marc Nerlove, and George S. Tolley. In 1979, Schultz was awarded the Nobel Prize in Economics for his work in human capital theory and economic development.

== Contribution to economic theory ==
=== Human capital theory ===
Schultz receiving Nobel Prize from King of Sweden Carl XVI Gustaf in 1979.

While he was chair of economics at Chicago he led research into why post-World War II Germany and Japan recovered, at almost miraculous speeds, from the widespread devastation. Contrast this with the United Kingdom which was still rationing food long after the war. His conclusion was that the speed of recovery was due to a healthy and highly educated population; education makes people productive and good health care keeps the education investment around and able to produce. One of his main contributions was later called Human Capital Theory, which he formulated with the help of Gary Becker and Jacob Mincer. Schultz coined this theory in his book titled Investment in Human Capital; however, he experienced negative feedback from other economists. He states that knowledge and skill are a form of capital, and investments in human capital leads to an increase in both economic output and workers' earnings. Many economists refused to support his theory of considering humans as a form of capital due to slavery, which at the time was an understandable critique given the civil rights movements at this time. Schultz argues that his theory does not dismiss humanity but instead encourages individuals to invest in themselves. He advocates for humans to invest in their health, internal migration, and on-the-job training; however, he focuses on encouraging individuals to better their education in order to increase their level of productivity. He states that if people were to do these things, they would have many more opportunities available for them to better their economic situations.

He also inspired much work in international development in the 1980s, motivating investments in vocational and technical education by Bretton Woods system International Financial Institutions such as the International Monetary Fund and the World Bank. During his research Schultz got down to details and went out among the poor farming nations of Europe, talking to farmers and political leaders in small towns. He was "not afraid to get his shoes a little muddy." He noticed that the aid the United States sent in the form of food or money was not only of little help but actually harmful to such nations, as the farmers and agricultural producers within those nations were not able to compete with the free prices of the "aid" sent and therefore they were not able to sustain themselves or invest the money they made from crops back into the economy. He theorized that if the U.S. instead used its resources to help educate these rural producers and provide them with technology and innovations they would be more stable, productive and self-sustaining in the long run. This was another key part of his work "Investment in Human Capital".

=== Agricultural Development Theory ===
One of Theodore Schultz's major contributions to economic theory is his theory outlined in his book Transforming Traditional Agriculture which was published in 1964. This theory combats a popular thought at the time held among development economists that the unwillingness of farmers of poor underdeveloped countries to innovate and expand their agricultural sectors was an irrational decision. Schultz argued that the farmers in these poor underdeveloped countries are making the most rational decision to not innovate or expand the agricultural sector because of high taxes and artificially low agriculture prices set by their governments. Schultz stated that in these poor underdeveloped countries resources were already being perfectly allocated and agriculture was already efficient. Despite these two things farmers in these countries were still poor, so the only solution to this problem was the transformation of their traditional agriculture system. Schultz argued that the best change to make for these poor underdeveloped countries to make was to replace all old inputs with new more profitable inputs. He stated the best way to do this was with a market approach where farmers were left free to decide which changes in the factors of production would be made. With this approach they would be free to try out any new innovations in technology and change in crops they decide to grow in pursuit of profits with very limited government intervention.

=== Nobel Memorial Prize in Economic Sciences ===
Schultz was awarded the Nobel Prize jointly with Sir William Arthur Lewis in 1979 for his work in development economics, focusing on the economics of agriculture. He analyzed the role of agriculture within the economy, and his work has had far reaching implications for industrialization policy, both in developing and developed nations. Schultz also promulgated the idea of educational capital, an offshoot of the concept of human capital, relating specifically to the investments made in education.

== Family and personal life ==
Schultz married Esther Florence Werth (1905–1991) in 1930. She was born and raised on a farm near Frankfort, South Dakota, of German parents, who encouraged her to pursue schooling. Werth was the first in her family to attend college, receiving a bachelor's degree in commercial science from South Dakota State College in Brookings in 1927, and subsequently worked as a school teacher in Waubay, South Dakota, from 1927 to 1929 and then in Gregory, South Dakota, from 1929 to 1930. Werth shared Schultz's background in agriculture and commitment to ideals of education and economic development, and throughout his career worked as a primary editor of his published works. In his Nobel Prize Lecture, he acknowledged her contributions thus: "I am also indebted to my wife, Esther Schultz, for her insistence that what I thought was stated clearly was not clear enough." The couple was survived by two daughters and one son.

== Legacy ==
Schultz received eight honorary degrees in his career. He had the distinction of being the first South Dakota State University graduate and the second South Dakotan to win a Nobel Prize after Ernest Lawrence winner of the 1939 Nobel Prize for Physics. Between 2012 and 2013, South Dakota State University built the Theodore W. Schultz Hall, a residence hall for students pursuing degrees in agriculture. Schultz also was awarded the Francis A. Walker Medal in 1972, which is the highest award given out by the American Economic Association.

Schultz died in Evanston, Illinois, on February 26, 1998, at the age of 95. He is interred at Badger Cemetery in Badger, South Dakota.

== Quotes ==
The dominant social thought shapes the institutionalized order of society...and the malfunctioning of established institutions in turn alters social thought.

— Theodore W. Schultz (1977)

Farmers the world over, in dealing with costs, returns and risks, are calculating economic agents. Within their small, individual, allocative domain, they are fine-tuning entrepreneurs, tuning so subtly that many experts fail to recognize how efficient they are.

– Theodore W. Schultz (1980)

Most people in the world are poor. If we knew the economy of being poor, we would know much of the economics that really matter.

– Theodore W. Shhultz (1981)

== Articles ==
- Schultz, Theodore W. (1956). "Reflections on Agricultural Production, Output and Supply". Journal of Farm Economics. 38 (3): 748–762. doi:10.2307/1234459. JSTOR 1234459.
- Schultz, Theodore W. (1960). "Capital Formation by Education". Journal of Political Economy. 68 (6): 571–583. doi:10.1086/258393. JSTOR 1829945. S2CID 154572248.
- Schultz, Theodore W. (1961). "Investment in Human Capital". The American Economic Review. 51 (1): 1–17. JSTOR 1818907.

=== Books authored ===
- 1943. Redirecting Farm Policy, New York: Macmillan Company.
- 1945. Agriculture in an Unstable Economy, New York: McGraw-Hill.
- 1953. The Economic Organization of Agriculture, McGraw-Hill.
- 1963. The Economic Value of Education, New York: Columbia University Press.
- 1964. Transforming Traditional Agriculture, New Haven: Yale University Press.
- 1968.Economic Growth and Agriculture, New York: MacGraw-Hill.
- 1971. Investment in Human Capital: The Role of Education and of Research, New York: Free Press.
- 1972. Human Resources (Human Capital: Policy Issues and Research Opportunities), New York: National Bureau of Economic Research,
- 1981. Investing in People, University of California Press. Description and chapter-preview links.
- 1993. The Economics of Being Poor, Cambridge, Massachusetts, Blackwell Publishers
- 1993. Origins of Increasing Returns, Cambridge, Massachusetts, Blackwell Publishers

=== Books edited ===
- 1945. Food for the World, Chicago: University of Chicago Press.
- 1962. Investment in Human Beings, Chicago: University of Chicago Press.
- 1972. Investment in Education: Equity-Efficiency Quandary, Chicago: University of Chicago Press.
- 1973.New Economic Approaches to Fertility, Chicago: University of Chicago Press,
- 1974. Economics of the Family: Marriage, Children, and Human Capital, Chicago: University of Chicago Press.

Awards
Preceded by Herbert A. Simon	Laureate of the Nobel Memorial Prize in Economics; 1979; Served alongside: Sir Arthur Lewis	Succeeded by Lawrence Klein
