= Malaysia and the World Bank =

Malaysia-World Bank Relations

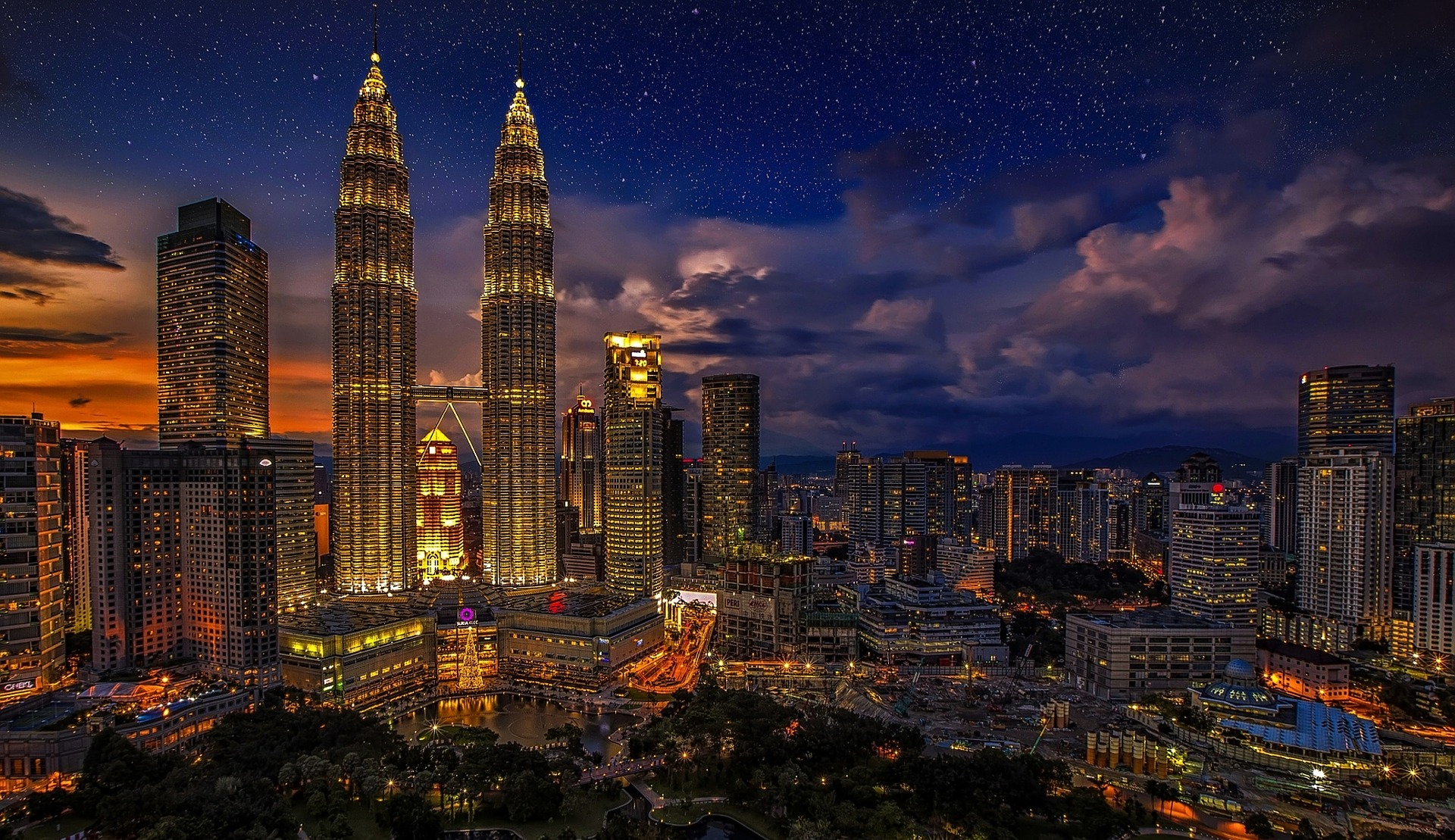
- Kuala Lumpur

- Malaysia in Southeast Asia
- Established: March 7, 1958; 68 years ago
- Type: World Bank Group Member
- Purpose: Economic & Financial Development
- Headquarters: Kuala Lumpur
- Services: Guide Financial and Economic Development

Malaysia's independence in 1957 was a catalyst for growth. As the nation took charge of managing its own affairs, it continued to develop the goals and means necessary for a financial structure conducive to the economic growth observed today. Critical to the transition of Malaysia from a low-income country to one of high-income status has been the expansion of its economy. From a commodity and agricultural-based economy, the Southeast Asian nation is transitioning to a leading exporter of more complex goods. As the nation opens up to trade and investment, the World Bank and the International Bank for Reconstruction and Development (IBRD) and International Development Association (IDA) continue to assist with its development.

== History with the World Bank ==
Malaysia joined the World Bank following its independence on March 7, 1958, following a resolution to first join the International Monetary Fund. The World Bank continues to identify areas of growth necessary for the Malaysian economy. It cites a need for reduce poverty, income inequalities. Although the growth of the Malaysian economy has been significant, it still trails relative to regional and national competitors of a similar nature. Many of Malaysia's loans from the World Bank have been concerned with infrastructure development relating to energy security and trade. As such, its first pivotal project was the creation of a hydroelectric power station and dam. Successive projects included funding allocating to the development of ports, roads, in tandem with the Ministry of Finance in Malaysia.

=== First Power Project for Malaysia ===
Malaysia received its first loan from the IBRD in 1958. The proposed loan expected the IBRD to provide 70% of financing, or around US$51.2 million. These funds were commissioned for the Cameron Highlands District, approximately 100 miles of Kuala Lumpur, as a part of a comprehensive plan to develop energy infrastructure. The hydroelectric power station created as a result of the loan channeled the several local waterways that flowed through the plateau-region. Project completion resulted in diversion tactics, new power stations, and a concrete damn. The project represented the needs greater power demand in the state.

=== 1990s ===
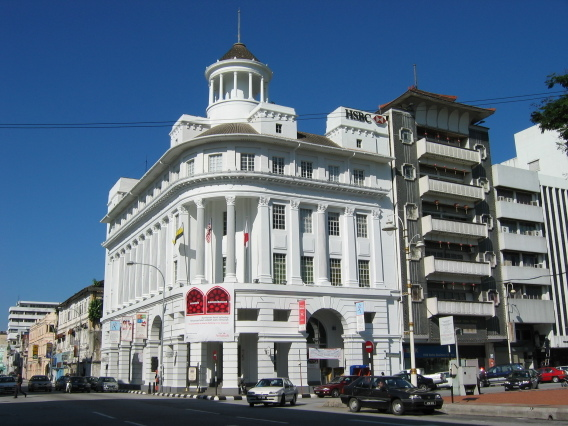
The first HSBC Bank Malaysia

Throughout the 1990s Malaysia continued to receive World Bank loans meant to assist the state's development and diversify the growth of its predominantly agricultural and commodity-based economy. Following its receipt and use of IBRD loans, Malaysia choose to seek relations via a reimbursable advisory services framework (RAS). Malaysia now interacts with the World Bank Group as an upper-middle income economy as a member of the IDA.

=== Asian Financial Crisis ===
Although Malaysia was afflicted by the 1997 Asian financial crisis, its economy bounced back with an average growth rate of 5.4% and is on a current upward trajectory. Malaysia's resilience to the financial crises and successive growth was attributed to the presence of well established foreign banks, among these HSBC and Standard Chartered. The presence of foreign banks allowed the state to develop comprehensive data sets regarding the local economy, to the benefit of Malaysian domestic banks. In tandem with the success of Malaysia post-crisis was the growth of physical capital stock. Policies in Malaysia continued to facilitate the flow of foreign direct investment and improved import relations with foreign states.

== The World Bank Group Inclusive Growth and Sustainable Finance Hub ==
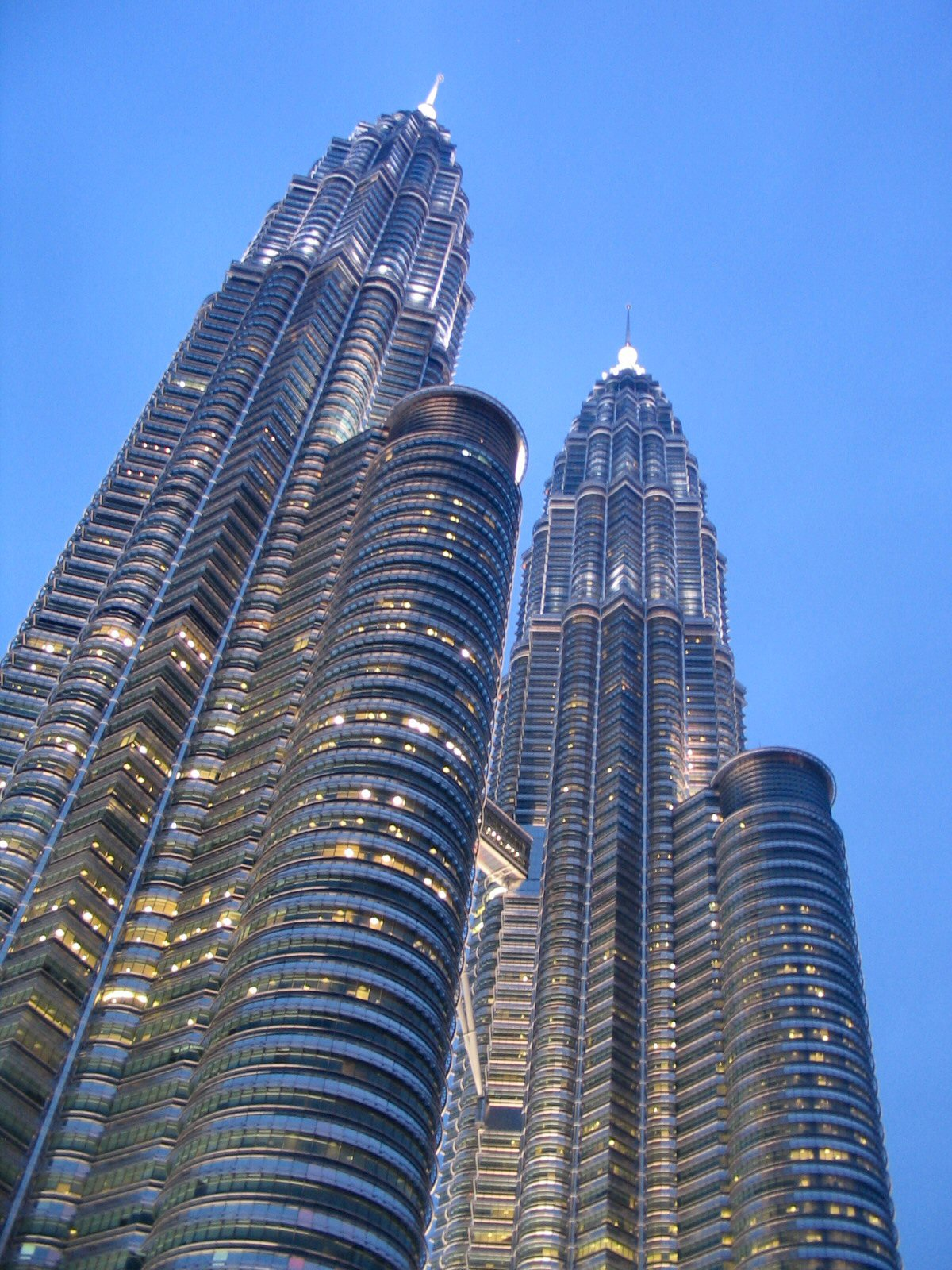
The Petronas Towers in Kuala Lumpur represent the growing prominence of the city as a financial hub.

The World Bank Group Inclusive Growth and Sustainable finance Hub in Kuala Lumpur anchors the WBG's presence. The Hub was established in 2016 and represents the first organization of its kind. Its focus is to disseminate knowledge Malaysians and regional neighbors can use to improve socioeconomic productivity. Creation of the office was underpinned by the sentiment that increasing the access to important information in the region would lead to greater economic growth. The organization works to share keys to Malaysia success with emerging and developing markets transitioning from poverty, to propagate development policy research in tandem with other research institutions and to guide Malaysia rise to a high-income economy. Costs of the Hub were agreed to be financed by Malaysian government over the course of a five year-term. The Hub is in its second term of its agreement. The Hub works in tandem with the Development Economics (DEC) Research Group and Indicators Group, also a part of the WBG.

The role of the Hub is information specific. It is meant to use information flow from external actors and its RASs along with information it sends out to understand labor market policy and public spending influences. The RASs are pivotal in providing infrastructure, transportation and public spending data.

=== New Financial Instruments ===
The creation of the green sukuk, or green Islamic bond, is an innovation catalyzed by the World Bank. The bond has identified as a Climate Finance tool for cities and low-carbon infrastructure projects meant to stimulate private sector investment. This innovation was particular significant given that green bonds appeal to both private and public sector actors. Green bonds are typically create to generate sustainable investment and as a prerequisite, projects must also be green. These bonds will typically incentivize the relevant stakeholders to utilize them, in contrast with use of regular bonds that my not offer the same lending terms. The creation of the sukuk expects to build on the growth of sustainable investment asset use in Malaysia and its near abroad.

=== Addressing Poverty ===
Less than 1% of the nation exists at extreme poverty. In addressing the state of poverty in Malaysia, the government has turned to the lower 40% tier who remain vulnerable to economic disturbance. Knowledge developed from the Hub is meant to address key concerns in these areas. Past studies map the ability of Malaysia's poor to transition to higher-income status. The New Economic Policy in Malaysia presented strategies meant to address economic growth. As a result, the poverty rate fell from 52.4% in 1970 to 3.8% in 2009. Malaysia seeks to address poverty at the micro-level and has produced a New Economic Model and framework in the Tenth Malaysia and Eleventh Malaysia Plans to address this.
