= Dilek Barlas =

Turkish lawyer and former Executive Secretary of the World Bank Inspection Panel

Dilek Barlas is a Turkish lawyer and international development specialist. She served as the Executive Secretary of the World Bank's Inspection Panel from 2014 to 2021, after previously serving as its deputy executive secretary from 2007. Before joining the Panel she worked as a senior counsel in the World Bank's Legal Vice Presidency for the Europe and Central Asia Region, and earlier held positions in the Turkish Undersecretariat of Treasury and Foreign Trade and the law firm White & Case.

Barlas holds a law degree from the University of Ankara and an LL.M. in international legal studies from the American University Washington College of Law. Since 2023 she has been an adjunct professor of law at the Georgetown University Law Center, co‑teaching a seminar on poverty reduction and accountability, while also serving as a consultant to multilateral development banks.

== Career ==
Barlas joined the World Bank in 1992 as a lawyer in its Legal Vice Presidency. She later served as senior counsel for the Europe and Central Asia Region, including a field assignment in Ankara, Turkey, from 2004 to 2006. In 2007 she became deputy executive secretary of the World Bank's Inspection Panel, and she was appointed executive secretary in 2014. In this role she managed the panel's secretariat, supported the panel members, and oversaw investigations into the Bank's compliance with environmental and social policies. After stepping down from the Panel in 2021, she became an independent consultant advising international development banks and accountability mechanisms.
