= World Bank Director-General Evaluation =

The World Bank Director-General Evaluation (DGE) oversees the work of three units of the Independent Evaluation Group (IEG): IEG-World Bank evaluates IBRD and IDA support to countries' overall development; IEG-IFC evaluates Bank Group activities that focus on contributions to private sector development and on strengthening the business climate; and IEG-MIGA evaluates the impact of Bank Group political risk guarantees and technical assistance aimed at improving foreign direct investment to developing countries. These three units, under the overall guidance of the Director-General, disseminate their findings with the aim of enhancing the Bank Group's development effectiveness. The Director-General also works closely with development partners to foster international evaluation harmonization, strengthen evaluation capacity in developing countries, and encourage evaluations of the international development system.

This position is currently held by Caroline Heider as of October 2011.

== List of World Bank Director-Generals of Evaluation ==
- Christopher Willoughby, Successively Unit Chief, Division Chief, and Department Director for Operations Evaluation - 1970–1976
- Mervyn L. Weiner, First Director-General, Operations Evaluation - 1975–1984
- Yves Rovani, Director-General, Operations Evaluation - 1986–1992
- Robert Picciotto, Director-General, Operations Evaluation - 1992–2002
- Gregory K. Ingram, Director-General, Operations Evaluation - 2002–2005
- Vinod Thomas Director-General, Evaluation - 2005-2011
- Caroline Heider, Director-General, Evaluation - 2011-present

== See also ==
- World Bank
- Independent Evaluation Group
