= The Parliamentary Network on the World Bank & International Monetary Fund =

Parliamentary Network on the World Bank & International Monetary Fund
- International Secretariat: Paris
- Official languages: English; French

Leaders
  - Chairman: (United Kingdom) Liam Byrne
  - Vice-Chair: (Jamaica) Marlene Malahoo Forte
  - Treasurer: (Ghana) Collins Adomako-Mensah
  - Member: (Ivory Coast) Madjara Tiegbana Coulibaly
  - Member: (Morocco) Neila Tazi
  - Member: (Nepal) Gagan Thapa
  - Member: (Tanzania) Neema Lugangira
  - Member: (Luxembourg) Sven Clement
  - Member: (Spain) Esther del Brío
  - Member: (Pakistan) Faisal Saleem Rahman
- Website parlnet.org

The Parliamentary Network on the World Bank & International Monetary Fund (French: Réseau parlementaire sur la Banque mondiale et le FMI) is an independent inter-parliamentary organization aiming to increase transparency and accountability in international financial institutions., notably the World Bank Group and the International Monetary Fund (IMF). It consists of over a thousand legislators from 158 World Bank Group and IMF member countries.

== History ==
The Parliamentary Network on the World Bank & IMF was founded in 2000 as an independent, non-governmental organization providing a platform for advocacy for Parliamentarians from IMF and World Bank member countries;. The Network has formed partnerships with numerous organizations, including: the World Bank, the IMF, the OECD, the Inter-Parliamentary Union, GOPAC, GLOBE, Transparency International, etc.

== Structure and governance ==
The Parliamentary Network is governed by the Board of Directors currently composed of 10 members elected every two years. The members of the Board represent the regions of MENA, Europe, Africa, Latin America, East Asia, and World Bank donor countries. Membership in the Network is open to all elected or nominated parliamentarians from World Bank and IMF member states who currently hold a mandate.

The International Secretariat of the Network is based in Paris, France.

== Objectives ==
The Parliamentary Network on the World Bank & IMF is principally focused on increasing transparency and accountability of the World Bank Group and the International Monetary Fund by:

- Strengthening the understanding of the work of the World Bank Group and International Monetary Fund among parliamentarians
- Providing a channel for parliamentarians to inform the World Bank Group and IMF of legislative priorities on behalf of their constituents
- Ensuring that the voice of parliamentarians is heard on the subjects in which the WBG and IMF have a key role
- Conducting research and share information among members on topics which are of international concern and interest

== Activities ==
=== Global Parliamentary Forum (GPF) ===
Twice a year, the Parliamentary Network on the World Bank & IMF organizes, jointly with the World Bank Group and the International Monetary Fund, the Global Parliamentary Forum. The conference brings together legislators, the IMF, and World Bank leadership.

Year	City	Country
2024	Washington DC	United States
2024	Washington DC	United States
2023	Washington DC	United States
2023	Marrakech	Morocco
2022	Washington DC	United States
2022	Washington DC	United States
2021	Remote	
2020	Remote	
2019	Washington DC	United States
2018	Washington DC	United States
2017	Washington DC	United States
2016	Washington DC	United States
2015	Washington DC	United States
2013	Baku	Azerbaijan
2010	Brussels	Belgium
2008	Paris	France
2007	Cape Town	South Africa
2005	Helsinki	Finland
2004	Paris	France
2003	Athens	Greece
2002	Bern	Switzerland
2001	London	United Kingdom
2000	The Hague	The Netherlands

=== Field Visits ===
The Parliamentary Network organizes visits for parliamentarians to on-the-ground development projects supported by the World Bank and the IMF. To this day, its members have participated in visits to Albania, Burkina Faso, Burundi, Cambodia, Côte d'Ivoire, the Democratic Republic of the Congo, Ethiopia, Ghana, Haiti, Indonesia, Kenya, Laos, Madagascar, Mongolia, Montenegro, Mozambique, Nicaragua, Nigeria, Peru, Rwanda, Serbia, Sri Lanka, Tanzania, Uganda, Vietnam and Yemen.

=== Chapters ===
National and regional chapters are parliamentary discussion groups organized by a local initiative which aim to strengthen the position of parliamentarians among international financial institutions and other development stakeholders and facilitate regular interaction between local and regional legislators and staff in World Bank and IMF country offices, including consultations on Country Assistance Strategies, Public Expenditure Reviews, World Bank and IMF policies and programmes

=== Special events ===
The Parliamentary Network regularly participates in a number of special events including global summits, parliamentary assembly caucuses and economic briefing sessions.
