= World Bank's Inspection Panel =

Inspection Panel
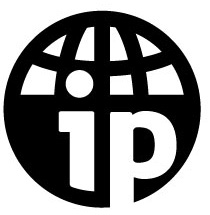
- Logo
- Abbreviation: IPN
- Formation: 22 September 1993
- Type: Independent accountability mechanism
- Location: Washington, DC
- Members: Imrana Jalal (Chair), Jan Mattsson, Ramanie Kunanayagam
- Parent organization: IDA, IBRD
- Website: http://www.inspectionpanel.org/

The Inspection Panel is an independent accountability mechanism of the World Bank. It was established in September 1993 by the World Bank Board of Directors, and started operations on August 1, 1994. The Panel provides a forum for people who believe that they may be adversely affected by Bank-financed operations to bring their concerns to the highest decision-making levels of the World Bank. The Panel determines whether the Bank is complying with its own policies and procedures, which are designed to ensure that Bank-financed operations provide social and environmental benefits and avoid harm to people and the environment. The Inspection Panel was the first body to promote accountability among international financial institutions through this community-led, or “bottom-up”, approach which is complementary to the “top-down” forms of accountability, such as evaluation initiated by the World Bank itself. Building on this example, other multilateral and regional financial institutions have established similar accountability mechanisms as part of broader efforts at sustainable and equitable development.

== Mandate ==
The Inspection Panel's mandate allows it to investigate projects funded by the IDA and IBRD, both part of the World Bank Group, and to determine whether they are complying with their policies and procedures in the design, appraisal, and implementation of a project. These policies and procedures are not limited to the Bank's social and environmental safeguard policies, but include other operational policies, bank procedures, and operational directives, as well as other Bank procedural documents.

== Operation ==
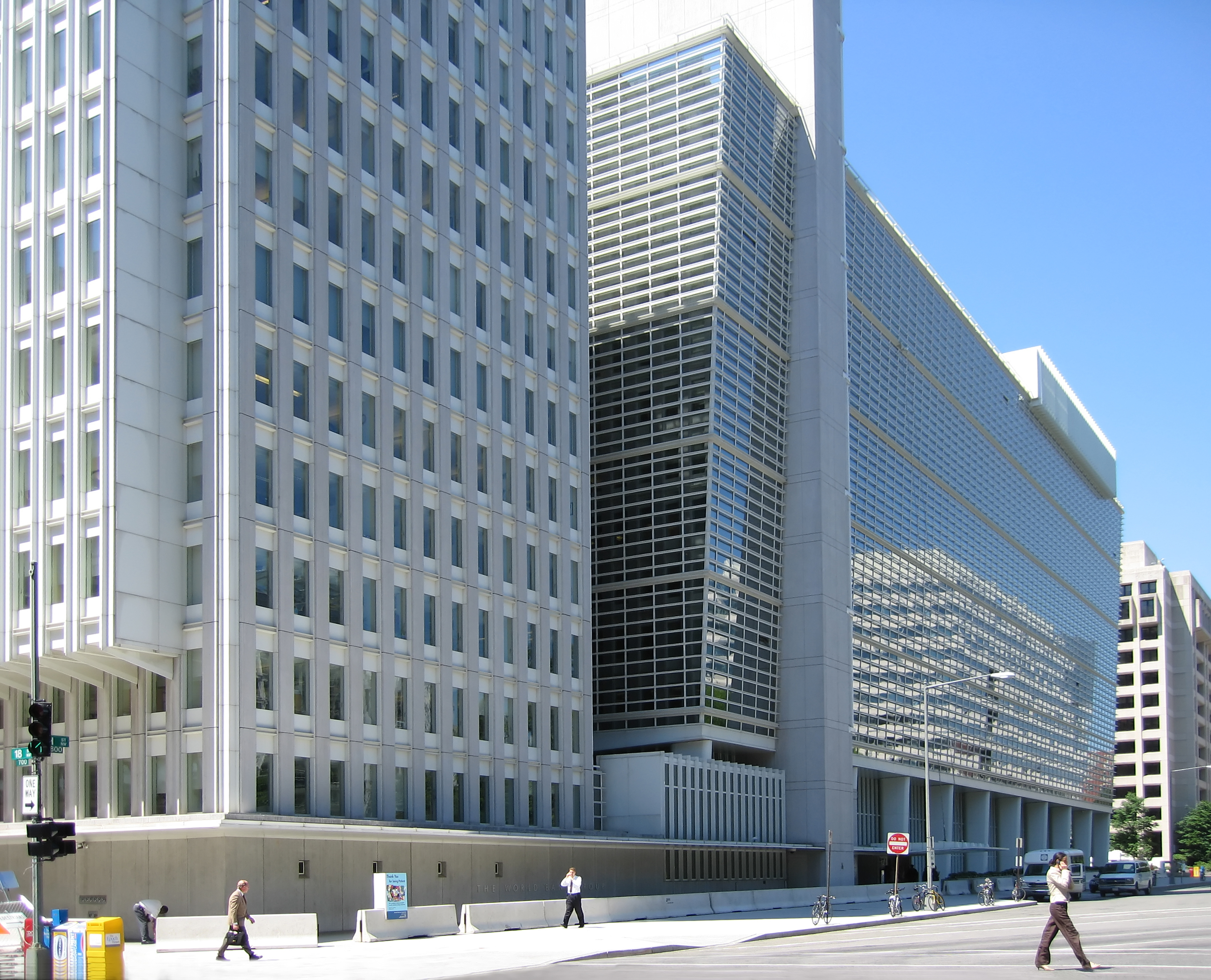
The World Bank & Inspection Panel's headquarters in Washington, D.C.

=== Organization ===
The Inspection Panel c onsists of three members who are appointed by the Board of Directors for non-renewable periods of five years. In addition, an Executive Secretariat was established to assist and support all Panel activities. The Panel is independent of Bank management and is provided with independent resources to discharge its functions.

=== Process ===
The Panel process begins when it receives a request for inspection from a party of two or more Requesters, claiming that the Bank has violated its policies and procedures. Most requests concern some of the Bank's safeguard policies, such as the policies on environmental assessment, involuntary resettlement, or indigenous people.

Once the Panel has received and registered a request for inspection, the eligibility phase of the Inspection Process commences. Beginning on the day of registration the World Bank's management has 21 days to provide the Panel with evidence that it complied or intended to comply with the Bank's relevant policies and procedures. After receiving management's response, the Panel has 21 business days to determine the eligibility of the request.

Once it has been determined that the eligibility criteria have been met, and after having reviewed the management response to the request, the Panel may, taking other factors it may have discovered during a field visit into consideration, make a recommendation to investigate. In some cases, the Panel has promoted problem solving between management and the requesters to help mediate less contentious cases and lead to an earlier resolution of community concerns or policy compliance problems.

An investigation is not automatic, and can only be authorized by the Board of Executive Directors. If the Board approves, the next step is the substantive phase of the inspection process when the Panel evaluates the merits of the request. In the investigation phase, the Panel is focused on fact finding and verification. It visits the borrowing country and meets with the requesters and other affected people, as well as with a broad array of people from whom it can learn in detail about the issues, concerns, the project's status, and potential harmful effects. The investigation phase may take a few months, or longer, in complex cases.

Once the investigation phase is complete, the Panel submits its Investigation Report to Bank management. The Board meets to consider both the Panel's Investigation Report and management's recommendations, before deciding whether to approve the recommendations. The Board may ask the Panel to check whether management has made appropriate consultations about the remedial measures with the affected people.

== History ==
During the 1980s the Bank had begun developing and committing itself to operational policies and procedures, including policies on involuntary resettlement (1980), tribal peoples (1982), and environmental assessment (1988). In the late 1980s and early 1990s, however, widespread voices of concern and protest from civil society and project-affected communities questioned the social and environmental impacts of Bank-financed operations. A central element of this critique was that the Bank was not complying with its policy commitments which it had adopted to prevent these very types of adverse social and environmental impacts. Serious debates on these issues also took place within the Bank's member governments and the Bank itself.

In June 1992, the international community gathered at the United Nations Conference on Environment and Development in Rio de Janeiro to chart a new cooperative approach to addressing interrelated issues of social development, economic development, and environmental protection. The blueprint for the creation of the Inspection Panel was developed in this larger context as a result of efforts from civil society, governments, and members of the Bank's Board to establish a new and independent mechanism for greater accountability, participation, and transparency at the World Bank.

The Panel marked its 25th anniversary in 2018.

=== Creation ===
The Panel was officially created by two similar resolutions of the International Bank for Reconstruction and Development (IBRD) and the International Development Agency (IDA) signed by the Board of Executive Directors on September 1, 1993 (Resolution IBRD 93–10 and Resolution IDA 93–6). The Resolution specifies that the Panel has jurisdiction with respect to operations supported by the IBRD and the IDA. In 1996 and 1999, clarifications were added to the Resolution.

The five independent oversight and accountability functions of the World Bank Group are:

- The Independent Evaluation Group (IEG), whose Director-General reports directly to the Bank Group's Board of Executive Directors.
- The Inspection Panel (IPN). Its three members are appointed by the Board of Directors, and independent of Bank Management.
- The Institutional Integrity Vice Presidency (INT), whose VP reports to the World Bank's President. The Independent Advisory Board provides advice to the World Bank Group on governance and anti-corruption measures, helps protect the independence and strengthens the accountability of INT by giving advice on policies and procedures and on the department's interactions within the World Bank Group. It also provides advice to President Robert Zoellick and the World Bank Group Audit Committee on the performance of INT.
- The Group Internal Audit Department (GIA), whose VP reports to the World Bank's President and to the Audit Committee of the Board of Executive Directors.
- The Compliance Advisor Ombudsman, the independent accountability mechanism of the International Finance Corporation and Multilateral Investment Guarantee Agency

== See also ==
- Global administrative law
