= Principles for Digital Development =

The Principles for Digital Development (the Principles, or the Digital Principles) are a set of nine guidelines that aim to guide institutions working on digital initiatives in the area of sustainable development.

== History ==
Originally developed in 2014, the Principles are endorsed by more than 300 organizations, including donors, international organizations, and civil society organizations.

Discussions about the need for a set of "Digital Principles" began in 2009 when UNICEF launched itsPrinciples for Innovation and Technology Development. A year later, meetings of 40 mhealth donors resulted in the Greentree Principles. In 2014, a "Principles for Digital Development Working Group" was established. The group met nine times over the course of the year, with the participation of over 500 individuals representing more than 100 organizations. Following the working group meetings, an endorsement campaign led by USAID was launched in 2016. 54 organizations endorsed the new Principles for Digital Development. Also in 2016, the United Nations Foundation's Digital Impact Alliance became the steward of the Principles for Digital Development to help facilitate their adoption. According to the group, the principles have influenced funders' procurement policies and the design and implementation of development programmes. In 2024, the Principles were updated in consultation with individuals and organizations. The original principle three "Design for Scale", principle six "Use open standards, open data, open source, and open innovation" and principle eight "Address Privacy and Security" and are no longer part of the updated Principles.

== Principles ==
1. Understand the existing ecosystem
2. Share, reuse, and improve
3. Design with people
4. Design for inclusion
5. Build for sustainability
6. Establish people-first data practices
7. Create open and transparent practices
8. Anticipate and mitigate harms
9. Use evidence to improve outcomes

== Endorsers ==
The Principles for Digital Development are endorsed by over 300 organizations,
