= Independent Evaluation Group =

- Abbreviation: IEG
- Formation: 1970; 56 years ago
- Founder: President of the world bank, Robert McNamara
- Type: Independent Unit
- Purpose: Objectively evaluating the activities of global development agencies
- Location: Washington DC, United States
- Region served: Worldwide
- Director-General: Sabine Bernabè
- Parent organization: World Bank
- Website: ieg.worldbankgroup.org

The Independent Evaluation Group (IEG) is an independent unit within the World Bank Group (WBG) charged with objectively evaluating the activities of the International Bank for Reconstruction and Development (IBRD) and International Development Association (IDA; collectively, the World Bank), the work of International Finance Corporation (IFC) in private sector development, and the Multilateral Investment Guarantee Agency's (MIGA) guarantee projects and services to provide accountability, help the WGB avoid unnecessary mistakes and successfully reach their goals.

The head of IEG, the Director-General, Evaluation, reports directly to the Bank Group's Board of Executive Directors and not to Bank Group management.

== History ==
Evaluation of World Bank projects began in 1970, when President Robert McNamara created an Operations Evaluation Unit in the bank's Programming and Budgeting Department. In 1973, the unit was renamed the Operations Evaluation Department, and thereafter gained increasing independence from bank management. The International Finance Corporation (IFC) established an evaluation unit in 1984, and in 1995, the unit increased its independence under a new name, the Operations Evaluation Group. The Multilateral Investment Guarantee Agency (MIGA) created an evaluation office in 2002. In July 2006 the Board of the Bank Group integrated the independent evaluation functions of the World Bank, IFC, and MIGA into a single unit, the Independent Evaluation Group.

In 2019, Alison Evans, a United Kingdom national, assumed the position of Director-General, Evaluation at the World Bank Group. Before this role, Dr. Evans was the Chief Commissioner of the UK’s Independent Commission for Aid Impact (ICAI) based in London, England.

== Goals ==
The World Bank Group has twin goals: to end extreme poverty and boost shared prosperity. To achieve these goals, the World Bank Group needs to better understand what works and why, to draw lessons and good practices from experience, deepening the evidence base to inform decision making and future action. IEG evaluations seek to provide objective assessments to ensure that the Bank Group is accountable for achieving its development objectives. IEG is one of the 4 units (the four I's) that ensure oversight and accountability at the World Bank Group: the Inspection Panel (IPN) and the Independent Evaluation Group (IEG) reporting to the Board of Executive Directors; the Internal Audit (IAD) reporting to the President and to the Audit Committee; the Integrity Vice Presidency (INT) reporting to the President.

== Expanding evaluation capacity ==
IEG also provides training and advisory monitoring and evaluation (M&E) services to Bank Group client countries. Through this evaluation capacity development, IEG is readying a network of capable evaluators to perform M&E services in their own countries and regions. IEG is a partner in the International Program for Development Evaluation Training (IPDET), the Regional Centers for Learning on Evaluation and Results (CLEAR), and the Evaluation Cooperation Group (ECG).

== See also ==
- World Bank Group
