= List of World Bank members =

The following is a list of the 189 members of the World Bank:

== Member states ==
- Afghanistan
- Albania
- Algeria
- Angola
- Antigua and Barbuda
- Argentina
- Armenia
- Australia
- Austria
- Azerbaijan
- The Bahamas
- Bahrain
- Bangladesh
- Barbados
- Belarus
- Belgium
- Belize
- Benin
- Bhutan
- Bolivia
- Bosnia and Herzegovina
- Botswana
- Brazil
- Brunei
- Bulgaria
- Burkina Faso
- Burundi
- Cambodia
- Cameroon
- Canada
- Cape Verde
- Central African Republic
- Chad
- Chile
- Colombia
- Comoros
- Democratic Republic of the Congo
- Republic of the Congo
- Costa Rica
- Côte d'Ivoire
- Croatia
- Cyprus
- Czech Republic
- Denmark
- Djibouti
- Dominica
- Dominican Republic
- East Timor
- Ecuador
- Egypt
- El Salvador
- Equatorial Guinea
- Eritrea
- Estonia
- Ethiopia
- Fiji
- Finland
- France
- Gabon
- Gambia
- Georgia
- Germany
- Ghana
- Greece
- Grenada
- Guatemala
- Guinea
- Guinea-Bissau
- Guyana
- Haiti
- Honduras
- Hungary
- Iceland
- India
- Indonesia
- Iran
- Iraq
- Ireland
- Israel
- Italy
- Jamaica
- Japan
- Jordan
- Kazakhstan
- Kenya
- Kiribati
- Kosovo
- Kuwait
- Kyrgyzstan
- Laos
- Latvia
- Lebanon
- Lesotho
- Liberia
- Libya
- Lithuania
- Luxembourg
- Madagascar
- Malawi
- Malaysia
- Maldives
- Mali
- Malta
- Marshall Islands
- Mauritania
- Mauritius
- Mexico
- Micronesia
- Moldova
- Mongolia
- Montenegro
- Morocco
- Mozambique
- Myanmar
- Namibia
- Nauru
- Nepal
- Netherlands
- New Zealand
- Nicaragua
- Niger
- Nigeria
- North Macedonia
- Norway
- Oman
- Pakistan
- Palau
- Panama
- Papua New Guinea
- Paraguay
- P.R. China
- Peru
- Philippines
- Poland
- Portugal
- Qatar
- Romania
- Russia
- Rwanda
- Saint Kitts and Nevis
- Saint Lucia
- Saint Vincent
- Samoa
- San Marino
- São Tomé and Príncipe
- Saudi Arabia
- Senegal
- Serbia
- Seychelles
- Sierra Leone
- Singapore
- Slovakia
- Slovenia
- Solomon Islands
- Somalia
- South Africa
- South Korea
- South Sudan
- Spain
- Sri Lanka
- Sudan
- Suriname
- Swaziland
- Sweden
- Switzerland
- Syria
- Tajikistan
- Tanzania
- Thailand
- Togo
- Tonga
- Trinidad and Tobago
- Tunisia
- Turkey
- Turkmenistan
- Tuvalu
- Uganda
- Ukraine
- United Arab Emirates
- United Kingdom
- United States
- Uruguay
- Uzbekistan
- Vanuatu
- Venezuela
- Vietnam
- Yemen
- Zambia
- Zimbabwe

== Non-member states ==
The five United Nations member states that are not members of the World Bank are

- Andorra
- Cuba
- Liechtenstein
- Monaco
- North Korea

Taiwan is the largest economy outside the World Bank, followed by Hong Kong and Macau. The two observer states at the UN, the Vatican City and State of Palestine, are also not members of the World Bank.

Kosovo is not a member of the UN, but is a member of the International Monetary Fund and the World Bank Group, both specialized agencies in the United Nations System.

Liechtenstein, Monaco and Andorra have joined International Monetary Fund, but not yet World Bank Group.

== See also ==
- World Bank
- World Bank Group
- United Nations Development Group
- United Nations Economic and Social Council
