= World Bank Group =

Group making loans to developing countries

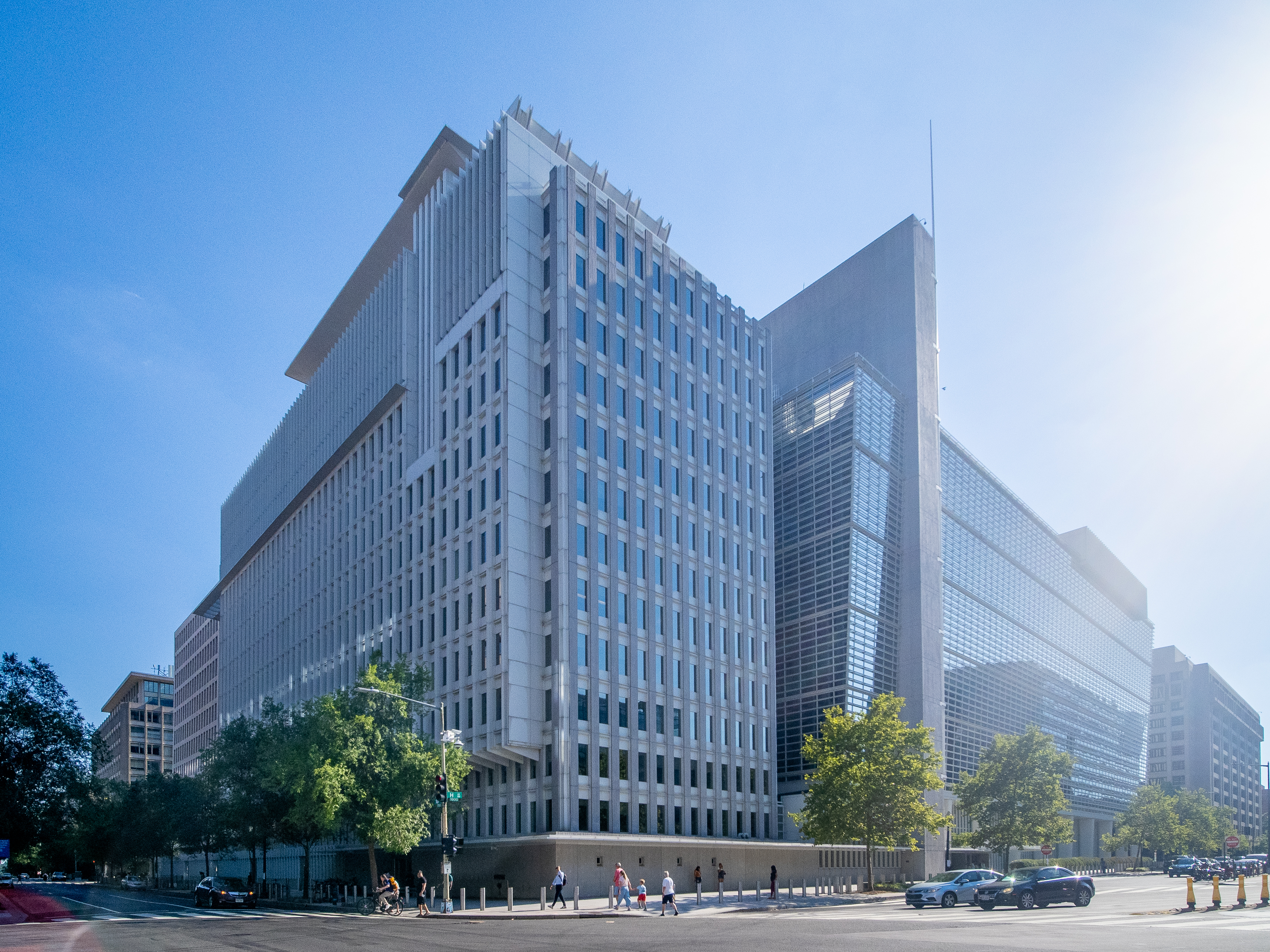
- The World Bank Group building (Washington, D.C.)
- Established: 4 July 1944; 82 years ago
- Type: Intergovernmental organization
- Legal status: Treaty
- Purpose: Economic development, poverty elimination
- Headquarters: 1818 H Street Northwest, Washington D.C., U.S.
- Members: 189 states (188 UN countries and Kosovo) - see List of World Bank members
- President: Ajay Banga
- MD & CFO: Anshula Kant
- Main organ: Board of Directors
- Parent organization: United Nations
- Website: worldbank.org

The World Bank Group (WBG) is a family of five international organizations that make leveraged loans to developing countries. The group is the largest development bank in the world. It is headquartered in Washington, D.C., United States. The bank's stated mission is to achieve the twin goals of ending extreme poverty and building shared prosperity. Historically, within the group, the IBRD and IDA were collectively known as the World Bank due to their emphasis on global lending.

The World Bank was established along with the International Monetary Fund at the 1944 Bretton Woods Conference. Initially, its loans helped rebuild countries devastated by World War II. Over time, it has shifted its focus to development, with a stated mission of eradicating extreme poverty and boosting shared prosperity. It has been criticized for its structural adjustment programs, governance, environmental record, and policies detrimental to social welfare.

The group comprises five organizations, as established over time:

- International Bank for Reconstruction and Development (IBRD), 1944
- International Development Association (IDA), 1960
- International Finance Corporation (IFC), 1956
- International Centre for Settlement of Investment Disputes (ICSID), 1965
- Multilateral Investment Guarantee Agency (MIGA), 1988

== History ==
=== Founding ===
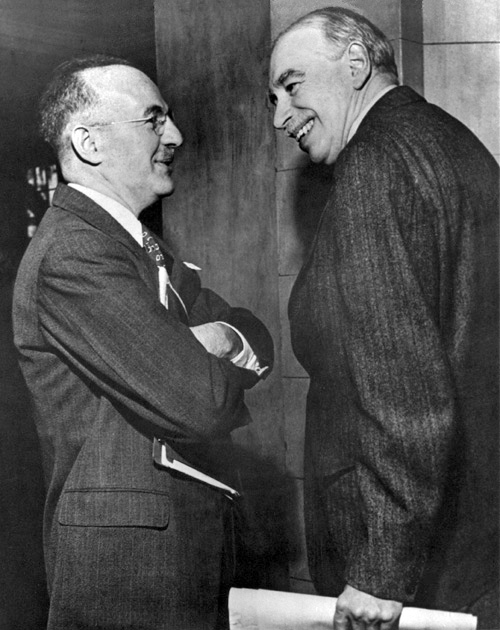
Harry Dexter White (left) and John Maynard Keynes, the "founding fathers" of both the World Bank and the International Monetary Fund (IMF)

The World Bank was created at the 1944 Bretton Woods Conference (1–22 July 1944), along with the International Monetary Fund (IMF). The president of the World Bank is traditionally an American. The World Bank and the IMF are both based in Washington, D.C., and work closely with each other.

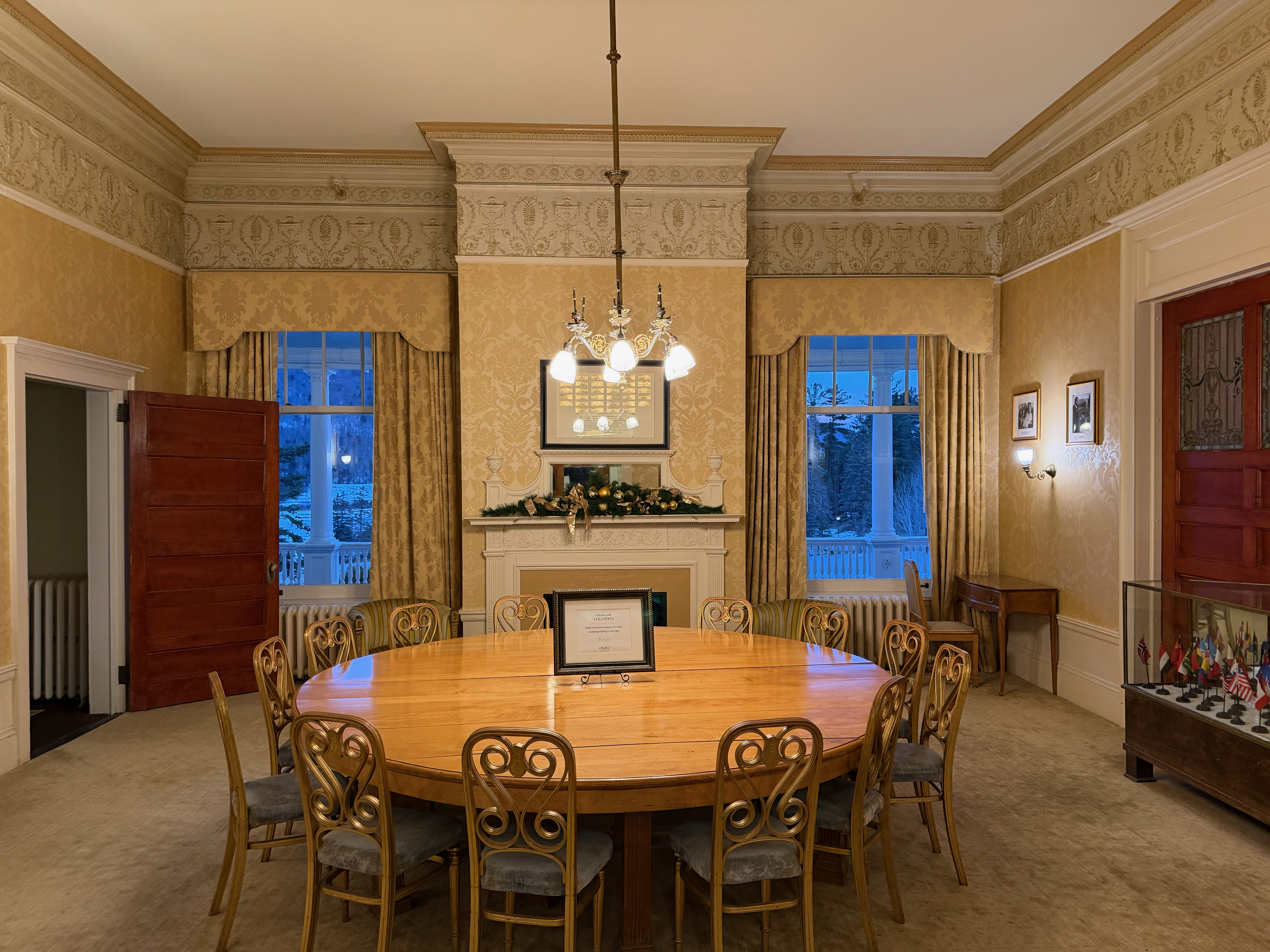
The Gold Room at the Mount Washington Hotel where the International Monetary Fund and World Bank were established

Although many countries were represented at the Bretton Woods Conference, the United States and United Kingdom were the most powerful in attendance and dominated the negotiations. The intention behind the founding of the World Bank was to provide temporary loans to low-income countries that could not obtain loans commercially. The bank may also make loans and demand policy reforms from recipients.

The agreement at Bretton Woods implied that both the World Bank and IMF would be headquartered in the United States. US treasury secretary Henry Morgenthau Jr. intended them to be located in New York, but his successor Fred M. Vinson unilaterally decided that they would be in Washington, D.C. instead, noting that "the institutions would be fatally prejudiced in American opinion if they were placed in New York, since they would then come under the taint of 'international finance'". The World Bank Group came into formal existence on 27 December 1946, following international ratification of the Bretton Woods agreements. The Conference also provided the foundation of the Osiander Committee in 1951, responsible for the preparation and evaluation of the World Development Report. Commencing operations on 25 June 1946, the bank approved its first loan on 9 May 1947 (US$250 million to France for postwar reconstruction - in real terms, the largest loan the bank has issued to date).

=== Cold War era ===
In its early years, the bank made a slow start for two reasons: it was underfunded, and there were leadership struggles between the US executive director and the president of the organization. When the Marshall Plan went into effect in 1947, many European countries began receiving aid from other sources. Faced with this competition, the World Bank shifted its focus to non-European allies. Until 1968, its loans were earmarked for the construction of infrastructure works, such as seaports, highway systems, and power plants, that would generate enough income to enable a borrower country to repay the loan. In 1960, the International Development Association was formed (as opposed to a UN fund named SUNFED), providing soft loans to developing countries.

Before 1974, the reconstruction and development loans the World Bank made were relatively small. Its staff was aware of the need to instill confidence in the bank. Fiscal conservatism ruled, and loan applications had to meet strict criteria.

The first country to receive a World Bank loan was France in 1947. The bank's president at the time, John McCloy, chose France over two other applicants, Poland and Chile. The loan was for US$250 million, half the amount requested, and came with strict conditions. France had to agree to produce a balanced budget and give priority of debt repayment to the World Bank over other governments. World Bank staff closely monitored the use of the funds to ensure that the French government met the conditions. In addition, before the loan was approved, the United States Department of State told the French government that its members associated with the Communist Party would first have to be removed. The French government complied and removed the Communist coalition government—the so-called tripartite. Within hours, the loan to France was approved.

From 1974 to 1980, the bank concentrated on meeting the basic needs of people in the developing world. The size and number of loans to borrowers greatly increased, as loan targets expanded from infrastructure into social services and other sectors.

These changes can be attributed to Robert McNamara, who was appointed to the presidency in 1968 by Lyndon B. Johnson. McNamara implored bank treasurer Eugene Rotberg to seek out new sources of capital outside of the northern banks that had been the primary sources of funding. Rotberg used the global bond market to increase the capital available to the bank. One consequence of the period of poverty alleviation lending was the rapid rise of debt of developing countries. From 1976 to 1980, developing world debt rose at an average annual rate of 20%.

The World Bank Administrative Tribunal was established in 1980, to decide on disputes between the World Bank Group and its staff where allegation of non-observance of contracts of employment or terms of appointment had not been honored.

McNamara was succeeded by U.S. President Jimmy Carter's nominee, Alden W. Clausen, in 1980. Clausen replaced many members of McNamara's staff and crafted a different mission emphasis. His 1982 decision to replace the bank's Chief Economist, Hollis B. Chenery, with Anne Krueger was an example of this new focus. Krueger was known for her criticism of development funding and for describing developing countries' governments as "rent-seeking states".

During the 1980s, the bank emphasized lending to service debt of developing countries, and structural adjustment policies designed to streamline the economies of developing nations. UNICEF reported in the late 1980s that the structural adjustment programs of the World Bank had been responsible for "reduced health, nutritional and educational levels for tens of millions of children in Asia, Latin America, and Africa".

== Membership ==
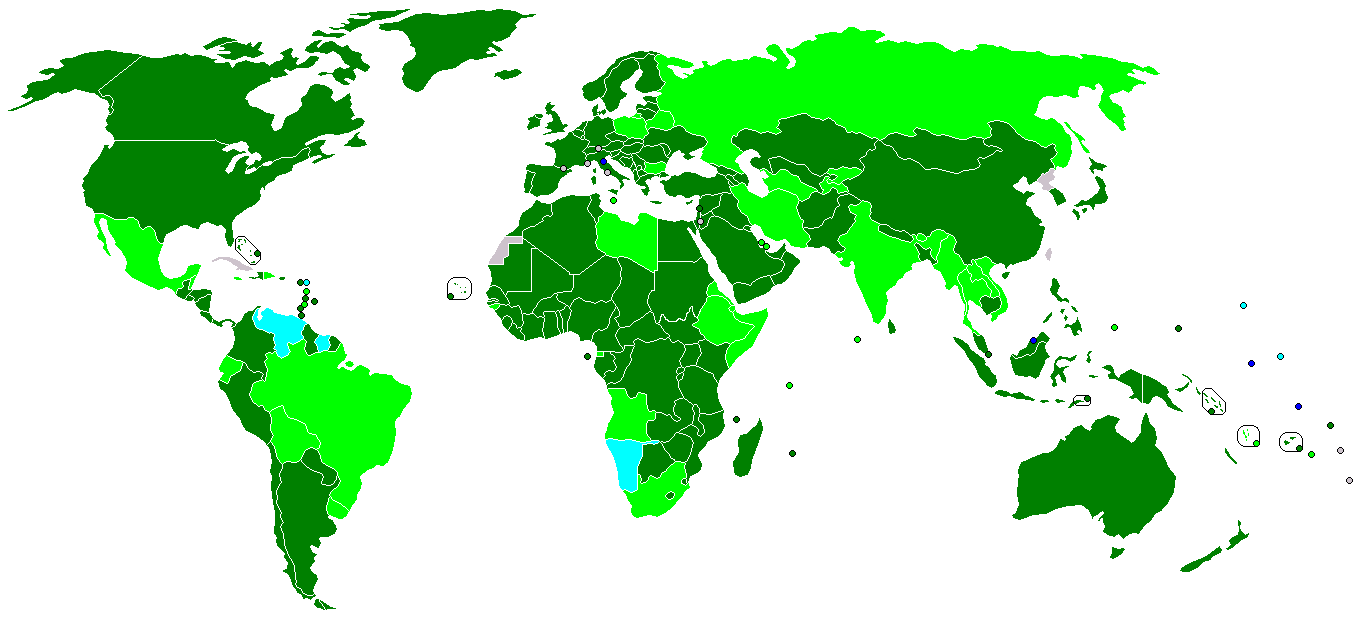
World Bank Group: Member states of all five WBG organizations Member states of four WBG organizations Member states of three WBG organizations Member states of two WBG organizations Member states only of the IBRD

The International Bank for Reconstruction and Development (IBRD) has 189 member countries, while the International Development Association (IDA) has 175. Each member state of IBRD should also be a member of the International Monetary Fund (IMF) and only members of IBRD are allowed to join other institutions within the bank (such as IDA). The five United Nations member states that are not members of the World Bank are Andorra, Cuba, Liechtenstein, Monaco, and North Korea. Kosovo is not a member of the UN, but is a member of the IMF and the World Bank Group, including the IBRD and IDA. Other non-members are Palestine, the Holy See (Vatican City), Taiwan, and the following de facto states: Abkhazia, Northern Cyprus, the Sahrawi Arab Democratic Republic, Somaliland, South Ossetia, and Transnistria.

The Republic of China joined the World Bank on 27 December 1945. After the Chinese Civil War, the government fled to Taiwan and continued its membership in the WBG until 16 April 1980, when the People's Republic of China replaced the ROC. Since then, it uses the name "Taiwan, China".

All of the 188 UN members and Kosovo that are WBG members participate at a minimum in the IBRD. As of May 2016, all of them also participate in some of the other four organizations (IDA, IFC, MIGA, and ICSID).

WBG members by the number of organizations in which they participate:

1. Only in the IBRD:
2. The IBRD and one other organization: Nauru, San Marino
3. The IBRD and two other organizations: Antigua and Barbuda, Brunei, Kiribati, Marshall Islands, Namibia, Tuvalu, Venezuela
4. The IBRD and three other organizations: India, Mexico, Belize, Jamaica, Dominican Republic, Brazil, Bolivia, Uruguay, Ecuador, Dominica, Saint Vincent and the Grenadines, Guinea-Bissau, Equatorial Guinea, Angola, South Africa, Seychelles, Libya, Somalia, Ethiopia, Eritrea, Djibouti, Bahrain, Qatar, Iran, Malta, Poland, Russia, Belarus, Kyrgyzstan, Tajikistan, Turkmenistan, Thailand, Laos, Vietnam, Palau, Tonga, Vanuatu, Maldives, Bhutan, Myanmar, Suriname
5. All five WBG organizations: the rest of the 139 WBG members

=== Voting power ===
In 2010, voting powers at the World Bank were revised to increase the voice of developing countries, notably China. The countries with most voting power are now the United States (15.85%), Japan (6.84%), China (4.42%), Germany (4.00%), the United Kingdom (3.75%), France (3.75%), India (2.91%), Russia (2.77%), Saudi Arabia (2.77%) and Italy (2.64%). Under the changes, known as 'Voice Reform – Phase 2', countries other than China that saw significant gains included South Korea, Turkey, Mexico, Singapore, Greece, Czech Republic, Hungary, Brazil, India, and Spain. Most developed countries' voting power was reduced, along with a few developing countries such as Nigeria. The voting powers of the United States, Russia and Saudi Arabia remained unchanged.

The changes were brought about to make voting more universal in regards to standards, rule-based objective indicators, and transparency among other things. Now, developing countries have an increased voice in the "Pool Model", backed especially by Europe. Additionally, voting power is based on economic size in addition to the International Development Association contributions.

=== List of 20 largest countries by voting power in each World Bank institution ===
The following table shows the subscriptions of the top 20 member countries of the World Bank by voting power in the following World Bank institutions as of December 2014 or March 2015: the International Bank for Reconstruction and Development (IBRD), the International Finance Corporation (IFC), the International Development Association (IDA), and the Multilateral Investment Guarantee Agency (MIGA). Member countries are allocated votes at the time of membership and subsequently for additional subscriptions to capital (one vote for each share of capital stock held by the member).

The 20 largest countries by voting power (number of votes)
Rank	Country	IBRD	Country	IFC	Country	IDA	Country	MIGA
	World	2,201,754	World	2,653,476	World	24,682,951	World	218,237
1	United States	358,498	United States	570,179	United States	2,546,503	United States	32,790
2	Japan	166,094	Japan	163,334	Japan	2,112,243	Japan	9,205
3	China	107,244	Germany	129,708	United Kingdom	1,510,934	Germany	9,162
4	Germany	97,224	France	121,815	Germany	1,368,001	France	8,791
5	France	87,241	United Kingdom	121,815	France	908,843	United Kingdom	8,791
6	United Kingdom	87,241	India	103,747	Saudi Arabia	810,293	China	5,756
7	India	67,690	Russia	103,653	India	661,909	Russia	5,754
8	Saudi Arabia	67,155	Canada	82,142	Canada	629,658	Saudi Arabia	5,754
9	Canada	59,004	Italy	82,142	Italy	573,858	India	5,597
10	Italy	54,877	China	62,392	China	521,830	Canada	5,451
11	Russia	54,651	Netherlands	56,931	Poland	498,102	Italy	5,196
12	Spain	42,948	Belgium	51,410	Sweden	494,360	Netherlands	4,048
13	Brazil	42,613	Australia	48,129	Netherlands	488,209	Belgium	3,803
14	Netherlands	42,348	Switzerland	44,863	Brazil	412,322	Australia	3,245
15	South Korea	36,591	Brazil	40,279	Australia	312,566	Switzerland	2,869
16	Belgium	36,463	Mexico	38,929	Switzerland	275,755	Brazil	2,832
17	Iran	34,718	Spain	37,826	Belgium	275,474	Spain	2,491
18	Switzerland	33,296	Indonesia	32,402	Norway	258,209	Argentina	2,436
19	Australia	30,910	Saudi Arabia	30,862	Denmark	231,685	Indonesia	2,075
20	Turkey	26,293	South Korea	28,895	Pakistan	218,506	Sweden	2,075

== Organizational structure ==
The World Bank Group Building in Washington, D.C.

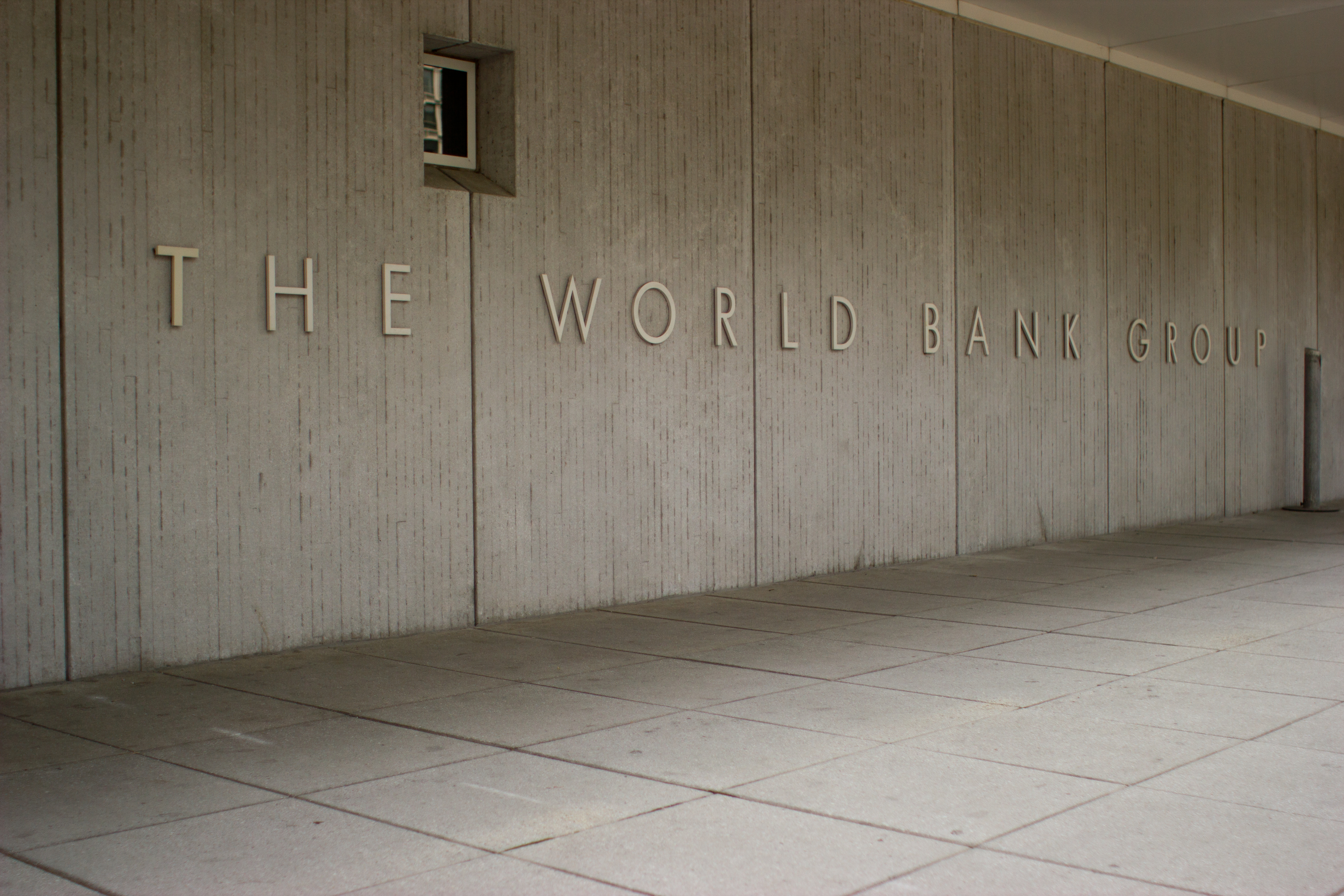
The World Bank Sign on the building

Together with four affiliated agencies created between 1957 and 1988, the IBRD is part of the World Bank Group. The group's headquarters are in Washington, D.C. It is an international organization owned by member governments; although it makes profits, they are used to support continued efforts in poverty reduction.

Technically the World Bank is part of the United Nations system, but its governance structure is different: each institution in the World Bank Group is owned by its member governments, which subscribe to its basic share capital, with votes proportional to shareholding. Membership gives certain voting rights that are the same for all countries but there are also additional votes that depend on financial contributions to the organization. The president of the World Bank is nominated by the president of the United States and elected by the bank's Board of Governors. As of 15 November 2009, the United States held 16.4% of total votes, Japan 7.9%, Germany 4.5%, the United Kingdom 4.3%, and France 4.3%. As changes to the bank's Charter require an 85% supermajority, the U.S. can block any major change in the bank's governing structure. Because the U.S. exerts formal and informal influence over the bank as a result of its vote share, control over the presidency, and the bank's headquarters location in Washington, D.C., friends and allies of the U.S. receive more projects with more lenient terms.

=== World Bank Group agencies ===
The World Bank Group consists of

- the International Bank for Reconstruction and Development (IBRD), established in 1944, which provides debt financing based on sovereign guarantees;
- the International Finance Corporation (IFC), established in 1956, which provides various forms of financing without sovereign guarantees, primarily to the private sector;
- the International Development Association (IDA), established in 1960, which provides concessional financing (interest-free loans or grants), usually with sovereign guarantees;
- the International Centre for Settlement of Investment Disputes (ICSID), established in 1965, which works with governments to reduce investment risk;
- the Multilateral Investment Guarantee Agency (MIGA), established in 1988, which provides insurance against certain types of risk, including political risk, primarily to the private sector.

The term "World Bank" generally refers to just the IBRD and IDA, whereas the term "World Bank Group" or "WBG" is used to refer to all five institutions collectively.

The World Bank Institute is the capacity development branch of the World Bank, providing learning and other capacity-building programs to member countries.

The IBRD has 189 member governments, and the other institutions have between 153 and 184. The institutions of the World Bank Group are all run by a board of governors meeting once a year. Each member country appoints a governor, generally its minister of finance. Daily, the World Bank Group is run by a board of 25 executive directors to whom the governors have delegated certain powers. Each director represents either one country (for the largest countries), or a group of countries. Executive directors are appointed by their respective governments or the constituencies.

The agencies of the World Bank are each governed by their Articles of Agreement that serves as the legal and institutional foundation for all their work.

The activities of the IFC and MIGA include investment in the private sector and providing insurance, respectively.

=== Presidency ===
Traditionally, the bank president has been a U.S. citizen nominated by the president of the United States, the bank's largest shareholder. The nominee is subject to confirmation by the executive directors, to serve a five-year, renewable term.

==== Current president ====
Ajay Banga is the current and 14th president of the World Bank Group.

=== Managing director ===
The World Bank Group has several Managing Directors, each with different areas of responsibility. These responsibilities include organizational strategy; budget and strategic planning; information technology; shared services; Corporate Procurement; General Services and Corporate Security; the Sanctions System; and the Conflict Resolution and Internal Justice System.

=== Extractive Industries Review ===
After longstanding criticisms from civil society of the bank's involvement in the oil, gas, and mining sectors, the World Bank in July 2001 launched an independent review called the Extractive Industries Review (EIR—not to be confused with Environmental Impact Report). The review was headed by an "Eminent Person", Emil Salim (former Environment Minister of Indonesia). Salim held consultations with a wide range of stakeholders in 2002 and 2003. The EIR recommendations were published in January 2004 in a final report, "Striking a Better Balance". The report concluded that fossil fuel and mining projects do not alleviate poverty, and recommended that World Bank involvement with these sectors be phased out by 2008 to be replaced by investment in renewable energy and clean energy. The World Bank published its Management Response to the EIR in September 2004 after extensive discussions with the board of directors. The Management Response did not accept many of the EIR report's conclusions, but the EIR served to alter the World Bank's policies on oil, gas, and mining in important ways, as the World Bank documented in a recent follow-up report. One area of particular controversy concerned the rights of indigenous peoples. Critics point out that the Management Response weakened a key recommendation that indigenous peoples and affected communities should have to provide 'consent for projects to proceed; instead, there would be 'consultation'. Following the EIR process, the World Bank issued a revised Policy on Indigenous Peoples.

== Accountability ==
=== Inspection Panel ===
The World Bank's Inspection Panel was established in 1993 by its Board of Directors. Its purpose is to allow citizens in developing countries to file complaints if the projects that the World Bank finances violated its own social and environmental sustainability policies. It was created after requests from transnational NGO advocacy groups and U.S Congressional reformers, some of whom had considered cutting off foreign aid.

In its first six years since it was created, the Inspection Panel evaluated 15 civil society campaigns, most of which targeted large infrastructure projects (hydroelectric dams, bridges, and power plants) that caused environmental damage and faced opposition from local communities. Some of which also drew international attention.

Several high-profile complaints led to projects being cancelled. However, the Board rejected full investigations in most cases, or accepted weak governmental promises of compliance from borrowing governments. Moreover, many governments that borrowed from the World Bank, like Brazil and India, argued that the panel's inspections interfered with their national sovereignty. Supporters also argued that the panel have affected communities a way to be heard. The World Bank responded internally by "panel-proofing" future projects with administrative checklists, and shifting mandatory policies into non-binding suggestive guidelines.

=== Independent Evaluation Group (IEG) ===
The Independent Evaluation Group is the World Bank's oldest evaluation group. It was created in 1970 and was originally called the Operations Evaluation Unit. Its purpose is to inspect completed World Bank projects in order to grade the performance of the loans and check the self-evaluation reports that the Bank's staff complete for every project.

The IEG is completely independent of the Bank's management and only reports to the Bank's Board of Executive Directors, which represents the Bank's member countries. This means that the IEG sends its evaluation reports directly to the Board. This has caused some disagreement. Some of the Bank's managers argue that independence leads the evaluators to be isolated from the operational staff, which can create tension and prevent project teams from gaining experience that would serve in future projects. Critics also say that IEG reviews are often delayed and focus on grading past work rather than giving advice, which may limit what staff learn from past mistakes.

=== Integrity Vice Presidency (INT) ===
The Integrity Vice Presidency (INT) is an independent unit that investigates fraud and corruption in projects that are being financed by the World Bank Group. These cases also involve contractors and Bank staff and reports directly to the World Bank President. It was created in 2001 as the Department of Institutional Integrity.

When the INT finds sufficient evidence of misconduct, it starts a sanction process. These decisions are made through a two-step process that involves other groups like the Suspension and Debarment Officers, who are independent from the INT, and the Bank's Sanctions Board. If the firm or individual that is being evaluated are sanctioned, they are restricted from receiving financed contracts for a period of time.

=== Compliance Advisor Ombudsman (CAO) ===
The Compliance Advisor Ombudsman was created in 1999, and it is the independent accountability mechanism for projects supported by other World bank private-sector branches. People that are directly affected by the environmental and social impacts of the projects that are being financed by the Bank can bring their concerns to the CAO. In the fiscal year of 2025, it handled 63 cases in 26 countries.

The CAO has three primary roles. It gives communities and companies a neutral space to work disputes out. Additionally, it investigates cases in which communities or individuals have raised concerns about a project's environmental and social implications. Finally, it takes an advisory role and uses lessons from past cases to help other World Bank branches improve. The CAO's findings from its investigations are not binding, which has led to criticism. It has previously happened that the International Finance Corporation (IFC), which is a member of the World Bank Group, rejected most of the CAO'S findings and did not comply with their own social and environmental standards.

== Methods ==
The World Bank plays a significant role in global economic governance due to its broad mandate, its vast resource base, its frequent and regular interactions with governments as clients, and its many publications and databases. In 2020, the World Bank's total commitments amounted to USD 77.1 billion and it operated in 145 countries. World Bank projects cover a range of areas from building schools to fighting disease, providing water and electricity, and environmental protection.

As a guideline to the World Bank's operations in any particular country, a Country Assistance Strategy is produced in cooperation with the local government and any interested stakeholders and may rely on analytical work performed by the bank or other parties.

The World Bank's negative pledge clause prohibits its debtor countries from using public assets to repay other creditors before they repay the World Bank.

=== Environmental and social safeguards ===
To ensure that World Bank-financed operations do not compromise these goals but instead add to their realisation, the following environmental, social, and legal safeguards were defined: Environmental Assessment, Indigenous Peoples, Involuntary Resettlement, Physical Cultural Resources, Forests, Natural Habitats, Pest Management, Safety of Dams, Projects in Disputed Areas, Projects on International Waterways, and Performance Standards for Private Sector Activities.

At the World Bank's 2012 annual meeting in Tokyo, a review of these safeguards was initiated, which was welcomed by several civil society organisations. As a result, the World Bank developed a new Environmental and Social Framework, which has been in implementation since 1 October 2018.

The World Bank or the World Bank Group is also a sitting observer in the United Nations Sustainable Development Group.

=== Loans for environmental protection ===
Beginning in 1989, in response to harsh criticism from many groups, the bank began including environmental groups and NGOs in its loans to mitigate the past effects of its development policies that had prompted the criticism. It also formed an implementing agency, in accordance with the Montreal Protocols, to stop ozone-depletion damage to the Earth's atmosphere by phasing out the use of 95% of ozone-depleting chemicals, with a target date of 2015. Since then, in accordance with its so-called "Six Strategic Themes", the bank has put various additional policies into effect to preserve the environment while promoting development. For example, in 1991, the bank announced that to protect against deforestation, especially in the Amazon, it would not finance any commercial logging or infrastructure projects that harm the environment.

=== Poverty reduction strategies ===
For the poorest developing countries in the world, the bank's assistance plans are based on poverty reduction strategies; by combining an analysis of local groups with an analysis of the country's financial and economic situation the World Bank develops a plan pertaining to the country in question. The government then identifies the country's priorities and targets for the reduction of poverty, and the World Bank instigates its aid efforts correspondingly.

Forty-five countries pledged US$25.1 billion in "aid for the world's poorest countries", aid that goes to the World Bank International Development Association (IDA), which distributes the loans to eighty poorer countries. Wealthier nations sometimes fund their own aid projects, including those for diseases. Robert B. Zoellick, the former president of the World Bank, said when the loans were announced on 15 December 2007, that IDA money "is the core funding that the poorest developing countries rely on".

World Bank organizes the Development Marketplace Awards, a grant program that surfaces and funds development projects with potential for development impact that are scalable or replicable. The grant beneficiaries are social enterprises with projects that aim to deliver social and public services to groups with the lowest incomes.

=== Efforts to reduce economic inequality ===
In 2013 the bank adopted the concept of shared prosperity as one of the World Bank's "Twin Goals" for that year, with the other one focusing on poverty reduction, aiming to reduce the share of people in extreme poverty to 3 percent of the global population by 2030. The bank defined shared prosperity as increasing the income of the bottom 40 percent of the population in each country. As a result, reducing economic inequality, in this definition, had become an integral part of the World Bank's objectives.

The World Bank has been criticized for not embracing the reduction of economic inequality (be it economic inequality within a country, or international inequality between countries) as a goal. Instead, the bank has taken an instrumental approach to the issue, in which economic inequality policies were seen as useful as long as they contributed to reducing (extreme) poverty or promoting average economic growth.

As part of the 2030 Agenda, Sustainable Development Goal 10 (SDG 10) aim to reduce inequalities within countries and among countries. World Bank officials participated in the negotiations for SDG 10 in the years prior to 2015. They advocated for the adoption of the bank's own preferred benchmarks. The World Bank is also one of nine custodian agencies for SDG 10.

The bank has stated its ambition to help catalyze the SDGs through "thought leadership, global convening, and country-level uptake". However, scholars have stated that the World Bank strategically uses the power of the Sustainable Development Goals (SDGs) in its favor to reinforce its own policies or interests while minimizing the chance of being itself reshaped or transformed by these goals.

=== United Nations Department of Global Communications ===
Based on an agreement between the United Nations and the World Bank in 1981, Development Business became the official source for World Bank Procurement Notices, Contract Awards, and Project Approvals.

In 1998, the agreement was renegotiated, and included in this agreement was a joint venture to create an online version of the publication. Today, Development Business is the primary publication for all major multilateral development banks, U.N. agencies, and several national governments, many of which have made the publication of their tenders and contracts in Development Business a mandatory requirement.

=== Open data and open knowledge repository ===
The World Bank collects and processes large amounts of data and generates them on the basis of economic models. These data and models have gradually been made available to the public in a way that encourages reuse, whereas the recent publications describing them are available as open access under a Creative Commons Attribution License, for which the bank received the SPARC Innovator 2012 award.

The World Bank hosts the Open Knowledge Repository as an official open access repository for its research outputs and knowledge products. The World Bank's repository is listed in the Registry of Research Data Repositories re3data.org.

The World Bank also endorses the Principles for Digital Development.

=== International Health Partnership ===
Together with the World Health Organization, the World Bank administers the International Health Partnership (IHP+). IHP+ is a group of partners committed to improving the health of citizens in developing countries. Partners work together to put international principles for aid effectiveness and development cooperation into practice in the health sector. IHP+ mobilizes national governments, development agencies, civil society, and others to support a single, country-led national health strategy in a well-coordinated way.

=== COVID-19 pandemic ===
In September 2020, during the COVID-19 pandemic, the World Bank announced a $12 billion plan to supply "low and middle income countries" with a vaccine once it was approved. In June 2022, the bank reported that $10.1 billion had been allocated to supply 78 countries with the vaccine

The US Treasury has committed $667 million for the World Bank's global Pandemic Fund, a third of the $2 billion the fund hopes to raise. The Pandemic Fund, established in September 2022, is a collaborative initiative among countries, implementing partners, philanthropies, and civil society organizations. It aims to fund investments that address critical gaps in pandemic prevention, preparedness, and response capacities at national, regional, and global levels, with a particular focus on low- and middle-income countries.

The World Bank has been criticized for the slow response of its Pandemic Emergency Financing Facility (PEF), a fund that was created to provide money to help manage pandemic outbreaks. The terms of the PEF, which is financed by bonds sold to private investors, prevent any money from being released from the fund until 12 weeks after the outbreak was initially detected (23 March). The COVID-19 pandemic met all other requirements for the funding to be released in January 2020.

In October 2026, World Bank President Ajay Banga said the bank could provide up to $100 billion in funding if the economic impact of the war in the Middle East worsened. The money could come from emergency aid as well as funds redirected from projects the bank had already approved.

== Response to climate change ==
World Bank President Jim Yong Kim said in 2012:

A 4-degree warmer world can, and must be, avoided—we need to hold warming below 2 degrees ... Lack of action on climate change threatens to make the world our children inherit a completely different world than we are living in today. Climate change is one of the single biggest challenges facing development, and we need to assume the moral responsibility to take action on behalf of future generations, especially the poorest.

In December 2017, Kim announced the World Bank would no longer finance fossil fuel development. In 2019, the International Consortium of Investigative Journalists reported that the bank continues to finance fossil fuel infrastructure and that the bank "has yet to meaningfully shift away from fossil fuels." Civil society groups, including Extinction Rebellion, joined with EU finance ministers in November 2019 to call for an end to World Bank funding of fossil fuels.

In 2023, U.S. president Joe Biden nominated Ajay Banga for president of the World Bank partly due to Banga's support for climate action. The previous president David Malpass faced criticism for challenging the scientific consensus on climate change. The same year, the UN operationalized the Fund for Responding to Loss and Damage, which the World Bank hosts to provide climate finance directly to vulnerable frontline communities.

In 2025, the bank faced criticism from environmental and animal welfare activists for continuing to finance greenhouse gas intensive industrial animal agriculture operations despite promising to align its investments with the 2015 Paris Agreement. Between 2018 and 2024, activists say the bank invested $650 million in such projects.

== Grants table ==
The following table lists the top 15 DAC 5 Digit Sectors to which the World Bank has committed funding, as recorded in its International Aid Transparency Initiative (IATI) publications. The World Bank states on the IATI Registry website that the amounts "will cover 100% of IBRD and IDA development flows" but will not cover other development flows.

	Committed funding (US$ millions)											
Sector	Before 2007	2007	2008	2009	2010	2011	2012	2013	2014	2015	2016	Sum
Road transport	4,654.2	1,993.5	1,501.8	5,550.3	4,032.3	2,603.7	3,852.5	2,883.6	3,081.7	3,922.6	723.7	34,799.8
Social/ welfare services	613.1	208.1	185.5	2,878.4	1,477.4	1,493.2	1,498.5	2,592.6	2,745.4	1,537.7	73.6	15,303.5
Electrical transmission/ distribution	1,292.5	862.1	1,740.2	2,435.4	1,465.1	907.7	1,614.9	395.7	2,457.1	1,632.2	374.8	15,177.8
Public finance management	334.2	223.1	499.7	129.0	455.3	346.6	3,156.8	2,724.0	3,160.5	2,438.9	690.5	14,158.6
Rail transport	279.3	284.4	1,289.0	912.2	892.5	1,487.4	841.8	740.6	1,964.9	1,172.2	−1.6	9,862.5
Rural development	335.4	237.5	382.8	616.7	2,317.4	972.0	944.0	177.8	380.9	1,090.3	−2.5	7,452.4
Urban development and management	261.2	375.9	733.3	739.6	542.1	1,308.1	914.3	258.9	747.3	1,122.1	212.2	7,214.9
Business support services and institutions	113.3	20.8	721.7	181.4	363.3	514.0	310.0	760.1	1,281.9	1,996.0	491.3	6,753.7
Energy policy and administrative management	102.5	243.0	324.9	234.2	762.0	654.9	902.1	480.5	1,594.2	1,001.8	347.9	6,648.0
Agricultural water resources	733.2	749.5	84.6	251.8	780.6	819.5	618.3	1,040.3	1,214.8	824.0	−105.8	7,011.0
Decentralisation and support to subnational government	904.5	107.9	176.1	206.7	331.2	852.8	880.6	466.8	1,417.0	432.5	821.3	6,597.3
Disaster prevention and preparedness	66.9	2.7	260.0	9.0	417.2	609.5	852.9	373.5	1,267.8	1,759.7	114.2	5,733.5
Sanitation - large systems	441.9	679.7	521.6	422.0	613.1	1,209.4	268.0	55.4	890.6	900.8	93.9	6,096.3
Water supply - large systems	646.5	438.1	298.3	486.5	845.1	640.2	469.0	250.5	1,332.4	609.9	224.7	6,241.3
Health policy and administrative management	661.3	54.8	285.8	673.8	1,581.4	799.3	251.5	426.3	154.8	368.1	496.0	5,753.1
Other	13,162.7	6,588.3	8,707.1	11,425.7	17,099.5	11,096.6	16,873.4	13,967.1	20,057.6	21,096.5	3,070.3	140,074.5
Total	24,602.6	13,069.4	17,712.6	27,152.6	33,975.6	26,314.8	34,248.6	27,593.9	43,748.8	41,905.2	7,624.5	297,948.5

== People ==
=== Presidents ===
The president of the bank is the president of the entire World Bank Group. The president is responsible for chairing meetings of the boards of directors and for overall management of the bank.

Traditionally, based on a tacit understanding between the United States and Europe, the president of the World Bank has been selected from candidates nominated by the United States, the largest shareholder in the bank. The World Bank tends to lend more readily to countries that are friendly with the United States, not because of direct U.S. influence but because of the employees of the World Bank. The nominee is subject to confirmation by the board of executive directors to serve a five-year, renewable term. While most World Bank presidents have had banking experience, some have not.

On 23 March 2012, U.S. president Barack Obama announced that the United States would nominate Jim Yong Kim as the next president of the bank. Jim Yong Kim was elected on 27 April 2012 and reelected to a second five-year term in 2017. He announced his resignation effective 1 February 2019 and was replaced on an interim basis by now-former World Bank CEO Kristalina Georgieva, then by David Malpass on 9 April 2019. Malpass faced criticism in 2023 as he had "sparked outcry by appearing to question the role of humans in climate change".

In 2023, a new president was appointed: Ajay Banga. His term began on 2 June 2023. He was supported by the American president Joe Biden partly because he supports climate action. He is also expected to help low-income countries deal with debts. He is the first Indian American to lead the bank.

Presidents of the World Bank
Name	Dates	Nationality	Previous work
Eugene Meyer	1946–1946	United States	Newspaper publisher and Chairman of the Federal Reserve
John J. McCloy	1947–1949	United States	Lawyer and United States Assistant Secretary of War
Eugene R. Black, Sr.	1949–1963	United States	Bank executive with Chase Bank and executive director with the World Bank
George Woods	1963–1968	United States	Bank executive with First Boston
Robert McNamara	1968–1981	United States	President of the Ford Motor Company, United States Secretary of Defense under presidents John F. Kennedy and Lyndon B. Johnson
Alden W. Clausen	1981–1986	United States	Lawyer, bank executive with Bank of America
Barber Conable	1986–1991	United States	New York State Senator and US Congressman
Lewis T. Preston	1991–1995	United States	Bank executive with J.P. Morgan & Co.
James Wolfensohn	1995–2005	United States and Australia	Wolfensohn was a naturalised American citizen before taking office. Corporate lawyer and banker
Paul Wolfowitz	2005–2007	United States	US Ambassador to Indonesia, US Deputy Secretary of Defense, dean of the School of Advanced International Studies (SAIS) at Johns Hopkins University, a prominent architect of 2003 invasion of Iraq, resigned World Bank post due to ethics scandal
Robert Zoellick	2007–2012	United States	United States Deputy Secretary of State and US Trade Representative
Jim Yong Kim	2012–2019	United States	Former Chair of the Department of Global Health and Social Medicine at Harvard, president of Dartmouth College, naturalized American citizen
Kristalina Georgieva (acting)	2019	Bulgaria	Former European Commissioner for the Budget and Human Resources and 2010's "European of the Year"
David Malpass	2019–2023	United States	Under Secretary of the Treasury for International Affairs
Ajay Banga	2023–present	United States	Former head of Mastercard

=== Vice presidents and boards of directors ===
The vice presidents of the bank are its principal managers, in charge of regions, sectors, networks and functions. There are two executive vice presidents, three senior vice presidents, and 24 vice presidents.

The boards of directors consist of the World Bank Group president and 25 executive directors. The president is the presiding officer, and ordinarily has no vote except to break a tie. The executive directors as individuals cannot exercise any power or commit or represent the bank unless the boards specifically authorized them to do so. With the term beginning 1 November 2010, the number of executive directors increased by one, to 25.

=== Chief economists ===
World Bank chief economists
Name	Dates	Nationality
Hollis B. Chenery	1972–1982	United States
Anne Osborn Krueger	1982–1986	United States
Stanley Fischer	1988–1990	United States and Israel
Lawrence Summers	1991–1993	United States
Michael Bruno	1993–1996	Israel
Joseph E. Stiglitz	1997–2000	United States
Nicholas Stern	2000–2003	United Kingdom
François Bourguignon	2003–2007	France
Justin Yifu Lin	2008–2012	China
Kaushik Basu	2012–2016	India
Paul Romer	2016–2018	United States
Shanta Devarajan (Acting)	2018–2018	United States
Penny Goldberg	2018–2020	United States
Aart Kraay (Acting)	2020–2020	
Carmen Reinhart	2020–2022	United States
Indermit Gill	2022–2026	India
Michael Kremer	2026–present	United States

=== Staff ===
In 2020, the World Bank had 12,300 full-time staff, and it operated in 145 countries.

=== Politicians who were World Bank employees ===
Some notable politicians who worked for the World Bank include:

- Ashraf Ghani, was Lead Anthropologist at the World Bank and President of Afghanistan (2014–2021).
- Fakhruddin Ahmed was the chief adviser of the interim Government of Bangladesh during the political crisis of 2006–2008.
- Ngozi Okonjo-Iweala, former World Bank Managing Director who held several posts in the government of Nigeria, including Minister of Finance.
- Sri Mulyani Indrawati, former World Bank Managing Director and former Minister of Finance of Indonesia (2005–2010 & 2016–2025)
- Ellen Johnson Sirleaf, World Bank Director for West Africa and President of Liberia (2006–2018).

=== List of World Bank Directors-General of Evaluation ===
- Christopher Willoughby, Successively Unit Chief, Division Chief, and Department Director for Operations Evaluation (1970–1976)
- Mervyn L. Weiner, First Director-General, Operations Evaluation (1975–1984)
- Yves Rovani, Director-General, Operations Evaluation (1986–1992)
- Robert Picciotto, Director-General, Operations Evaluation (1992–2002)
- Gregory K. Ingram, Director-General, Operations Evaluation (2002–2005)
- Vinod Thomas, Director-General, Evaluation (2005–2011)
- Caroline Heider, Director-General, Evaluation (2011–present)

== Criticisms and controversy ==
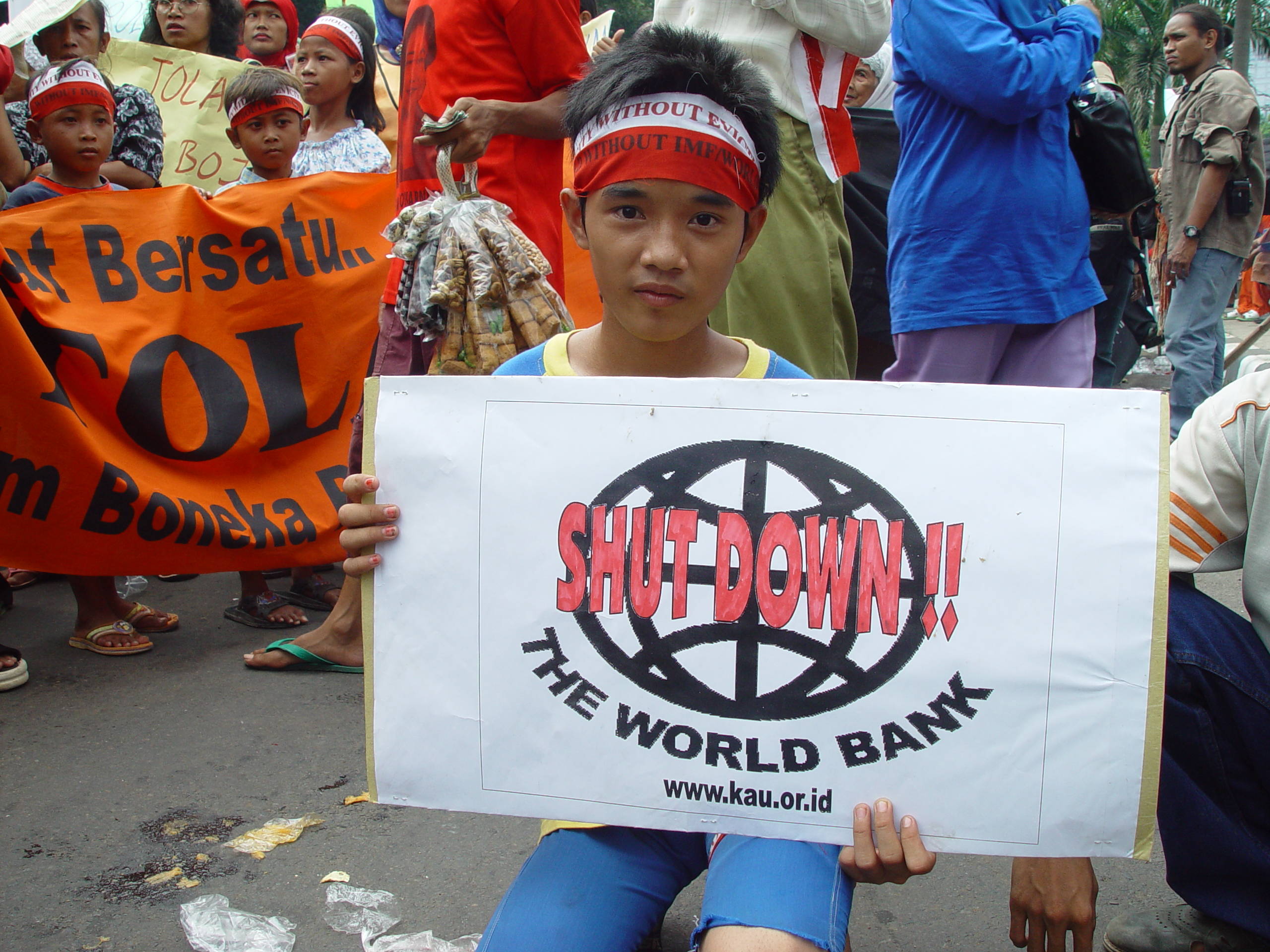
A young World Bank protester in Jakarta, Indonesia

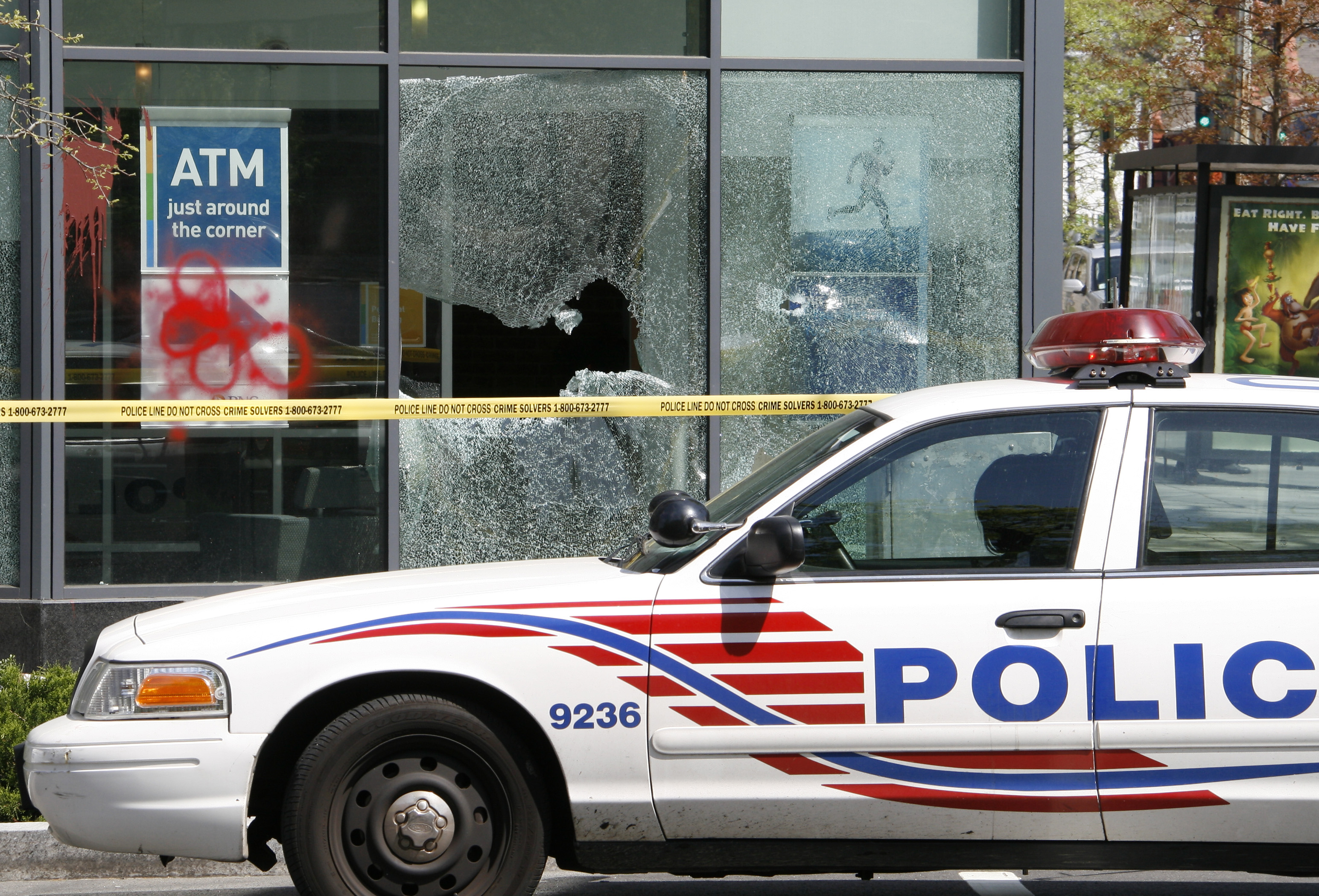
World Bank/IMF protesters smashed the windows of this PNC Bank branch located in the Logan Circle neighbourhood of Washington, D.C.

The World Bank has long been criticized by non-governmental organizations, such as the indigenous rights group Survival International, and academics, including Henry Hazlitt, Ludwig Von Mises, and Joseph Stiglitz, former Chief Economist for the World Bank. Stiglitz is equally critical of the International Monetary Fund, the US Treasury Department, and the US and other developed country trade negotiators. Hazlitt argued that the World Bank along with the monetary system it was designed within would promote world inflation and "a world in which international trade is State-dominated" when they were being advocated. Stiglitz argued that the free market reform policies that the bank advocates are often harmful to economic development if implemented badly, too quickly ("shock therapy"), in the wrong sequence or in weak, uncompetitive economies. Ludwig von Mises opposed institutions like the World Bank because he believed they replace market-based investment controlled by the collective decisions of voluntary participants with politically driven lending controlled by bureaucrats who are shielded from the consequences of their actions. He argued this practice distorts prices and interest rates leading to malinvestment, or inefficient use of capital (see economic calculation problem). He also warned such systems raise moral hazard by encouraging government dependency and poor economic decision-making.

World Bank loan agreements can also force procurements of goods and services at uncompetitive, non-free-market, prices. Other critical writers, such as John Perkins, label the international financial institutions as 'illegal and illegitimate and a cog of coercive American diplomacy in carrying out financial terrorism.

Defenders of the World Bank contend that no country is forced to borrow its money. The bank provides both loans and grants. Even the loans are concessional since they are given to countries that have no access to international capital markets. Furthermore, the loans, both to poor and middle-income countries, are below market-value interest rates. The World Bank argues that it can help development more through loans than grants because money repaid on the loans can then be lent for other projects.

The IFC and MIGA and their way of evaluating the social and environmental impact of their projects has also been criticized. Critics state that even though IFC and MIGA have more of these standards than the World Bank, they mostly rely on private-sector clients to monitor their implementation and miss an independent monitoring institution in this context. This is why an extensive review of the institutions' implementation strategy of social and environmental standards is demanded.

One of the most common criticisms of the World Bank has been the way it is governed. While the World Bank represents 188 countries, it is run by a small number of economically powerful countries. These countries (which also provide most of the institution's funding) choose the bank's leadership and senior management, and critics argue the interests of these economically powerful nations dominate the World Bank agenda. Titus Alexander argues that the unequal voting power of western countries and the World Bank's role in developing countries makes it similar to the South African Development Bank under apartheid, and therefore a pillar of global apartheid.

In the 1990s, the World Bank and the IMF forged the Washington Consensus, policies that included deregulation and liberalization of markets, privatization and the downscaling of government. Though the Washington Consensus was conceived as a policy that would best promote development, it was criticized for ignoring equity, employment, and how reforms like privatization were carried out. Stiglitz argued that the Washington Consensus placed too much emphasis on GDP growth and not enough on the permanence of growth or on whether growth contributed to better living standards.

The United States Senate Committee on Foreign Relations report criticized the World Bank and other international financial institutions for focusing too much "on issuing loans rather than on achieving concrete development results within a finite period of time" and called on the institution to "strengthen anti-corruption efforts".

James Ferguson has argued that the main effect of many development projects carried out by the World Bank and similar organizations is not the alleviation of poverty. Instead, the projects often serve to expand the exercise of bureaucratic state power. His case studies of development projects in Thaba-Tseka show that the World Bank's characterization of the economic conditions in Lesotho was flawed, and the bank ignored the political and cultural character of the state in crafting its projects. As a result, the projects failed to help the poor but succeeded in expanding the government bureaucracy.

Criticism of the World Bank and other organizations often takes the form of protesting, such as the World Bank Oslo 2002 Protests, the 2007 October Rebellion, and the 1999 Battle of Seattle. Such demonstrations have occurred all over the world, even among the Brazilian Kayapo people.

Another source of criticism has been the tradition of having an American head the bank, implemented because the United States provides the majority of World Bank funding. "When economists from the World Bank visit poor countries to dispense cash and advice," observed The Economist in 2012, "they routinely tell governments to reject cronyism and fill each important job with the best candidate available. It is good advice. The World Bank should take it."

In 2021, an independent inquiry of the World Bank's Doing Business reports by the law firm WilmerHale found that World Bank leaders, including then-Chief Executive Kristalina Georgieva and then-President Jim Yong Kim, pressured staff members of the bank to alter data to inflate the rankings for China, Saudi Arabia, Azerbaijan and the United Arab Emirates.

In September 2023, it was revealed that the World Bank had poured billions of dollars into fossil fuel projects in 2022. Campaigners estimated that about $3.7bn in trade finance was supplied to oil and gas projects despite the World Bank's green pledges.

=== Allegations of corruption ===
The World Bank's Integrity Vice Presidency (INT) is charged with the investigation of internal fraud and corruption, including complaint intake, investigation, and investigation reports.

=== Structural adjustment ===
The effect of structural adjustment policies on poor countries has been one of the most significant criticisms of the World Bank. The 1979 energy crisis plunged many countries into economic crisis. The World Bank responded with structural adjustment loans, which distributed aid to struggling countries while enforcing policy changes in order to reduce inflation and fiscal imbalance. Some of these policies included encouraging production, investment and labour-intensive manufacturing, changing real exchange rates, and altering the distribution of government resources. Structural adjustment policies were most effective in countries with an institutional framework that allowed these policies to be implemented easily. For some countries, particularly in Sub-Saharan Africa, economic growth regressed and inflation worsened.

By the late 1980s, some international organizations began to believe that structural adjustment policies were worsening life for the world's poor, due to a reduction in social spending and an increase in the price of food, as subsidies were lifted. It also have been criticized for being Debt-trap diplomacy. The World Bank changed structural adjustment loans, allowing for social spending to be maintained, and encouraging a slower change to policies such as transfer of subsidies and price rises. In 1999, the World Bank and the IMF introduced the Poverty Reduction Strategy Paper approach to replace structural adjustment loans.

=== Fairness of assistance conditions ===
Some critics, most prominently the author Naomi Klein, are of the opinion that the World Bank Group's loans and aid have unfair conditions attached to them which reflect the interests, financial power and political doctrines (notably the Washington Consensus) of the bank and the countries that are most influential within it. Among other allegations, Klein says the Group's credibility was damaged "when it forced school fees on students in Ghana in exchange for a loan; when it demanded that Tanzania privatise its water system; when it made telecom privatisation a condition of aid for Hurricane Mitch; when it demanded labour 'flexibility' in Sri Lanka in the aftermath of the Asian tsunami; when it pushed for eliminating food subsidies in post-invasion Iraq".

A study of the period 1970–2004 found that a less-developed country would on average receive more World Bank projects during any period when it occupied one of the rotating seats on the UN Security Council.

=== Sovereign immunity ===
The World Bank requires sovereign immunity from countries it deals with. Sovereign immunity waives a holder from all legal liability for their actions. It is proposed that this immunity from responsibility is a "shield which The World Bank wants to resort to, for escaping accountability and security by the people". As the United States has veto power, it can prevent the World Bank from taking action against its interests.

=== Cronyism and Elite Capture ===
Criticism was also leveled under the presidency of Jim Yong Kim, particularly regarding financial management and staff morale. Reports of a controversial $94,000 bonus awarded to the Bank's CFO, Bertrand Badré (2013–2016), at his request on top of a tax-free salary of $379,000, while significant staff cuts and austerity measures were being implemented, drew criticism from within and outside the organization. This bonus, revealed by Senior Country Officer Fabrice Houdart amidst a broader effort by Kim to implement cost-cutting reforms, sparked debates over transparency, ethics, and the organization's commitment to its own principles, further exacerbating concerns about trust and leadership within the World Bank. Badré renounced the bonus and left the Bank shortly after.

The World Bank was the subject of a scandal with its then-president Paul Wolfowitz and his aide, Shaha Riza, in 2007.

According to reports citing a recording of a 2018 staff meeting shared by a whistleblower, World Bank staff were informed Robert Malpass, a recent economics graduate of Cornell University and the son of David Malpass, then US Under Secretary of the Treasury for International Affairs and later President of the World Bank Group, would be hired as an analyst in July of that year. On the recording, staff were reportedly told Robert Malpass was a "prince" and an "important little fellow" who could go "running to daddy." Bank officials also believed David Malpass was more influential than then-US Treasury Secretary Steven Mnuchin, who they said "has little or no clue on things." In April 2018, the US Treasury had changed its position to back a $13 billion capital infusion for the bank.

Malpass served as undersecretary of the US Treasury in the Trump administration before being appointed by Trump in February 2019 to be World Bank's president. Before Malpass became president, his son Robert had joined the International Finance Corporation (IFC), a branch of the World Bank Group that lends money to private sector businesses and whose USD 5.5 billion funding from a USD 13 billion World Bank capital increase was secured by the US Treasury at the time that David Malpass was the Treasury's undersecretary.

=== Criticism of specific loans and programs in Africa ===
Almost 45% of all the World Bank's resources are going to Africa, despite this the region continues to face significant financing gaps and development challenges.

On 9 August 2023, the World Bank announced it was suspending new loans to Uganda because it claims that a new anti-homosexuality act, enacted in May 2023, contradicts its core values on human rights. The World Bank joined the United States in imposing sanctions against Uganda over the anti-homosexuality law. Uganda dismissed the move by the World Bank as unjust and hypocritical.

The World Bank funded a program in Tanzania supposed to help nature conservation. The program was criticized because it led to severe violation of human rights toward the Maasai people.

=== Investments ===
The World Bank Group has also been criticized for investing in projects with human rights issues.

The Compliance Advisor/Ombudsman (CAO) criticized a loan the bank made to the palm oil company Dinant after the 2009 Honduran coup d'état. There have been numerous killings of Campesinos in the region where Dinant was operating.

Other controversial investments include loans to the Chixoy Hydroelectric Dam in Guatemala while it was under military dictatorship, and to Goldcorp (then Glamis Gold) for the construction of the Marlin Mine.

In 2019, the Congressional-Executive Commission on China questioned the World Bank about a loan in Xinjiang, China, that was used to buy high-end security gear, including surveillance equipment. The bank launched an internal investigation in response to the allegation. In August 2020, U.S. lawmakers questioned the continued disbursement of the loan.

== See also ==
- Annual Meetings of the International Monetary Fund and the World Bank Group
- Architecture of Washington, D.C.
- Clean Energy for Development Investment Framework
- Energy Sector Management Assistance Program (ESMAP)
- New Development Bank
